= Raipura, Panna =

Raipura
- Town
- Raipura
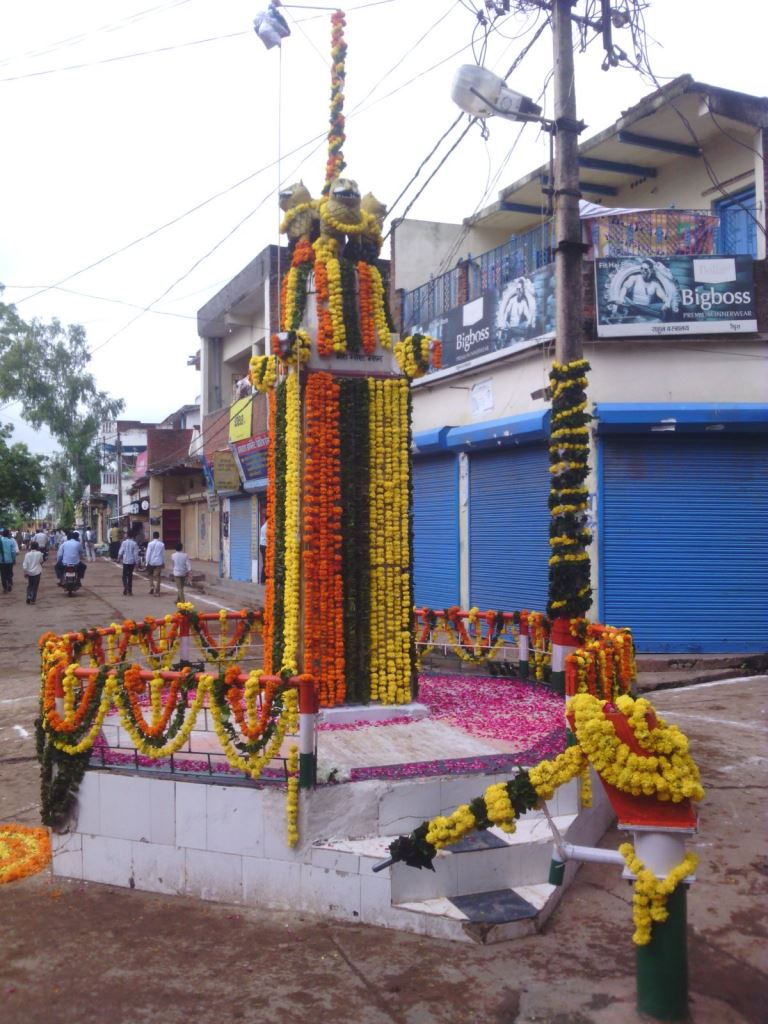
- Jhanda Chowk Raipura

- Location in Madhya Pradesh, india
- Coordinates: 23.895367°N 79.957734°E
- Country: India
- State: Madhya Pradesh
- Division: Sagar
- District: Panna

Government
  - Type: Gram Panchayat
  - Body: Gram Panchayat Raipura

Area
  - Total: 17.2048 km^{2} (6.6428 sq mi)

Population (2011)
  - Total: 7,500
  - Density: 440/km^{2} (1,100/sq mi)
- Time zone: UTC+5:30
- PIN: 488442
- 07334: 488442
- Vehicle registration: MP35
- Official language: Hindi

Raipura is a town which comes under the jurisdiction of Panna district, Madhya Pradesh, India. It is one of the nine tehsils of Panna. It is about 113 km from the district headquarters. It is surrounded by Damoh and Katni districts.

The nearest district headquarters of Katni is 50 km away from Raipura. It shares borders with Rithi tehsil to the east, Bahoriband tehsil to the south, Patera tehsil to the north-west, and Pawai tehsil to the north-east.

== Geography ==
Raipura village is located in 'Raipura Tehsil' of 'Panna' district in 'Madhya Pradesh', India. It is situated 113 km away from the district headquarters of Panna.

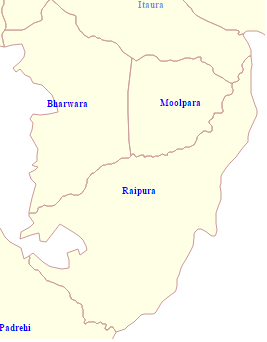
Raipura Map With Surrounding Villages

As per 2009 stats, Raipura village is also a Gram Panchayat. According to Census 2011 information the location code of Raipura village is 459544. The total geographical area of village is 1,720.48 hectares.

== Demographics ==
=== Total population ===
Raipura has a total population of 5,426 which includes:

Males: 2,817

Females: 2,609

Population in the age-group 0-6:

Total: 842;

Male: 450;

Female: 392

=== Number of total houses ===
There are about 1,280 houses in Raipura village.

2011 Census Data on Raipura:

Population	Persons	Males	Females
Total	5,426	2,817	2,609
In the age group 0–6 years	842	450	392
Scheduled Castes (SC)	1,703	888	815
Scheduled Tribes (ST)	81	42	39
Literates	3,404	1,988	1,416
Illiterate	2,022	829	1,193
Total Worker	2,098	1,503	595
Main Worker	1,329	1,133	196
Main Worker - Cultivator	554	514	40
Main Worker - Agricultural Labourers	41	27	14
Main Worker - Household Industries	137	98	39
Main Worker - Other	597	494	103
Marginal Worker	769	370	399
Marginal Worker - Cultivator	181	77	104
Marginal Worker - Agriculture Labourers	332	156	176
Marginal Worker - Household Industries	55	21	34
Marginal Workers - Other	201	116	85
Marginal Worker (3-6 Months)	614	304	310
Marginal Worker - Cultivator (3-6 Months)	130	61	69
Marginal Worker - Agriculture Labourers (3-6 Months)	300	137	163
Marginal Worker - Household Industries (3-6 Months)	46	20	26
Marginal Worker - Other (3-6 Months)	138	86	52
Marginal Worker (0-3 Months)	155	66	89
Marginal Worker - Cultivator (0-3 Months)	51	16	35
Marginal Worker - Agriculture Labourers (0-3 Months)	32	19	13
Marginal Worker - Household Industries (0-3 Months)	9	1	8
Marginal Worker - Other Workers (0-3 Months)	63	30	33
Non Worker	3,328	1,314	2,014

== Literacy ==
Raipura has almost 3,404 literates including 1,988 Males and 1,416 Females.

There are 2,022 illiterates including 829 Males and 1,193 females.

== Transportation ==
Available means of Public transportation includes Bus and Train (via Salaiya Railway). Some Auto rickshaws can also be expected in some of the areas.

State Highways SH14 and SH51 pass through the town, where the buses for Katni, Jabalpur, Damoh, Sagar, Indore, Panna, and Tikamgarh are available.

== Civic administration ==
=== Tahshil ===
There are 109 villages under the jurisdiction of Raipura Tahsil.

Total Number of Households: 20,062

Percentage distribution of Households

Permanent: 2,933 (14.61%)

Semi-permanent: 13,404 (66.76%)

Temporary: 3,725 (18.55%)

=== Gram Panchayat ===
The Gram Panchayat Raipura is charged with governance of the town's civic and infrastructural assets. Mamta Jain is Sarpanch of current panchvarsi, Since 2022.

== Major places ==
1. Jhanda Chowk: Situated in the Heart of Raipura, Jhanda Chowk is one of the popular and old places in Raipura. It is a center of all public meetings, public events and festival celebration.

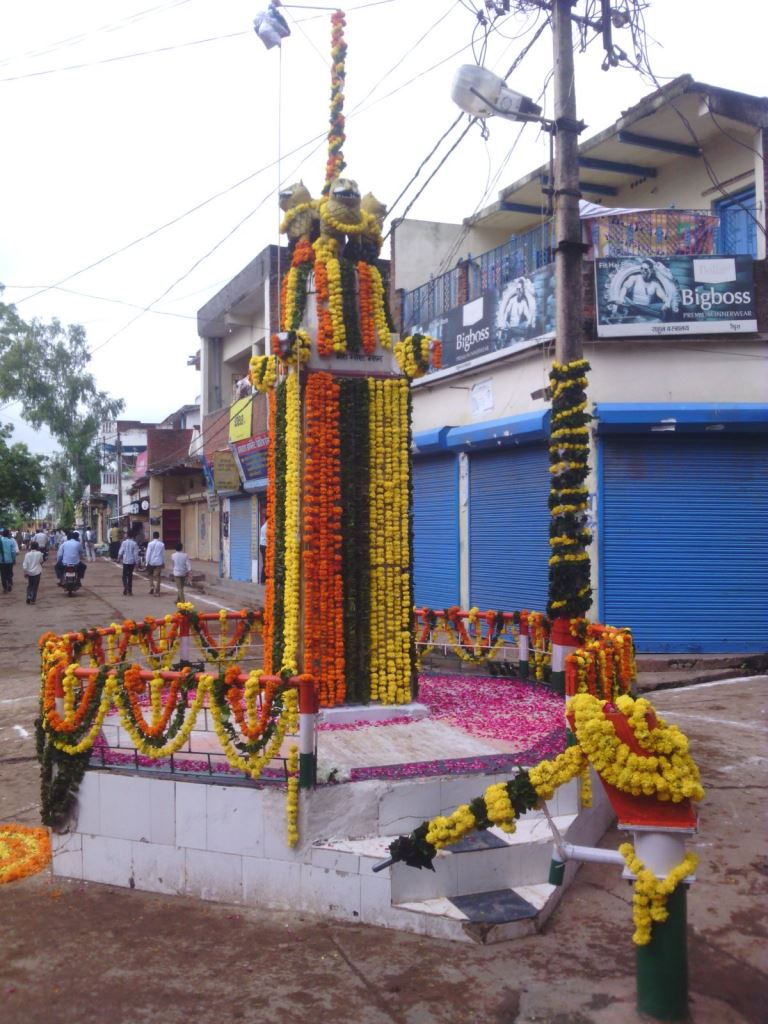
Jhanda Chowk

2. Sankat Mochan Dham: "Sankat Mochan = Hanuman" and "Dham = Place". Literal Meaning 'Place of Lord Hanuman'

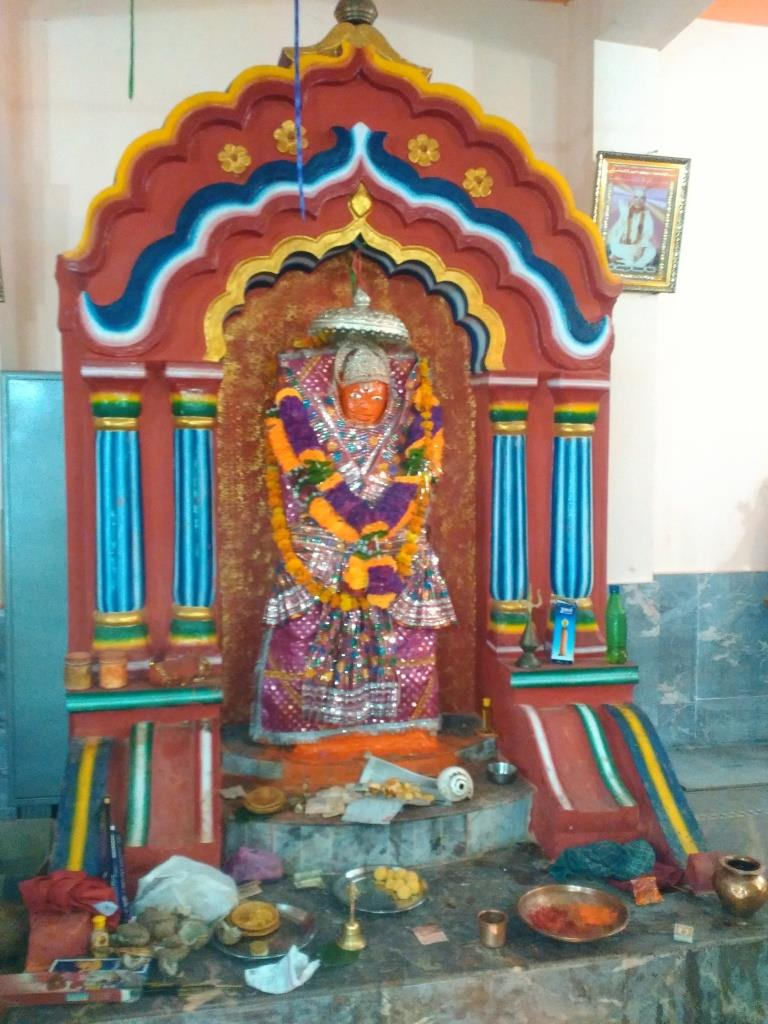
Sankat Mochan Dham

3. Trigadda (Three Ways Center):

4. Foota: It is also referred to as Sanjay Nagar.

== Education ==
=== Schools ===
The town hosts schools including:-

- Govt. Higher Secondary School, Raipura
- Saraswati Gyan Mandir
- Seth Sukhai Lal Shishu Vidya Mandir
- Saraswati Shishu Mandir (Shri Ram Shiksha Dwara Sanchalit)
- Jodhan Singh School (English Medium)

=== College ===
A private college named Rajiv Gandhi College is situated in the town.

== Economy ==
The economy is mainly based on agriculture.
