= Amanganj =

- Town
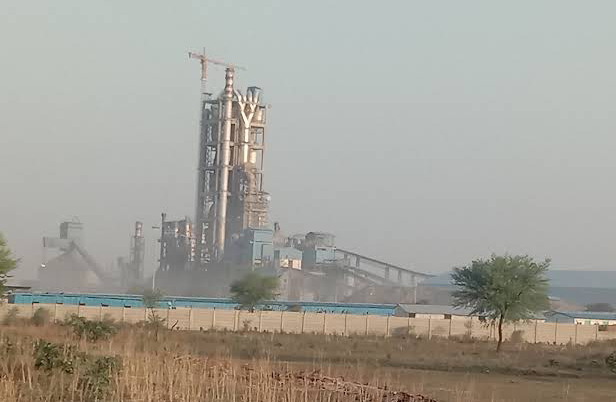
- JK Cement, Panna

- Location in Madhya Pradesh, India Amanganj (India)
- Coordinates: 24.43°N 80.03°E
- Country: India
- State: Madhya Pradesh
- District: Panna
- Region: Bundelkhand
- Elevation: 329 m (1,079 ft)

Population (2011)
  - Total: 13,886

Languages
  - Official: Hindi
- Time zone: UTC+5:30 (IST)
- Pincode: 488441
- ISO 3166 code: IN-MP
- Vehicle registration: MP 35

Amanganj is a town and a Nagar Panchayat and a tehsil in Panna district in the state of Madhya Pradesh, India.

== Geography ==
Amanganj is located on 24.43°N 80.03°E. Amanganj has an average elevation of 329 metres (1,079 feet). Ken River and Sunar River Flows near Amanganj Town.

== Demographics ==
As of the 2011 Census of India, The Amanganj town is divided into 16 wards for which elections are held every five years. The Amanganj Nagar Panchayat has population of 13,886 of which 7,293 are males while 6,593 are females.

Population of children with age of 0-6 is 1,969 which is 14.18% of total population of Amanganj (NP). In Amanganj Nagar Panchayat, female sex ratio is of 904 against state average of 931. Child sex ratio in Amanganj is around 989 compared to the Madhya Pradesh state average of 918. Literacy rate of Amanganj is 77.56% higher than state average of 69.32%. In Amanganj, male literacy is around 83.64% while female literacy rate is 70.73%.

== Economy and Culture ==
Here is many lime-stone mine operated in Amanganj region. Jk cement stabilise a cement plant near Amanganj. Ken River is passing from here so irrigation system is well operated here. agriculture is primarily source for income in rural area.

There is a temple of Jawalmukhi Devi situated in Amanganj, which is the main centre of devotion, apart from this Shri Hanuman temple is also situated here, this temple is the main centre of faith among the local people, many festivals and fairs are organised here.

== Transportation ==
Amanganj is located on Panna-Damoh-Katni highway's tri-junction. Amanganj is connected by private bus services to all nearest major cities.
