= Simariya, Panna =

Village in Madhya Pradesh, India

Garhi Simariya
- Town
- Location in Madhya Pradesh, India
- Coordinates: 24.53°N 80.24°E
- Country: India
- State: Madhya Pradesh
- District: Panna

Simariya, Simaria Dauwa or Simariya Garhi is a village in Panna district of Madhya Pradesh in India. It belongs to Sagar division. It is also a tehsil.

In 2011 the village had a population of 5,076, of which 2,680 were males while 2,396 were females.

Simariya is Located on Damoh, Hatta, Panna Road, its connected major cities by Bus Service. 488442 is Pin Code of Simariya.
