= Birwahi =

Village in Madhya Pradesh, India

Coordinates: 24°36′57″N 80°22′45″E

Birwahi is a village and gram panchayat in Devendranagar tehsil, Panna District, Madhya Pradesh, India.
