= Shahnagar =

Town in Panna, Madhya Pradesh, India

- Town
- Location in Madhya Pradesh, India
- Coordinates: 23.99°N 80.30°E
- Country: India
- State: Madhya Pradesh
- Division: Sagar
- District: Panna

Shahnagar (Village ID 459377) is a town in Panna District of Sagar Division in Madhya Pradesh in India. its also a tehsil and a sub division in the District.

== Geography ==
Shahnagar is located at 23.99°N 80.30°E. It has an average elevation of 406 metres (1332 ft). Shahnagar is located on the banks of Ken River.

== Climate ==
Shahnagar has humid subtropical climate (Köppen climate classification Cwa) with hot summers, a somewhat cooler monsoon season and cool winters. Heavy rainfall occurs in the monsoon season from June to September.

== Demographics ==
Shahnagar town has population of 5,104 of which 2,656 are males while 2,448 are females as Census 2011 with a total 1169 families residing.

== Transportation ==
Shahnagar is well connected with the road network. Roads are connected from district headquarters, Panna. It connects Katni, Pawai, Satna and many cities with roads.

== See also ==
- Ken River
- Pawai Assembly constituency
