= Pandav Falls =

Waterfall in Madhya Pradesh, India

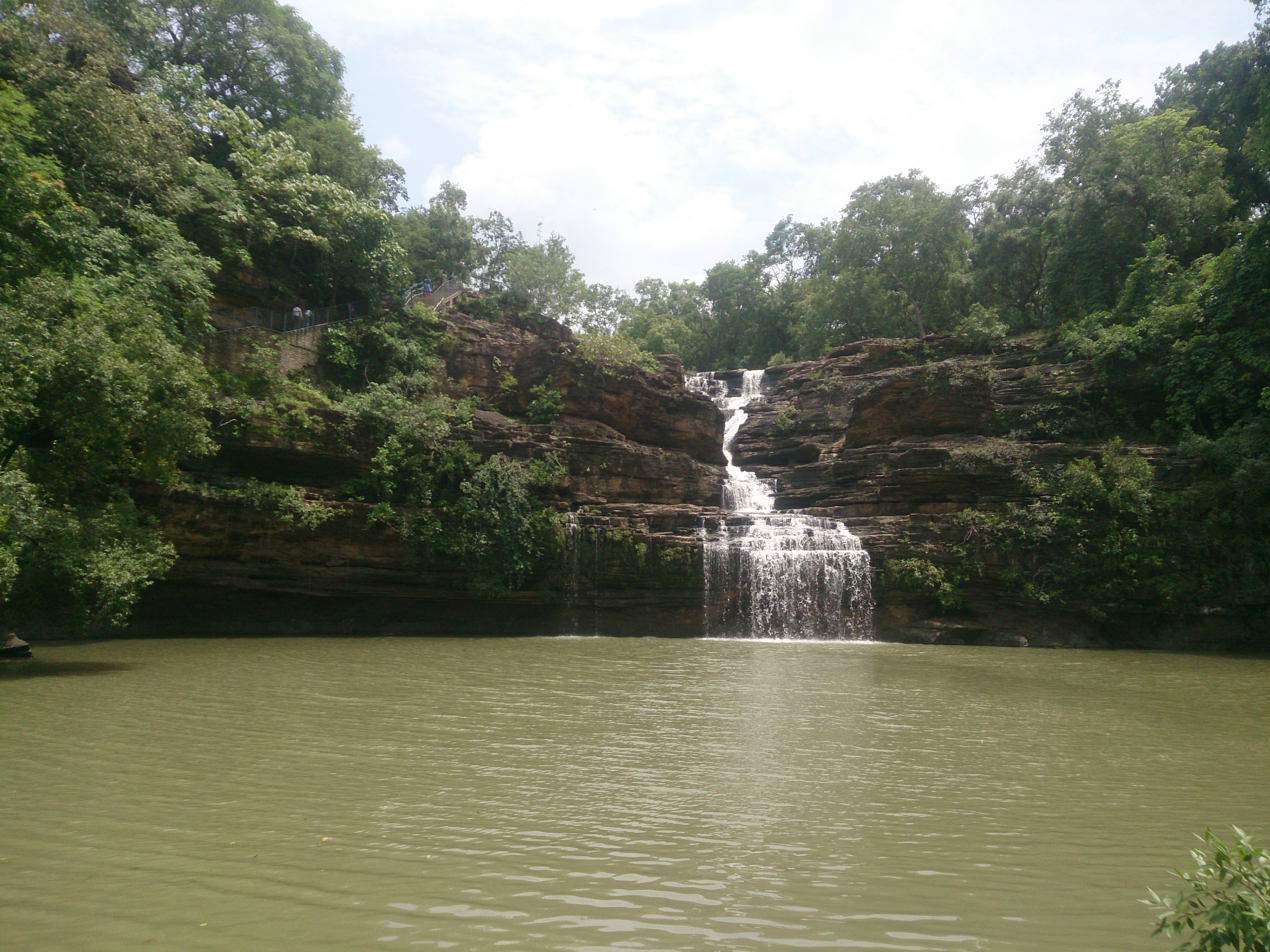
- Natural running water falls at Panna District, Madhya Pradesh.
- Interactive map of Pandav Falls
- Location: Panna district, Madhya Pradesh, India
- Coordinates: 24.731°N 80.067°E
- Total height: 30 metres (98 ft)

The Pandav Falls is a waterfall in the Panna district in the Indian state of Madhya Pradesh.

About 30 metres (98 ft) high, it is located on a tributary of the Ken River, as it plunges over the falls to join it. Pandav Falls is located 12 kilometres (7.5 mi) from Panna and 35 kilometres (22 mi) from Khajuraho, close to Raneh Falls.

The falls are named after the legendary Pandava brothers of the epic poem Mahabharata, who supposedly visited this area. Remains of caves and shrines that commemorate this legend can be seen around the pool below.

== See also ==
- List of waterfalls
- List of waterfalls in India
