= Brihaspati Kund =

Crater in India

Coordinates: 24.844°N 80.486°E

Brihaspati Kund (Hindi: बृहस्पति कुण्ड) is a natural crater located in Panna District of the Bundelkhand region of Madhya Pradesh, India. It is located 38 km from Panna and 33 km southwards of Kalinjar Fort. The crater is a popular tourist spot among locals.
