= Jaruapur =

Village in Madhya Pradesh, India

Coordinates: 24.7049°N 80.1274°E

Jaruapur is a village in Panna district of Madhya Pradesh state of India.
