= Gatha Falls =

Coordinates: 24.713980°N 80.094999°E

- Interactive map of Gatha Falls
- Location: Panna district, Madhya Pradesh, India
- Total height: 91 metres (299 ft)
- Watercourse: Not known

The Gatha Falls (or Gatha Seha) is a waterfall in Panna district in the Indian state of Madhya Pradesh. It is the 36th highest waterfall in India.

== The falls ==
The Gatha Falls has a height of 91 metres (299 ft).

== Location ==
The Gatha Falls is located near Panna, off the NH 39.

== See also ==
- List of waterfalls in India
- List of waterfalls in India by height
