= Devendranagar =

- Town
- Location in Madhya Pradesh, India Devendranagar (India)
- Coordinates: 24°36′57″N 80°22′45″E
- Country: India
- State: Madhya Pradesh
- District: Panna
- Elevation: 352 m (1,155 ft)

Population (2011)
  - Total: 12,785

Languages
  - Official: Hindi
- Time zone: UTC+5:30 (IST)
- Vehicle registration: MP-35

Devendranagar is a town and a nagar panchayat in Panna district in the state of Madhya Pradesh, India. Earlier before the merger it was part of the former Princely State of Ajaigarh.

== Demographics ==
As of the 2011 Census of India, Devendra nagar had a population of 12,785. Males constitute 53% of the population and females 47%. Devendra nagar has an average literacy rate of 61%, higher than the national average of 59.5%: male literacy is 69% and, female literacy is 52%. In Devendra nagar, 18% of the population is under 6 years of age.
