= Panna Airport =

Airport in Panna, Madhya Pradesh, India

Coordinates: 24.7180°N 80.1818°E

- IATA: none; ICAO: none

Summary
- Airport type: Public
- Operator: Airports Authority of India
- Serves: Panna
- Location: Panna, India
- Elevation AMSL: 1,394 ft / 425 m
- Interactive map of Panna Airport

Runways
Direction	Length		Surface
Direction	ft	m	Surface
17/35	5,000	1,524	Unpaved

Panna Airport is an airport that serves the town of Panna, Madhya Pradesh, India. Spread over 106 acres, it is maintained by the Airports Authority of India.

The airport is listed as "non-operational", part of a list of 32 such airports submitted by the then Civil Aviation Minister Praful Patel to the Lok Sabha in 2009, though the Chief Minister of Madhya Pradesh, Shivraj Singh Chouhan had spoken of privatising the airport in 2007.
