= Panna district =

- District of Madhya Pradesh
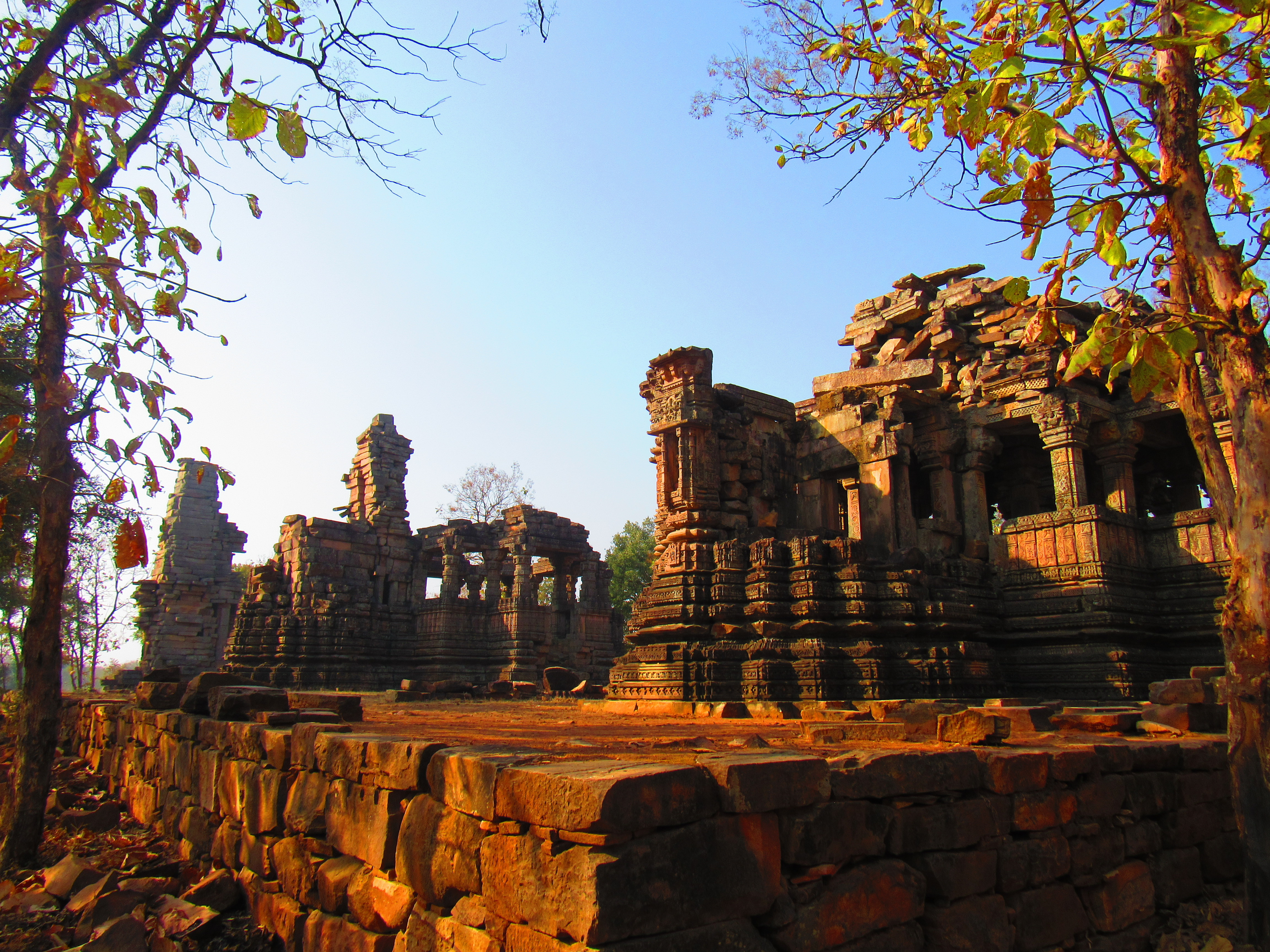
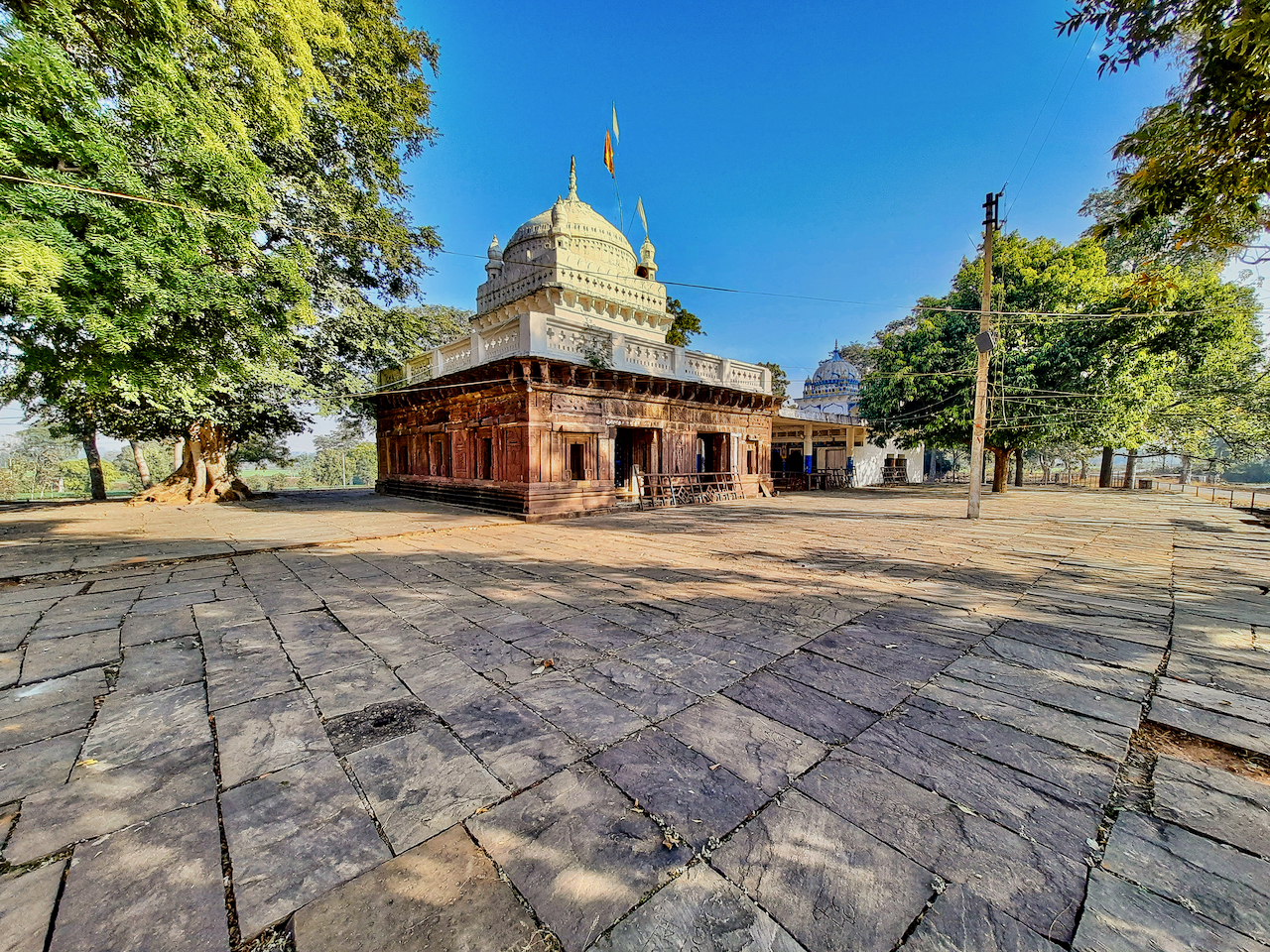
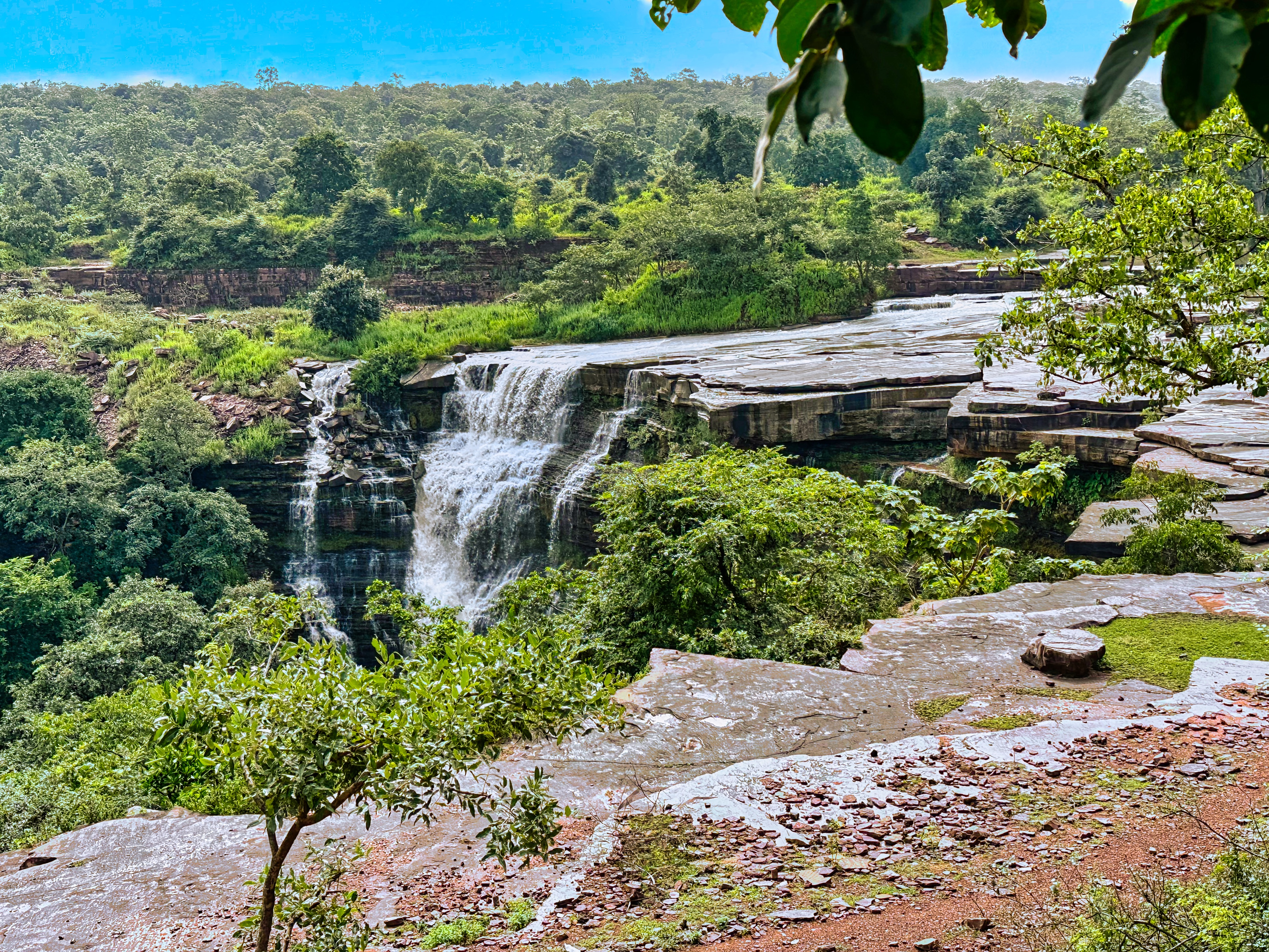
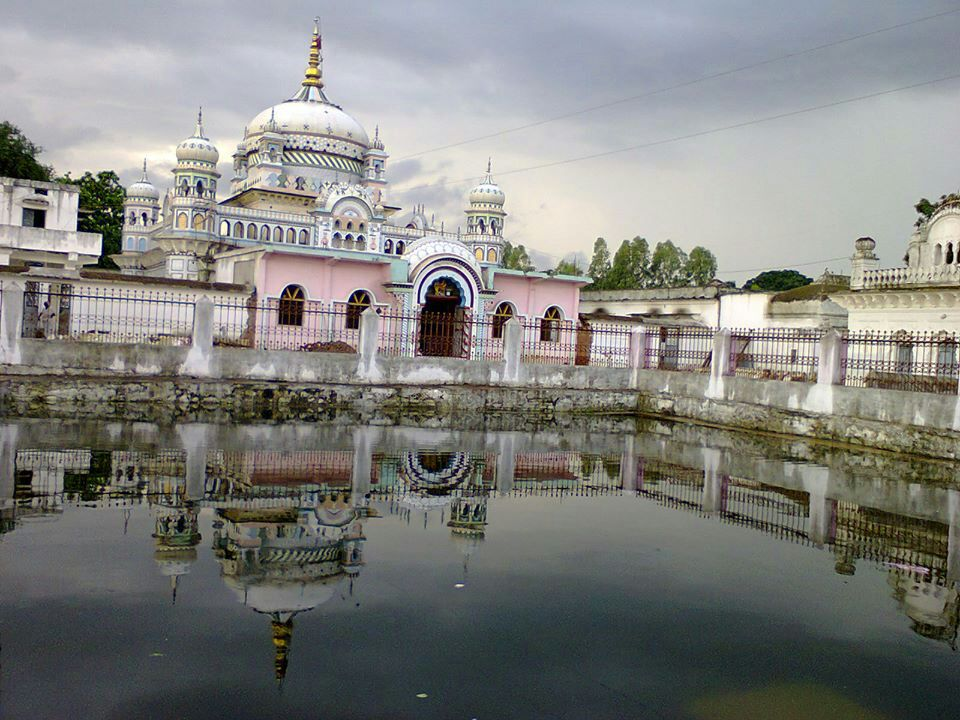
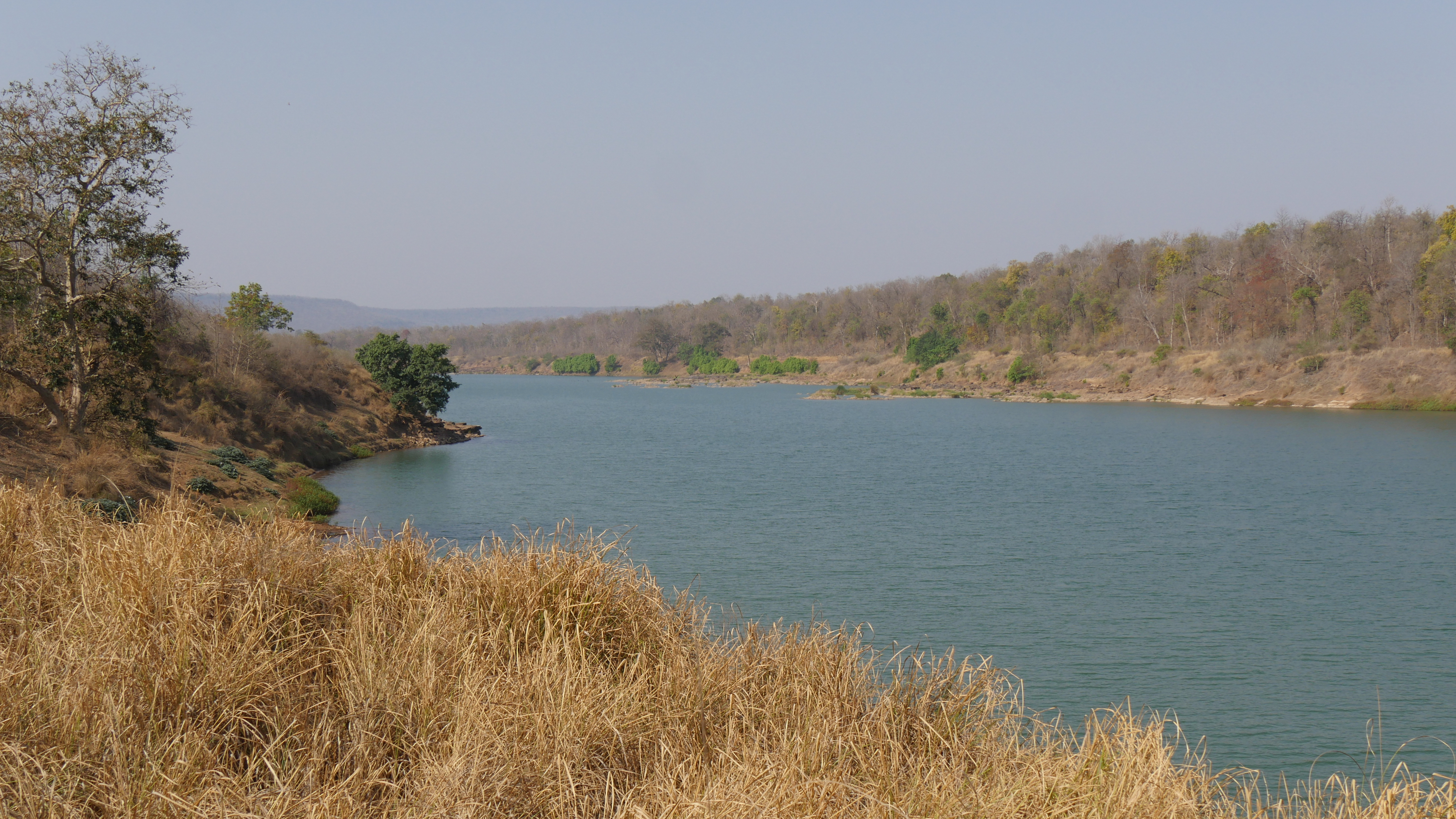
- Clockwise from top-left: Ajaygarh Temple, Mritangeshwara Temple in Nandchand, Parnami Temple, Ken River in Panna National Park, Pawai Chandi Waterfalls

- Location of Panna district in Madhya Pradesh
- Country: India
- State: Madhya Pradesh
- Division: Sagar
- Headquarters: Panna
- Tehsils: 1. Panna, 2. Ajaygarh; 3. Pawai; 4. Amanganj; 5. Gunour; 6. Shahnagar; 7. Raipura; 8. Devendranagar; 9. Simariya

Government
  - Body: Legislative Assembly of Panna, Pawai and Gunour
  - Collector & District Magistrate: Shri Suresh Kumar(IAS)
  - Lok Sabha constituencies: Khajuraho
  - member of parliament: V.D.Sharma(BJP)

Area
  - Total: 7,135 km^{2} (2,755 sq mi)

Population (2011)
  - Total: 1,016,520
  - Density: 142.5/km^{2} (369.0/sq mi)

Demographics
  - Literacy: 66.08%
  - Sex ratio: 907
- Time zone: UTC+05:30 (IST)
- Vehicle registration: MP-35
- Major highways: NH 39 State highway 49
- Website: panna.nic.in

Panna district (Hindi pronunciation: [pənːaː]) is a district of the Sagar Division, within the Madhya Pradesh state in central India. The town of Panna is the district headquarters.

== History ==
Panna district was created in 1950, shortly after Indian independence, from the territory of several former princely states of British India, including the states of Panna, Jaso, most of Ajaigarh, and a portion of Paldeo. Panna District was part of the new Indian state of Vindhya Pradesh, which was merged into Madhya Pradesh on 1 November 1956.

== Geography ==
Panna district lies between 23.45°N 79.45°E and 25.10°N 80.40°E. It has an area of 7,135 km^{2}.

The Ken River flows through the district. The Pandav Falls, The Brihaspati Kund, and the Gatha Falls are in the district. Panna National Park is a major tourist attraction in the district.

Panna, Ajaygarh, Amanganj and Pawai are major towns of the district.

== Economy ==
In 2006 the Ministry of Panchayati Raj named Panna one of the country's 250 most backward districts (out of a total of 640). It is one of the 24 districts in Madhya Pradesh currently receiving funds from the Backward Regions Grant Fund Programme (BRGF). It is among the five poorest districts in the state in terms of income. It ranks 41st out of 45 districts in human development index (HDI) in Madhya Pradesh.

This district has large reserves of diamonds and limestone, some cement factories are operated here. A unit of J.K. Cement is operating here. Udyogiri Puraina is an industrial area in Panna. It is located near Katni, some industrial units are functioning here.

== Divisions ==
=== Gram panchayats under Panna district ===
This intermediate subdivisions are also called block, intermediate panchayat, tehsil or tahsil. Inside Panna district, there are the following nine subdivisions:

- Ajaigarh
- Amanganj
- Gunour (or Gunnor, or Gunor as panchayat and habitation name or Gunaur as village name)
- Panna
- Pawai
- Shahnagar
- Raipura
- Simariya
- Devendranagar

== Demographics ==
Historical population
Year	Pop.	±% p.a.
1901	165,440	—
1911	207,021	+2.27%
1921	202,725	−0.21%
1931	215,137	+0.60%
1941	249,226	+1.48%
1951	259,659	+0.41%
1961	331,257	+2.47%
1971	429,077	+2.62%
1981	539,978	+2.33%
1991	687,945	+2.45%
2001	856,558	+2.22%
2011	1,016,520	+1.73%

Religions in Panna district (2011)
Religion	Percent
Hinduism	95.89%
Islam	3.46%
Jainism	0.47%
Other or not stated	0.18%

According to the 2011 census Panna District has a population of 1,016,520, roughly equal to the nation of Cyprus or the US state of Montana. This gives it a ranking of 442nd in India (out of a total of 640). The district has a population density of 142 inhabitants per square kilometre (370/sq mi) . Its population growth rate over the decade 2001–2011 was 18.62%. Panna has a sex ratio of 907 females for every 1000 males, and a literacy rate of 66.08%. 12.33% of the population lives in urban areas. Scheduled Castes and Tribes made up 20.46% and 16.81% of the population respectively.

=== Languages ===
Languages of Panna district (2011)
1. Hindi (69.1%)
2. Bundeli (29.7%)
3. Others (1.19%)

At the time of the 2011 Census of India, 69.08% of the population in the district spoke Hindi and 29.73% Bundeli as their first language.

Among Panna's languages is Bundeli, which has a lexical similarity of 72–91% with Hindi and is spoken by about 3 million people in Bagelkhand.

== Mining ==
Panna district is famous for its diamond mines located in a belt of about 80 km across the Panna town. In olden days the most productive mines were located in the village of Sukariuh. Nowadays, Majhagaon is the only active diamond mine in Asia.

== Tourist places ==
- Shreyansh Giri a major Jain pilgrimage center
- Ajaygarh Fort
- Panna National Park
- Raneh Falls
- Nachna Kuthara Mandir

== Villages ==
- Saleha
