= Nandchand =

Village in Madhya Pradesh, India

Coordinates: 23°59′52″N 80°04′01″E

- Country: India
- State: Madhya Pradesh
- District: Panna

Population (2011)
  - Total: 806

Nandchand or Nand Chand, is a village located in the Panna district of the Indian state of Madhya Pradesh. It is also an archaeological site, with archaeological remains of the Kalachuri kingdom.

== Archaeology ==
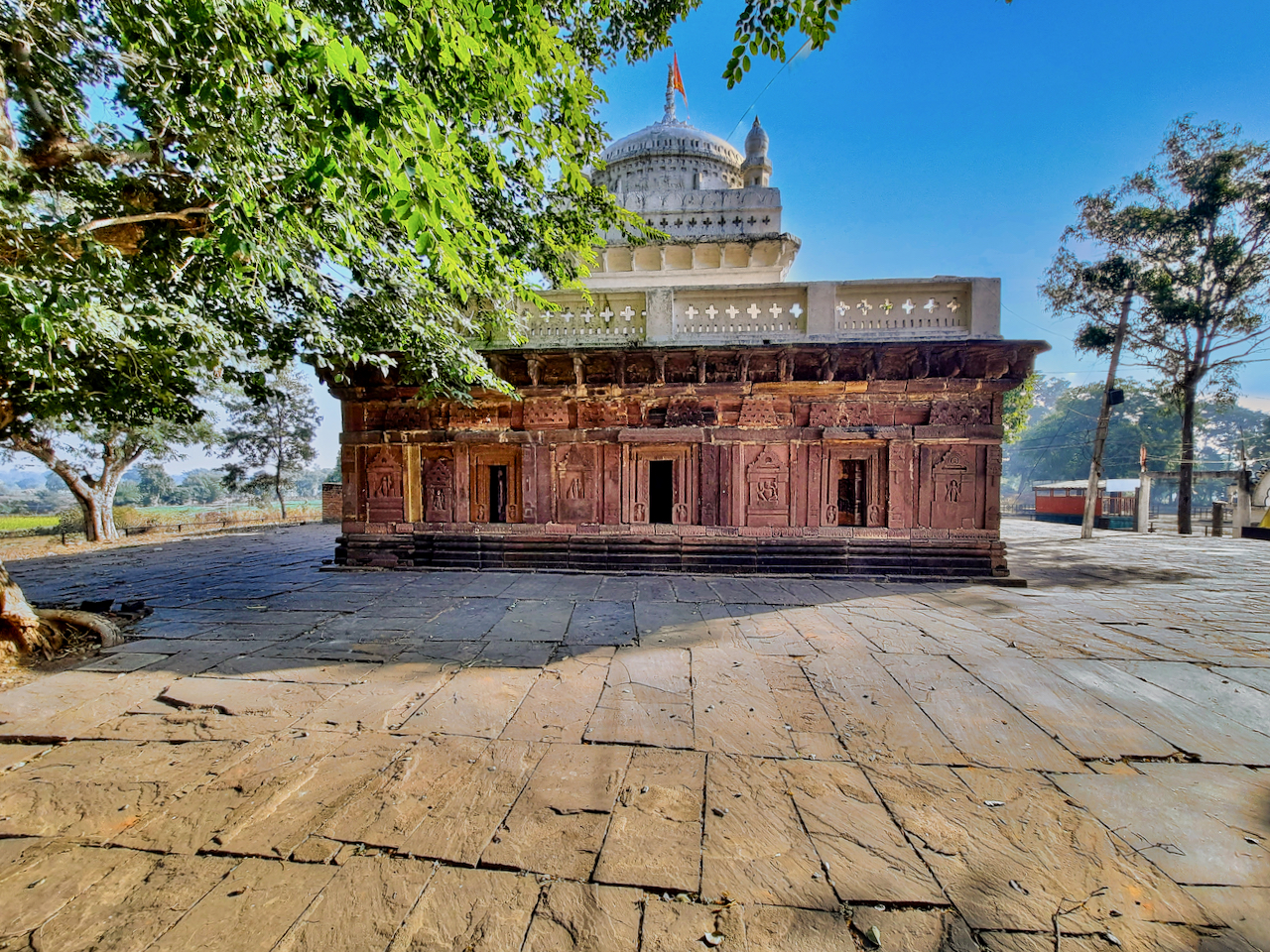
Mritangeshvara Shiva Temple

The Mritangeshwara temple is an important landmark. Several sculptures found around the temple and throughout the site are located in the Sagar University Museum.

== Demographics ==
According to the 2011 census, the village had a population of 806, in 208 households.
