= Ajaigarh =

Ajaygarh
- Town
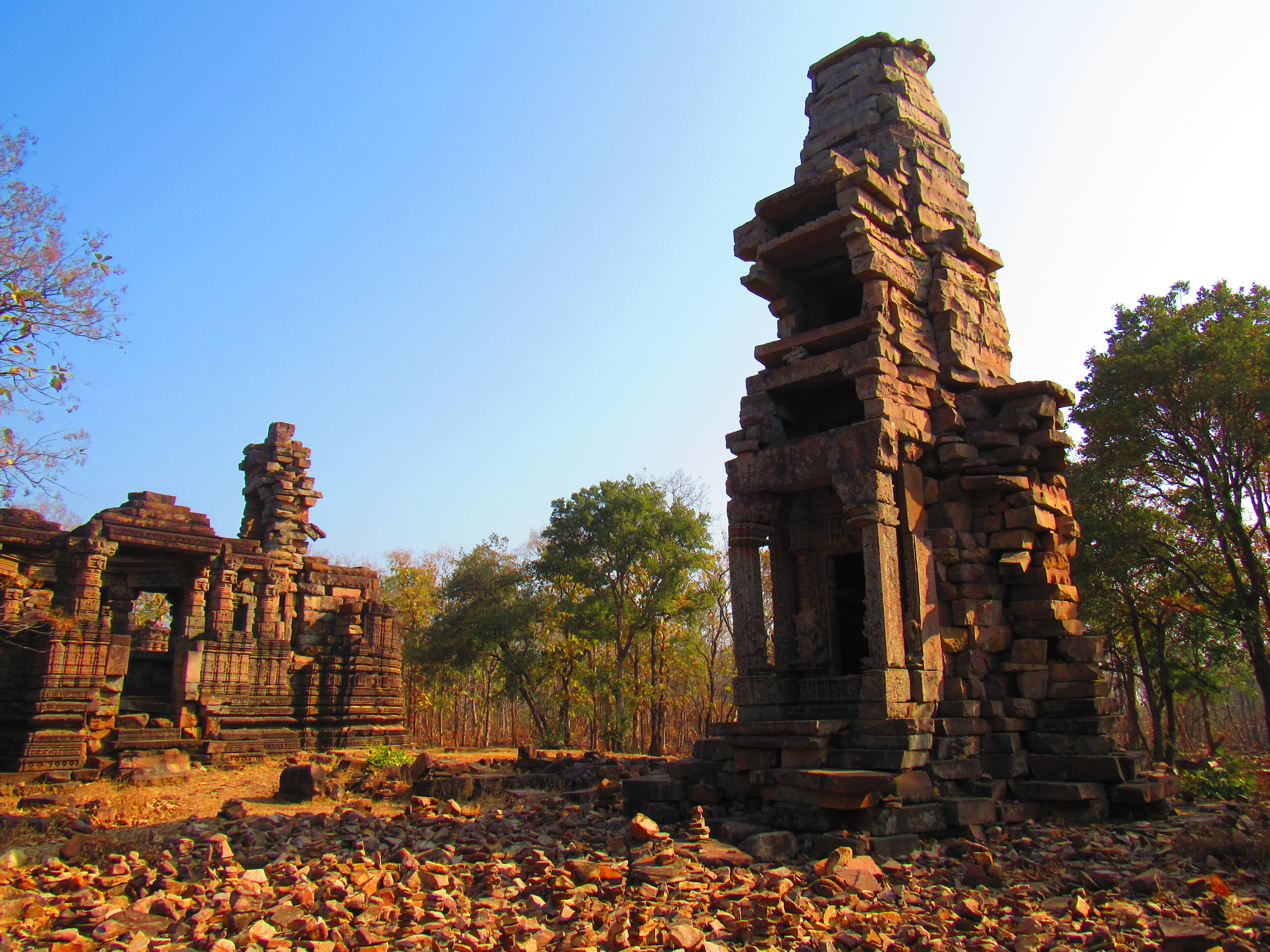
- Historical Fort of Ajaigarh

- Location in Madhya Pradesh, India
- Coordinates: 24.54°N 80.16°E
- Country: India
- State: Madhya Pradesh
- Division: Sagar
- District: Panna
- Elevation: 344 m (1,129 ft)

Population (2011)
  - Total: 16,656

Languages
  - Official: Hindi
- Time zone: UTC+5:30 (IST)
- Postal code: 488446
- Vehicle registration: MP-35

Ajaigarh or Ajaygarh is a town and a nagar panchayat in the Panna District of Madhya Pradesh state in central India. Ajaigarh is the administrative headquarters of tehsil in Panna district.

Ajaigarh State was one of the princely states of India during the period of the British Raj. The state was founded in 1785, with its capital being Ajaigarh.

== History ==
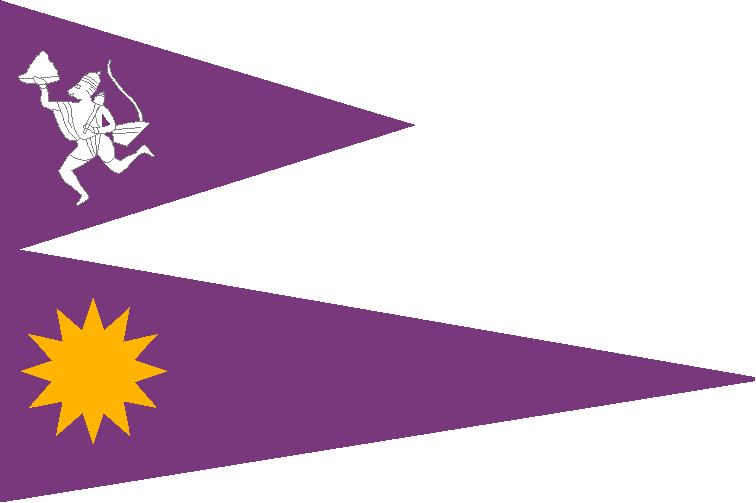
Flag of Ajaigarh state

Ajaigarh was the capital of a princely state of the same name during the British Raj. Ajaigarh was founded in 1765 by Guman Singh, a Bundela Rajput who was the nephew of Raja Pahar Singh of Jaitpur. After Ajaigarh was captured by the British in 1809, it became a princely state in the Bundelkhand Agency of the Central India Agency. It had an area of 771 square miles (2,000 km^{2}), and a population of 78,236 in 1901. The rulers bore the title of sawai maharaja. He commanded an estimated annual revenue of about £15,000/-, and paid a tribute of £460/-. The chief resided at the town of Nowgong, at the foot of the hill-fortress of Ajaigarh, from which the state took its name. This fort, situated on a steep hill, towers more than 800 feet (240 m) above the eponymous township, and contains the ruins of several temples adorned with elaborately carved sculptures. The town was often afflicted by malaria, and suffered severely from famine in 1868–69 and 1896–97.

The state acceded to the Government of India on 1 January 1950; the ruling chief was granted a privy purse of Rs. 74,700/-, and the courtesy use of his styles and titles. All of these were revoked by the government of India in 1971, at the time when these privileges were revoked from all erstwhile princes. The former princely state became part of the new Indian state of Vindhya Pradesh, and most of the territory of the former state, including the town of Ajaigarh, became part of Panna District, with a smaller portion going to Chhatarpur District. Vindhya Pradesh was merged into Madhya Pradesh on 1 November 1956.

== Geography ==
Ajaygarh is located on 24.54°N 80.16°E. It has an average elevation of 344 metres (1128 feet).

== Demographics ==
As of the 2011 India census, Ajaigarh had a population of 16,656. Males constitute 53% of the population and females 47%. Ajaigarh has an average literacy rate of 59%, which is lower than the national average of 59.5%; with 61% of the males and 39% of females literate. 16% of the population is under 6 years of age.

== Ajaigarh Fort ==
Ajaigarh or Ajaygarh Fort is among the top attractions of the region. It stands alone on a hilltop in the district of Panna and is easily accessible from Khajuraho. The fort is bordered by the Vindhya Hills and provides views of the Ken River. This fort is noted for its rich historical past and its architecture, which dates to the Chandela dynasty.

The fort is visited by both history and art lovers. This fort has two gates (earlier there were five), two temples and two rock-cut tanks, close to the northern gate. These tanks have been named as Ganga and Jamuna.

Ajaygarh Fort, also known as Ajaypal Fort, is an ancient and mysterious fort located in the Panna district of Madhya Pradesh. It was built by the Chandela kings and stands atop a high hill. At the main entrance of the fort, there is an old inscription that no one has been able to decipher till today. It is believed that this inscription holds the secret path to a hidden treasure.

== Gallery ==
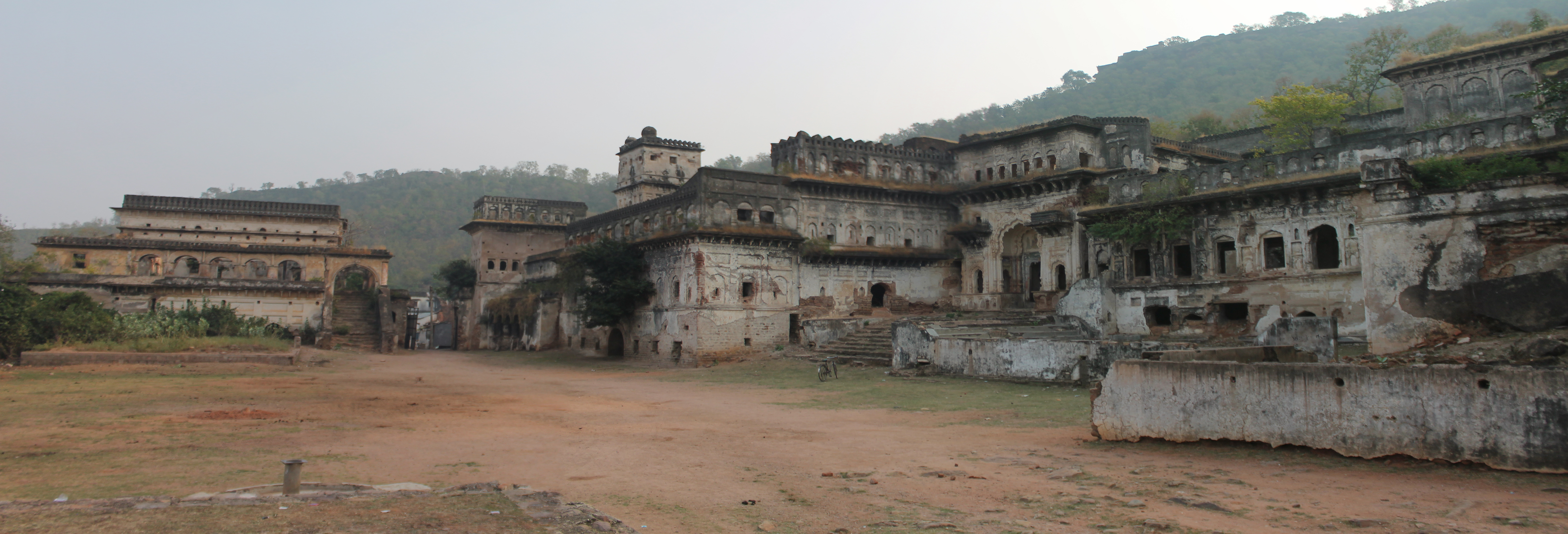
Panoramic view of Ajaygarh Palace
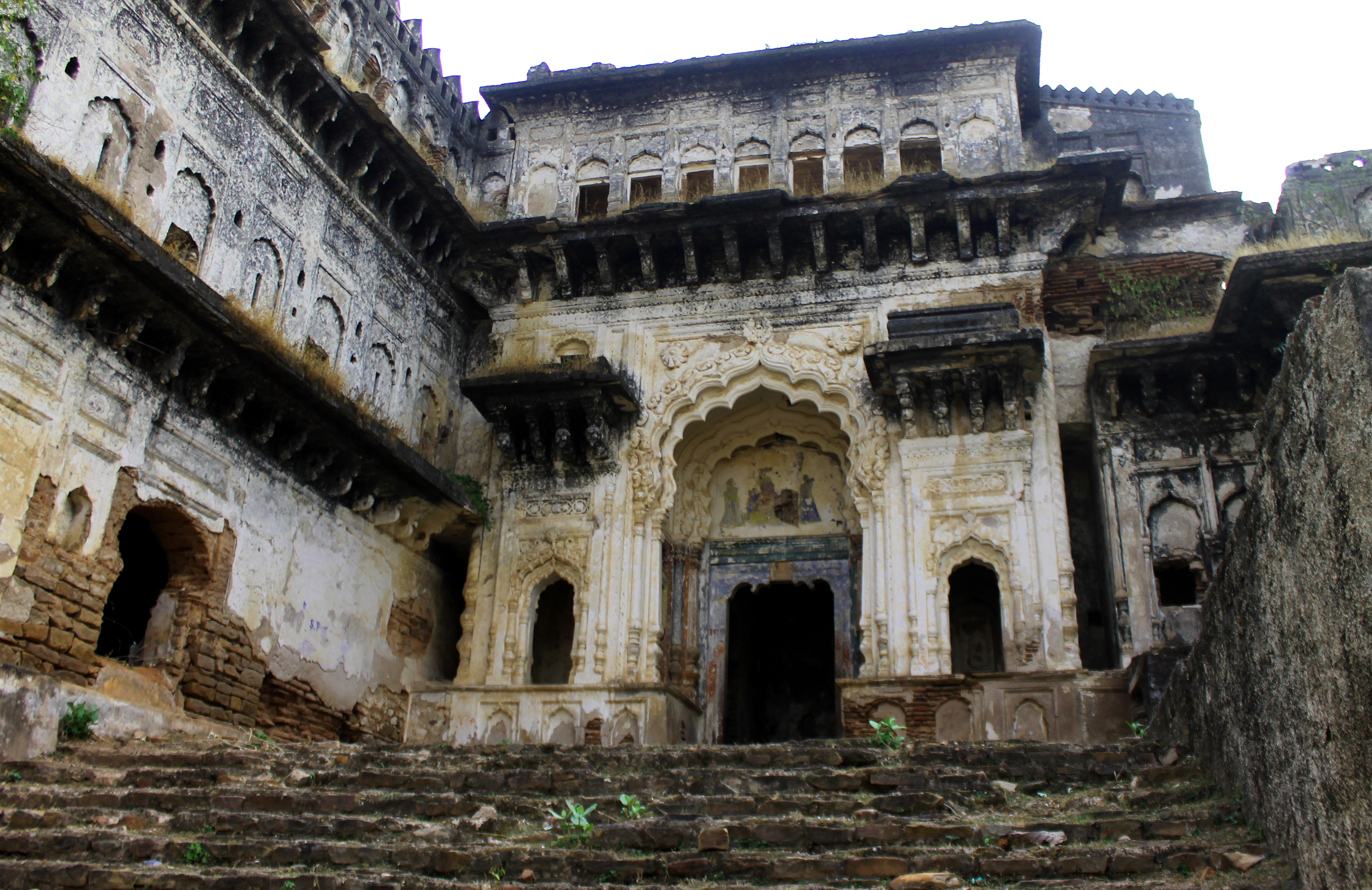
Entrance gate of Ajaigarh Palace

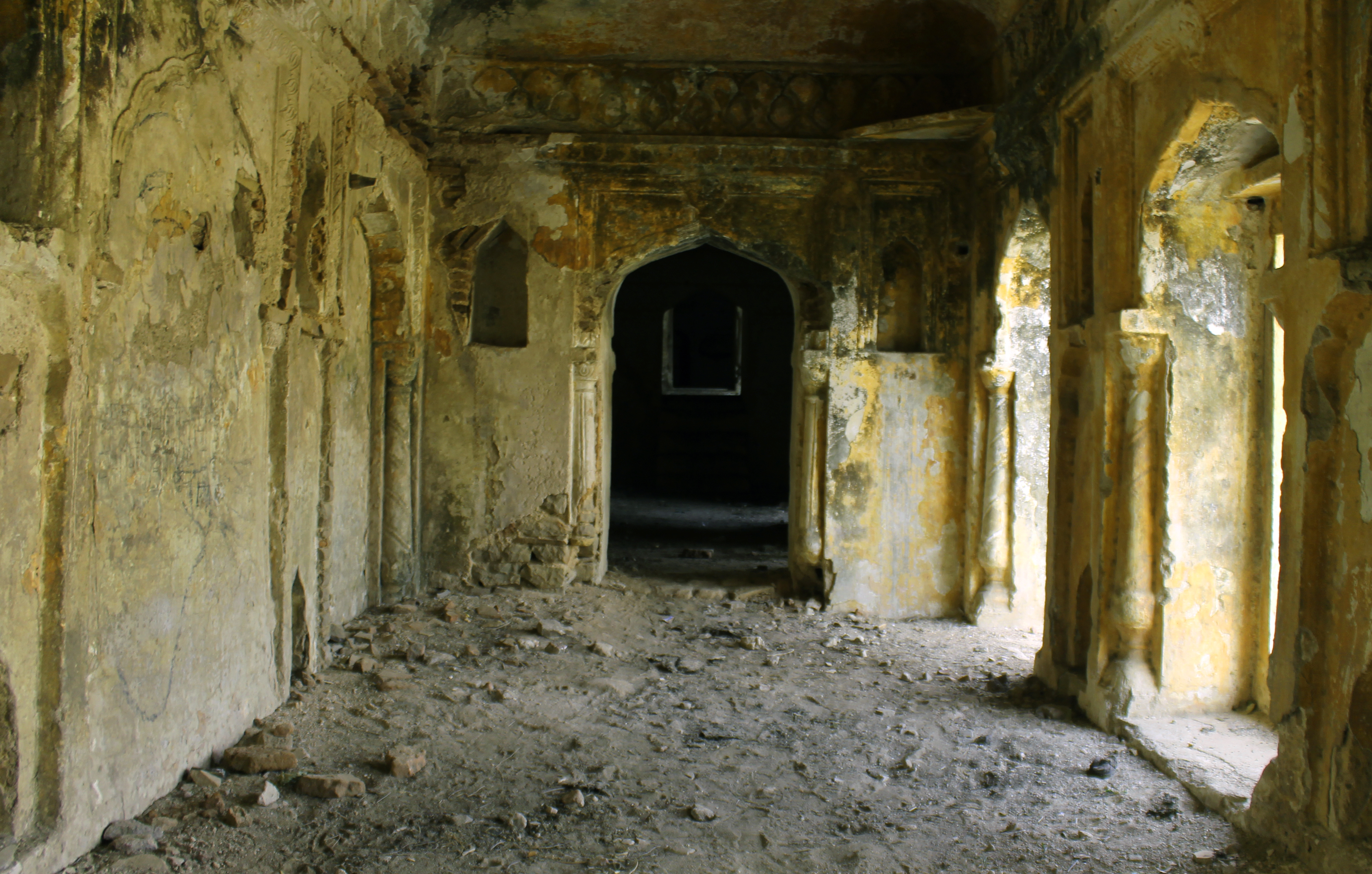
Inside of Ajaigarh Palace

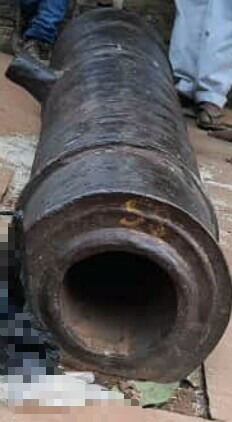
Cannon of Ajaigarh in Ajaigarh fort
