= Sagar division =

Administrative geographical unit of the state of Madhya Pradesh, India

Coordinates: 23.83°N 78.71°E

Map of Sagar division, within Madhya Pradesh

Sagar Division is an administrative geographical unit of the state of Madhya Pradesh, India. The city of Sagar is its administrative headquarters. As of 2023, the division consists of the districts of Sagar, Chhatarpur, Damoh, Panna, Tikamgarh, and Niwari.

Sagar division contains part of the cultural Bundelkhand region of Madhya Pradesh, which contains historical sites such as Khajuraho and Orchha. The Ken, Betwa, Dhasan and Sunar are the major rivers of the Division.

== Major cities ==
1. Sagar
2. Chhatarpur
3. Damoh
4. Tikamgarh
5. Bina
6. Panna
7. Khurai
8. Nowgong
9. Garhakota
10. Hatta
11. Rehli
12. Banda
13. Rahatgarh
14. Deori
15. Prithvipur
16. Niwari
17. Khajuraho
18. Patharia
19. Ajaygarh
20. Pawai
21. Bijawar
22. Jatara
23. Orchha
24. Baldeogarh
25. Shahgarh

== Tourist attractions ==
- Natural
1. Panna National Park
2. Nauradehi Wildlife Sanctuary
3. Veerangana Durgavati Wildlife Sanctuary
- Historical
1. Eran
2. Khajuraho
3. Orchha
4. Dhubela
