= Raneh Falls =

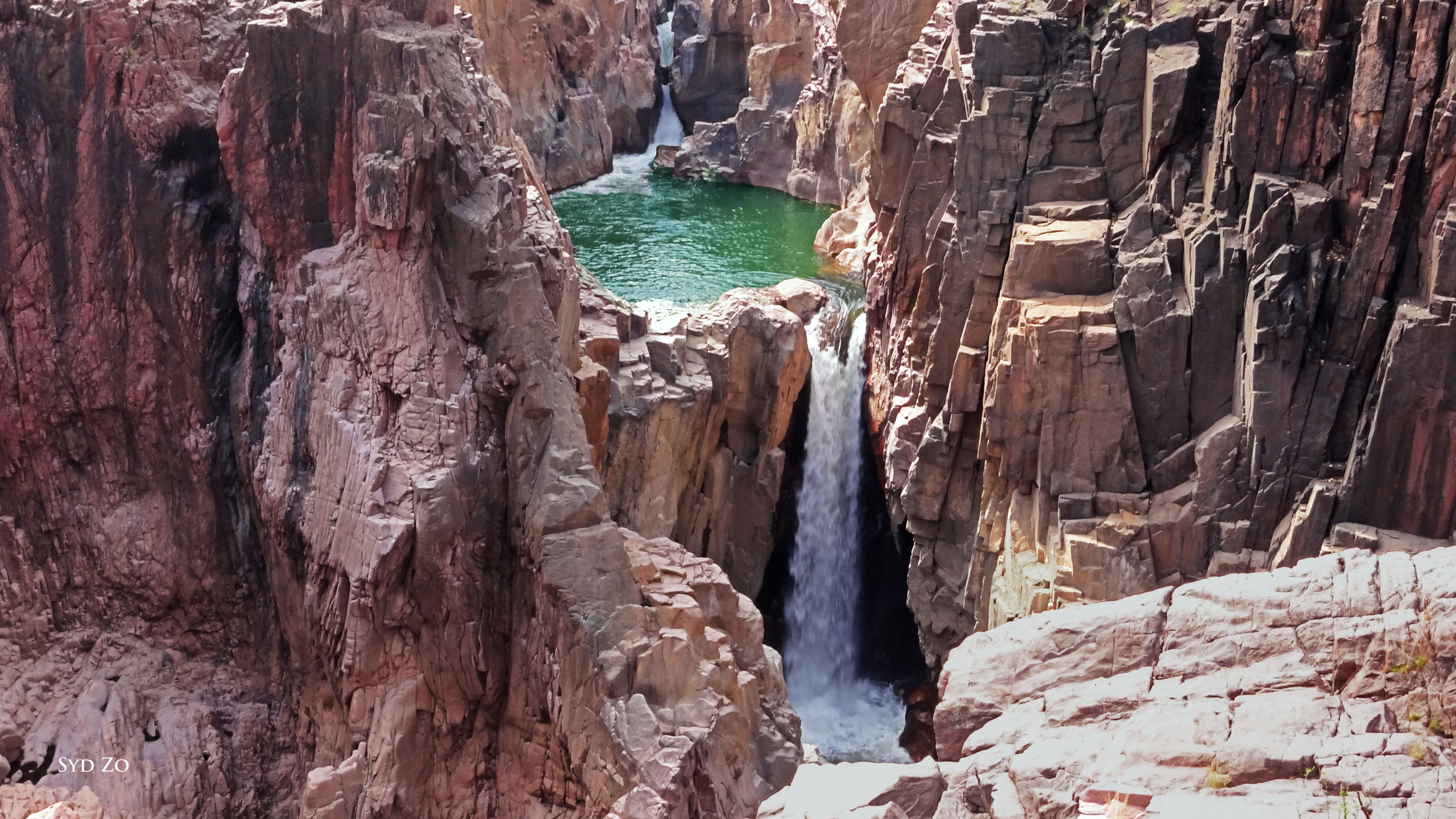
- Raneh fall formed by Ken river
- Interactive map of Raneh Falls
- Location: Khajuraho, Madhya Pradesh, India
- Coordinates: 24.884°N 80.044°E
- Total height: About 30 metres (98 ft)
- Watercourse: Ken River

The Raneh Falls is a natural waterfall on the Ken River, located in Khajuraho in the Indian state of Madhya Pradesh.

== The falls ==
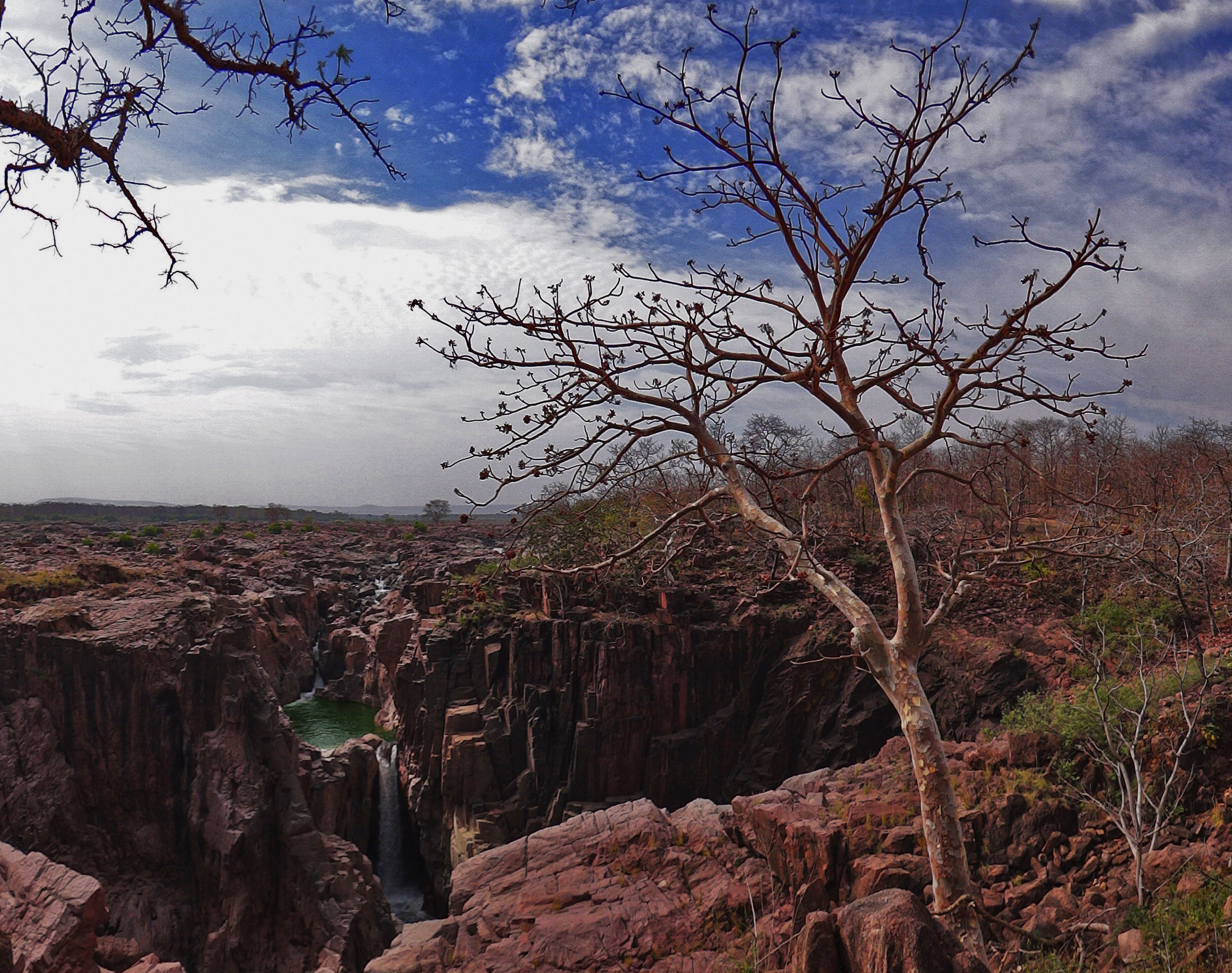
A Sterculia urens or Ghost tree with Raneh falls in the backdrop

The Ken River forms a 5 kilometres (3.1 mi) long, and 30 metres (98 ft) deep canyon made of pure crystalline granite in varying shades of colours ranging from pink and red to grey. There is a series of waterfalls in the canyon. The larger and smaller falls run all through the year. Other seasonal falls appear during monsoons.

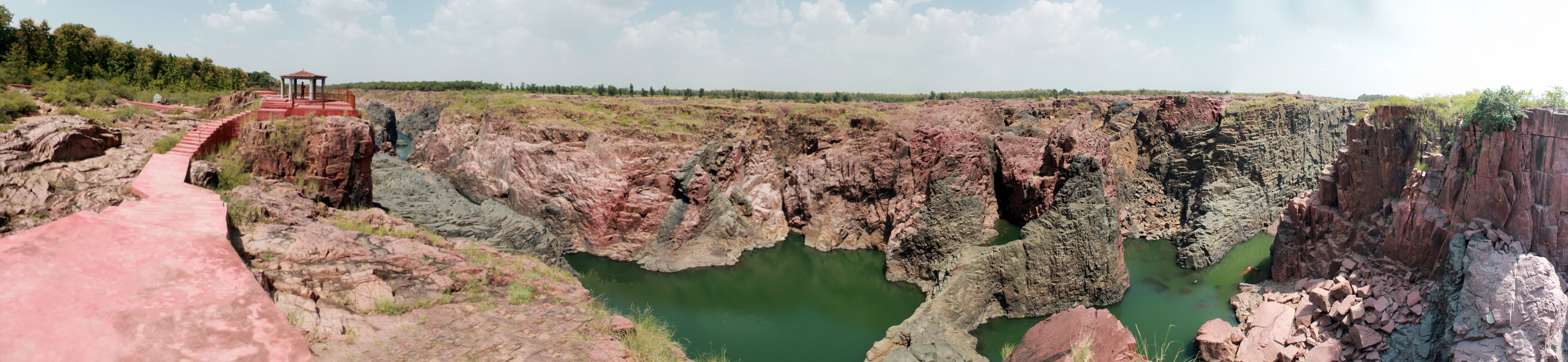
Panoramic view of Raneh falls

== Location ==
It is about 20 kilometres (12 mi) away from Khajuraho. The Ken Gharial Sanctuary is located at the confluence of the Ken and Khudar rivers further down from Reneh Falls. The Ken river here runs through a narrow gorge of igneous rocks rich in Granite and Dolomite. The Pandav Falls in Panna National Park is also located nearby.

== See also ==
- List of waterfalls
- List of waterfalls in India
