= Saraswati Gyan Mandir =

Central Temple of Chittagong University, Bangladesh

- সরস্বতী জ্ঞান মন্দির
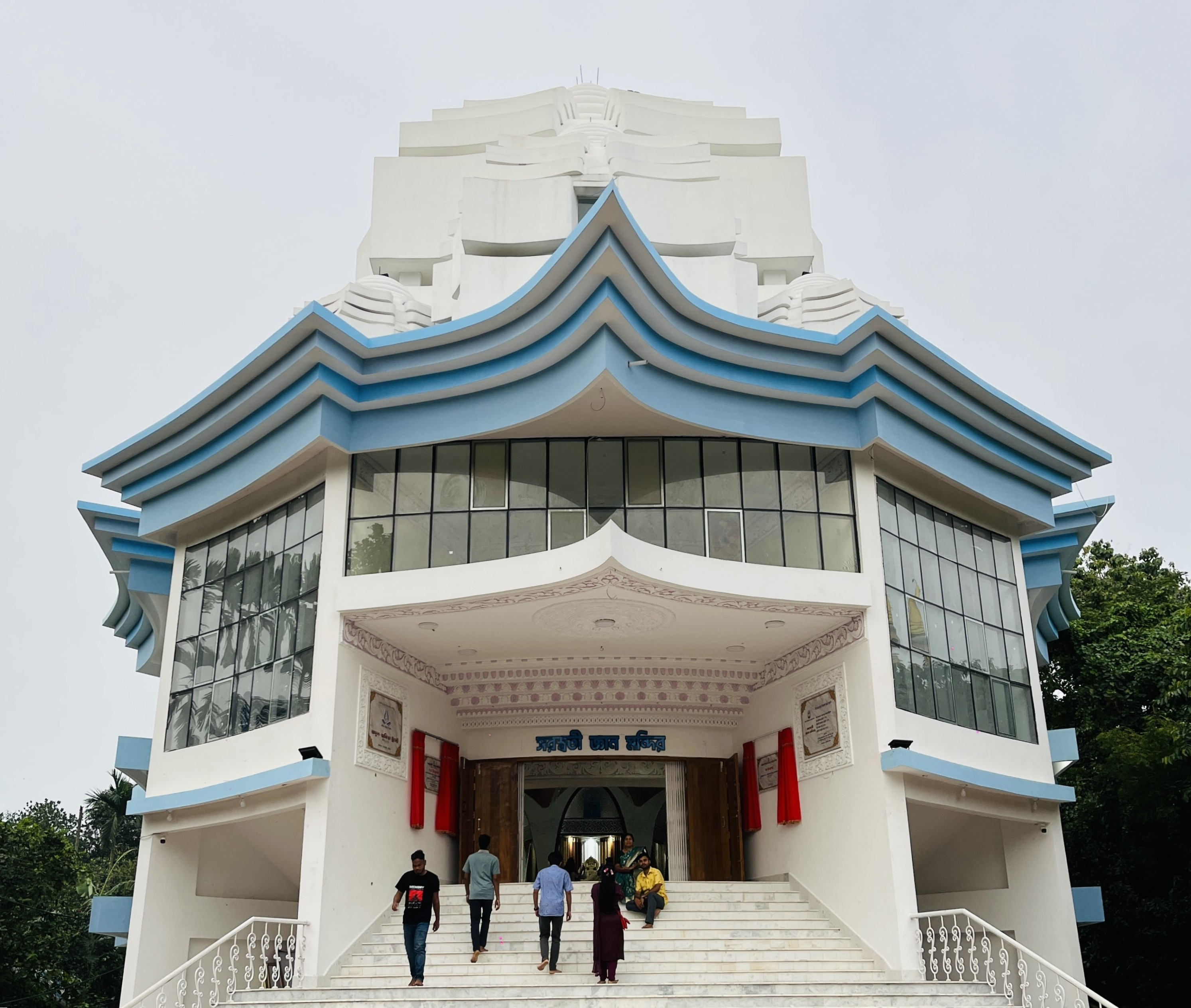

- Location within Chittagong division Location within Bangladesh

Religion
- Affiliation: Hinduism
- District: Chittagong District
- Deity: Saraswati
- Festival: Saraswati Puja

Location
- Location: University of Chittagong
- Country: Bangladesh
- Coordinates: 22.483734°N 91.792911°E

Architecture
- Groundbreaking: 4 February 2019
- Completed: 20 April 2026; 6 months ago
- Site area: 20,000 square feet

Saraswati Gyan Mandir is the central temple of University of Chittagong. In 2011, the then university administration allocated land adjacent to the university’s Gate No. 2 for the construction of the temple. On 4 February 2019, the work of laying the full foundation stone began on nearly 20,000 square feet of land. The main structure of the temple was fully financed by the Adul-Anita Foundation. Later, on 20 April 2026, on the occasion of Akshaya Tritiya, the temple was inaugurated and the sacred deities were consecrated. It is the first and only “Saraswati Gyan Mandir” in Bangladesh.

== History ==
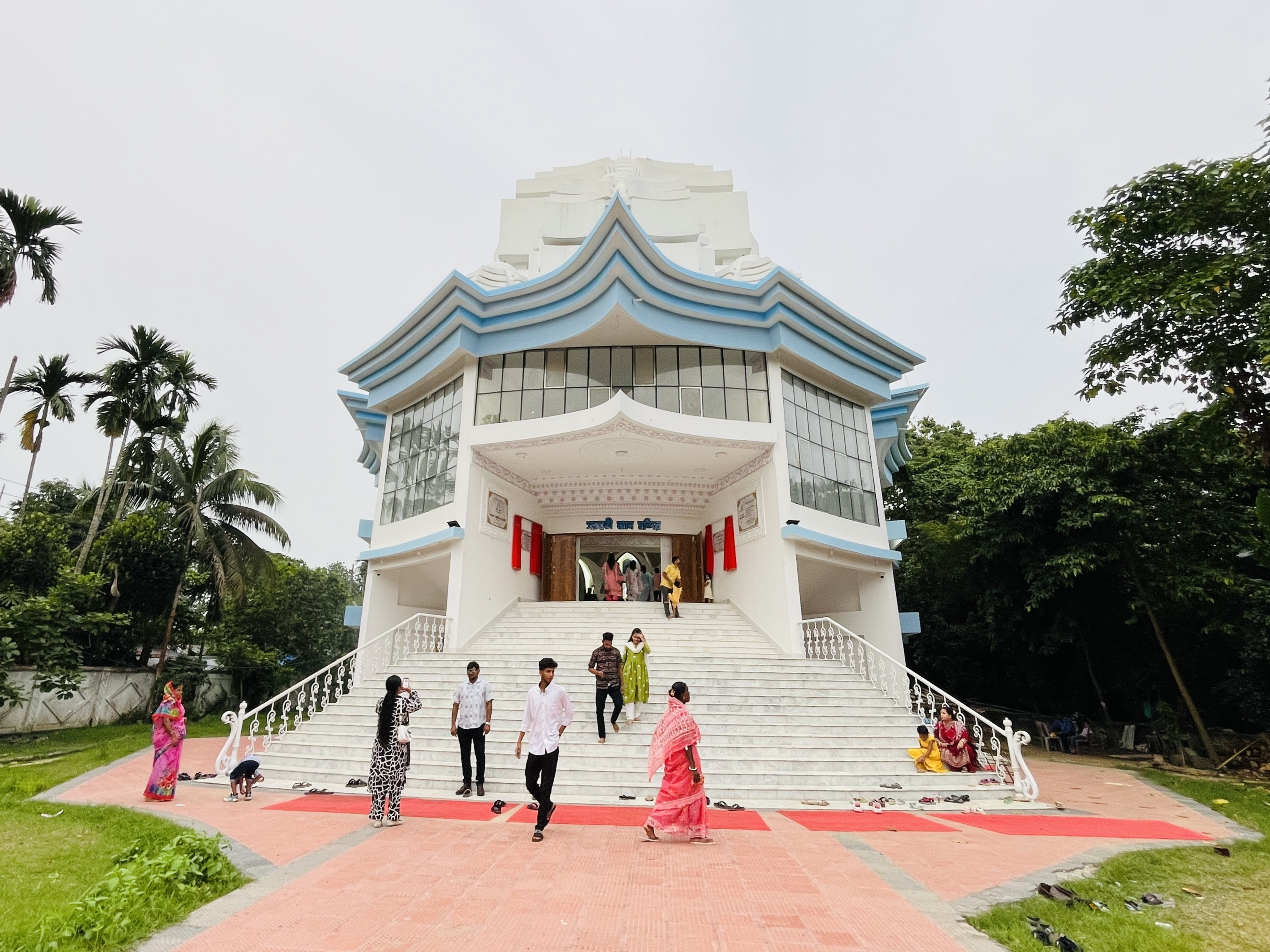
Saraswati Gyan Mandir

Since the establishment of University of Chittagong, Saraswati Puja had been celebrated regularly on the campus. However, for a long time, the absence of a permanent place of worship created various limitations in organizing religious activities for Hindu students. In this context, following demands raised by the Sanatan Dharma Parishad—formed by the university’s teachers, students, and officials—the university administration allocated a site for the construction of a temple in 2011. In 2012, the proposal was approved by the university syndicate. Subsequently, with the cooperation of the university administration, alumni, teachers, and well-wishers, infrastructural development activities of the temple premises began. Initially, boundary walls, retention walls, and land-filling works were completed. During these works, the annual Saraswati Puja was organized at that place under the open sky.

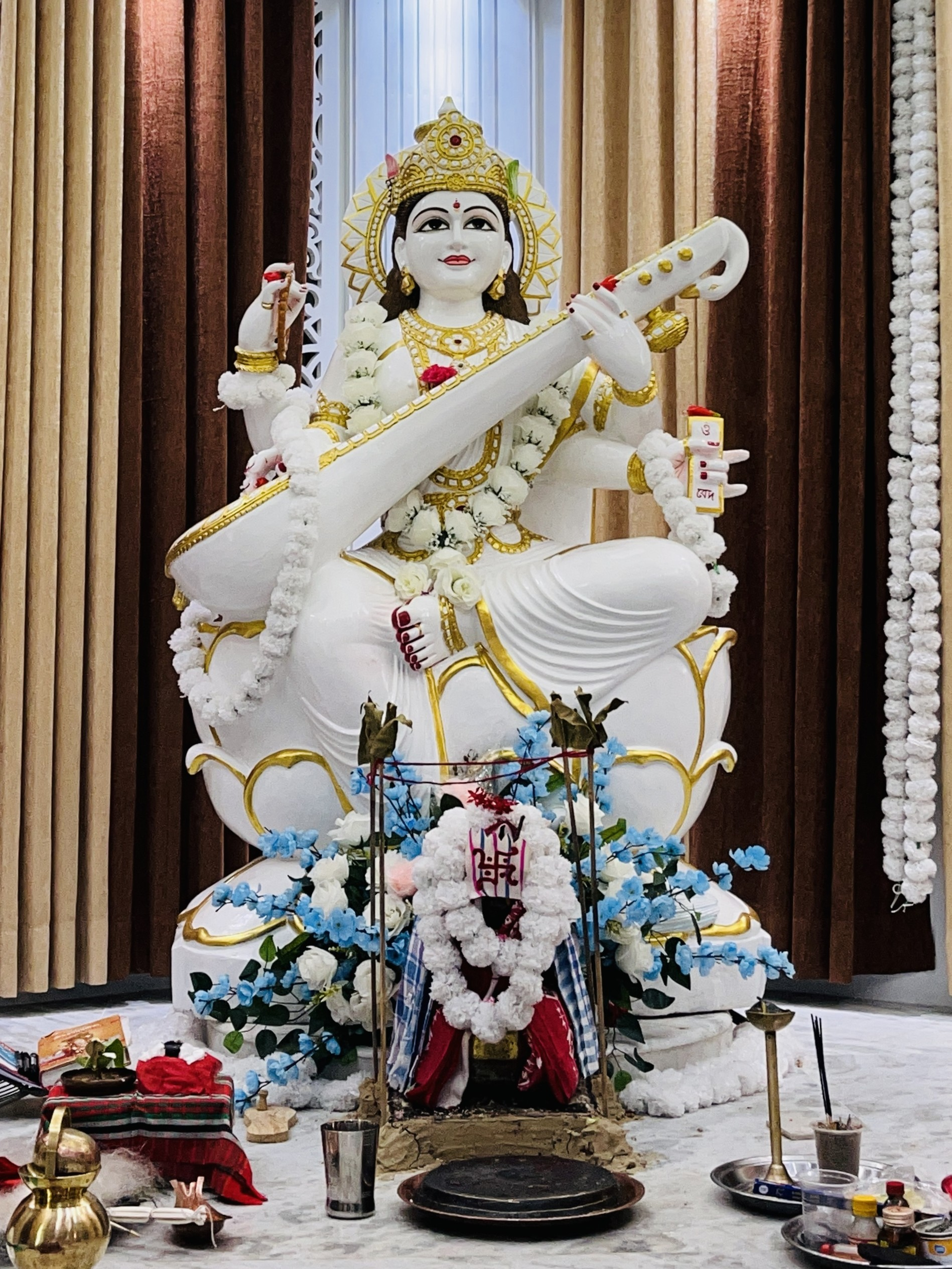
Saraswati idol of Saraswati Gyan Mandir

On 4 February 2019, the formal foundation stone of the temple construction project was laid. The main structure, named “Saraswati Gyan Mandir,” was fully financed by Adul Kanti Chowdhury and Anita Chowdhury, trustees of the Adul-Anita Foundation. The construction work was supervised by the Temple Construction and Management Committee, formed with university teachers and officials, while the overall coordination was carried out by the CU Sanatan Dharma Parishad. In addition, various individuals and well-wishers provided financial and organizational support for the project. The architectural design and engineering support for the temple were provided by Astro, while interior design and technical assistance were provided by The-Ad Communication. The university authorities also extended administrative support, security arrangements, construction materials, and various utility services.

On 20 April 2026, on the occasion of Akshaya Tritiya, the temple was formally inaugurated and the consecration of the sacred deities was completed. Amir Khasru Mahmud Chowdhury, Minister of Finance and Planning of the Government of the People’s Republic of Bangladesh, officially inaugurated the temple.

== Gallery ==
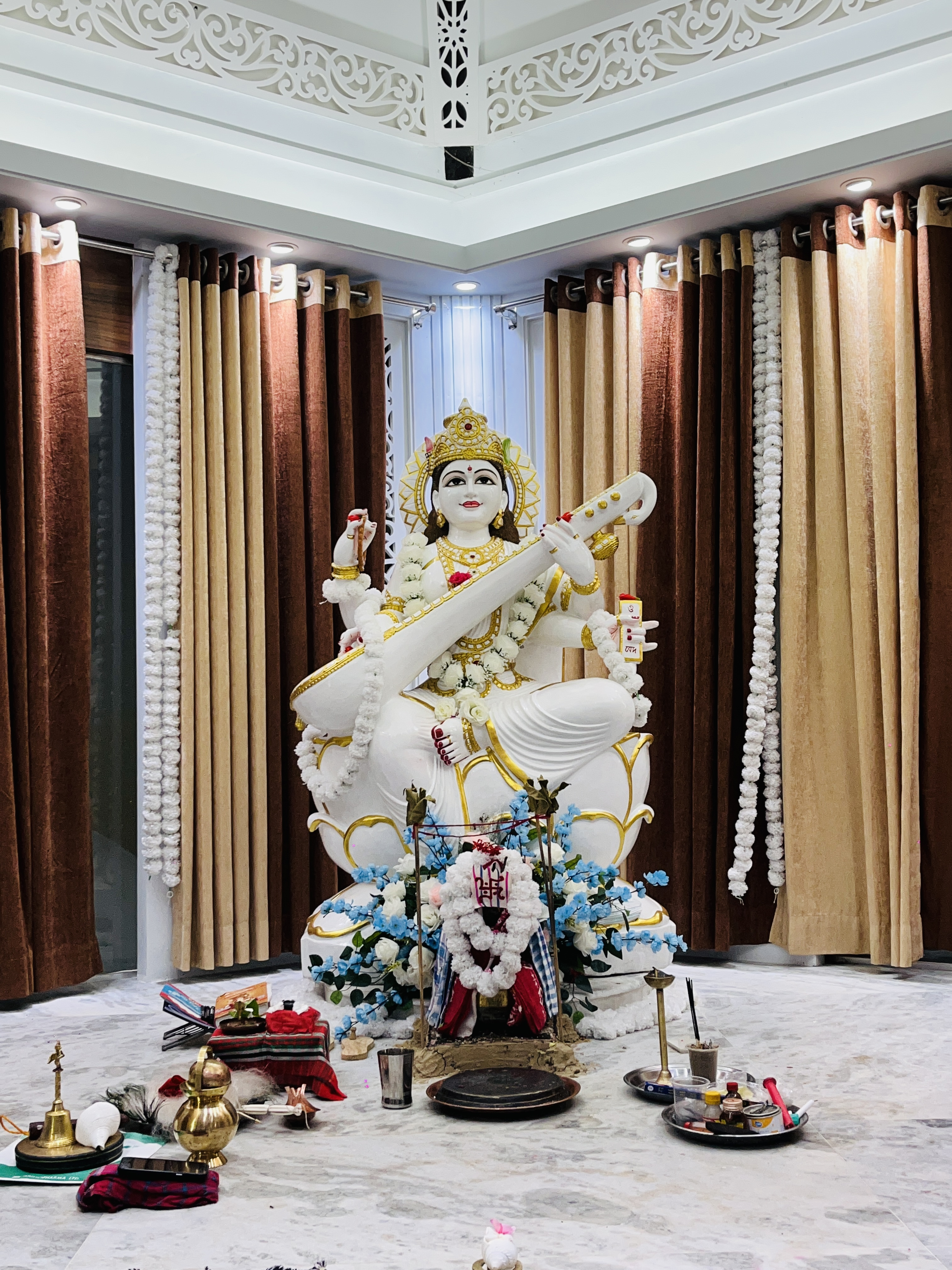

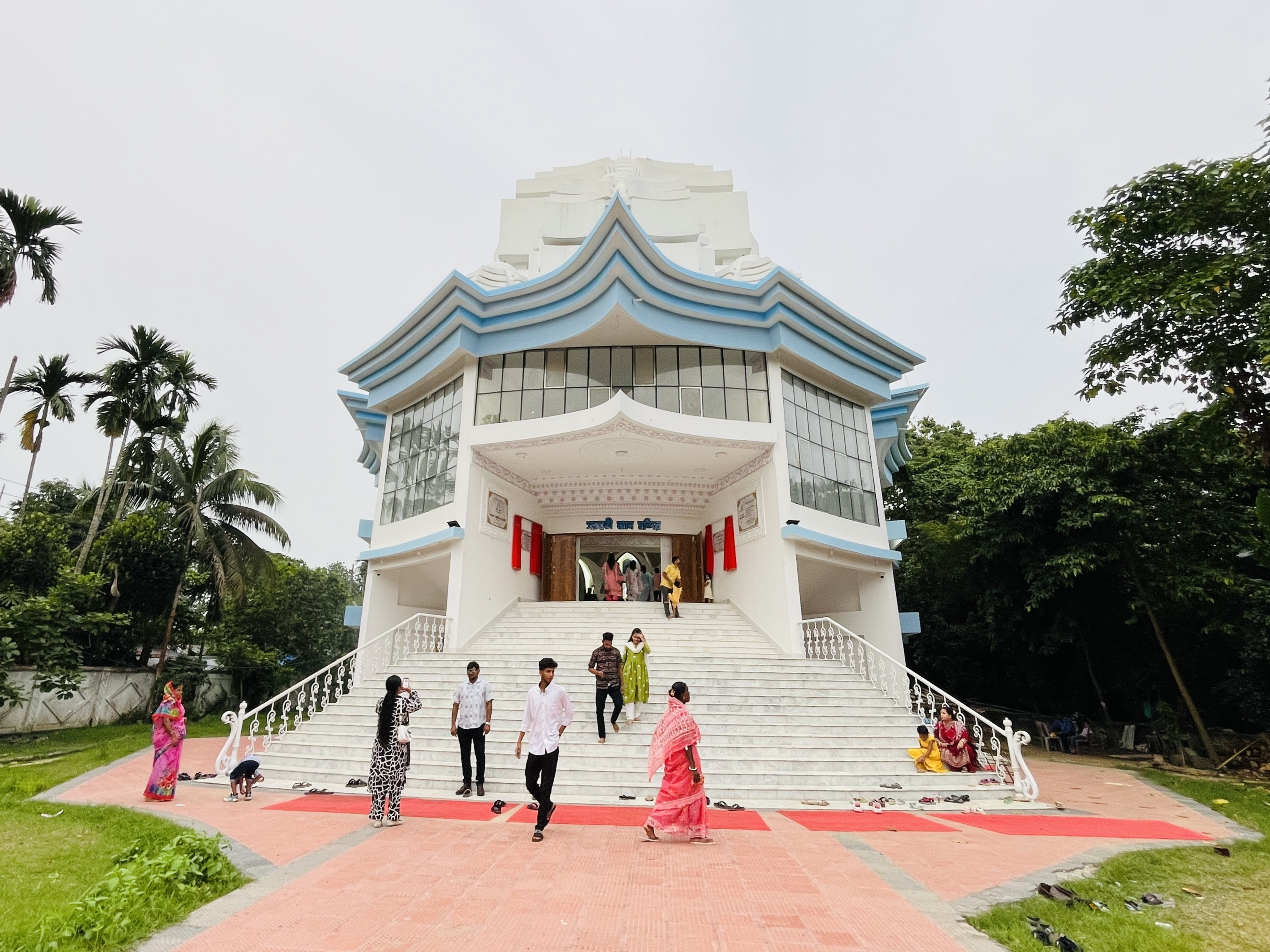

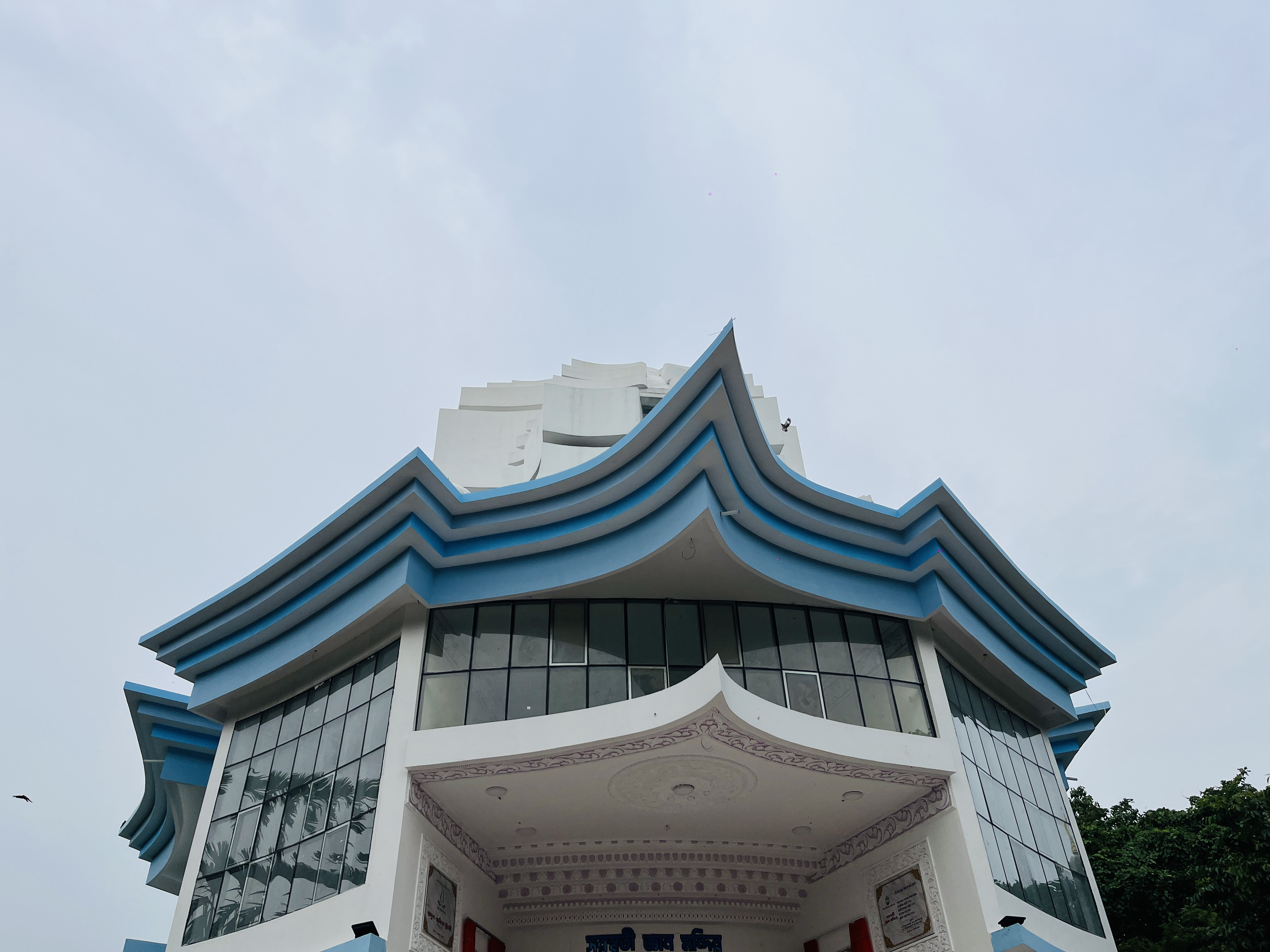

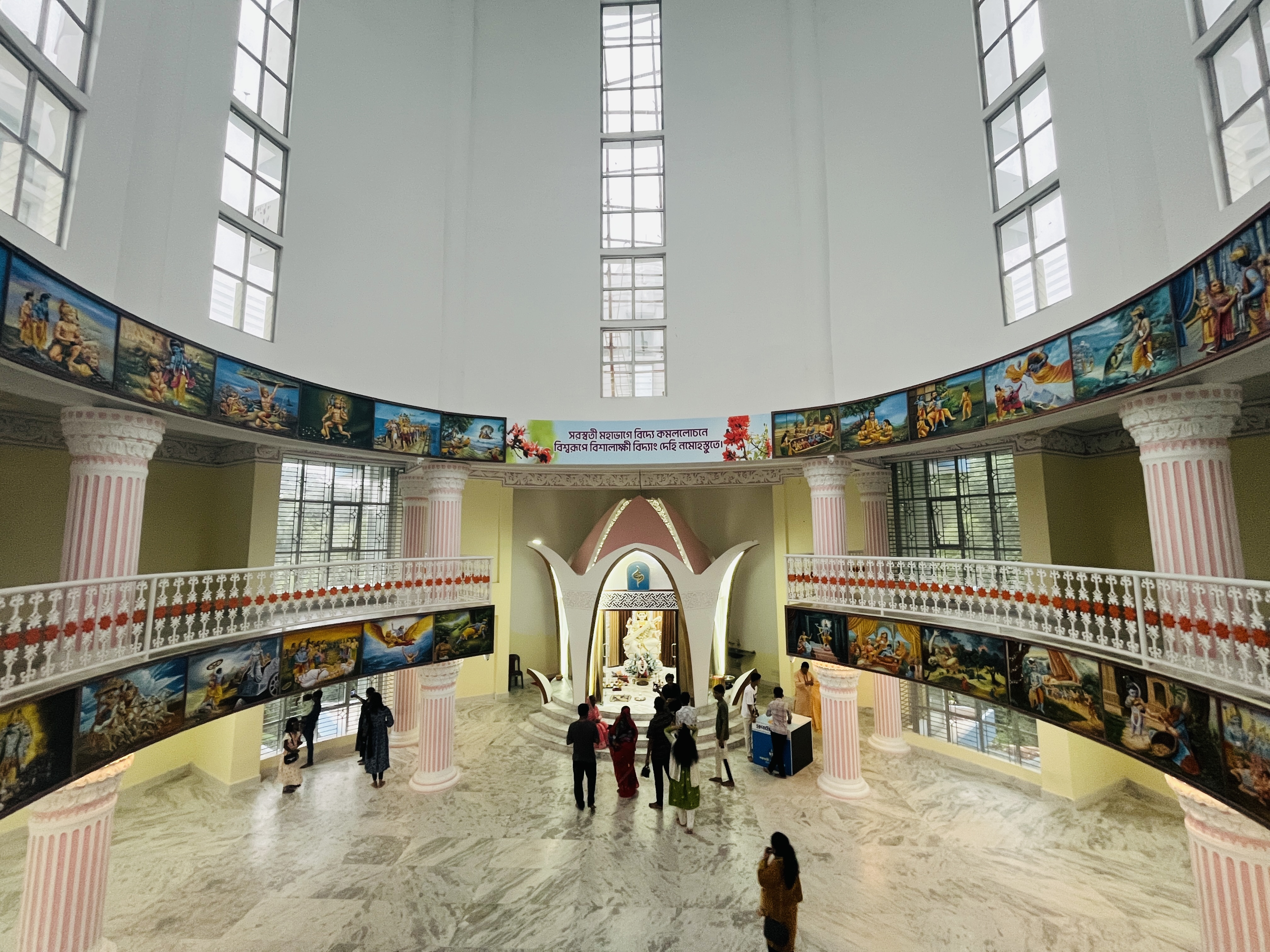

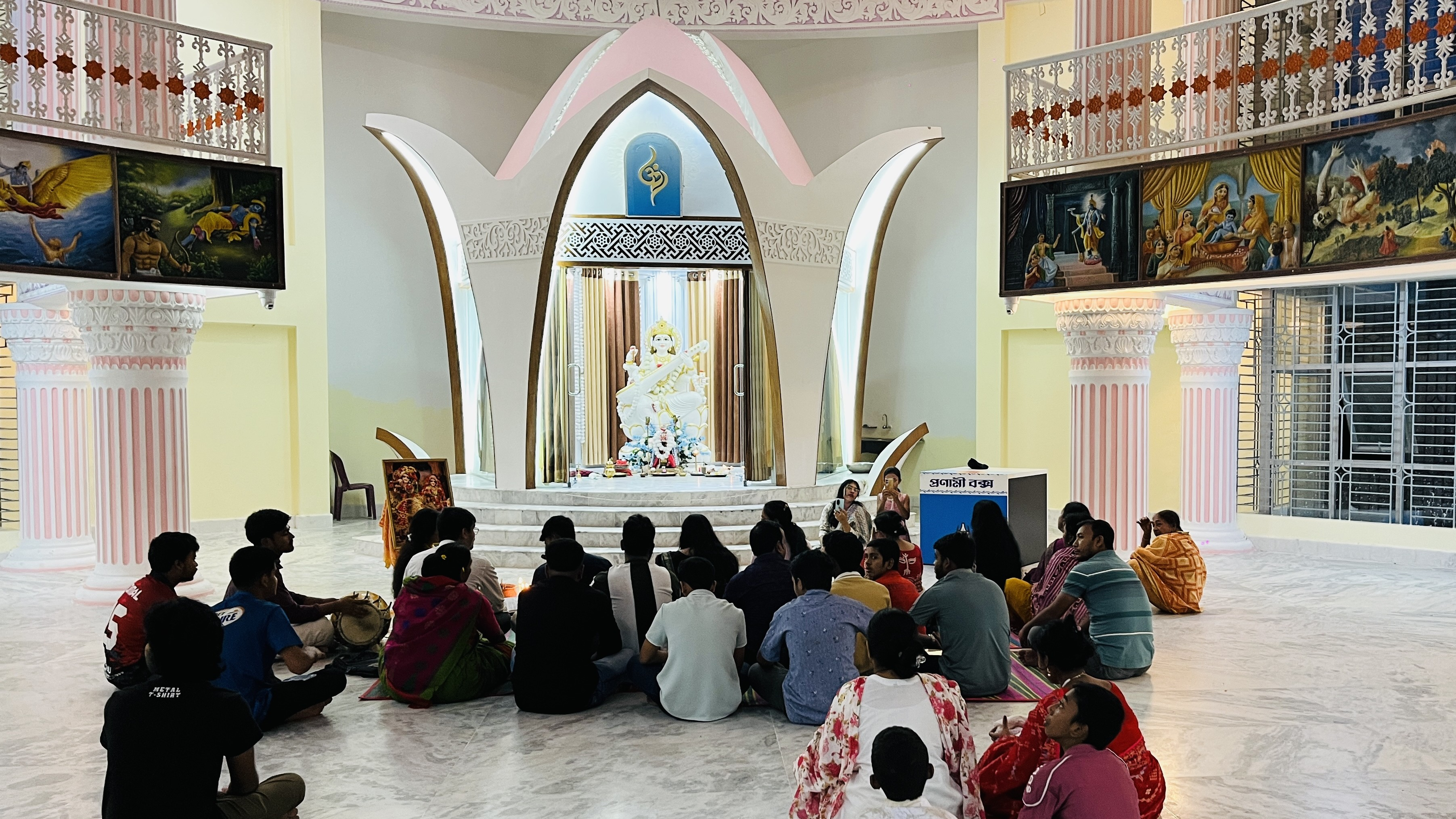

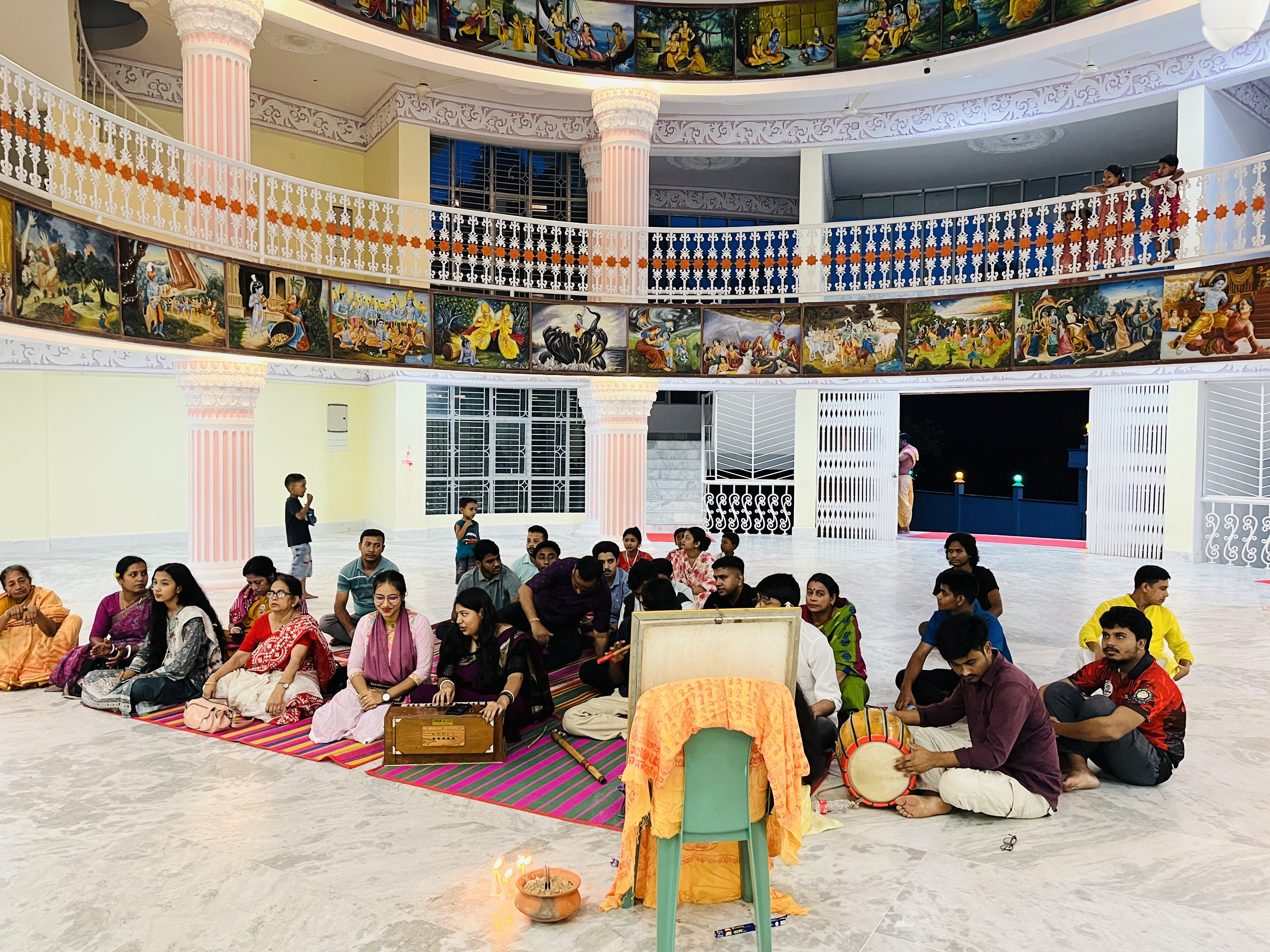
