= Pawai =

- Town
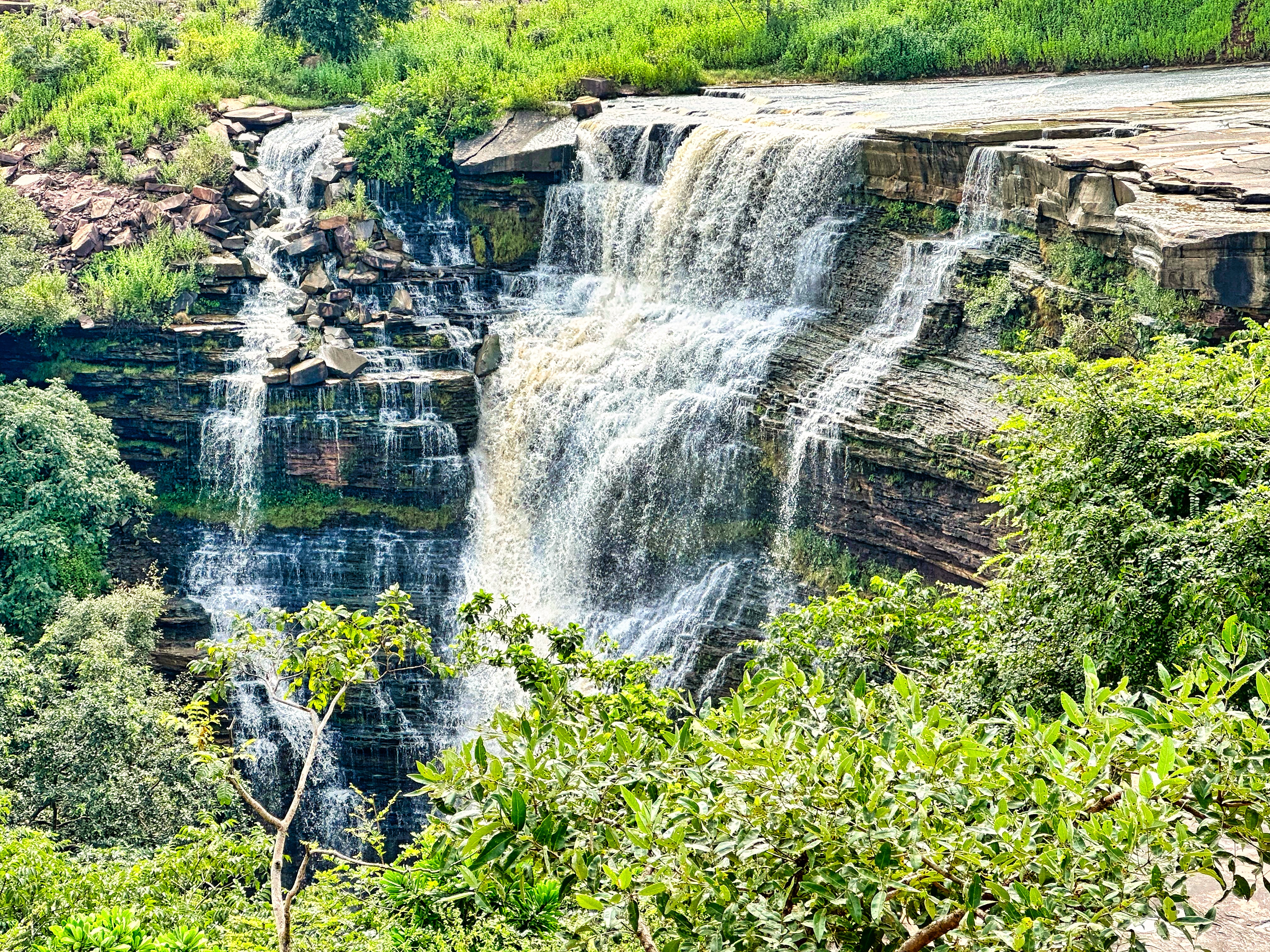
- Waterfall in Pawai

- Location in Madhya Pradesh, India
- Coordinates: 24.27°N 80.17°E
- Country: India
- State: Madhya Pradesh
- District: Panna
- Elevation: 344 m (1,129 ft)

Population (2001)
  - Total: 14,465

Languages
  - Official: Hindi
- Time zone: UTC+5:30 (IST)
- Postal code: 488220
- Vehicle registration: MP-35

Pawai is a town and a nagar panchayat in the Panna district of Madhya Pradesh state in central India. Pawai is the administrative headquarters of Pawai tehsil, one of the largest tehsils of Panna district.

== Geography ==
Pawai is at 24.27°N 80.17°E. It has an average elevation of 344 metres (1128 feet). and it's located on bank of the Patne River.

== Demographics ==
As of 2011 India census, Pawai had a population of 14,465. Males constitute 53% of the population and females 47%. Pawai has an average literacy rate of 57%, lower than the national average of 59.5%: male literacy is 65%, and female literacy is 47%. In Pawai, 19% of the population is under 6 years of age.

== Climate ==
Pawai has a subtropical climate. Summers are hot and temperatures can reach 40–45 Celsius. Winters are cold and the minimum temperature generally remains under 8°C. Monsoon touches this region in June and continues till mid-September. The best time to visit is during winters (October to February).

== Tourist attractions ==
- Kalehi Mata Temple - Kalehi Mata Temple is a natural and divine temple located in pawai.
- Chandi Falls - Chandi Fall's is natural falls located in Pawai.

== Transportation ==
Pawai is situated on the road connecting Panna to Katni, from here a major road connects Saleha, Nagod, Satna to Pawai, daily bus service is available in Pawai which connects it to the nearby towns.

== See also ==
- Pawai (Vidhan Sabha constituency)
