= Ken River =

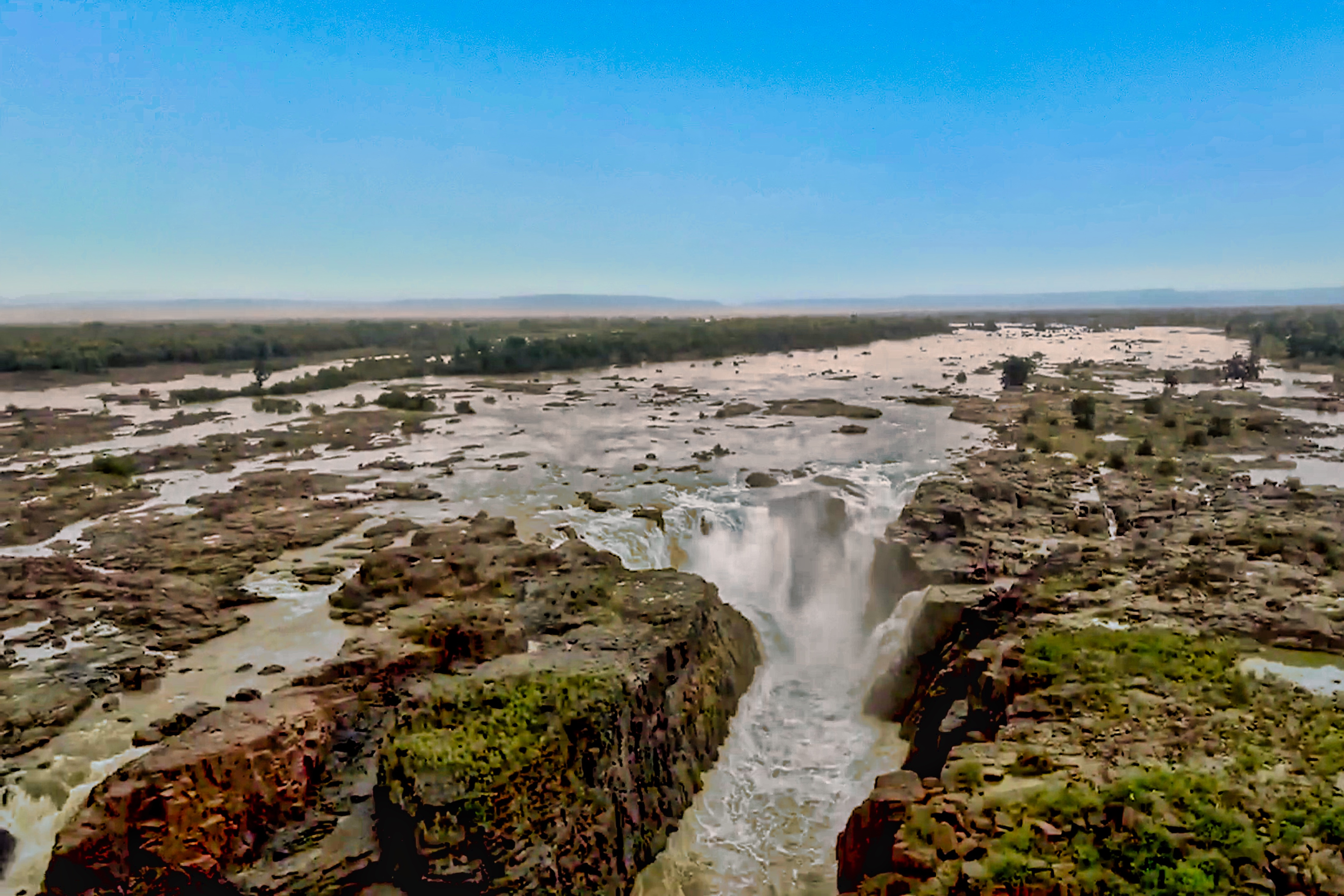
- Ken river
- Interactive Map

Location
- Country: India
- State: Madhya Pradesh, Uttar Pradesh
- Region: Bundelkhand

Physical characteristics
- Source: Ahirgawan
  - location: Kaimur Range, Katni district, Madhya Pradesh
  - elevation: 550 m (1,800 ft)
- Mouth: Yamuna River
  - location: Chilla Ghat, Banda district, Uttar Pradesh
  - coordinates: 25°46′N 80°31′E
- Length: 427 km (265 mi)
- Discharge
  - average: 310 m^{3}/s (11,000 cu ft/s)

The Ken River is one of the major rivers in the Bundelkhand region of central India and flows through the states of Madhya Pradesh and Uttar Pradesh. It is a tributary of the Yamuna.

== Course ==
The Ken River originates near the village Ahirgawan on the north-west slopes of Barner Range in Katni district. After 427 km (265 mi), it merges with Yamuna river at Chilla village in Banda district in Uttar Pradesh at 25°46′N 80°31′E. It flows for 292 km (181 mi) in Madhya Pradesh, 84 km (52 mi) in Uttar Pradesh, and 51 km (32 mi) forms the boundary between the two states.

Crossing the Bijawar-Panna Plateau, the Ken River cuts a 60 km (37 mi) long, and 150–180 m (490–590 ft) deep gorge. Several streams join in this gorge making waterfalls. The Ken valley separates the Rewa Plateau from the Satna Plateau.
