= Panna, Madhya Pradesh =

Panna
- City
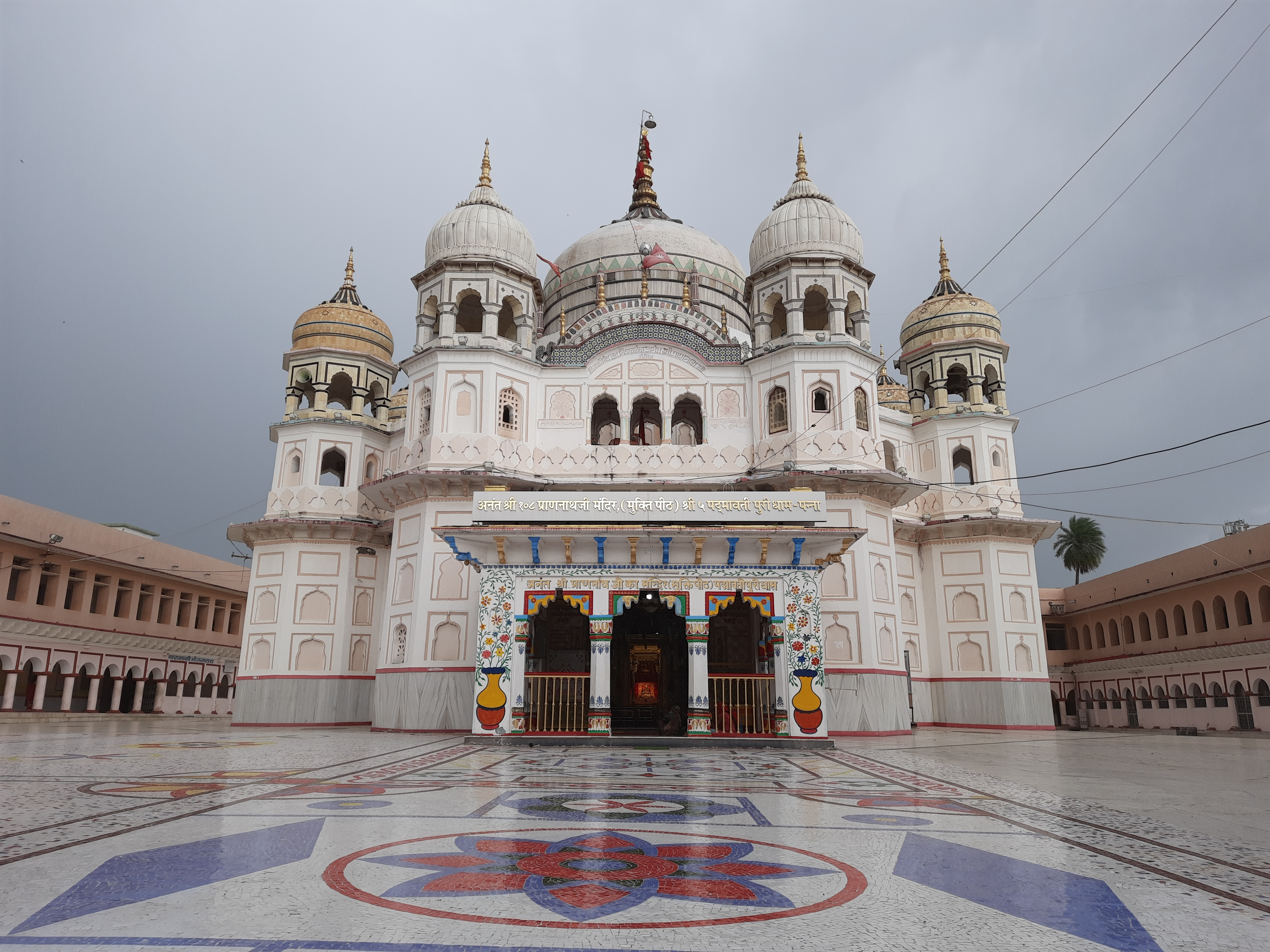
- Padmavati puri dham, Panna

- Location in Madhya Pradesh, India
- Coordinates: 24°43′13.562″N 80°11′10.549″E
- Country: India
- State: Madhya Pradesh
- District: Panna
- Elevation: 411 m (1,348 ft)

Population (2011)
  - Total: 59,091

Languages
  - Official: Hindi
- Time zone: UTC+5:30 (IST)
- Postal code: 488001
- ISO 3166 code: IN-MP
- Vehicle registration: MP- 35
- Website: panna.nic.in

Panna is a city and a municipality in Panna district in the Indian state of Madhya Pradesh. It is known for its diamond mines and temples. It is the administrative centre of Panna District.

== History ==
Panna was a Bundela Rajput State. It was a Gond settlement until the 13th or 17th century (cite reference), when the Gondi were defeated by the Chandelas they migrated to other parts of Madhya Pradesh. Until that date, there were many rulers of the area. The famous mandir of Padmavatipuri Dham, adorned with divine lustre, is located in Panna town at the centre of Vindhyachal in Madhya Pradesh. The itinerant sage Mahamati Prannath and his disciples reached Panna with a divine message of awakening one's soul. Seeing a desert island, he decided to unfurl the flag of Jagani there. He helped the king Chhatrasal and adorned him with the title of Maharaja. He remained there for eleven years, and took samadhi inside the dome. The place, therefore, is known as the seat of salvation [Muktipitha] or Padmavatipuri Dham.

Panna was the capital of Chhatar Sal, the Bundela Rajput leader who led a revolt against the Mughal Empire. Upon his death in 1732, his kingdom was divided among his sons, with one-third of the kingdom going to his ally, the Maratha Peshwa Baji Rao I.

The Kingdom of Panna went to Harde Sah, the eldest son of Chhatar Sal Of Bundela Rajput Clan. In the early 19th century, Panna became a princely state of British India, and gained control states of the states of Nagod and Sohawal. Raja Nirpat Singh assisted the British in the Revolt of 1857, and the British rewarded him with the title maharaja. Maharaja Mahendra Yadvendra Singh acceded to the Government of India on 1 January 1950, and the kingdom became Panna District of the new Indian state of Vindhya Pradesh. Vindhya Pradesh was merged into Madhya Pradesh on 1 November 1956.

== Tourism ==
Panna has a tiger reserve which is called Panna National Park. The sightings of tigers in Panna have fallen over recent years, and official tiger population figures were disputed by naturalists. There were plans to relocate two tigresses to Panna in 2009, which happened, but the last male tiger meanwhile disappeared. A male tiger was relocated there. One of the relocated tigresses gave birth to three cubs in 2010. The reserve is home to a wide variety of other animals, many of which can be seen at closer quarters than in other reserves, because Panna has fewer visitors. There are jungle lodges and hotels near the reserve, it can also be reached from Khajuraho. Raneh fall, Pandav fall, brahspati kund and lakhanpur rain fall are also sites tourists visit during monsoon. Panna is also famous for its temples. Temples include Shree jugal Kishore ji, pran nath ji, Jagannath swami ji, ram Mandir and Govind dev ji temple.

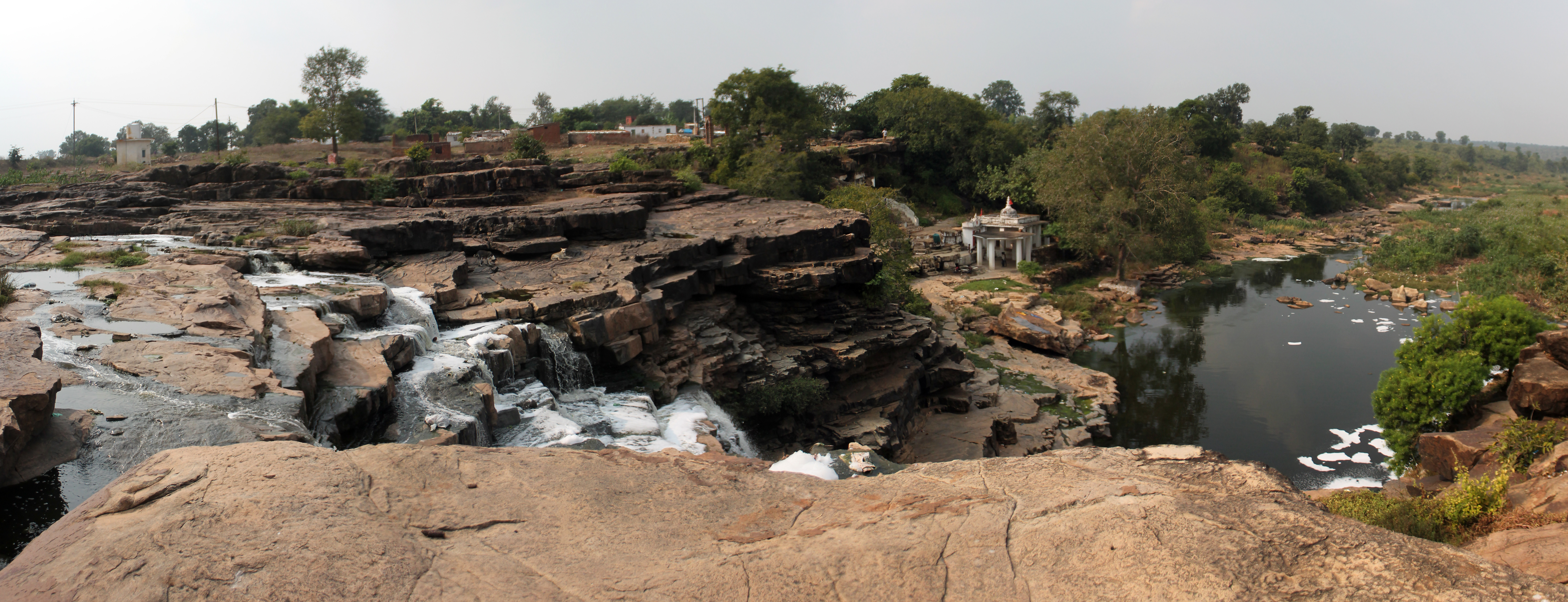
Panoramic view of waterfall on Panna Bypass.

== Diamond mining ==
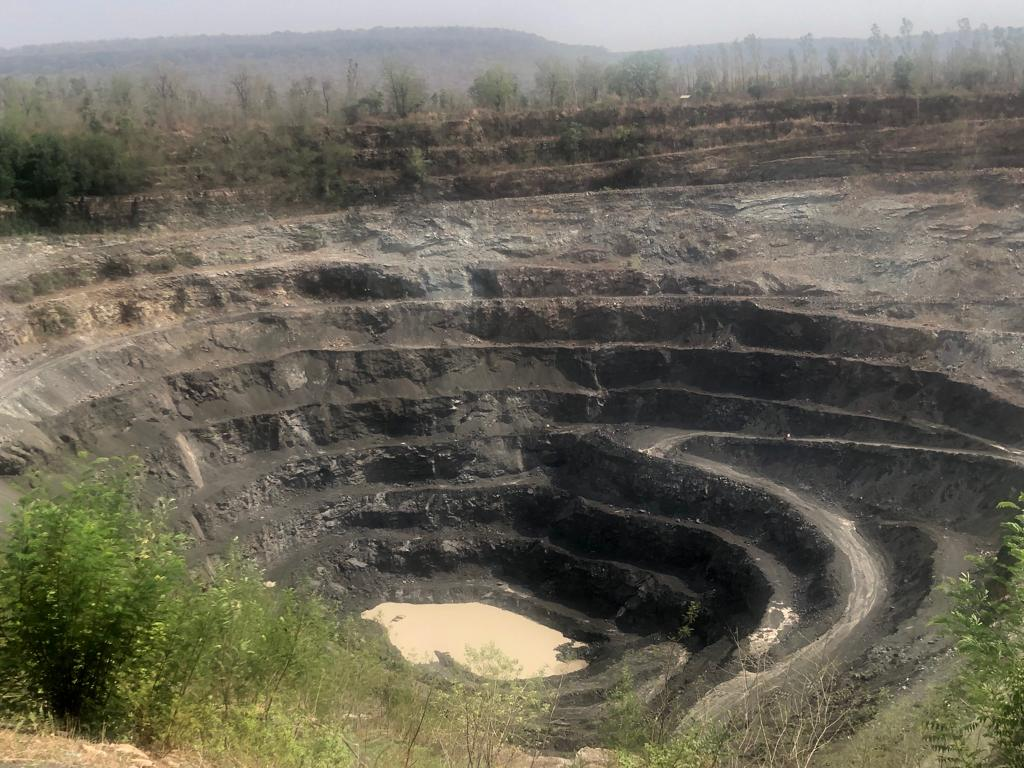
Majhgawan Diamond Mine's Panna

A large group of diamond deposits extends North-East on a branch of the Vindhya Range for 240 kilometres (150 mi) or so, and is known as the Panna group. They do not cover an area of more than 20 acres (81,000 m^{2}). Great pits, 25 feet (7.6 m) in diameter and, perhaps, 30 feet (9.1 m) in depth, are dug for the sake of reaching the diamond conglomerate, which, in many cases, was only a very thin layer. According to Valentine Ball, who edited the 1676 'Travels in India' of Jean-Baptiste Tavernier, Tieffenthaler was the first European to visit the mines in 1765 and claimed that the Panna diamonds could not compare in hardness and fire with other locations in India. No really large diamonds have come from this area. The most productive mines were in the 1860s and were found in Sakaria, around 32 kilometres (20 mi) from Panna. Four classifications were given to the Panna diamonds: first, Motichul, clear and brilliant; 2nd, Manik, with a faint orange tint; 3rd, Panna, verging in tint towards green; 4th, Bunsput, sepia coloured. Mines is situated in the interior of Panna district. Diamond mines in Panna are managed under the Diamond Mining Project of National Mineral Development Corporation (NMDC Ltd), a Public Sector Undertaking (PSU) owned by the Government of India. In other mines the land is leased to prospective miners every year by the government agency. The diamonds unearthed are all collected by the district magistrate of Panna and are auctioned in the month of January. Auctions are open to the public and require a Rs. 5000 deposit. Upwards of 100 diamonds of different carat and shade are offered for auction.

== Panna State ==
- Bundela Rajput Raja Chhatrasal (4 May 1649 – 20 December 1731)
- Raja Harde Sah (1731–1739)
- Raja Sabha Singh (1739–1752)
- Raja Aman Singh (1752–1758)
- Raja Hindupat Singh (1758–1778)
- Raja Anirudh Singh (1778–1779)
- interregnum (1779–1785)
- Raja Dhokal Singh (1785–1798)
- Raja Kishor Singh (1798–1834)
- Raja Harbans Rai (1834–1849)
- Maharaja Mahendra Nirpat Singh (1849–1870)
- Maharaja Rudra Pratap Singh (1870–1893) born 1848.
- Maharaja Mahendra Lokpal Singh (1893–1898)
- Maharaja Mahendra Madho Singh (1898–1902)
- Maharaja Mahendra Yadvendra Singh (1902-1 January 1950)

== Geography ==
Panna is located at 24.72°N 80.2°E. It has an average elevation of 406 metres (1332 ft).

== Climate ==
Panna has humid subtropical climate (Köppen climate classification Cwa) with hot summers, a somewhat cooler monsoon season and cool winters. Heavy rainfall occurs in the monsoon season from June to September.

Climate data for Panna (1981–2010, extremes 1970–2007)
Month	Jan	Feb	Mar	Apr	May	Jun	Jul	Aug	Sep	Oct	Nov	Dec	Year
Record high °C (°F)	35.0 (95.0)	37.1 (98.8)	40.2 (104.4)	46.8 (116.2)	46.2 (115.2)	47.0 (116.6)	42.8 (109.0)	38.8 (101.8)	37.6 (99.7)	36.9 (98.4)	34.5 (94.1)	32.0 (89.6)	47.0 (116.6)
Mean daily maximum °C (°F)	23.0 (73.4)	25.8 (78.4)	31.5 (88.7)	37.3 (99.1)	40.8 (105.4)	38.5 (101.3)	32.3 (90.1)	30.4 (86.7)	30.6 (87.1)	31.0 (87.8)	27.8 (82.0)	24.1 (75.4)	31.1 (88.0)
Mean daily minimum °C (°F)	8.2 (46.8)	9.9 (49.8)	15.5 (59.9)	20.6 (69.1)	25.0 (77.0)	24.6 (76.3)	21.8 (71.2)	20.9 (69.6)	20.4 (68.7)	17.2 (63.0)	12.5 (54.5)	9.4 (48.9)	17.1 (62.8)
Record low °C (°F)	−0.4 (31.3)	2.2 (36.0)	2.2 (36.0)	11.6 (52.9)	14.3 (57.7)	13.0 (55.4)	13.5 (56.3)	10.0 (50.0)	14.5 (58.1)	9.6 (49.3)	3.3 (37.9)	2.6 (36.7)	−0.4 (31.3)
Average rainfall mm (inches)	17.3 (0.68)	18.2 (0.72)	13.7 (0.54)	7.0 (0.28)	7.9 (0.31)	126.5 (4.98)	358.1 (14.10)	382.9 (15.07)	264.8 (10.43)	33.6 (1.32)	4.3 (0.17)	3.7 (0.15)	1,238.1 (48.74)
Average rainy days	1.3	1.4	1.4	1.0	0.6	6.2	13.4	15.0	9.5	1.7	0.5	0.7	52.8
Average relative humidity (%) (at 17:30 IST)	55	46	36	25	27	46	73	81	76	59	53	55	52
Source: India Meteorological Department

== Transport ==
Panna Airport is currently non-operational, the nearest functional airport is Khajuraho Airport. Nearest rail head is Satna 75 km away, Khajuraho 45 km away. Bus service is available to all parts of Madhya Pradesh and some cities of other states like New Delhi, Faridabad, Agra, Kanpur, Jhansi, Gwalior, Nagpur, Allahabad. For Indore, Gwalior, Jabalpur and Bhopal sleeper/luxury/AC buses are available.

== Demographics ==
As of the 2011 Census of India, In 2011, Panna had population of 59,091. Panna has an average adult literacy rate of 64.79%, lower than the national average of 74.04%: male literacy is 74.14%, and female literacy is 54..44%. In Panna, 16.10% of the population is under 6 years of age.

== Education ==
=== Colleges ===
Sr. No	College Name	Address	Specialization	Category
1	Chhatrasal Govt P G College,	Near Bus Stand Panna	All	Public
2	Govt. Polytechnic College,	Hospital Road, Panna (M.P.)		Public
3	Govt. Girls College Panna	Bada Bazar Panna		Public
4	Maharaja Agrasen Mahavidyalaya	Janakpur Road Panna, Dist. Panna (M.P.)		Private
5	Maharishi Mahvidyalaya	Janakpur Road Panna, Dist. Panna (M.P.)	B. Ed	Private
6	S.V.N. College Manour Panna	Manour NMDC Road, Panna (M.P.)	B. Ed	Private
7	Swami Vivekanand Mahvidyalaya	Janakpur, Panna Dist. Panna (MP)		Private
8	Madhav Paramedical College	Jankapur, Panna, Dist. Panna (MP)		Private

=== Schools ===
Sr. No	School name	Medium	Level	Category	Recognised Board	
1	Kendriya Vidyalaya Panna (Govt.)	English	Intermediate	Public	CBSE	
2	Jawahar Navodaya Vidyalaya (Govt.)	English	Intermediate	Public	CBSE	
3					CBSE	
4	D.A.V. Public School, Majhgawan Panna	English	Intermediate	Private	CBSE	
5	Maharashi Vidya Mandir, Janakpur				CBSE	
7	Maharani Durga Rajya Lakshmi High School, Gandhi Chauk	Hindi/English	Intermediate	Private	CBSE	MPBSE
8	Govt Excellence School, Indrapuri colony (Govt.)	Hindi	Intermediate	Public		MPBSE
9	Saraswati Sishu Mandir, Ajay Garh Chauraha	Hindi		Private		MPBSE
10	Lisieux Anand School, Mohan Nivas	English	Intermediate	Private		MPBSE
11	Royal Public Higher Secondary School	English	Intermediate	Private		MPBSE
12	Shri Aurobindo Higher Secondary School	Hindi/English	Intermediate	Private		MPBSE
13	Mykinderland Public School, Ajaygarh Chauraha	English	Middle	Private	N/A	MPBSE
14	Dimond Public School, Near Chitragupta Mandir	Hindi / English	Middle	Private	N/A	
15	Eurokids Pre-International School, Bada Bazar	English	Primary	Private	N/A	
16	Bachpan se Pachpan, Ganesh Market	English	Primary	Private	N/A	
17	Kidzee	English	Primary	Private	N/A	
18	Royal Kids, Near Hospital	English	Primary	Private	N/A	
19	SJS Public School, Purushottampur	English	Primary	Private	N/A	

== People from Panna ==
- Rishikesh Pandey - music director, rapper and filmmaker in Bollywood.
- Faizanuddin - former judge of the Supreme Court of India.
- Ishtiyak Khan - Actor

== See also ==
- Panna National Park
- www.pannalive.com/
- District Panna
