= Maharajpur, Madhya Pradesh Assembly constituency =

Constituency of the Madhya Pradesh legislative assembly in India

Coordinates: 23.28°N 79.05°E

Maharajpur
- Constituency No. 48 for the Madhya Pradesh Legislative Assembly

Constituency details
- Country: India
- Region: Central India
- State: Madhya Pradesh
- District: Chhatarpur
- Lok Sabha constituency: Tikamgarh
- Established: 1961
- Reservation: None

Member of Legislative Assembly
- 16th Madhya Pradesh Legislative Assembly
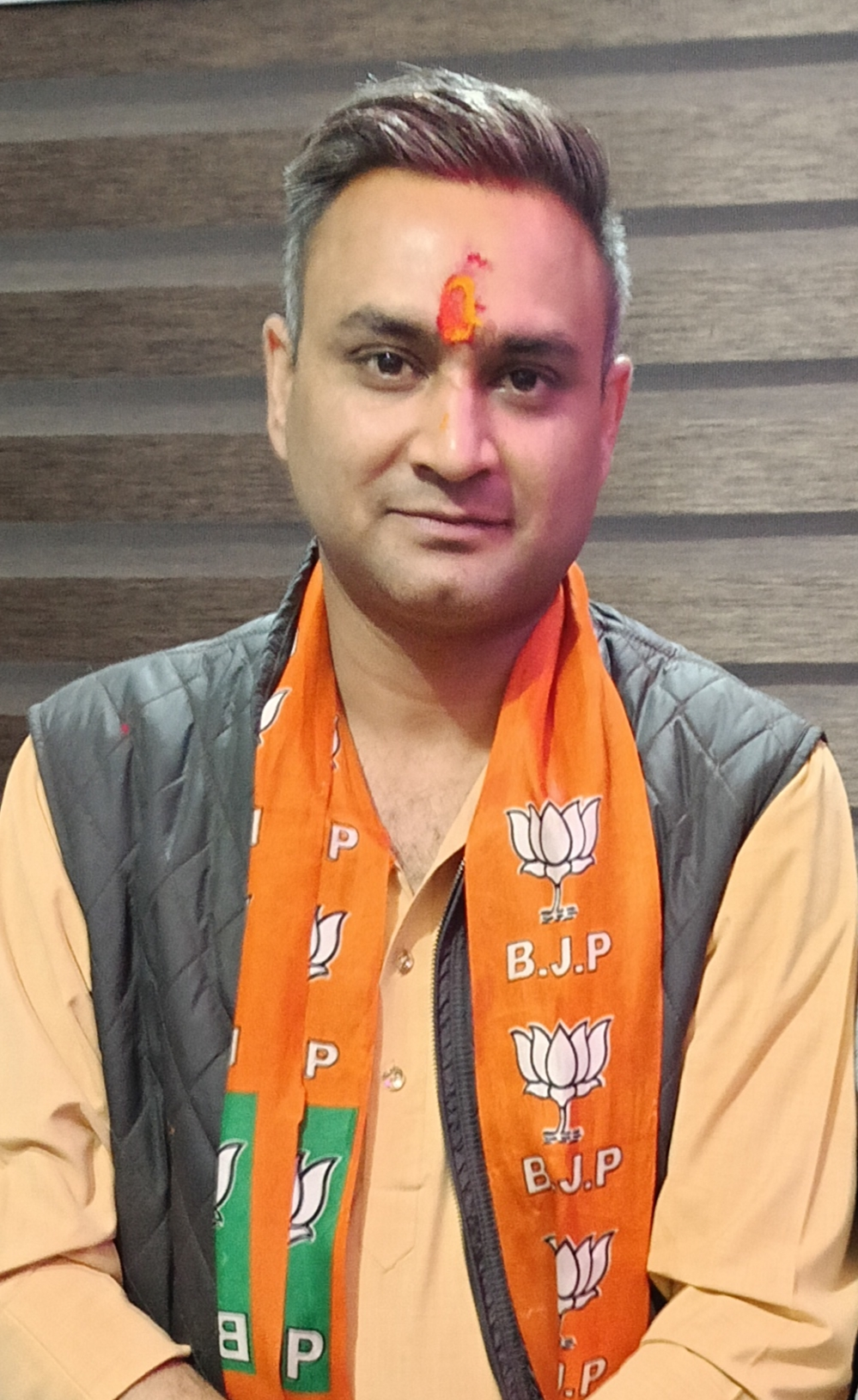
- Incumbent Kamakhya Pratap Singh
- Party: Bharatiya Janata Party
- Elected year: 2023
- Preceded by: Neeraj Vinod Dixit

Maharajpur Assembly constituency is one of the 230 Vidhan Sabha (Legislative Assembly) constituencies of Madhya Pradesh state in central India. This constituency came into existence in 1961, following the delimitation of the Legislative Assembly constituencies and it was reserved for the candidates belonging to the scheduled castes from 1961 to 2008.

== Overview ==
Maharajpur (constituency number 48) is one of the 6 Vidhan Sabha constituencies located in Chhatarpur district. This constituency covers the entire Nowgaon tehsil of the district.

Maharajpur is part of Tikamgarh Lok Sabha constituency along with seven other Vidhan Sabha segments, namely, Chhatarpur and Bijawar in this district and Jatara, Prithvipur, Niwari, Tikamgarh and Khargapur in Tikamgarh district.

== Members of Legislative Assembly ==
| Year | Member | Party |
|---|---|---|
| 1962 | Nathu Ram | Bharatiya Jana Sangh |
| 1967 | Laxman Das Ahirwar | Indian National Congress |
| 1972 | Nathu Ram | Bharatiya Jana Sangh |
| 1977 | Ram Dayal Ahirwar | Janata Party |
| 1980 | Laxman Das Ahirwar | Indian National Congress (Indira) |
| 1985 | Babu Lal Ahirwar | Indian National Congress |
| 1990 | Ram Dayal Ahirwar | Bharatiya Janata Party |
| 1993 | Ram Dayal Ahirwar | Bharatiya Janata Party |
| 1998 | Ram Dayal Ahirwar | Bharatiya Janata Party |
| 2003 | Ram Dayal Ahirwar | Bharatiya Janata Party |
| 2008 | Manavendra Singh | Independent politician |
| 2013 | Manavendra Singh | Bharatiya Janata Party |
| 2018 | Neeraj Vinod Dixit | Indian National Congress |
| 2023 | Kamakhya Pratap Singh | Bharatiya Janata Party |

== Election results ==
=== 2023 ===
2023 Madhya Pradesh Legislative Assembly election: Maharajpur
| Party | Candidate | Votes | % | ±% |
|---|---|---|---|---|
| BJP | Kamakhya Pratap Singh | 76,969 | 44.84 | +18.06 |
| INC | Neeraj Vinod Dixit | 50,352 | 29.33 | −7.2 |
| BSP | Mahesh Chand Kushwaha | 19,812 | 11.54 | −7.89 |
| SP | Ajay Daulat Tiwari | 11,828 | 6.89 | +3.1 |
| AAP | K. R. Patel (Ramji Bhaiya) | 6,469 | 3.77 | +3.35 |
| NOTA | None of the above | 1,679 | 0.98 | +0.15 |
| Majority | | 26,617 | 15.51 | +5.76 |
| Turnout | | 171,653 | 72.81 | +5.32 |
| BJP gain from INC | | Swing | | |

=== 2018 ===
2018 Madhya Pradesh Legislative Assembly election: Maharajpur
| Party | Candidate | Votes | % | ±% |
|---|---|---|---|---|
| INC | Neeraj Vinod Dixit | 52,461 | 36.53 | |
| BJP | Manavendra Singh | 38,456 | 26.78 | |
| BSP | Rajesh Mahton | 27,902 | 19.43 | |
| RSMD | Mahesh Matoul | 9,505 | 6.62 | |
| SP | Aheer Preetam Bhumman Yadav | 5,440 | 3.79 | |
| Independent | Eng. Pankaj Ahirwar | 1,771 | 1.23 | |
| NOTA | None of the above | 1,191 | 0.83 | |
| Majority | | 14,005 | 9.75 | |
| Turnout | | 143,613 | 67.49 | |
| INC gain from BJP | | Swing | | |

== See also ==
- Maharajpur
- Nowgaon
