= Bijawar Assembly constituency =

Assembly constituency in Madhya Pradesh

Coordinates: 24.63°N 79.50°E

Bijawar
- Constituency No. 52 for the Madhya Pradesh Legislative Assembly

Constituency details
- Country: India
- Region: Central India
- State: Madhya Pradesh
- District: Chhatarpur
- Lok Sabha constituency: Tikamgarh
- Established: 1951
- Reservation: None

Member of Legislative Assembly
- 16th Madhya Pradesh Legislative Assembly
- Incumbent Rajesh Shukla
- Party: Bharatiya Janata Party
- Elected year: 2023
- Preceded by: Pushpendra Nath Pathak

Bijawar Assembly constituency is one of the 230 Vidhan Sabha (Legislative Assembly) constituencies of Madhya Pradesh state in central India. This constituency came into existence in 1951, as one of the 48 Vidhan Sabha constituencies of the erstwhile Vindhya Pradesh state.

== Overview ==
Bijawar (constituency number 52) is one of the 6 Vidhan Sabha constituencies located in Chhatarpur district. This constituency covers the Satai and Bijawar nagar panchayats and parts of Chhatarpur, Bijawar and Rajnagar tehsils of the district.

Bijawar is part of Tikamgarh Lok Sabha constituency along with seven other Vidhan Sabha segments, namely, Maharajpur and Chhatarpur in this district and Jatara, Prithvipur, Niwari, Tikamgarh and Khargapur in Tikamgarh district.

== Members of Legislative Assembly ==
=== Vindhya Pradesh Legislative Assembly ===
Election	Name	Party
1951	Diwan Pratap Singh	Indian National Congress
1951	Pyare Lal	Indian National Congress

=== Madhya Pradesh Legislative Assembly ===
Election	Name	Party
1957	Gayatri Devi	Indian National Congress
1957	Hansraj	Indian National Congress
1962	Govind Singh Judev	Independent politician
1967	K. Nath	Indian National Congress
1972	Yadvendra Singh	Bharatiya Jana Sangh
1977	Mukund Sakharam	Janata Party
1980	Yadvendra Singh	Indian National Congress (Indira)
1985	Jujhar Singh Bundela	Bharatiya Janata Party
1990	Jujhar Singh Bundela	Bharatiya Janata Party
1993	Manvendra Singh	Indian National Congress
1998	Manvendra Singh	Indian National Congress
2003	Jitendra Singh Bundela	Bharatiya Janata Party
2008	Asharani	Bharatiya Janata Party
2013	Pushpendra Nath Pathak	Bharatiya Janata Party
2018	Rajesh Shukla	Samajwadi Party
2023	Rajesh Shukla	Bharatiya Janata Party

== Election results ==
=== 2023 ===
2023 Madhya Pradesh Legislative Assembly election: Bijawar
Party	Candidate	Votes	%	±%
BJP	Rajesh Shukla	88,223	52.59	▲31.21
INC	Charan Singh Yadav	55,761	33.24	▲16.83
BSP	Mahendra Kumar Gupta	10,443	6.23	▼0.22
AAP	Amit Bhatnagar	4,185	2.49	▲1.15
ASP(KR)	Chetram Ahirwar	1,885	1.12	
NOTA	None of the above	1,433	0.85	▲0.39
Majority		32,462	19.35	▼6.05
Turnout		167,743	72.67	▲2.47
BJP gain from SP		Swing		

=== 2018 ===
2018 Madhya Pradesh Legislative Assembly election: Bijawar
Party	Candidate	Votes	%	±%
SP	Rajesh Shukla	67,623	46.78	
BJP	Pushpendra Nath Pathak	30,909	21.38	
INC	Shankar Pratap Singh	23,726	16.41	
BSP	Anupama Yadav	9,318	6.45	
AAP	Amit Bhatnagar	1,943	1.34	
Independent	Deepak Bhaiya	1,902	1.32	
NOTA	None of the above	663	0.46	
Majority		36,714	25.4	
Turnout		144,543	70.2	
SP gain from BJP		Swing		

== See also ==
- Bijawar
- Satai
