= Khargapur Assembly constituency =

Constituency of the Madhya Pradesh legislative assembly in India

Coordinates: 24.82°N 79.14°E

Khargapur
- Constituency No. 47 for the Madhya Pradesh Legislative Assembly

Constituency details
- Country: India
- Region: Central India
- State: Madhya Pradesh
- District: Tikamgarh
- Lok Sabha constituency: Tikamgarh
- Established: 1967
- Reservation: None

Member of Legislative Assembly
- 16th Madhya Pradesh Legislative Assembly
- Incumbent Chanda Singh Gaur
- Party: Indian National Congress
- Elected year: 2023
- Preceded by: Rahul Singh Lodhi

Khargapur Assembly constituency is one of the 230 Vidhan Sabha (Legislative Assembly) constituencies of Madhya Pradesh state in central India. This constituency came into existence in 1967, following the delimitation of the Legislative Assembly constituencies and it was reserved for the candidates belonging to the scheduled castes from 1967 to 2008.

== Overview ==
Khargapur (constituency number 47) is one of the 5 Vidhan Sabha constituencies located in Tikamgarh district. This constituency covers the entire Baldeogarh tehsil, Palera nagar panchayat and part of Palera tehsil of the district.

Khargapur is part of Tikamgarh Lok Sabha constituency along with seven other Vidhan Sabha segments, namely, Jatara, Prithvipur, Niwari and Tikamgarh in this district and Maharajpur, Chhatarpur and Bijawar in Chhatarpur district.

== Members of Legislative Assembly ==
Year	Member	Party
1967	R. Ram	Indian National Congress
1972	Baiju Ahirwar	Indian National Congress
1977	Nathu Ram Ahirwar	Janata Party
1980	Nathu Ram Ahirwar	Indian National Congress (Indira)
1985	Vrindavan Ahirwar	Indian National Congress
1990	Anandi Lal	Bharatiya Janata Party
1993	Parvat Lal Ahirwar	Bharatiya Janata Party
1998	Parvat Lal Ahirwar	Bharatiya Janata Party
2003	Harishankar Khatik	Bharatiya Janata Party
2008	Ajay Yadav	Bharatiya Janshakti Party
2013	Chanda Singh Gaur	Indian National Congress
2018	Rahul Singh Lodhi	Bharatiya Janata Party
2023	Chanda Singh Gaur	Indian National Congress

== Election results ==
=== 2023 ===
2023 Madhya Pradesh Legislative Assembly election: Khargapur
Party	Candidate	Votes	%	±%
INC	Chanda Singh Gaur	83,739	44.32	+12.13
BJP	Rahul Singh Lodhi	75,622	40.03	+0.54
AAP	Pyare Lal Soni	12,174	6.44	+6.25
BSP	Shikha Hradesh Kushwaha	8,559	4.53	−5.09
NOTA	None of the above	2,236	1.18	+0.5
Majority		8,117	4.29	−3.01
Turnout		188,932	75.61	+2.46
INC gain from BJP		Swing		

=== 2018 ===
2018 Madhya Pradesh Legislative Assembly election: Khargapur
Party	Candidate	Votes	%	±%
BJP	Rahul Singh Lodhi	63,066	39.49	
INC	Chanda Singh Gour	51,401	32.19	
BSP	Ajay Yadav	15,366	9.62	
Independent	Pyare Lal Soni	13,258	8.3	
Sapaks Party	Ashish Raikwar	4,009	2.51	
Bharatiya Prajashakti Party	Pandit Ramkumar Pathak	1,679	1.05	
Independent	Mukesh	1,644	1.03	
NOTA	None of the above	1,092	0.68	
Majority		11,665	7.3	
Turnout		159,701	73.15	
BJP gain from INC		Swing		

=== 2013 ===
2013 Madhya Pradesh Legislative Assembly election: Khargapur
Party	Candidate	Votes	%	±%
INC	Chanda Singh Gaur	59,771	42.32	
BJP	Rahul Singh Lodhi	54094	38.30	
BSP	Anupama Singh Lodhi	12195	8.63	N/A
MD	Kushwaha Chaturbhuj	5666	4.01	
NCP	Deen Mohmmad	1800	1.27	
Independent	Sakeel Khan Rain	1547	1.10	
Independent	Sundar Lal	1252	0.89	
Independent	Mohan	1046	0.74	
RSMD	Devicharan Kushwaha	728	0.52	
Independent	Pawan	599	0.42	
NOTA	None of the Above	2534	1.79	
Majority				
Turnout		141232	68.67	
INC gain from Bharatiya Janshakti Party		Swing		

== See also ==
- Palera
