= 1952 Vindhya Pradesh Legislative Assembly election =

Indian state election

- 26 March 1952

All 60 seats in the Vindhya Pradesh Legislative Assembly 31 seats needed for a majority
- Registered: 2,403,588
- Turnout: 28.37%
	First party	Second party
	INC
Leader	S. N. Shukla
Party	INC	Socialist
Leader's seat	Amarpur
Seats won	40	11
Popular vote	2,70,013	1,28,187
Percentage	39.60%	18.80%
Elected Chief Minister of Vindhya Pradesh
S. N. Shukla
INC

Indian administrative divisions, as of 1951

Elections to the Legislative Assembly of the Indian state of Vindhya Pradesh were held on March 26, 1952. 252 candidates contested the 48 constituencies in the Assembly. There were 12 two-member constituencies, and 36 single-member constituencies. The Indian National Congress won a majority of seats and Sambhu Nath Shukla became the new Chief Minister.

== Results ==
Summary of results of the 1952 Vindhya Pradesh Legislative Assembly election
Political party	Seats Contested	Won	% of Seats	Votes	Vote %
Indian National Congress	56	40	66.67	2,70,013	39.60
Kisan Mazdoor Praja Party	49	3	5.00	1,10,465	16.2
Socialist Party	46	11	18.33	1,28,187	18.80
Bharatiya Jana Sangh	33	2	3.33	67,330	9.88
Akhil Bharatiya Ram Rajya Parishad	17	2	3.33	30,817	4.52
Independent politician	42	2	3.33	62,102	9.11
Total Seats	60	Voters	24,03,588	Turnout	6,81,799 (28.37%)

== Elected members ==
#	Constituency	Member	Party
1	Pushprajgarh	Ram Prasad Singh	Indian National Congress
1	Pushprajgarh	Dan Bahadur Singh	Indian National Congress
2	Burhar	Saraswati Prasad Patel	Indian National Congress
3	Sohagpur	Lal Rajendra Bahadur Singh	Independent
4	Jaitpur Kotma	Saheb Singh	Indian National Congress
4	Jaitpur Kotma	Padam Chand Patni	Indian National Congress
5	Beohari	Baba Din	Kisan Mazdoor Praja Party
5	Beohari	Ram Kishore	Socialist Party
6	Umariya	Lal Aditya Nath Singh	Indian National Congress
7	Amarpur	Sambhu Nath Shukla	Indian National Congress
8	Singrauli Niwas	Sumitri Devi	Socialist Party
8	Singrauli Niwas	Shyam Kartik	Socialist Party
9	Deosar	Ganga Dhar	Bharatiya Jana Sangh
10	Sidhi Madwas	Chandra Pratap	Socialist Party
10	Sidhi Madwas	Dadhi	Socialist Party
11	Churhat	Jagat Bahadur Singh	Socialist Party
12	Kanpura	Bhai Lal	Socialist Party
13	Hanumana	Bhuneshwar Prasad	Akhil Bharatiya Ram Rajya Parishad
14	Maugani Naigarhi	Someshwar Singh	Independent
14	Maugani Naigarhi	Sahdiya Chamar	Socialist Party
15	Teonthar	Rajeshwar Prasad Misra	Indian National Congress
16	Garhi	Rana Samser Singh	Indian National Congress
17	Semariya	Baikunth Prasad	Indian National Congress
18	Sirmaur	Narmada Prasad Singh	Kisan Mazdoor Praja Party
19	Mangawan	Sriniwas Tiwari	Socialist Party
20	Gurh	Brij Raj Singh	Indian National Congress
21	Rewa	Jagdish Chandra Joshi	Socialist Party
22	Raipur	Shatru Sudan Singh	Indian National Congress
23	Mukundpur	Kesho Prasad	Indian National Congress
24	Ram Nagar	Balwant Singh	Bharatiya Jana Sangh
25	Amarpatan	Lal Bihari Singh	Indian National Congress
26	Rampur Baghelan	Govind Narain Singh	Indian National Congress
27	Sabhapur	Ram Sajiwan Singh	Indian National Congress
28	Satna	Shiva Nand	Indian National Congress
29	Kothi	Kaushalendra Pratap Bahadur Singh	Akhil Bharatiya Ram Rajya Parishad
30	Amdara	Ramadhar Pandey	Indian National Congress
31	Nagod	Gopal Saran Singh	Indian National Congress
31	Nagod	Het Ram	Indian National Congress
32	Pawai	Bhura	Indian National Congress
32	Pawai	Narendra Singh	Indian National Congress
33	Ajaigarh	Lalmohammad	Indian National Congress
34	Panna	Saryu Prasad Chanpuriya	Indian National Congress
35	Chandla	Kamta Prasad	Indian National Congress
36	Laundi	Mahendra Kumar Jain	Indian National Congress
37	Rajnagar	Gokal Prasad	Indian National Congress
38	Chhatarpur	Govinda	Indian National Congress
38	Chhatarpur	Panna Lal	Indian National Congress
39	Bijawar	Diwan Pratap Singh	Indian National Congress
39	Bijawar	Piyare Lal	Indian National Congress
40	Malhera	Basant Lal	Indian National Congress
41	Tikamgarh	Krishna Kant	Kisan Mazdoor Praja Party
41	Tikamgarh	Rilli Chamar	Socialist Party
42	Chandpura	Thakur Das Mishra	Indian National Congress
43	Jatara	Narain Das	Indian National Congress
44	Lidhaura	Raghuraj Singh	Indian National Congress
45	Niwari	Lala Ram Bajpai	Indian National Congress
46	Prithvipur	Shyam Lal	Indian National Congress
47	Seondha	Ram Das	Indian National Congress
47	Seondha	Laxmi Narain	Indian National Congress
48	Datia	Shyam Sunder Das	Indian National Congress

== State Reorganization and Merger ==
On 1 November 1956, Vindhya Pradesh was merged into Madhya Pradesh under States Reorganisation Act, 1956.

== See also ==
- Vindhya Pradesh
- 1951–52 elections in India
- 1952 Bhopal Legislative Assembly election
- 1952 Madhya Bharat Legislative Assembly election
- 1952 Madhya Pradesh Legislative Assembly election
- 1957 Madhya Pradesh Legislative Assembly election
