= Jatara Assembly constituency =

Assembly constituency in Madhya Pradesh

Coordinates: 25.00°N 79.06°E

Jatara
- Constituency No. 44 for the Madhya Pradesh Legislative Assembly

Constituency details
- Country: India
- Region: Central India
- State: Madhya Pradesh
- District: Tikamgarh
- Lok Sabha constituency: Tikamgarh
- Established: 1951
- Reservation: SC

Member of Legislative Assembly
- 16th Madhya Pradesh Legislative Assembly
- Incumbent Harishankar Khatik
- Party: Bharatiya Janata Party
- Elected year: 2023
- Preceded by: Dinesh Kumar Ahirwar

Jatara is one of the 230 Vidhan Sabha (Legislative Assembly) constituencies of Madhya Pradesh state in central India. This constituency is reserved for the candidates belonging to the Scheduled castes since 2008, following the delimitation of the legislative assembly constituencies. It came into existence in 1951, as one of the 48 Vidhan Sabha constituencies of the erstwhile Vindhya Pradesh state.

== Overview ==
Jatara (constituency number 44) is one of the 3 Vidhan Sabha constituencies located in Tikamgarh district. This constituency covers the Jatara and Lidhorakhas nagar panchayats and parts of Jatara and Palera tehsils of the district.

Jatara is part of Tikamgarh Lok Sabha constituency along with seven other Vidhan Sabha segments, namely, Tikamgarh, Prithvipur, Niwari and Khargapur in this district and Maharajpur, Chhatarpur and Bijawar in Chhatarpur district.

== Members of the Legislative Assembly ==
=== Vindhya Pradesh Legislative Assembly ===
Election	Name	Party
1952	Narayan Das	Indian National Congress

=== Madhya Pradesh Legislative Assembly ===
Election	Name	Party
1957	Kamta Prasad	Indian National Congress
1962	Narendra Singh Dev	Independent
1967	Narendra Singh Dev	Indian National Congress
1977	Akhand Pratap Singh Yadav	Janata Party
1980	Swami Prasad Pastor	Independent
1985	Thakurdas Yadav	Indian National Congress
1990	Surendra Pratap Singh Bundela	Bharatiya Janata Party
1993	Akhand Pratap Singh Yadav	Indian National Congress
1998	Sunil Nayak	Bharatiya Janata Party
2003	Sunil Nayak	Bharatiya Janata Party
2008	Harishankar Khatik	Bharatiya Janata Party
2013	Dinesh Kumar Ahirwar	Indian National Congress
2018	Harishankar Khatik	Bharatiya Janata Party
2023	Harishankar Khatik	Bharatiya Janata Party

== Election results ==
=== 2023 ===
2023 Madhya Pradesh Legislative Assembly election: Jatara
Party	Candidate	Votes	%	±%
BJP	Harishankar Khatik	75,943	45.7	+0.14
INC	Kiran Ahirwar	64,727	38.95	
SP	R. R. Bansal	15,060	9.06	−6.08
BSP	Ahirwar Dharmendra	1,878	1.13	−12.07
NOTA	None of the above	1,077	0.65	−1.07
Majority		11,216	6.75	−19.67
Turnout		166,169	75.3	+3.36
BJP hold		Swing		

=== 2018 ===
2018 Madhya Pradesh Legislative Assembly election: Jatara
Party	Candidate	Votes	%	±%
BJP	Harishankar Khatik	63,315	45.56	
MD	R.R. Bansal	26,600	19.14	
SP	Anita Prabhu Dayal Khatik	21,040	15.14	
BSP	Dwarika Prasad Ahirwar	18,349	13.2	
NOTA	None of the above	2,385	1.72	
Majority		36,715	26.42	
Turnout		138,984	71.94	
BJP gain from INC		Swing		

=== 2013 ===
2013 Madhya Pradesh Legislative Assembly election: Jatara
Party	Candidate	Votes	%	±%
INC	Dinesh Kumar Ahirwar	51,149	39.90	
BJP	Harishankar Khatik	50916	39.72	
MD	Santosh	15516	12.10	
BSP	Anil Ravi	3310	2.58	N/A
ABGP	Dinesh Ahirwar	1289	1.01	
SP	Kewra Devi Khangar	1130	0.88	N/A
Independent	Suresh	938	0.73	
Independent	Satish Ahirwar	934	0.73	
Independent	Duli Chandra Ahirwar	654	0.51	
Independent	Bhagchandra Ahirwar	611	0.48	
NOTA	None of the Above	1755	1.37	
Majority				
Turnout		128202	70.69	
Swing to INC from BJP		Swing		

== See also ==
- Jatara
- Lidhorakhas
