= Pushpendra =

Pushpendra is a masculine given name found in India, specifically in the states of Madhya Pradesh, Rajasthan, and Uttar Pradesh.

Notable people with this name include:

- Pushpendra Kumar Garg (born 1963), an Indian yacht sailer
- Pushpendra Nath Pathak, an Indian state politician from Madhya Pradesh
- Pushpendra Singh (born 1970), an Indian state politician from Rajasthan
- Pushpendra Singh Chandel, an Indian MP
