= Vidyadhara (Chandela ruler) =

Chandela king from 1003 to 1035

Vidyādhara
- Paramabhattaraka Maharajadhiraja Parameshvara

Chandela king
- Reign: c. 1003–1035
- Predecessor: Ganda
- Successor: Vijayapala
- Dynasty: Chandela

Vidyadhara (r. c. 1003-1035) was a Chandela king of central India. He ruled in the Jejakabhukti region (Bundelkhand in present-day Madhya Pradesh). Vidyadhara was the successor of Ganda, and expanded the Chandela power between Chambal river in the northwest and Narmada River in south.

== Ascension ==
Until the 1970s, scholars such as R. K. Dikshit assigned the beginning of Vidyadhara's reign to 1018 CE. However, later, a copper-plate issued by Vidyadhara's queen Satyabhama was discovered at Kundeshwar. This inscription is dated 1004 CE, which proves that Vidyadhara was already ruling in 1004 CE. Based on this, scholar S. K. Sullerey dates Vidyadhara's reign as 1003-1035 CE.

== Invasion of Kannauj ==
In 1018, the Ghaznavid king Mahmud of Ghazni invaded Kannauj, whose Pratihara king (possibly Rajyapala) fled the city, allowing the Ghaznvids to sack it without facing much resistance. According to the 12th century Muslim historian Ali ibn al-Athir, Bida, the king of Khajuraho killed the king of Kannauj as a punishment for this cowardice. Bida is believed to be a variant of "Vidya" (that is, Vidyadhara). Some later Muslim historians misread this name as "Nanda", based on which British-era scholars identified the killer of the Kannauj king as Vidyadhara's predecessor Ganda. However, an inscription discovered at Mahoba confirms that it was Vidyadhara who defeated the ruler of Kannauj. The Dubkund inscription of Arjuna of Kachchhapaghata family claims that Arjuna killed Rajyapala in a great battle. The Kachchhapaghatas were feudatories of the Chandelas, so it appears that Arjuna was acting as an agent of Vidyadhara.

== Struggle against the Ghaznavids ==
It is possible that Vidyadhara appointed Rajyapala's successor Trilochanapala on the Pratihara throne. In 1019, Mahmud launched a fresh invasion of India, and defeated the Kabul Shahi ruler Trilochanapala (not to be confused with the Pratihara ruler of same name). He then advanced towards Bari, the new Pratihara capital. According to Abu Sa'id Gardezi's Zayn al-Akhbar, the Pratihara ruler Trilochanapala fled from the town. After sacking Bari, Mahmud encountered the army of Vidyadhara (variously named "Bida" or "Nanda" in Muslim chronicles).

According to Nizamuddin Ahmad's Tabaqat-i-Akbari, the two armies were encamped on the opposite banks of a river. Mahmud sent an envoy to Vidyadhara (called "Nanda" by Ahmad), asking him to accept Islam and Mahmud's suzerainty. Vidyadhara refused to make a submission. After seeing the Chandela ruler's vast army from an elevated spot, Mahmud became worried. However, at night, Vidyadhara withdrew with some of his companions, leaving behind his army. According to this account, there was no fight between the two armies. After Vidyadhara's withdrawal, Mahmud's army sacked his camp, and procured a great amount of wealth, including 580 elephants. Gardezi, in his Zayn al-Akhbar, states that the Chandela ruler (called "Ganda" in this account) had already deserted his camp by the time Mahmud's envoy reached there. Ali ibn al-Athir offers a different account, stating that the two armies fought a battle before retreating at the nightfall.

In 1022, Mahmud invaded the Chandela kingdom again, besieging the Gwalior Fort (Gopadri), which was controlled by a Kachchhapaghata feudatory of Vidyadhara. This feudatory is identified with Kirtiraja. According to Tabaqat-i-Akbari Mahmud lifted the siege after four days, in return for a tribute of 35 elephants. He then proceeded to besiege the Chandela fortress of Kalanjara. After a long siege, the Kalanjara ruler (called "Nanda" in this account), offered Mahmud a tribute of 300 elephants and "begged for safety". According to Firishta's account, the Chandela king intoxicated the elephants and sent them to Mahmud's camp without any riders. These wild elephants were tamed by Mahmud's Tatar soldiers. The Chandela king, on seeing this act of bravery, sent a panegyric praising Mahmud and his army. In return, Mahmud also complimented the Vidyadhara, and awarded him 15 fortresses and other presents before turning to his capital Ghazna.

S. K. Mitra theorizes that the encounter between Vidyadhara and Mahmud ended with an "exchange of gifts", which must have been depicted as "tribute" by the Muslim historians.

== Possible conflict with Bhoja ==
An inscription of Kirtiraja, the Kachchhapaghata ruler of Gwalior, claims that he defeated the forces of the Malwa ruler. At that time, Malwa was ruled by the powerful Paramara king Bhoja. It is unlikely that Kirtiraja could have defeated him alone. Thus, S. K. Mitra theorizes that Kirtiraja must have received help from his overlord Vidyadhara in this campaign. One possibility is that Bhoja invaded the Chandela kingdom, but was forced to retreat by Kirtiraja. The fragmentary Mahoba inscription of the Chandelas states that Bhoja and Kalachuri-Chandra, like scared pupils, worshipped Vidhyadhara, a master of warfare. Kalachuri-Chandra (literally "Moon of the Kalachuris") is identified with the Kalachuri king Gangeya-deva. According to one theory, Bhoja, aided by Gangeya, invaded the Chandela kingdom, but Vidyadhara forced them to retreat. However, some scholars such as K. M. Munshi believe that the Mahoba inscription is merely a boastful exaggeration.

== Cultural contributions ==
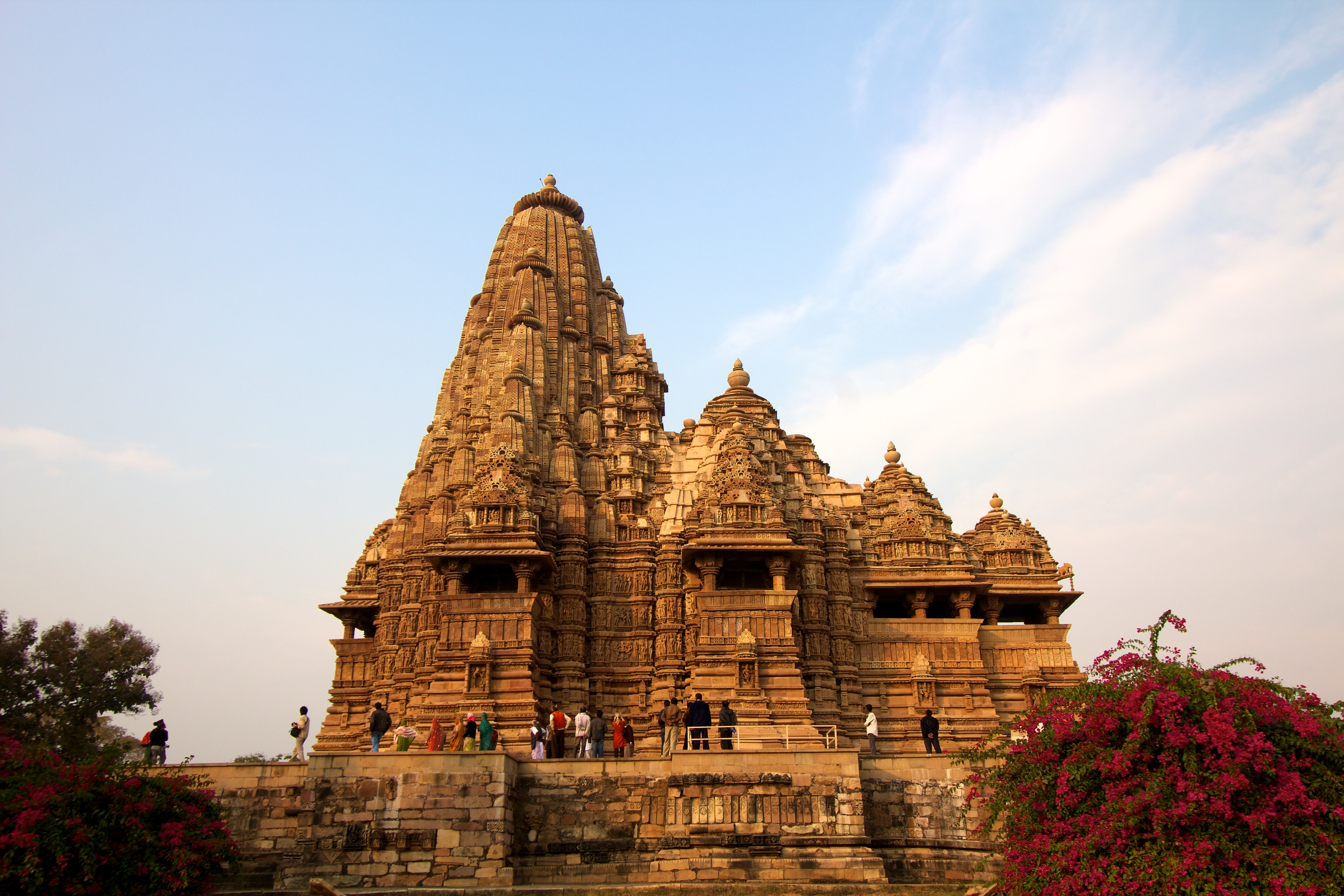
Kandariya Mahadeva Temple, commissioned by Vidyadhara

Vidyadhara commissioned the Kandariya Mahadeva Temple at Khajuraho. Epigraphic inscriptions on a pilaster of the mandapa in the temple mentions a king called "Virimda", which is interpreted as another name of Vidhyadhara.
