= Ardhamandapa =

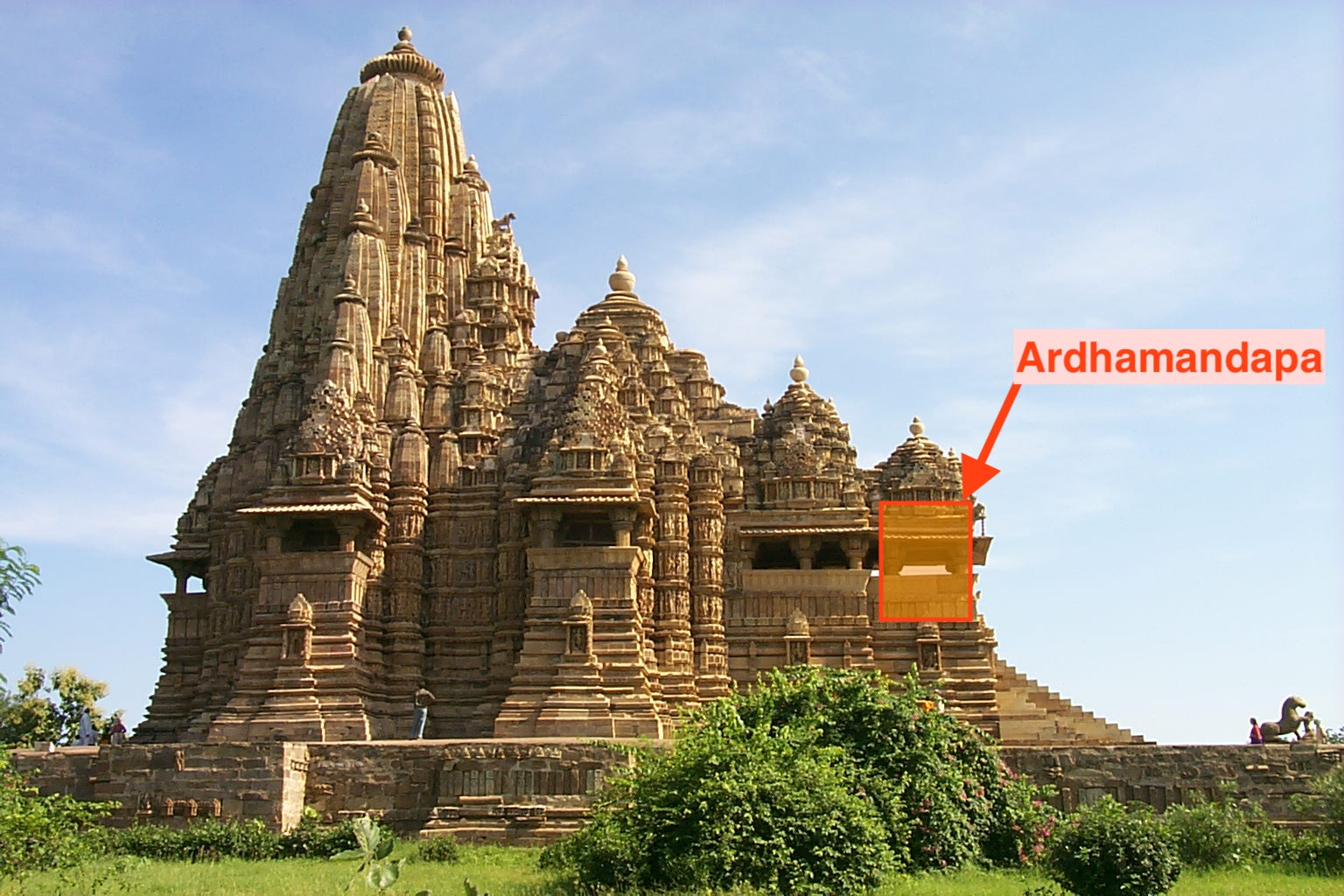
Ardhamandapa of the Khajuraho Kandariya Mahadeva Temple

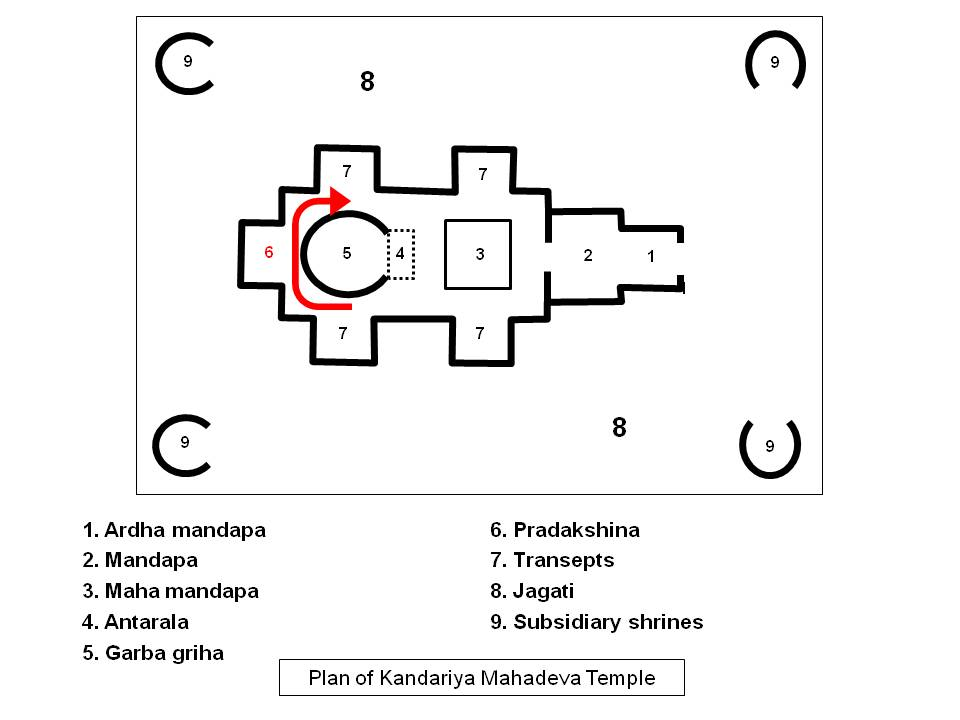
Plan of Kandariya Mahadeva temple

In Hindu temple architecture, Ardhamandapa (lit. half-open hall), also spelled artha mandapam or ardh mandapam, is an important element of the entrance group. It is an entrance porch forming a transitional area between the outside and a mandapa of the temple.

== Overview ==
Ardhamandapa is usually an open—to provide light and air—four-pillared pavilion in front of the entrance door of mandapa of the temple. If the temple mandapa has three entrance doors, there have to be three such porches, one on each side. Ardhamandapas usually resemble mandapas in design and carving. Most Hindu, Jain, and Buddhist temples feature various transitional spaces between the central shrine (garbhagriha) and the outside world, but only the largest, most developed temples offer the full set of these elements: ardhamandapa, mandapa, and mahamandapa, with the first being the lowest.
