= Nitendra Singh Rathore =

Indian politician

Member of Madhya Pradesh Legislative Assembly
- Incumbent
- Assumed office 2023
- Preceded by: Shishupal Yadav
- Constituency: Prithvipur

Personal details
- Party: Indian National Congress
- Profession: Politician

Nitendra Brajendra Singh Rathore is an Indian politician from Madhya Pradesh. He is a Member of the Madhya Pradesh Legislative Assembly from 2023, representing Prithvipur Assembly constituency as a Member of the Indian National Congress.

== Political career ==
On 2 May 2021, following the death of Brajendra Singh Rathore, the sitting five-term MLA of the Prithvipur constituency and a Madhya Pradesh minister, a by-election was held to fill the vacant seat. This marked Nitendra Singh Rathore's political debut. He contested the election as a candidate from the Indian National Congress, facing Bharatiya Janata Party candidate Shishupal Yadav. Yadav won the election by a margin of 15,687 votes, securing a total of 82,673 votes, while Rathore received 66,986 votes.

In the 2023 Madhya Pradesh Legislative Assembly election, Rathore and Yadav once again contested against each other, representing the same political parties. This time, Rathore emerged victorious, winning by a narrow margin of 1,831 votes. Rathore garnered 85,739 votes, while Yadav received 83,908 votes.

== See also ==
- 2023 Madhya Pradesh Legislative Assembly election
- Madhya Pradesh Legislative Assembly
