= Ganda (Chandela dynasty) =

Chandela king from 999 to 1002

Chandela king
- Reign: c. 999–1002
- Predecessor: Dhanga
- Successor: Vidyadhara
- Dynasty: Chandela

Ganda (IAST: Gaṇḍa) was an early 11th century king of the Chandela dynasty of India. He ruled in the Jejakabhukti region (Bundelkhand in present-day Madhya Pradesh). The exact period of his reign is uncertain, but has been dated approximately as 999-1002 CE.

== Sources of information ==
No inscriptions issued by Ganda are available, but his name (as Ganda-deva) appears in the following inscriptions issued by his successors:

- Mahoba stone inscription composed of Paramardideva
- Mau stone inscription of Madanavarman
- Ajaygadh rock inscription of Kirttivarman
- Ajaygadh rock inscription issued during the reign of Bhojavarman

The information about Ganda in these inscriptions is not of much historical value. They mostly contain eulogistic descriptions, such as calling him invincible, or stating that he had "the sole lordship of the earth".

== Career ==
Ganda succeeded Dhanga as the Chandela king. An analysis of the information available about Ganda's successor Vidyadhara suggests that Ganda managed to maintain the territory he inherited. According to the Mau stone inscription, Dhanga's chief minister Prabhasa retained the position during the reign of his successor Ganda. The Ajaygadh inscriptions suggest that a Kayastha named Jajuka was another important official of Ganda.

Until the 1970s, scholars such as R. K. Dikshit assigned the end of Ganda's rule to 1015 CE. However, later, a copper-plate issued by Vidyadhara's queen Satyabhama was discovered at Kundeshwar. This inscription is dated 1004 CE, which proves that Vidyadhara was already ruling in 1004 CE. Based on this, S. K. Sullerey dates the end of Ganda's rule to 1002 CE.

Some earlier historians believed that Ganda ruled until at least 1018 CE. R. K. Dikshit identified Dhanga with the king of Kalanjara who contributed contingents to the Hindu confederacy that was defeated by Mahmud of Ghazni at Peshawar in 1008 CE. In 1018 CE, Mahmud of Ghazni invaded Kannauj, whose king (possibly Rajyapala) fled the city, allowing the Ghaznvid army to sack it without facing much resistance. According to the later Muslim historians such as Firishta (16th century), Nanda, the king of Khajuraho killed the king of Kannauj as a punishment for his cowardice. Some British-era scholars identified "Nanda" as a misspelling of Ganda. Ali ibn al-Athir (12th century), a Muslim historian earlier than Firishta, named the king of Khajuraho as "Bida", a variant of "Vidya" (that is, Ganda's successor Vidyadhara). The later Muslim historians must have misread this as "Nanda". Moreover, an inscription discovered at Mahoba states that Vidyadhara defeated the ruler of Kannauj. Based on this, it can be inferred that Ganda's reign ended sometime before 1018 CE, when his successor defeated the ruler of Kannauj.
