= Rahul Singh Lodhi =

Indian politician (born 1977)

Rahul Bhaiya

Member of the Madhya Pradesh Legislative Assembly
- Incumbent
- In office December 2018 – 2023
- Preceded by: Chanda Singh Gaur
- Succeeded by: Chanda Singh Gaur
- Constituency: Khargapur

Personal details
- Pronunciation: Rahul Singh Lodhi
- Born: 6 December 1977 (age 48) Chhatarpur, Madhya Pradesh, India
- Party: Bharatiya Janata party
- Parent(s): H. P. Singh (father), Nandini Singh (mother)
- Education: Graduate
- Alma mater: Guru Ghasidas Vishwavidyalaya, Bilaspur, Chhattisgarh
- Occupation: Agriculture
- Profession: Agriculture
- Website: rahulsinghkhargapur.in

Rahul Singh Lodhi or Rahul Singh (born 6 December 1977) is a sitting member of the Madhya Pradesh Legislative Assembly from Khargapur constituency, since 2018. He is the nephew of former Union Minister and former Chief Minister of Madhya Pradesh Uma Bharti.
