= Chanda Singh Gaur =

Indian politician

Chanda Singh Gaur MLA

Member of the Madhya Pradesh Legislative Assembly
- In office 2023–Incumbent
- Preceded by: Rahul Singh Lodhi
- Succeeded by: Rahul Singh Lodhi
- In office 2013–2018
- Preceded by: Ajay Yadav
- Succeeded by: Rahul Singh Lodhi
- Constituency: Khargapur

Personal details
- Born: 1 May 1960 (age 65)
- Citizenship: India
- Party: INC, (Indian National Congress)
- Spouse: Surendra Singh Gaur
- Education: HSC
- Alma mater: Narendra S. Gour H.S. School, Karmora
- Profession: Politician

Chanda Surendra Singh Gaur is an Indian politician and a member of the Indian National Congress party.

== Political career ==
She became an MLA in 2013 and 2023.

== Political views ==
She supports the Congress Party's ideology.

== Personal life ==
She is married to Surendra Singh Gaur.

== See also ==
- Madhya Pradesh Legislative Assembly
- 2013 Madhya Pradesh Legislative Assembly election
- 2008 Madhya Pradesh Legislative Assembly election
