= Mohangarh =

Village in Madhya Pradesh, India

- Village
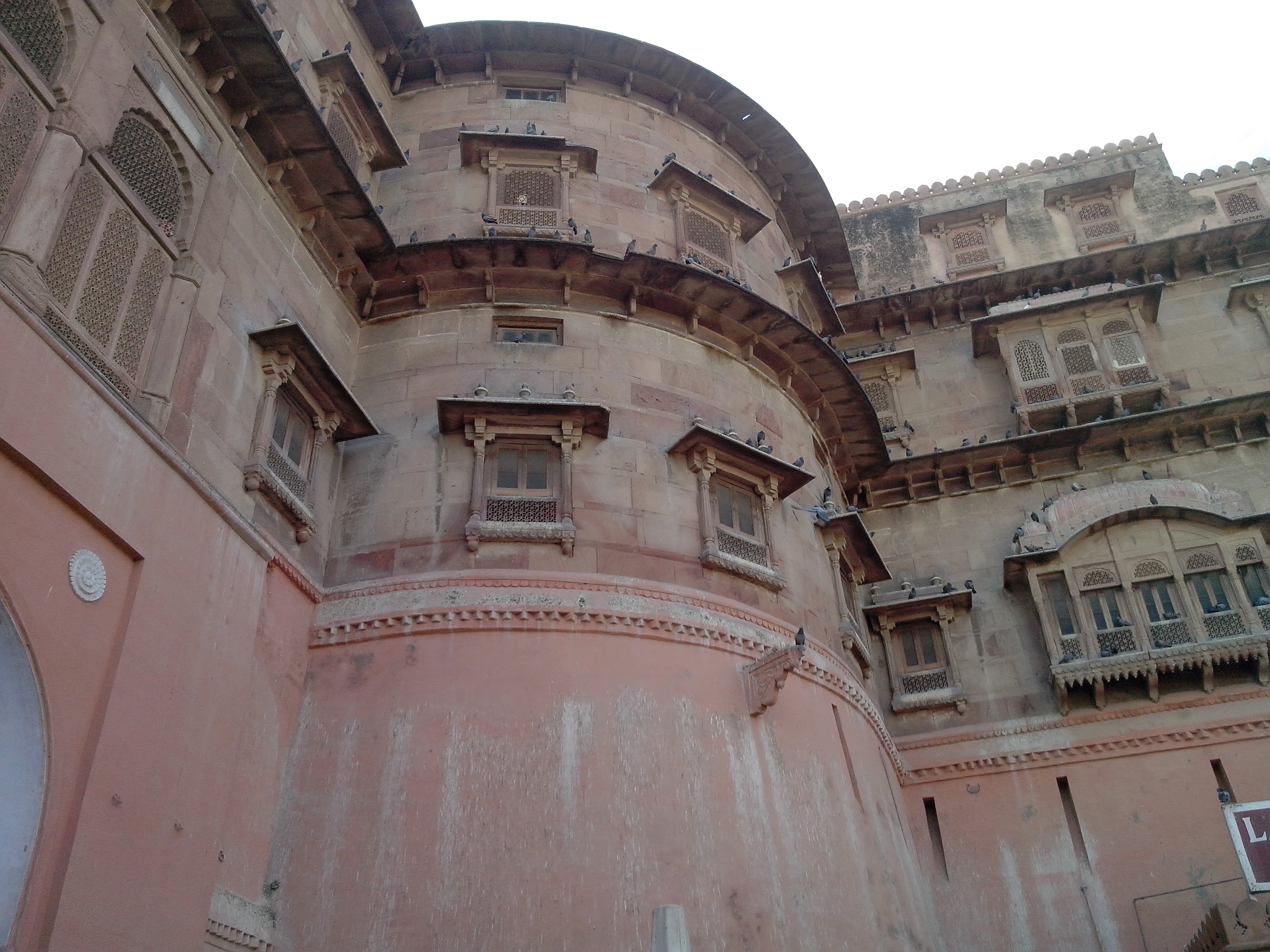
- Mohangarh Fort

- Location in Madhya Pradesh, India Mohangarh (India)
- Coordinates: 24.99°N 78.67°E

Government
  - Type: Gram Panchayat

Population (2011)
  - Total: 5,812

Languages
  - Official: Hindi

Mohangarh is a town located in Tikamgarh District of Madhya Pradesh. It is also a Tehsil headquarters.

The Mohangarh town has population of 5812 of which 3123 are males while 2689 are females as per the population census of 2011. In total 1233 families reside here.
