= Baldeogarh =

- Town
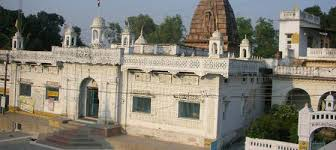
- Aharji Jain Mandir and Teerth

- Location in Madhya Pradesh, India Baldeogarh (India)
- Coordinates: 24.75°N 79.07°E
- Country: India
- State: Madhya Pradesh
- District: Tikamgarh
- Elevation: 319 m (1,047 ft)

Population (2001)
  - Total: 7,585

Languages
  - Official: Hindi
- Time zone: UTC+5:30 (IST)
- ISO 3166 code: IN-MP
- Vehicle registration: MP

Baldeogarh is a town and a nagar panchayat in Tikamgarh district in the state of Madhya Pradesh, India. It is also a Tehsil Headquarter.

== Geography ==
Baldeogarh is located at 24.75°N 79.07°E. It has an average elevation of 319 metres (1046 feet). The headquarters town of the Baldeogarh is a tehsil of the same name.

== Demographics ==
As of 2001 India census, Baldeogarh had a population of 7,585. Males constitute 52% of the population and females 48%. Baldeogarh has an average literacy rate of 51%, lower than the national average of 59.5%; with 62% of the males and 38% of females literate. 20% of the population is under 6 years of age.

== Civil administration ==
Baldeogarh is a Nagar Panchayat city in district of Tikamgarh, Madhya Pradesh. The Baldeogarh city is divided into 15 wards for which elections are held every 5 years.

Baldeogarh Nagar Panchayat has total administration over 1,701 houses to which it supplies basic amenities like water and sewerage. It is also authorize to build roads within Nagar Panchayat limits and impose taxes on properties coming under its jurisdiction.

== Places of interest ==
Fort : There is a fort and pond situated on a famous hill in Baldeogarh. The fort is spread over a huge area, here the cannon of the old times is kept which is worth seeing, there is a famous Devi temple here where a fair is also organized during Navratri.

Aharji : Aharji Jain Teerth is a historical pilgrimage site for Jainism located in Aharji, The main temple is famous for the beautiful colossal monumental image of Lord Shatinath from the. Bahubali temple is another important temple in the area.

== Transportation ==
Baldeogarh is located on Tikamgerh Chhatarpur road. It is well connected with roads. It also connected with divisional headquarter Sagar.
