= Rilli Chamar =

Indian politician

Rilli Chamar was an Indian politician. In the 1952 Vindhya Pradesh Legislative Assembly election Rilli was elected unopposed from the Scheduled Castes reserved seat for the Tikamgarh Assembly constituency, running as a Socialist Party candidate.

Rilli contested the Tikamgarh Lok Sabha constituency in the 1962 Indian general election, as the Indian National Congress candidate. He finished in third place with 57,555 votes (25.98%).
