= Darhi Singh =

Darhi Singh was an Indian socialist politician. He lived in Chauphal village, near Churhat. He stood as a candidate for the seat reserved for Scheduled Tribes in the Sidhi Madwas constituency in the 1952 Vindhya Pradesh Legislative Assembly election, as the Socialist Party candidate. He won the seat, obtaining 7,292 votes. During the latter part of the mandate period, he belonged to the Praja Socialist Party (PSP).
