= Maganlal Goyal =

Indian Independence activist and politician (1927–2012)

Maganlal Goel

Member of the Legislative Assembly
- In office 1977–1980
- Constituency: Tikamgarh Assembly constituency
- In office 1989–1993
- In office 1998–2003

Personal details
- Born: 5 September 1927 Tikamgarh, Madhya Pradesh, India
- Died: 22 February 2012 (aged 84) Tikamgarh, Madhya Pradesh, India
- Party: Bharatiya Janata Party
- Parent(s): Chunnilal Sarraf (father); Sagun Bai (mother)
- Occupation: Independence activist, Politician
- Awards: Utkrishta Seva Samman

Maganlal Goel (5 September 1927 – 22 February 2012) was an Indian independence activist and politician from Madhya Pradesh. He served as an MLA from Tikamgarh three times and held various positions in the Tikamgarh municipal council for 16 years.

== Early life and background ==
He was born on 5 September 1927 in Tikamgarh, Madhya Pradesh. His father's name was Chunnilal Sarraf, and his mother's name was Sagun Bai. He studied at Devendra Sanskrit Vidyalaya in Tikamgarh and had a deep interest in theology, culture, and literature.

== Career ==
He started his public life as a student leader, serving as the Deputy Secretary of the Orchha State Students Congress from 1944 to 1947. He participated in many movements for the independence of the country from 1945 to 1948, and he received an arrest warrant in April 1947 for his involvement in a particular movement. During that period, he also participated in revolutionary activities.

He was elected as an MLA from the Tikamgarh Assembly constituency in 1977, 1989, and 1998 as a member of the Bharatiya Janata Party. He was awarded the Utkrishta Seva Samman by the Madhya Pradesh Legislative Assembly for the period 1998–2003 in appreciation of his development work. He also represented the Nagar Palika Parishad Tikamgarh for 16 years, serving as a Member, Vice-chairman, and President of the Nagarpalika, and served on many committees.

He died on 22 February 2012 in Tikamgarh and was cremated with full state honours by the Madhya Pradesh government.
