= Maharajpur, Madhya Pradesh =

Maharajpur
- Town
- Location in Madhya Pradesh, India
- Coordinates: 25.220457°N 79.724034°E
- Country: India
- State: Madhya Pradesh
- District: Chhatarpur
- Elevation: 452 m (1,483 ft)

Population (2011)
  - Total: 4,264

Languages
  - Official: Hindi
- Time zone: UTC+5:30 (IST)
- PIN
- ISO 3166 code: IN-MP
- Vehicle registration: MP-16

Maharajpur is a tehsil and a nagar palika parishad in Chhatarpur district in the Indian state of Madhya Pradesh.

== Geography ==
Chhatarpur is located at 22.6°N 80.37°E. It has an average elevation of 452 metres (1,483 ft).

== Demographics ==
As of the 2011 Census of India, Maharajpur had a population of 21,532. Males constitute 53% of the population and females 47%. Maharajpur has an average literacy rate of 53%, lower than the national average of 59.5%: male literacy is 63%, and female literacy is 43%. In Maharajpur, 16% of the population is under six years of age.

== Maharajpur Assembly constituency ==
Maharajpur, Madhya Pradesh Assembly constituency is one of the 230 Vidhan Sabha (Legislative Assembly) constituencies of Madhya Pradesh state. The current MLA from Maharajpur is Kamakhya Pratap Singh (Teeka Raja) who fought from BJP seat and won.
