= Harishankar Khatik =

Indian politician

MLA, Legislative Assembly
- Constituency: Jatara

Personal details
- Born: 1968 (age 57–58) Palera district Tikamgarh M.P.
- Party: Bharatiya Janata Party
- Children: 4
- Parent: Sh. Bhagwan Das Khatik
- Education: civil diploma Polytechnic college Nowgaon
- Occupation: Agriculture
- Profession: politician
- Committees: MLA Jatara, Pradesh Mahamantri BJP M.P.

Harishankar Khatik is an Indian politician and a member of the Legislative Assembly of India representing the Jatara constituency of Madhya Pradesh and is a member of the Bhartiya Janata Party.

== Early life and education ==
Harishankar Khatik was born in Tikamgarh district and completed 12th, higher secondary in 1985 and diploma in Civil Engineering in 1994 from Polytechnic, Bhopal.

== Political career ==
Harishankar Khatik is a MLA representing the Jatara constituency and is a member of the Bhartiya Janata Party.
