= Kamakhya Pratap Singh =

Indian politician

Personal details
- Born: 22/09/1987

Kamakhya Pratap Singh
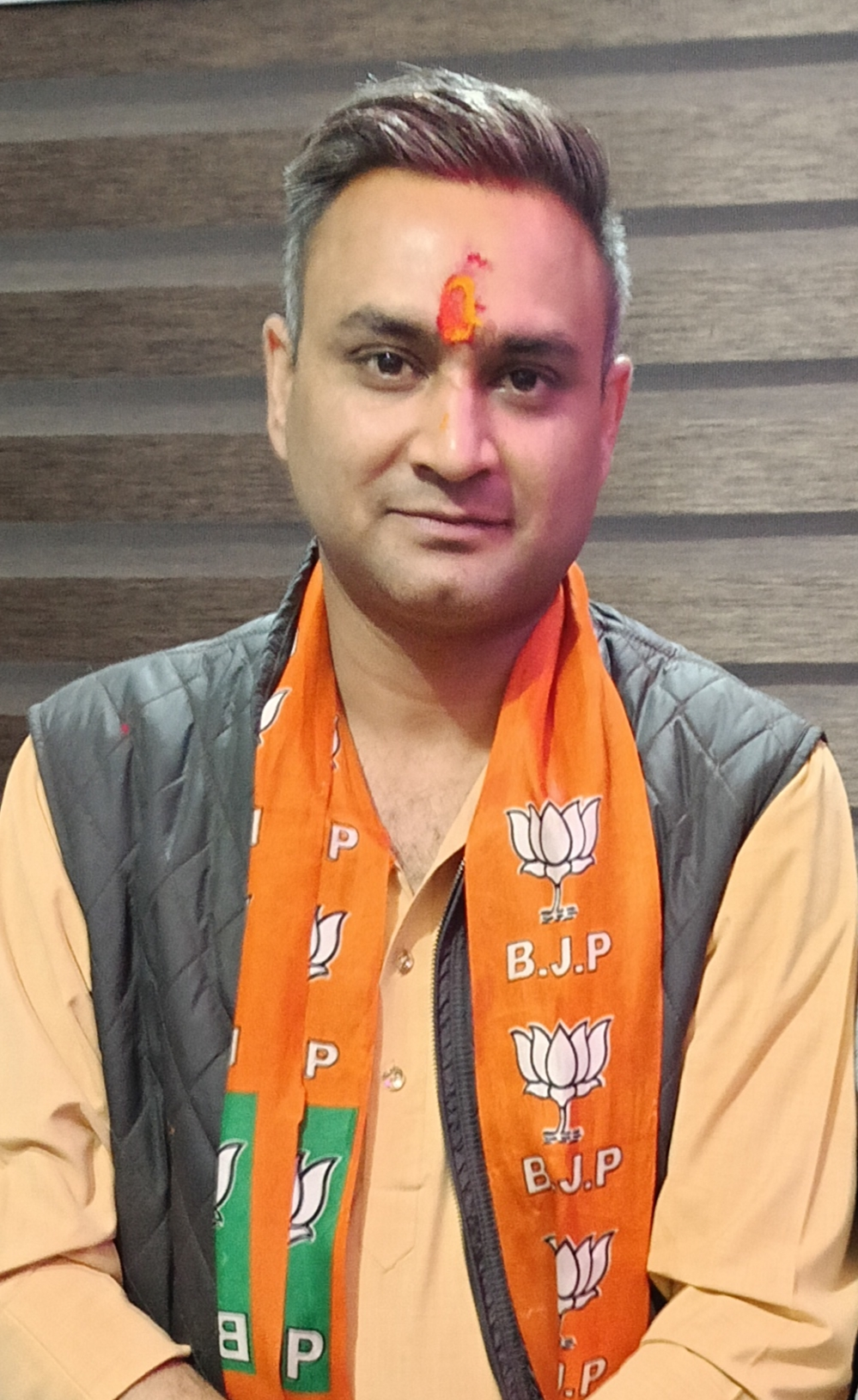

Member of Madhya Pradesh Legislative Assembly
- Incumbent
- Assumed office 2023
- Preceded by: Neeraj Vinod Dixit
- Constituency: Maharajpur

Personal details
- Political party: Bharatiya Janata Party
- Profession: Politician

Kamakhya Pratap Singh is an Indian politician from Madhya Pradesh. He is a Member of the Madhya Pradesh Legislative Assembly from 2023, representing Maharajpur, Madhya Pradesh Assembly constituency, as a Member of the Bharatiya Janata Party.

== Political career ==
Singh was nominated as the Bharatiya Janata Party candidate for the Maharajpur constituency in the 2023 Madhya Pradesh Legislative Assembly election. He contested against Indian National Congress candidate Dixit Neeraj Vinod. Singh won the election with a margin of 26,617 votes, securing a total of 76,969 votes, while the Congress candidate, Vinod, received 50,352 votes.

== See also ==
- 2023 Madhya Pradesh Legislative Assembly election
- Madhya Pradesh Legislative Assembly
