= Dinesh Ahirwar =

Indian politician

MLA Dinesh Ahirwar

Member of the Madhya Pradesh Legislative Assembly
- Incumbent
- Assumed office 2013
- Preceded by: Harishankar Khatik
- Constituency: Jatara

Personal details
- Born: 20 June 1964 (age 61)
- Citizenship: India
- Party: INC, (Indian National Congress)
- Spouse: Tara Devi
- Parent: Kuttulal Ahirwar (father)
- Education: MA in History
- Profession: Politician

Dinesh Ahirwar is an Indian politician and a member of the Indian National Congress party.

== Political career ==
He became an MLA in 2013.

== Personal life ==
He is married to Mrs. Tara Devi and has two sons and one daughter.

== See also ==
- Madhya Pradesh Legislative Assembly
- 2013 Madhya Pradesh Legislative Assembly election
