= Hansraj (Bijawar) =

Indian politician

Hansraj was an Indian politician from the state of Madhya Pradesh. He represented Bijawar Vidhan Sabha constituency of undivided Madhya Pradesh Legislative Assembly by winning the 1957 Madhya Pradesh Legislative Assembly election.
