= Jatara =

Town in Madhya Pradesh, India

- Town
- Location in Madhya Pradesh, India Jatara (India)
- Coordinates: 25.02°N 79.05°E
- Country: India
- State: Madhya Pradesh
- District: Tikamgarh

Government
  - MLA: Hari Shankar Khatik
- Elevation: 246 m (807 ft)

Population (2011)
  - Total: 17,499

Languages
  - Official: Hindi - Bundeli
- Time zone: UTC+5:30 (IST)
- PIN: 472118
- Telephone code: 07681
- Vehicle registration: MP-36
- Sex ratio: 910 ♂/♀
- Website: https://youtube.com/@Jatara_Production?si=VDqw4ge_TfiX-gO8

Jatara is a town and a nagar palika parishad in Tikamgarh district in the Indian state of Madhya Pradesh.

== Geography ==
Jatara is located at 25.02°N 79.05°E. It has an average elevation of 246 metres (807 feet). It is situated near Khajuraho and Orchha.

== Demographics ==
As of the 2001 Census of India, Jatara had a population of 15,593. Males constitute 52% of the population and females 48%. Jatara has an average literacy rate of 57%, lower than the national average of 59.5%: male literacy is 65%, and female literacy is 47%. In Jatara, 18% of the population is under 6 years of age.
