= Tikamgarh Assembly constituency =

Assembly constituency in Madhya Pradesh

Coordinates: 24.75°N 78.83°E

Tikamgarh
- Constituency No. 43 for the Madhya Pradesh Legislative Assembly

Constituency details
- Country: India
- Region: Central India
- State: Madhya Pradesh
- District: Tikamgarh
- Lok Sabha constituency: Tikamgarh
- Established: 1951
- Reservation: None

Member of Legislative Assembly
- 16th Madhya Pradesh Legislative Assembly
- Incumbent Yadvendra Singh
- Party: Indian National Congress
- Elected year: 2023
- Preceded by: Rakesh Giri

Tikamgarh Assembly constituency is one of the 230 Vidhan Sabha (Legislative Assembly) constituencies of Madhya Pradesh state in central India. This constituency came into existence in 1951, as one of the 48 Vidhan Sabha constituencies of the erstwhile Vindhya Pradesh state.

== Overview ==
Tikamgarh (constituency number 43) is one of the 5 Vidhan Sabha constituencies located in Tikamgarh district. This constituency covers the entire Tikamgarh tehsil of the district.

Tikamgarh is part of Tikamgarh Lok Sabha constituency along with seven other Vidhan Sabha segments, namely, Jatara, Prithvipur, Niwari and Khargapur in this district and Maharajpur, Chhatarpur and Bijawar in Chhatarpur district.

== Members of Legislative Assembly ==
=== Vindhya Pradesh Legislative Assembly ===
Year	Member	Party
1952	Krishna Kant	Kisan Mazdoor Praja Party
1952	Rilli Chamar	Socialist Party

=== Madhya Pradesh Legislative Assembly ===
Year	Member	Party
1957	Ram Krishna	Indian National Congress
1962	Gyanendra Singh Dev	Independent politician
1967	Gyanendra Singh Dev	Indian National Congress
1972	Sardar Singh	Indian National Congress
1977	Maganlal Goyal	Janata Party
1980	Sardar Singh	Indian National Congress (Indira)
1985	Yadvendra Singh	Indian National Congress
1990	Maganlal Goyal	Bharatiya Janata Party
1993	Yadvendra Singh	Indian National Congress
1998	Maganlal Goyal	Bharatiya Janata Party
2003	Akhand Pratap Singh Yadav	Bharatiya Janata Party
2008	Yadvendra Singh	Indian National Congress
2013	Krishna Kumar Shrivastava	Bharatiya Janata Party
2018	Rakesh Giri	Bharatiya Janata Party
2023	Yadvendra Singh	Indian National Congress

== Election results ==
=== 2023 ===
2023 Madhya Pradesh Legislative Assembly election: Tikamgarh
Party	Candidate	Votes	%	±%
INC	Yadvendra Singh	83,397	46.87	+5.04
BJP	Rakesh Giri	74,279	41.75	−2.87
Independent	Krishna Kumar Shrivastava	8,672	4.87	
BSP	Seetaram Lodhi	1,894	1.06	−5.47
NOTA	None of the above	466	0.26	−0.68
Majority		9,118	5.12	+2.33
Turnout		177,922	78.8	+4.09
INC gain from BJP		Swing		

=== 2018 ===
2018 Madhya Pradesh Legislative Assembly election: Tikamgarh
Party	Candidate	Votes	%	±%
BJP	Rakesh Giri	66,958	44.62	
INC	Yadvendra Singh	62,783	41.83	
BSP	Vinod Kumar Rai	9,793	6.53	
SP	Chhakkey Lal Kushwaha	2,046	1.36	
Independent	Santosh Kushwaha	1,757	1.17	
NOTA	None of the above	1,405	0.94	
Majority		4,175	2.79	
Turnout		150,074	74.71	
BJP hold		Swing		

== See also ==
- Tikamgarh
