= Shishupal Yadav =

Indian politician

Member of the Madhya Pradesh Legislative Assembly
- Incumbent
- Assumed office 2021
- Preceded by: Brajendra Singh Rathore
- Constituency: Prithvipur

Personal details
- Party: Bharatiya Janata Party
- Other political affiliations: Samajwadi Party (until 2021)
- Education: Allahabad University
- Profession: Politician

Shishupal Yadav is a member of the Madhya Pradesh Legislative Assembly in India. He was elected from Prithvipur constituency as a member of Bharatiya Janata Party in 2021.

== Early life ==
Shishupal Yadav hails from Uttar Pradesh.

== Political career ==
Yadav contested as a Samajwadi Party (SP) candidate and lost the 2018 Madhya Pradesh Legislative Assembly election from Prithvipur constituency to Congress candidate Brajendra Singh Rathore. He later quit SP and joined Bharatiya Janata Party in 2021. He was elected from Prithvipur constituency as a Member of the Legislative Assembly of Madhya Pradesh representing Bharatiya Janata Party in 2021 by-polls, necessitated by the death of Rathore, defeating the Congress candidate Nitendra Singh Rathore, son of Brajendra Singh.
