= Lidhora Khas =

Lidhorakhas
- Town
- Location in Madhya Pradesh, India
- Coordinates: 25°4′25″N 78°52′05″E
- Country: India
- State: Madhya Pradesh
- District: Tikamgarh

Population (2001)
  - Total: 10,668

Languages
  - Official: Hindi
- Time zone: UTC+5:30 (IST)
- ISO 3166 code: IN-MP
- Vehicle registration: MP

Lidhorakhas is a town and a Tehsil in Tikamgarh district in the Indian state of Madhya Pradesh.

== Demographics ==
As of the 2011 Census of India, Lidhorakhas had a population of 12,974. Males constitute 52% of the population and females 48%. Lidhorakhas has an average literacy rate of 48%, lower than the national average of 59.5%: male literacy is 60%, and female literacy is 35%. In Lidhorakhas, 20% of the population is under 6 years of age.
