= Pushpendra Nath Pathak =

Indian politician

- Born: Guddan; 7 April 1963 (age 63); Chhatarpur, Madhya Pradesh
- Other name: Guddan Pathak
- Citizenship: Indian
- Education: M.A., L.L.B.
- Occupations: Politician farmer advocate
- Known for: public welfare
- Predecessor: Asha Rani
- Successor: Incumbent
- Political party: BJP

Pushpendra Nath Pathak "Guddan Pathak" is an Ex-Member of Legislative Assembly Madhya Pradesh. He was elected from Bijawar seat in 2013 Madhya Pradesh Legislative Assembly election

== Election 2013 ==
Guddan Pathak was a candidate of BJP in 2008 Elections from Maharajpur Assembly Constituency and lost the seat to Manvendra Singh, an ex-Congress Minister turned as an Independent Candidate. In 2013, due to pre-election incidents Manvendra Singh was declared an authorised candidate of BJP from Maharajpur Assembly Constituency. This step resulted in annoying the party workers and a number of protests followed. The Party, then, on the last day of nominations, declared Guddan Pathak, as an authorised party candidate from Bijawar Assembly Constituency. Pushpendra Nath 'Guddan Pathak', who was a new and unknown face for this area, accepted the challenge and started the campaign. The Real-time support from Chief Minister Shivraj Singh Chouhan and dedication of the party workers resulted in a win.

Preceded by Asha Rani	MLA of MP for Bijawar Seat; 2013-Incumbent	Succeeded by Incumbent
