= Prithvipur Assembly constituency =

Assembly constituency in Madhya Pradesh

Coordinates: 25.22°N 78.75°E

Prithvipur
- Constituency No. 45 for the Madhya Pradesh Legislative Assembly

Constituency details
- Country: India
- Region: Central India
- State: Madhya Pradesh
- District: Niwari
- Lok Sabha constituency: Tikamgarh
- Established: 1951
- Reservation: None

Member of Legislative Assembly
- 16th Madhya Pradesh Legislative Assembly
- Incumbent Nitendra Singh Rathore
- Party: Indian National Congress
- Elected year: 2023
- Preceded by: Shishupal Yadav

Prithvipur Assembly constituency is one of the 230 Vidhan Sabha (Legislative Assembly) constituencies of Madhya Pradesh state in central India. Initially, it came into existence in 1951 as one of the 48 Vidhan Sabha constituencies of the erstwhile Vindhya Pradesh state, but it was abolished in 1956. This constituency again came into existence in 2008, following the delimitation of the legislative assembly constituencies. Prithvipur is small town of Bundelkhand.

== Overview ==
Prithvipur (constituency number 45) is one of the 5 Vidhan Sabha constituencies located in Niwari District. This constituency covers the Prithvipur and Jeron Khalsa nagar panchayats and parts of Jatara and Prithvipur tehsils of the district.

Prithivpur is part of Tikamgarh Lok Sabha constituency along with seven other Vidhan Sabha segments, namely, Tikamgarh, Jatara, Niwari and Khargapur in this district and Maharajpur, Chhatarpur and Bijawar in Chhatarpur district.

== Members of Legislative Assembly ==
=== Vindhya Pradesh Legislative Assembly ===
Election	Name	Party
1952	Shyam Lal	Indian National Congress

=== Madhya Pradesh Legislative Assembly ===
Year	Member	Party
2008	Brajendra Singh Rathore	Indian National Congress
2013	Aneeta Suneel Nayak	Bharatiya Janata Party
2018	Brijendra Singh Rathore	Indian National Congress
2021 (Note: by-poll)	Shishupal Yadav	Bharatiya Janata Party
2023	Nitendra Singh Rathore	Indian National Congress

== Election results ==
=== 2023 ===
2023 Madhya Pradesh Legislative Assembly election: Prithvipur
Party	Candidate	Votes	%	±%
INC	Nitendra Singh Rathore	85,739	48.35	▲5.31
BJP	Shishupal Yadav	83,908	47.32	▼12.81
BSP	Ashish Kumar Raikwar	1,614	0.91	▼19.35
NOTA	None of the above	823	0.46	▲0.22
Majority		1,831	1.03	▼4.11
Turnout		177,335	83.2	▲3.79
INC gain from BJP		Swing		

=== 2021 bypolls ===
By-election, 2021: Prithvipur
Party	Candidate	Votes	%	±%
BJP	Shishupal Yadav	82,673	53.12	+46.11
INC	Nitendra Singh Rathore	66,986	43.04	+8.04
SP	Moti Lal Kushwaha	1,181	0.76	−29.00
NOTA	None of the Above	1,741	1.12	
Margin of victory		15,687	10.08	
Turnout		1,55,796	78.47	
BJP gain from INC		Swing		

=== 2018 ===
2018 Madhya Pradesh Legislative Assembly election: Prithvipur
Party	Candidate	Votes	%	±%
INC	Brajendra Singh Rathore	52,436	35.36	
SP	Shishupal Yadav	44,816	30.22	
BSP	Kushwaha Nandram	30,043	20.26	
BJP	Abhay Akhand Pratap Singh Yadav	10,391	7.01	
Independent	Mukesh Bhadoriya	1,418	0.96	
NOTA	None of the above	359	0.24	
Majority		7,620	5.14	
Turnout		148,310	79.41	
