= Palera =

- Town
- Location in Madhya Pradesh, India Palera (India)
- Coordinates: 25.02°N 79.23°E
- Country: India
- State: Madhya Pradesh
- District: Tikamgarh
- Elevation: 246 m (807 ft)

Population (2001)
  - Total: 14,646

Languages
  - Official: Hindi
- Time zone: UTC+5:30 (IST)
- PIN: 472221
- ISO 3166 code: IN-MP
- Vehicle registration: MP

Palera is a town and a nagar parishad in Tikamgarh district in the Indian state of Madhya Pradesh.

== Geography ==
Palera is located at 25.02°N 79.23°E. It has an average elevation of 350 metres (1200 feet).

== Demographics ==
As of 2001 India census, Palera had a population of 14,646. Males constitute 53% of the population and females 47%. Palera has an average literacy rate of 52%, lower than the national average of 59.5%: male literacy is 62%, and female literacy is 41%. In Palera, 19% of the population is under 6 years of age.
