= Kundeshwar =

- Religious Place
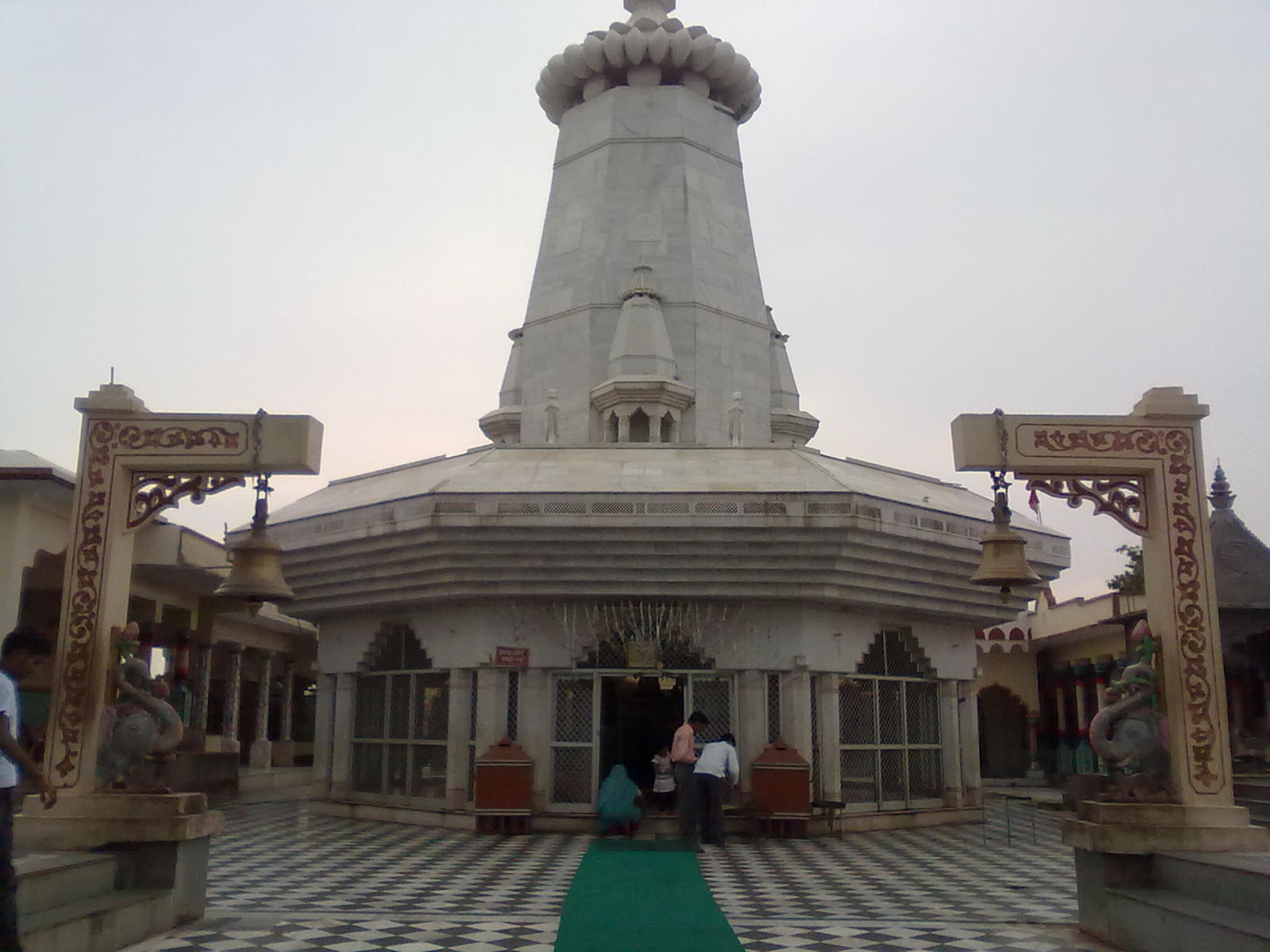
- Shiva temple in Kundeshwar
- Nickname: ShivPuri
- Location in Madhya Pradesh, India
- Coordinates: 24°41′28″N 78°47′49″E
- Country: India
- State: Madhya Pradesh
- Region: Bundelkhand
- Division: Sagar
- District: Tikamgarh
- Elevation: 427 m (1,401 ft)

Population (2001)
  - Total: 2,500

Languages
  - Official: Hindi, Bundeli, English
- Time zone: UTC+5:30 (IST)
- PIN: 472005
- Telephone code: +91 7683
- Vehicle registration: MP-36
- Literacy: 68%

Kundeshwar is a village situated in Tikamgarh District, 5 km south of Tikamgarh, Madhya Pradesh, India. It is known for kundadev Mahadev an ancient temple on the bank of the Jamdhar river, and is the location of Kundadev Mahadev Temple.

== History ==
According to a legend, a woman by the name of Dhantibai used to live in Era 1204. One day, as she was pestling grain on a mortar atop a hill, blood started to come out from it. She panicked and called for help. When Maharaja Madan Varman came, he noticed a Shivling at the spot. He then built Kundeshwar Temple at that location.

According to the ethics, Banpur was the capital of Banasur, the king of demons and a great devotee of the Lord Siva Mahadev, her daughter Usha Devi was also a devotee of Shiv Linga of Mahadev. Usha Devi was married to Anirudha, the grandson of Lord Krishna and son of Pradumna.

Bagwar Suryawanshi, a Bira Kshatriya was Baghwa - Lion rider in Madhya Desh called Baghroha from Banpur to the dense forest of Jamdhar river long back before Samvat 1201(1144 A.D.) as engraved footnote found below the idol of Nandi Mahadev.

Gaharwar Raja Govindachandra moved his capital from Kannauj to Varansi (1114-1154). Gaharwars were emigrated to various part of the country and their descendants are known as Danesra, Abhaipura, Kapolia, Kora, Jarkhera, Padma, Aihara, Parakh, Chandela, Bira, Beruari, Kherodia and Chandra Kamdhujs respectively. Amongst 13 sons of Punja Kamdhuj, Muktaman, who conquered possession in the north from Bhan Tuar, his descendants called Bira Kamdhuj came to occupy territory of Madhya Desh - Bundelkhand.

Raja Vir Singh Deo (r. 1605-1627), a ruler of strong principles; he was not only a warrior but an enthusiastic builder, leaving many monuments, forts and temples; he patronised the building up of the temple and awarded with the title of Panda or Pandya of Kundeshwar Mahadev to Bagwar clan with copper plate Rajagya owing to their Rajput ancestry.

Raja Mahendra Vikramajit 1776/1817 and Maharaja Mahendra Sawai Pratap Singh Ju Deo 1874/1930 and their successors continued to patronise until merger of the State into the Indian Republic and registration of Shree Aashutosh Aparna Dharmsetu Lok Nyas, Kundeshwar on 22 February 1980.

To the south is Usha Waterfall. The village possesses an archaeological museum.
