= Bijawar =

- city
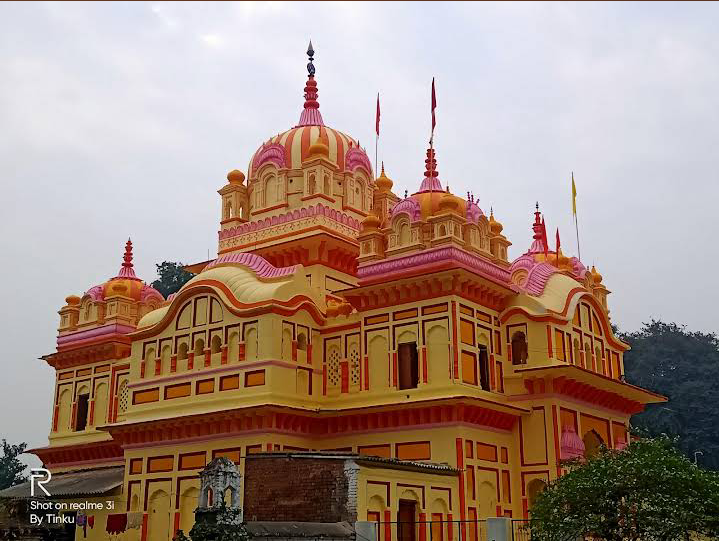
- Bijawar Mandir

- Location in Madhya Pradesh, India Bijawar (India)
- Coordinates: 24.63°N 79.5°E
- Country: India
- State: Madhya Pradesh
- District: Chhatarpur

Government
  - Body: Government of Madhya Pradesh
- Elevation: 398 m (1,306 ft)

Population (2011)
  - Total: 20,513

Languages
  - Official: Hindi
- Time zone: UTC+5:30 (IST)
- PIN: 471405
- Vehicle registration: MP-16

Bijawar is a city in the state of Madhya Pradesh, India. It is the administrative headquarters of Bijawar Taluk, and was formerly the capital of a princely state of British India of the same name. The people of Bijawar are demanding the district status from their state government. It is the 53rd proposed district of Madhya Pradesh

== History ==
The native state of Bijawar covered an area of 2520 km^{2} (973 sq. m.) in the Bundelkhand Agency. Forests covered nearly half the total area of the state, which was believed to be rich in minerals, but lack of transport facilities had hindered the development of its resources.

The state takes its name from the chief town, Bijawar, which was founded by Bijai Singh, one of the Gond chiefs of Garha Mandla, in the 17th century. The first ruler of the state was Bir Singh Deo (1765–93), a Bundela Rajput descended from the ruler of Orchha. It was conquered in the 18th century by Chhatarsal, the founder of Panna, a Rajput of the Bundela clan, by whose descendants it was held till its accession to India. It was confirmed to Ratan Singh in 1811 by the British government for the usual deed of allegiance. In 1857 Bhan Pratap Singh rendered signal services to the British during the Mutiny, being rewarded with certain privileges and a hereditary salute of eleven guns. In 1866 he received the title of Maharaja, and the prefix Sawai in 1877. Bhan Pratap was succeeded on his death in 1899 by his adopted son, Sanwant Singh, a son of the Maharaja of Orchha.

The state acceded to India on 1 January 1950, and became part of the state of Vindhya Pradesh, which was merged into Madhya Pradesh on 1 November 1956.

Bijawar is also known for Jatashankar, a holy place about 18 km from the town. Bijawar is also known for Janki Nibas Temple because it is similar to Ayodhya Temple. Another famous temple, Kanchan Temple, was built by Maharani Kanchan Kuwar of Bijawar. Maharani Kanchan Kuwar was born in Karahiya and Princes of Karahiya and was the daughter of Rao Shahab of Karahiya.

=== Rulers ===
The rulers belonged to the Bundela dynasty.

==== Rajas ====
- 1769 - 1793 Bir Singh Deo (b. ... - d. 1793)
- 1793 - 1802 Himmat Bahadur
- 1802 - Dec 1810 Keshri Singh (b. ... - d. 1810)
- 1811 - 1833 Ratan Singh
- 1833 - 1847 Lakshman Singh
- 23 Nov 1847 - 1866 Bhan Pratap Singh

==== Maharajas (title from 1877 Sawai Maharaja) ====
- 1866 - 15 Sep 1899 Bham Pratap Singh
- Jun 1900 - 30 Oct 1940 Savant Singh (b. 1877 - d. 1940)
- 30 Oct 1940 – 15 Aug 1947 Govind Singh (b. 1934 - d. 1983)

== Geography ==
Bijawar is located at 24.63°N 79.5°E. It has an average elevation of 398 metres (1305 feet).

== Demographics ==
As of the 2011 Census of India, Bijawar had a population of 20,513 - 10,838 males and 9,675 females, giving a sex ratio of 893 compared to the state average of 931. There were 2942 children aged 0–6 i.e. 14.34% of the population. The literacy rate was 74.32% compared to a state average of 69.32%. Male literacy was 82.23% but female literacy was only 65.43%.

== See also ==
- Bijawar-Panna Plateau
