= Tikamgarh district =

District of Madhya Pradesh in India

- District of Madhya Pradesh
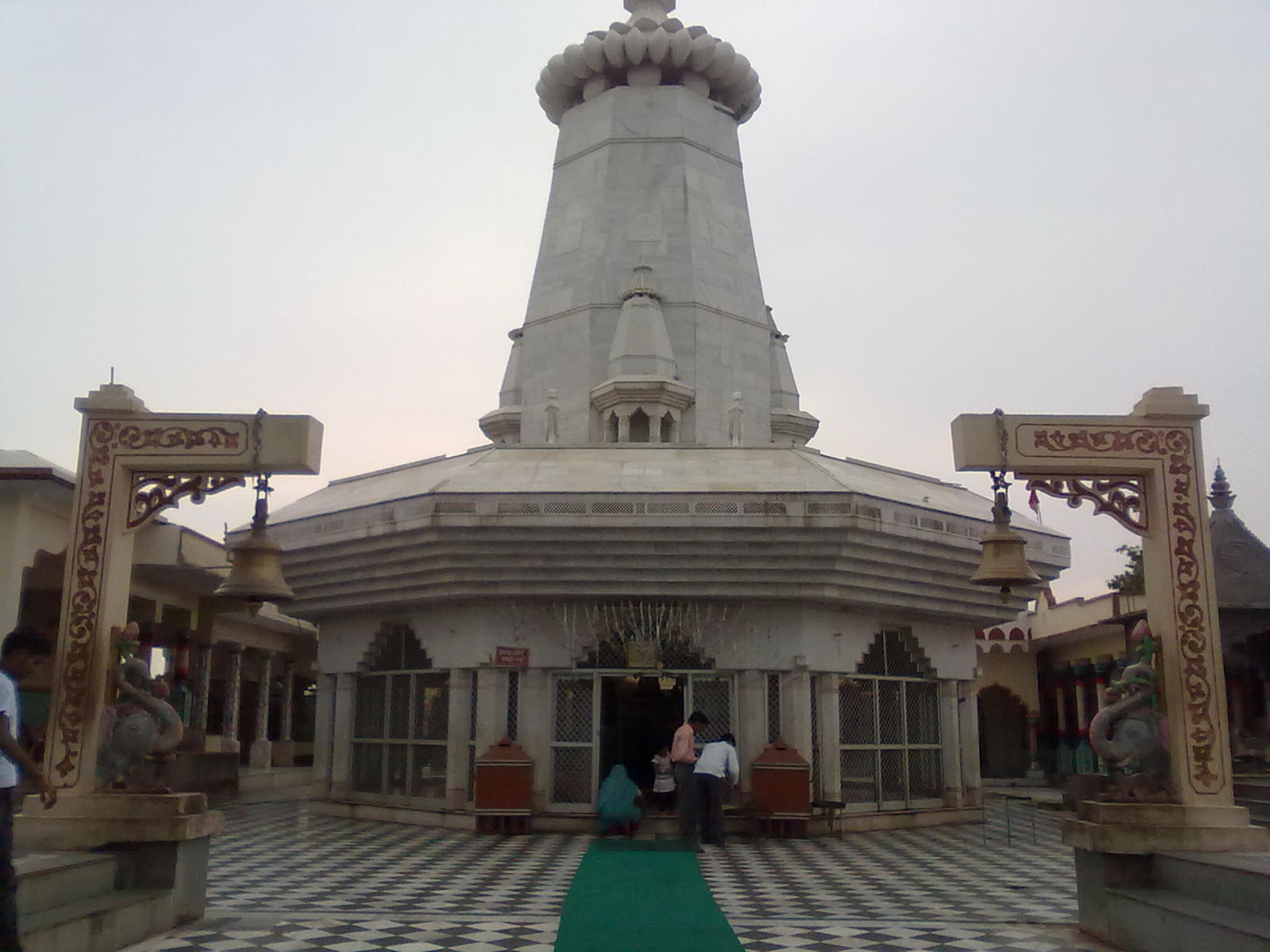
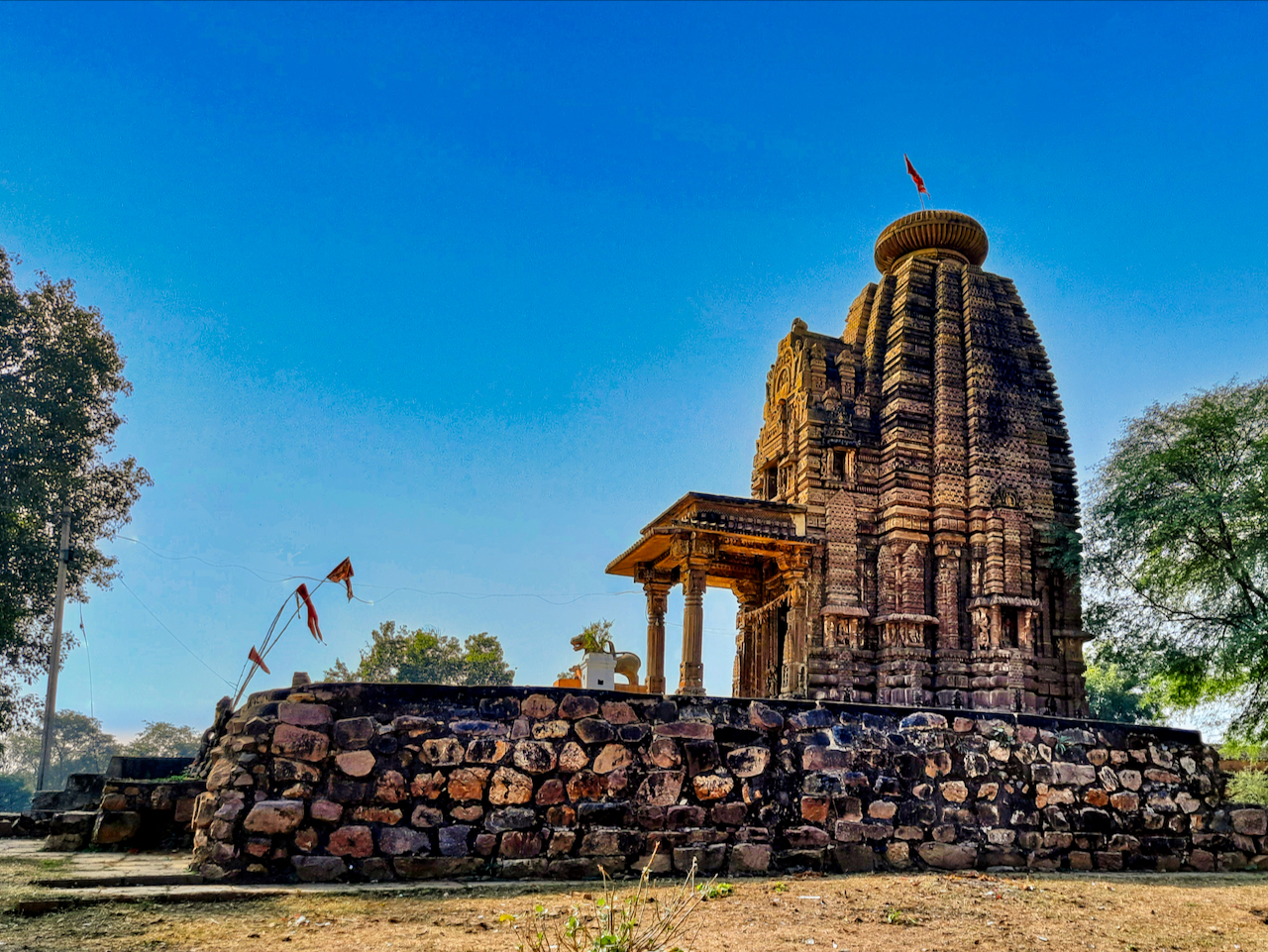
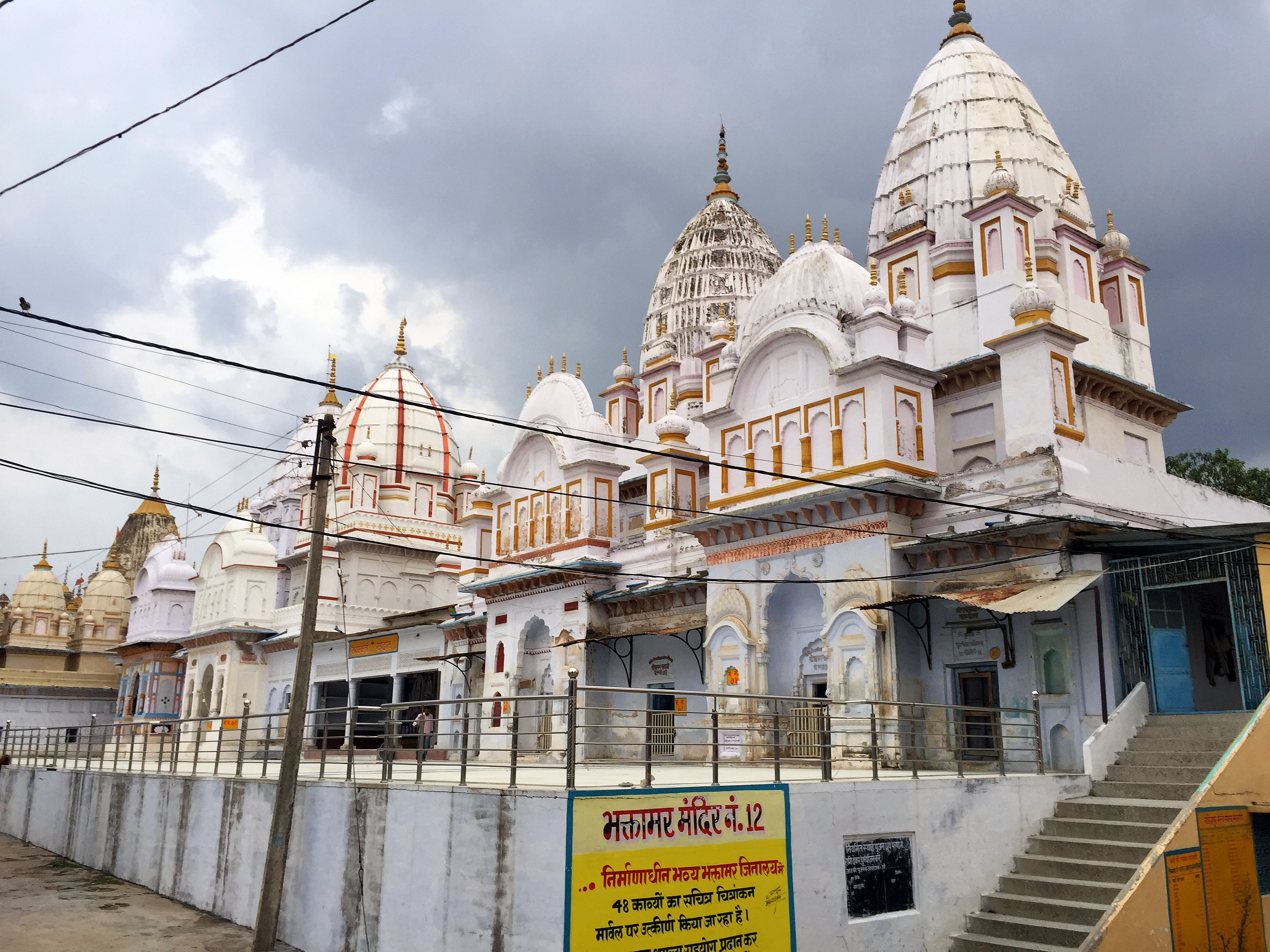
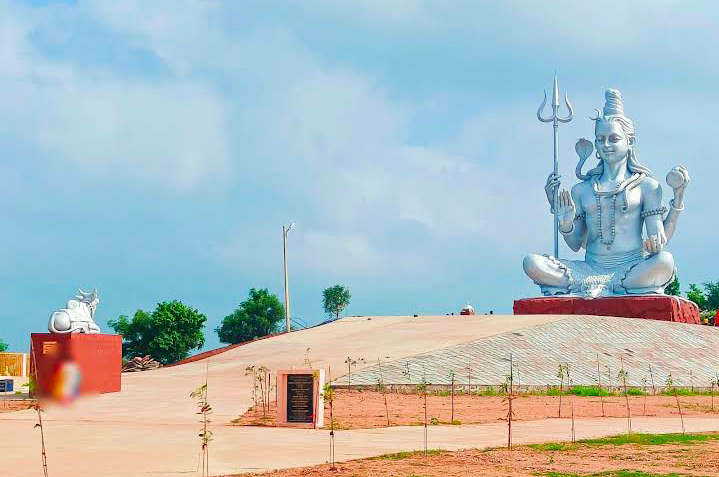
- Left: Kundeshwar Right: Paporaji Bottom: Sun Temple, Madkhera, Shiv Statue, Chhipri

- Location of Tikamgarh district in Madhya Pradesh
- Country: India
- State: Madhya Pradesh
- Division: Sagar
- Headquarters: Tikamgarh
- Tehsils: 1. Tikamgarh, 2. Jatara, 3. Baldeogarh, 4. Palera, 5. Lidhorakhas, 6. Khargapur, 7. Badagaon 8. Mohangarh

Government
  - District Magistrate: Vivek Shrotiya IAS
  - Lok Sabha constituencies: Tikamgarh
  - Vidhan Sabha constituencies: 1. Tikamgarh, 2. Jatara 3. Khargapur

Area
  - Total: 3,878 km^{2} (1,497 sq mi)

Population (2011)
  - Total: 1,040,359
  - Density: 268.3/km^{2} (694.8/sq mi)
- Time zone: UTC+05:30 (IST)
- Vehicle registration: MP 36
- Major highways: NH 12A, SH 10
- Website: tikamgarh.nic.in

Tikamgarh district (Hindi pronunciation: [ʈiːkəmgəɽʱ]) is one of the 55 districts of Madhya Pradesh state in central India. Tikamgarh town is the district headquarters. The district is part of Sagar Division.

It is bounded on the east and southeast by Chhatarpur District of Madhya Pradesh, and by the Uttar Pradesh districts of Lalitpur on the west and Niwari District on the north.

== Etymology ==
The district was named after its headquarters, Tikamgarh. The original name of the town was Tihri. In 1783, the ruler of Orchha Vikramajit (1776–1817) shifted his capital from Orchha to Tihri and renamed it Tikamgarh (Tikam is one of the names of Krishna).

== History ==
The area covered by the district was part of the Princely State of Orchha till its merger with the Indian Union. The Orchha state was founded by Rudra Pratap Singh in 1501. After merger, it became one of the eight districts of Vindhya Pradesh state in 1948. Following the reorganization of states on 1 November 1956 it became a district of the newly carved Madhya Pradesh.

Orchha was founded some times after 1501 AD, by the Bundela chief, Rudra Pratap Singh, who became the first King of Orchha, (r. 1501–1531) and also built the Fort of Orchha. He died in an attempt to save a cow from a lion. The Chaturbhuj Temple was built, during the time of Akbar, by the Queen of Orchha, while Raj Mandir was built by 'Madhukar Shah' during his reign, 1554 to 1591.

During the rule of Mughal Emperor Jahangir, his ally Vir Singh Deo (r. 1605–1627) reigned here, and it was during this period that Orchha reached its height, and many extant palaces are a reminder of its architectural glory, including Jahangir Mahal (born c. 1605) and Sawan Bhadon Mahal.

In the early 17th century, Raja Jhujhar Singh rebelled against the Mughal emperor Shah Jahan, whose armies devastated the state and occupied Orchha from 1635 to 1641. Orchha and Datia were the only Bundela states not subjugated by the Marathas in the 18th century. The town of Tehri, now Tikamgarh, about 52 miles (84 km) south of Orchha, became the capital of Orchha state in 1783, and is now the district town; Tehri was the site of the fort of Tikamgarh, and the town eventually took the name of the fort.

Hamir Singh, who ruled from 1848 to 1874, was elevated to the style of Maharaja in 1865. Maharaja Pratap Singh (born 1854, died 1930), who succeeded to the throne in 1874, devoted himself entirely to the development of his state, himself designing most of the engineering and irrigation works that were executed during his reign.

In 1901, the state had an area of 2,000 sq mi (5,200 km^{2}), and population of 52,634. It was the oldest and highest in rank of all the Bundela states, with a 17-gun salute, and its Maharajas bore the hereditary title of First of the Prince of Bundelkhand. Vir Singh, Pratap Singh's successor, merged his state with the Union of India on January 1, 1950. The district became part of Vindhya Pradesh state, which was merged into Madhya Pradesh state in 1956.

== Economy ==
In 2006 the Ministry of Panchayati Raj named Tikamgarh one of the country's 250 most backward districts (out of a total of 640). It is one of the 24 districts in Madhya Pradesh receiving funds from the Backward Regions Grant Fund Programme (BRGF). The economy of this area mainly based on agriculture and allied activities.

Tikamgarh is a major player in producing pyrophyllite. There are various pyrophyllite mining sites where high-quality pyrophyllite stone is getting mined. The pyrophyllite of Tikamgarh is getting exported to all over India.

== Demographics ==
Tikamgarh district of Madhya Pradesh has a total population of 1,445,166 as per the Census 2011, out of which 760,355 are males while 684,811 are females. In 2011 there were a total of 296,116 families residing in Tikamgarh district. The average sex ratio of Tikamgarh district is 901.

As per Census 2011 out of the total population, 17.3% of people live in urban areas while 82.7% live in rural areas. The average literacy rate in urban areas is 74.7% while that in the rural areas is 58.6%. Also, the sex ratio of urban areas in Tikamgarh district is 909 while that of rural areas is 899. The population of children aged 0–6 years in Tikamgarh district is 227,564 which is 16% of the total population. There are 120,303 male children and 107,261 female children between the ages of 0–6 years. Thus as per the Census 2011, the child sex ratio of Tikamgarh is 892 which is less than the average sex ratio (901) of Tikamgarh district. The total literacy rate of Tikamgarh district is 61.43%. The male literacy rate is 60.41% and the female literacy rate is 42.14% in Tikamgarh district.

The bifurcated district had a population of 1,040,359, of which 170,655 (16.40%) lived in urban areas. Tikamgarh had a sex ratio of 901 females per 1000 males. Schedule Castes and Scheduled Tribes make up 262,163 (25.20%) and 49,613 (4.77%) of the population respectively.

Religions in Tikamgarh district (2011)
Religion	Percent
Hinduism	94.88%
Islam	3.64%
Jains	1.34%
Other or not stated	0.14%

Hindus are 987,048 (94.88%) of the population while Muslims are 37,864 (3.64%) of the population. Jains are 13,953 (1.34%) of the population.

=== Languages ===
Languages of Tikamgarh district (2011)
1. Bundeli (84.9%)
2. Hindi (14.6%)
3. Others (0.45%)

At the time of the 2011 census, 84.94% of the population spoke Bundeli and 14.61% Hindi as their first language.

== Festivals ==
The Moniya Dance in Bundelkhand is performed every year during the festival of light Diwali at the end of October or the first week of November according to the lunar calendar. In this connection, the epic story goes that “in Gokul” when Lord Krishna raised Govardhan Mountain on his finger to save his associates (milkmen), they danced in joy.

== Hospital facilities ==
- Rajendra Prasad District Hospital
- Ayush Wing – District Hospital

== Education ==
=== Schools ===
- Government Excellence Higher Secondary School, Tikamgarh
- Government Excellence Higher Secondary School, Jatara
- Government Excellence Higher Secondary School, Palera
- Government Higher Secondary School, Tikamgarh, No-2
- Jawahar Navodaya Vidhyalaya Tikamgarh
- Kendriya Vidyalaya Tikamgarh
- Model Higher Secondary School, Tikamgarh
- Pushpa High School Tikamgarh
- Saroj Convent Higher Secondary School Tikamgarh

=== Colleges / universities ===
- College of Agriculture, Tikamgarh
- District Institute of Education and Training, Kundeshwar
- Govt Law College Tikamgarh
- Govt P G College Tikamgarh
- Govt College, Lidhoura
- Govt College, Mohangarh
- Govt College, Lidhoura
- Govt Virangana Avanti Bai Girls College, Tikamgarh
- ITI-Tikamgarh, District – Tikamgarh
- ITI-Baldeogarh, District – Tikamgarh
- Polytechnic College, Tikamgarh
- Polytechnic College, Jatara

== Transportation ==
Tikamgarh has the biggest bus stand in Madhya Pradesh.

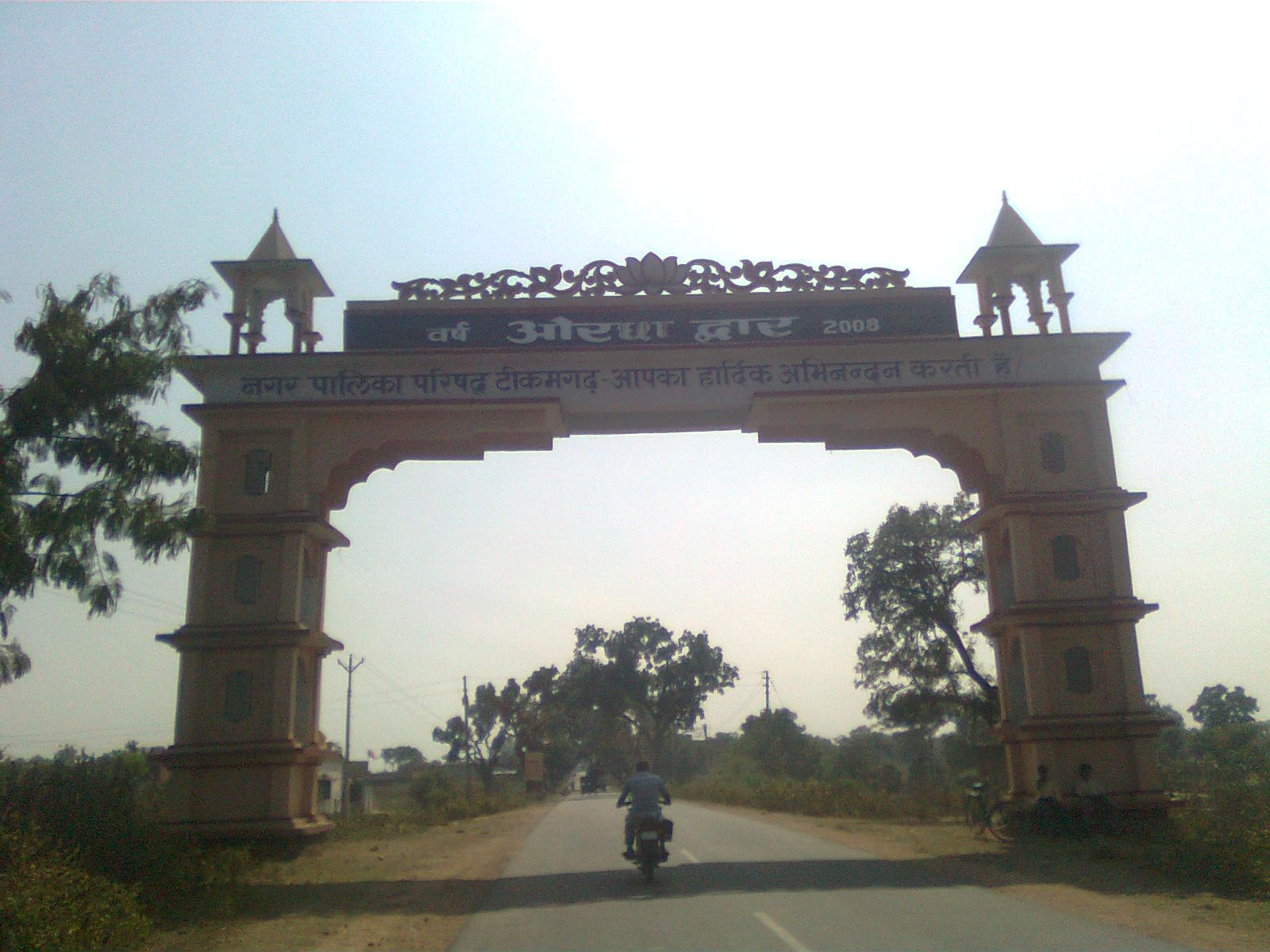
Welcome gate at Jhansi Road In TKG

=== Roads ===
There are daily services of buses for every part of the state. Highways Passing from Tikamgarh are NH-12A, SH-10.

Apart from it, buses for Delhi, Nagpur, Kanpur are also there.

=== Railways ===
Tikamgarh railway station is in the North Central Railway Zone. Its railway code is TKMG. The construction of the railway line to Tikamgarh has been completed in 2012. On 26 April 2013 was connected with railway services. The rail services began from Lalitpur(Uttar Pradesh) to Tikamgarh and were started under the Lalitpur-Singrauli Rail Project. The first train to travel between the two stations was Tikamgarh-Jhansi(Uttar Pradesh) passenger train. The train was sanctioned between the two stations in the Rail Budget of 2012–13. The railway line between Tikamgarh and Lalitpur rail routes is 40 kilometers long. Union Minister Pradeep Jain flagged-off the train at Lalitpur station.

=== Airways ===
Khajuraho is the nearest (114 km) airport from where there is a daily flight for Delhi & Varanasi. which comes under Chhatarpur District.

== Notable tourist spots ==
There are various places to visit in Tikamgarh. Some places are of historical importance.

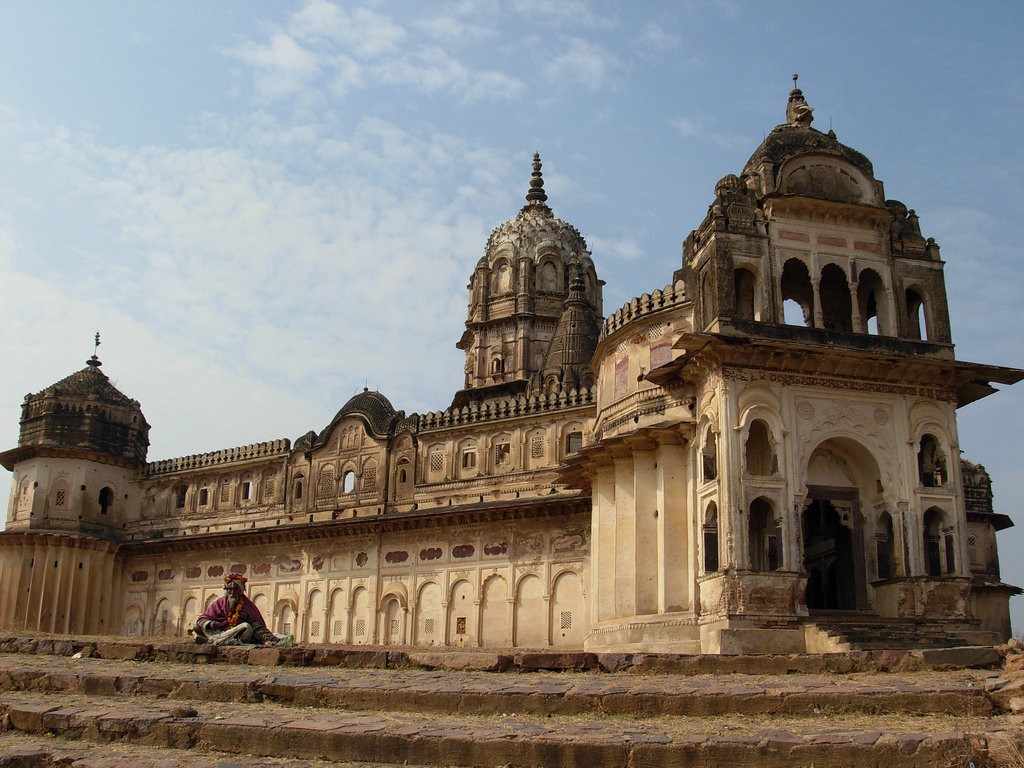
Lakshmi Temple, Orchha.

- Kundeshwar:- An important village situated 5 km. south of Tikamgarh town on the bank of the Jamdar river. It is famous for its Kundadev Mahadev temple. It is believed that Shiv Linga emerged from Kunda.
- Paporaji:- an old village about 5 km southeast of Tikamgarh town. It is a famous Jain pilgrimage centre which attracts a large number of Jain devotees. The village contains about 80 old Jain temples. The famous Jain temples of twenty-four Tirthakars is the main attraction of devotees. An important Jain fair, attended by 10,000 persons, is held in the month of Kartika sudi Purnima.
- Aharji:- A village of Baldeogarh tehsil, Aharji lies on the Tikamgarh-Chhattarpur road at a distance of 25 km. from the district headquarters of the district. Regular buses are available to reach Aharji. It is evidently an old village said to have been populated by Jamalpur Ahars, which was once an important Jain centre. Several ruins, Old images and temples are located here. The village contains three old Jain temples one of these temples has an image of Shantinath 20 feet tall.
- Madkhera:- A small village situated on the northwest of Tikamgarh town at a distance of about 20 km. The importance of this place lies in its famous SUN Temple. Its entrance is from the east. SUN idol is placed here. The other main object of interest of the village is a temple of Vindhya Vasani Devi on the top of the hill.
- Badagaon:- famous Jain temple, Hanuman temple, Shiva temple and Dhasan river.
- Umri :- This temple seems to belong to the Pratihara period in the 9th century A.D. It is an east facing temple consisting of Garbhgriha, Antral and Mukhmandapa. The elevation is in Pancharathi scheme and consist of Plinth, Jangha, Varandika and Shikhar. The pillers of Mukhmanapa are decorated. A sculpture of Lord Surya is installed on the flank wall.

== Geography ==
=== Rivers and lakes ===
The Betwa River flows along the northwestern boundary of the district and Dhasan River on the bank of Badagaon, one of its tributaries flows along the eastern boundary of the district. Both of these rivers flow towards the northeast. The tributaries of the Betwa flowing through this district are Jamni, Bagri and Barua. A New District Named Niwari is Proposed to create consisting of 3 Tehsils Orchha, Prithvipur & Niwari Itself.

== Divisions ==
Tikamgarh district is divided into three sub-divisions, which are further divided into seven tehsils. The district consists four development blocks, namely Tikamgarh, Baldeogarh, Jatara and Palera.

There are 3 Madhya Pradesh Vidhan Sabha constituencies in this district: Tikamgarh, Jatara and Khargapur. All of these are part of Tikamgarh Lok Sabha constituency.

== Civic administration ==
Tikamgarh City
Member of Parliament	Veerendra Kumar Khatik
Collector & DM	Shri Vivek Shrotriya IAS
Superintendent Of Police	Shri Manohar Singh Mandloi IPS
Members of Legislative Assembly	1. Jatara – Mr. Harishankar Khatik; 2. Tikamgarh – Mr. Yadvendra Singh Bundela; 3. Khargapur – Mr. Rahul Singh Lodhi
