= Brijendra Pratap Singh =

Indian politician

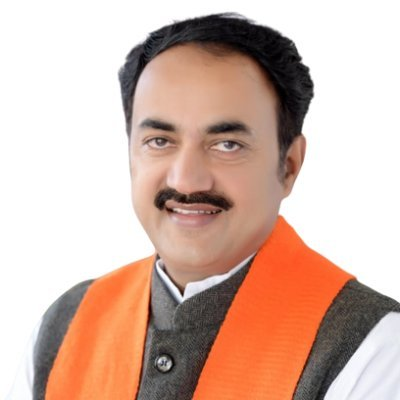

Minister of Mineral Resources and Labour Department
- Incumbent
- Assumed office 2021

Member of the Madhya Pradesh Legislative Assembly
- Incumbent
- Assumed office 2018
- Preceded by: Kusum Mehdele
- Constituency: Panna
- In office 2003–2013
- Preceded by: Ashok Veer Vikram Singh
- Succeeded by: Mukesh Nayak
- Constituency: Pawai

State Minister (Independent charge) for Farmer Development and Agriculture, Public Service Management, Tourism, Sports and Youth Welfare
- In office 2009–2013

Personal details
- Born: 29 August 1967 (age 58)
- Party: Bharatiya Janata Party
- Education: Bachelor of Commerce (Barkatullah University); Bachelor of Laws (Awadhesh Pratap Singh University)
- Nickname: Dau Sahab

Brijendra Pratap Singh also known as Dau Sahab (born 29 August 1967) is an Indian politician from Madhya Pradesh. He is a four time MLA from the Panna Assembly constituency representing the Bhartiya Janta Party. He was serving as minister for mineral resources and labour department from 2021 to 2023 in the Government of Madhya Pradesh.

== Early life and education ==
Singh was born to Uday Pratap Singh. He completed his schooling at Daly College, Indore in 1986. Later, he did his Bachelor of Commerce degree at Barkatullah University, Bhopal and L.L.B. at Awdesh Pratap Singh University, Rewa, Madhya Pradesh. He received the best student award in Daly College, Indore in the year 1985–1986. He was a national level Squash player. He was awarded with a certificate of superior and excellent achievement for shooting in 1986.

== Political career ==
Singh first became an MLA winning the 2003 Madhya Pradesh Legislative Assembly election from Pawai Assembly constituency representing the Bharatiya Janata Party. He was the first leader from the BJP to win in that constituency. He retained the seat in the 2008 Madhya Pradesh Legislative Assembly election but on Bharatiya Janshakti Party ticket. In 2009, he was appointed as the state minister with a portfolio of farmer welfare and agriculture department in second ministry of Shivraj Singh Chauhan. After a year, he was given additional charge of the Department of Public Service Management. In early 2013, due to the illness of senior cabinet minister Tukoji Rao Pawar, the departments of Tourism and Sports and Youth Welfare were also transferred to him.

He won the 2018 Madhya Pradesh Legislative Assembly election on the Bharatiya Janata Party ticket from Panna Assembly constituency. And retained the seat to become an MLA for a fourth term in the 2023 Assembly election.

In 2020, he was included in the 4th cabinet of Shivraj Singh Chouhan. He served as Minister of State (independent charge) for farmers' development and agriculture welfare and tourism and public service management from 2009 to 2013. He was also given additional charge of sports and youth welfare.

== Awards and recognition ==
- He was awarded with the Krishi Karman Award by the Government of India on 15 January 2013 at the Vigyan Bhawan.
- In June 2012, he was awarded the United Nations Public Service Award 2012. He received the award in the second prize category of Improving the delivery of public services.
