= Chhatarpur, Madhya Pradesh Assembly constituency =

Assembly constituency in Madhya Pradesh

Coordinates: 24.91°N 79.59°E

Chhatarpur
- Constituency No. 51 for the Madhya Pradesh Legislative Assembly

Constituency details
- Country: India
- Region: Central India
- State: Madhya Pradesh
- District: Chhatarpur
- Lok Sabha constituency: Tikamgarh
- Established: 1951
- Reservation: None

Member of Legislative Assembly
- 16th Madhya Pradesh Legislative Assembly
- Incumbent Lalita Yadav
- Party: Bharatiya Janata Party
- Elected year: 2023
- Preceded by: Alok Chaturvedi

Chhatarpur Assembly constituency is one of the 230 Vidhan Sabha (Legislative Assembly) constituencies of Madhya Pradesh state in central India. This constituency came into existence in 1951, as one of the 48 Vidhan Sabha constituencies of the erstwhile Vindhya Pradesh state.

== Overview ==
Chhatarpur (constituency number 51) is one of the 6 Vidhan Sabha constituencies located in Chhatarpur district. This constituency covers the Chhatarpur municipality and part of Chhatarpur tehsil of the district.

Chhatarpur is part of Tikamgarh Lok Sabha constituency along with seven other Vidhan Sabha segments, namely, Maharajpur and Bijawar in this district and Jatara, Prithvipur, Niwari, Tikamgarh and Khargapur in Tikamgarh district.

== Members of Legislative Assembly ==
=== Vindhya Pradesh Legislative Assembly ===
Year	Member	Party
1952	Govind Das	Indian National Congress
1952	Panna Lal	Indian National Congress

=== Madhya Pradesh Legislative Assembly ===
Election	Name	Party
1957	Govind Das	Indian National Congress
1957	Dashrath	Indian National Congress
1962	Ram Swaroop	Bharatiya Jana Sangh
1967	Mahendra Kumar	Indian National Congress
1972	Mahendra Kumar	Indian National Congress
1977	Jagadamba Prasad Nigam	Janata Party
1980	Shankar Pratap Singh Bundela	Indian National Congress (Indira)
1985	Jagadamba Prasad Nigam	Janata Party
1990	Jagadamba Prasad Nigam	Janata Dal
1993	Shankar Pratap Singh Bundela	Indian National Congress
1998	Umesh Shukla	Bharatiya Janata Party
2003	Kunwar Vikram Singh	Samajwadi Party
2008	Lalita Yadav	Bharatiya Janata Party
2013	Lalita Yadav	Bharatiya Janata Party
2018	Alok Chaturvedi	Indian National Congress
2023	Lalita Yadav	Bharatiya Janata Party

== Election results ==
=== 2023 ===
2023 Madhya Pradesh Legislative Assembly election: Chhatarpur
Party	Candidate	Votes	%	±%
BJP	Lalita Yadav	77,687	45.38	+2.92
INC	Alok Chaturvedi	70,720	41.31	−3.53
BSP	Deelmani Singh	14,184	8.29	+2.04
AAP	Bhageerath Patel	2,321	1.36	
NOTA	None of the above	1,350	0.79	+0.27
Majority		6,967	4.07	+1.69
Turnout		171,197	73.82	+2.03
BJP gain from INC		Swing		

=== 2018 ===
2018 Madhya Pradesh Legislative Assembly election: Chhatarpur
Party	Candidate	Votes	%	±%
INC	Alok Chaturvedi	65,774	44.84	
BJP	Archna Guddu Singh	62,279	42.46	
BSP	Abdul Sameer	9,161	6.25	
Independent	Vinod Kumar Dubey	1,446	0.99	
NOTA	None of the above	762	0.52	
Majority		3,495	2.38	
Turnout		146,686	71.79	
INC gain from BJP		Swing		

== See also ==
- Chhatarpur
