= Gunour =

- Town
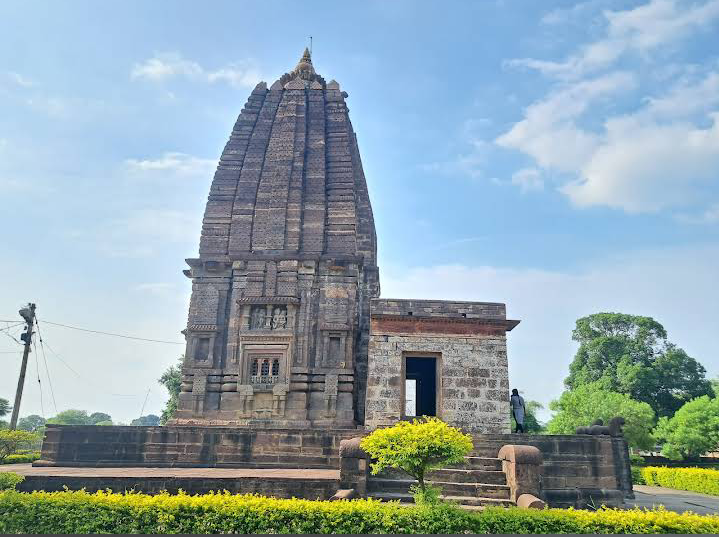
- Chaumukha Nath Temple Near Gunour

- Location in Madhya Pradesh, India
- Coordinates: 24.46°N 80.25°E
- Country: India
- State: Madhya Pradesh
- District: Panna

Government
  - Type: Nagar Panchayat
- Elevation: 406 m (1,332 ft)

Population (2011)
  - Total: 5,735
- Time zone: UTC+5:30 (IST)
- PINCODE: 488058
- Vehicle registration: MP 35

Gunour is a town and tehsil located in the Panna district, within the Madhya Pradesh state in central India. It's one of the 230 Vidhan Sabha (Legislative Assembly) constituencies of Madhya Pradesh state in central India.

== Geography ==
Gunour is located on 24.46°N 80.25°E. It has an average elevation of 406 metres (1332 ft). It's belongs to Sagar Division. 488058 is pin code of Gunour. Saleha is a other major town belongs to Gunour Tehsil.

== Population ==
The Gunaur village has population of 5,734 of which 2,939 are males while 2,795 are females as per Population Census 2011.

== Assembly constituency ==
Gunnaor Assembly constituency(constituency number 59) is one of the 3 Vidhan Sabha constituencies located in Panna district. This constituency covers the entire Gunour tehsil, Gunour, Devendranagar and Kakarhati nagar panchayats and part of Panna tehsil of the district.

== Major attractions ==
- Nachna Hindu temples - Nachna temples are variously dated to the 5th- or 6th-century Gupta Empire era. The Chaturmukha temple is dated to the 9th century.[4] These temples illustrate a North Indian style of Hindu temple architecture.
- Shreyanshgiri Jain Tirth - Shreyanshgiri is a major Jain Atishay Kshetra located near Saleha, it is a major confluence of natural environment and historical place. The temple is primarily dedicated to Lord Shreyanshnath, the 11th Tirthankara of Jainism.

== Transportation ==
Gunour is connected by roadways and bus service. 36 km away from District Headquarter Panna. It's connected with Pawai, Devendranagar and Kakarhati with roadways.
