= National Highway 339B (India) =

National highway in India

National Highway 339B
- Map of the National Highway in red

Route information
- Auxiliary route of NH 39
- Length: 30 km (19 mi)

Major junctions
- South end: Bamitha
- North end: khajwa

Location
- Country: India
- States: Madhya Pradesh

Highway system
- Roads in India; Expressways; National; State; Asian
← NH 39	→ NH 39

National Highway 339B, commonly referred to as NH 339B is a national highway in India. It is a spur road of National Highway 39. Bamitha to khajwa. NH-339B traverses the state of Madhya Pradesh in India.

== Route ==
Bamitha - Khajuraho - Rajnagar - Khajwa

== Junctions ==
NH 39 Terminal near Bamitha.

== See also ==
- List of national highways in India
- List of national highways in India by state
