= Pipat, Chhatarpur =

Pipat
- Village
- Location in Madhya Pradesh, India
- Coordinates: 24.940307°N 79.828166°E
- Country: India
- State: Madhya Pradesh
- District: Chhatarpur
- Tehsil: Rajnagar

Area
  - Total: 590 ha (1,500 acres)
- Elevation: 227 m (745 ft)

Population (2011)
  - Total: 2,769

Languages
  - Official: Hindi /Bundeli
- Time zone: UTC+5:30 (IST)
- ISO 3166 code: IN-MP
- Vehicle registration: MP16

Pipat is a village in Chhatarpur district, Madhya Pradesh. It is 23 km from Chhatarpur city, 15 km from Khajuraho, 10 km from Rajnagar and 18 km from khajwa town.

== Geography ==
Pipat is located at 24.940307°N 79.828166°E. It has an average elevation of 227 metres (744.751 and its area is 590 hectares.

== Demographics ==
At the 2011 census, Pipat had a population of 2,769.
