= Kutni Dam (Khajwa) =

- Kutni Dam in Khajwa, Madhya Pradesh, India Kutni Dam (India)
- Official name: Kutni Dam
- Country: India
- Location: Khajwa, Madhya Pradesh, India
- Coordinates: 24.9422348°N 79.9463930°E
- Purpose: Irrigation and water supply
- Construction began: 2009 or 2010
- Opening date: 2013 or 2014
- Operator: Water Resources Department Madhya Pradesh

Dam and spillways
- Impounds: Kutni river
- Height: 25 m (82 ft)

Reservoir
- Surface area: 18.2 km^{2}

Khajwa Kutni Dam is a multipurpose river canal project on Kutni river situated in Khajwa, Madhya Pradesh, India.It is the largest dam in Chhatarpur district.The dam across the Kutni river and it is 7 km from Rajnagar, 12 km from Khajuraho and 40 km from Chhatarpur District.The dam is famous for its beauty and vastness and Kutni island resor, hotel is located in Kutni dam khajwa town.

== Facilities ==
The dam is 25 metres high and lies across the Kutni River. It acts as an irrigation and water supply for villages, towns and cities in the area. There is a proposal to increase the supply of water available for irrigation by building a canal on the left bank of Bariarpur, drawing water from the Ken River. Kutni Island Resort Hotel in Khajwa is located on the small island of Kutni Dam.

== Kutni Dam Canal Project ==
The Kutni Dam canal project started in 2009 or 2010 and was completed and opened in 2013 or 2014.

== See also ==
List of reservoirs and dams in India
