= Rajnagar, Madhya Pradesh Assembly constituency =

Constituency of the Madhya Pradesh legislative assembly in India

Coordinates: 24.89°N 79.91°E

Rajnagar
- Constituency No. 50 for the Madhya Pradesh Legislative Assembly

Constituency details
- Country: India
- Region: Central India
- State: Madhya Pradesh
- District: Chhatarpur
- Lok Sabha constituency: Khajuraho
- Established: 1951
- Total electors: 217,008
- Reservation: None

Member of Legislative Assembly
- 16th Madhya Pradesh Legislative Assembly
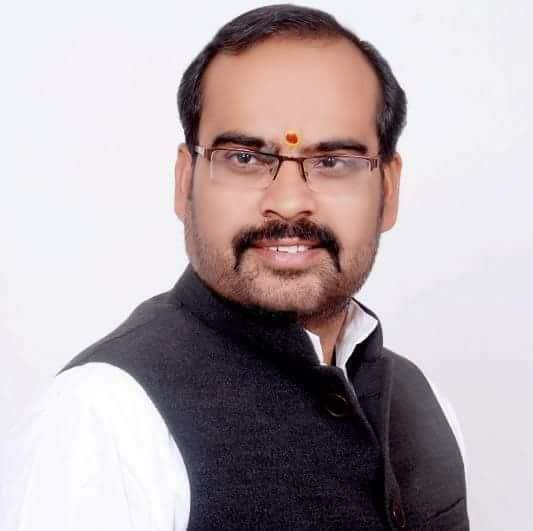
- Incumbent Arvind Pateriya
- Party: Bharatiya Janata Party
- Elected year: 2023
- Preceded by: Kunwar Vikram Singh

Rajnagar Assembly constituency is one of the 230 Vidhan Sabha (Legislative Assembly) constituencies of Madhya Pradesh state in central India. This constituency came into existence in 1951, as one of the 48 Vidhan Sabha constituencies of the erstwhile Vindhya Pradesh state but it was abolished in 1956. It came into existence again in 2008, following delimitation of legislative assembly constituencies.

== Overview ==
Rajnagar (constituency number 50) is one of the 6 Vidhan Sabha constituencies located in Chhatarpur district. This constituency covers the Khajuraho, Lavkush Nagar and Rajnagar nagar panchayats and parts of Lavkush Nagar and Rajnagar tehsils of the district.

Rajnagar is part of Khajuraho Lok Sabha constituency along with seven other Vidhan Sabha segments, namely, Chandla in this district, Pawai, Gunnaor and Panna in Panna district and Vijayraghavgarh, Murwara and Bahoriband in Katni district.

== Members of Legislative Assembly ==
=== As a constituency of Madhya Bharat ===
Election	Member	Party
1951	Gokul Prasad	Indian National Congress

=== As a constituency of Madhya Pradesh ===
Election	Member	Party
2008	Kunwar Vikram Singh	Indian National Congress
2013	Kunwar Vikram Singh	Indian National Congress
2018	Kunwar Vikram Singh	Indian National Congress
2023	Arvind Pateriya	Bharatiya Janata Party

== Election results ==
=== 2023 ===
2023 Madhya Pradesh Legislative Assembly election: Rajnagar
Party	Candidate	Votes	%	±%
BJP	Arvind Pateriya	69,698	38.14	+10.59
INC	Kunwar Vikram Singh	63,831	34.93	+6.87
BSP	Ghasiram Patel	32,195	17.62	−2.52
SP	Brajgopal Patel	6,353	3.48	−13.05
AAP	Raju Pal	1,729	0.95	
NOTA	None of the above	762	0.42	−1.31
Majority		5,867	3.21	+2.7
Turnout		182,762	72.98	+6.69
BJP gain from INC		Swing		

=== 2018 ===
2018 Madhya Pradesh Legislative Assembly election: Rajnagar
Party	Candidate	Votes	%	±%
INC	Kunwar Vikram Singh	40,362	28.06	
BJP	Arvind Pateriya	39,630	27.55	
BSP	Vinod Kumar Patel	28,972	20.14	
SP	Chaturvedi Nitin -	23,783	16.53	
Independent	Rahul Sureha	1,841	1.28	
NOTA	None of the above	2,485	1.73	
Majority		732	0.51	
Turnout		143,862	66.29	
INC hold		Swing		

=== 2013 ===
2013 Madhya Pradesh Legislative Assembly election: Rajnagar
Party	Candidate	Votes	%	±%
INC	Kunwar Vikram Singh (Nati Raja)	54,643	42.33	
BJP	Dr. Ramkrishn Kusmariya	46036	35.66	
BSP	Bala Ji Patel	14468	11.21	
SP	Dharmendra Singh Bundela	2957	2.29	
Independent	Rameshwar Prasad Mishra	2738	2.12	
Independent	Mahant Ramnaresh Das	1744	1.35	
Independent	Kurmi Ramprasad	961	0.74	
Independent	Rajesh Kumar	683	0.53	
Independent	Khare Neeraj	560	0.43	
Independent	Agnihotri Kamlapat	426	0.33	
Independent	Imran	390	0.30	
Independent	Ahirwar Brijesh Kumar	365	0.28	
NOTA	None of the Above	3129	2.42	
Majority				
Turnout		129100	64.40	
INC hold		Swing		

== See also ==
- Laundi
- Khajuraho
- Rajnagar
