= Prahlad Lodhi =

Indian politician

Member of Madhya Pradesh Legislative Assembly
- Incumbent
- Assumed office 2018
- Preceded by: Mukesh Nayak
- Constituency: Pawai

Personal details
- Political party: Bharatiya Janata Party
- Profession: Politician

Prahlad Lodhi is an Indian politician from Madhya Pradesh. He is a two time elected Member of the Madhya Pradesh Legislative Assembly from 2018 and 2023, representing Pawai Assembly constituency as a Member of the Bharatiya Janata Party.

== Political career ==
In the 2018 Madhya Pradesh Legislative Assembly elections, Lodhi was nominated by the Bharatiya Janata Party to contest from the Pawai Assembly constituency. He competed against the Indian National Congress candidate, Pandit Mukesh Nayak, and won by a margin of 23,680 votes, securing a total of 79,647 votes compared to Nayak's 55,967 votes.

In the last 2023 Madhya Pradesh Assembly elections, Lodhi again received the BJP nomination for the Pawai constituency and once more faced INC's candidate Nayak. Lodhi retained his seat with a margin of 22,043 votes, obtaining 106,411 votes against Nayak's 84,368 votes.

== See also ==
- 2023 Madhya Pradesh Legislative Assembly election
- Madhya Pradesh Legislative Assembly
