= Lalita Yadav =

Indian state politician

Member of the 16th Madhya Pradesh Assembly
- Incumbent
- Assumed office 2023
- Preceded by: Alok Chaturvedi
- Constituency: Chhatarpur
- In office 2008–2018
- Preceded by: Vikram Singh
- Succeeded by: Alok Chaturvedi

Personal details
- Political party: Bhartiya Janta Party
- Occupation: Politician

Lalita Yadav (born 22 April 1961) is a member of the Madhya Pradesh Legislative Assembly in India. She was elected from Chhatarpur seat in the 2008 Madhya Pradesh Legislative Assembly elections. In 2018 election she fought her election from Badamalhara seat and was runner up in the election but she managed to get her ticket from Chhatarpur back in 2023 and won the election and she is now serving as a MLA of Chhatarpur. She belongs to the Bharatiya Janata Party (BJP).

From 1997 to 2004 she was district president of BJP Mahila Morcha, and from 2000 to 2004 president of the municipal council of Chhatarpur. In 2007–08 she was a member of the Bundelkhand Development Authority Sagar. In 2007 she was vice president MP BJP Mahila Morcha.

In June 2018, she was reported to have organized a wedding ceremony between two frogs in order to appease the rain gods. This was attended by hundreds of people, further encouraging this superstition.

Preceded by Kunwar Vikram Singh	MLA of MP for Chhatarpur Seat; 2008-till date	Succeeded by incumbent
