= Saleha, Madhya Pradesh =

Village in Madhya Pradesh, India

Saleha
- Town
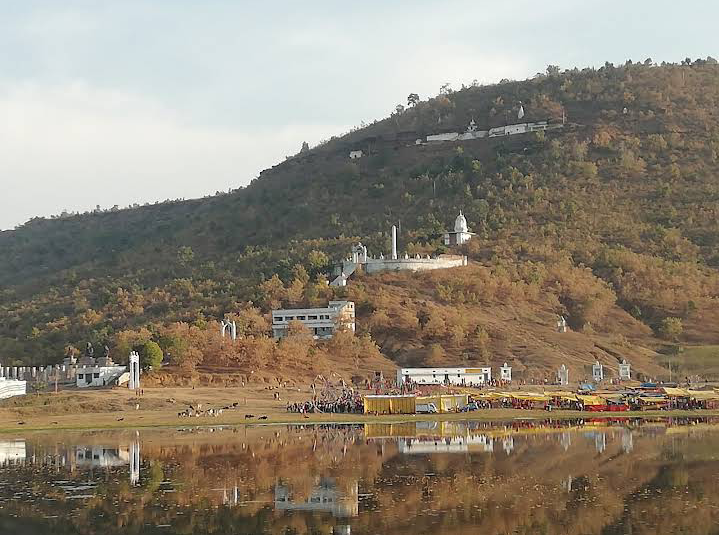
- Shreyansh Giri Jain Tirth Near Saleha

- Location in Madhya Pradesh, India
- Coordinates: 24.53°N 80.24°E
- Country: India
- State: Madhya Pradesh
- District: Panna

Saleha is a town in Gunour Tehsil of Panna District of the Indian state of Madhya Pradesh. Shreyanshgiri and Nachna Kuthara is a major nearby attraction.

== Demographics ==
As per Census of India 2011, Saleha Town has a population of 3,748 with 1,925 males and 1,823 females.

== Culture ==
Nachna Hindu temples in the town are dated to the 5th- or 6th-century Gupta Empire era. The Chaturmukha temple dates to the 9th century. These temples illustrate a North Indian style of Hindu temple architecture.

== Transportation ==
Saleha is connected to Nagod, Satna, Pawai and Panna.
