= Kunwar Vikram Singh =

Indian politician

Member of the Madhya Pradesh Legislative Assembly
- In office 2008–2018
- Preceded by: Gokal Prasad
- Constituency: Rajnagar

Personal details
- Born: 26 December 1970 (age 55)
- Party: Indian National Congress
- Spouse: Kavita Singh
- Education: B.Sc.
- Profession: Politician

Kunwar Vikram Singh alias Nati Raja belongs to Chhatarpur royal family. He is a member of the Madhya Pradesh Legislative Assembly, elected from the newly formed constituency of Rajnagar, in Madhya Pradesh, India in 2008. He fought election from Indian National Congress. He won this seat once again against Shankar Pratap Singh Bundela, who was the Bahujan Samaj Party (BSP) candidate instead of Indian National Congress (INC).

In 2003 Assembly Election Vikram Singh, alias Nati Raja, was the SP candidate for Chhatarpur constituency. In this election he defeated Shankar Pratap Singh Bundela of INC.

Preceded by Umesh Shukla	MLA of Madhya Pradesh for Chhatarpur Seat; 2003-2008	Succeeded by Lalita Yadav
Preceded by Newly formed Seat	MLA of Madhya Pradesh for Rajnagar; 2008-till date	Succeeded by Arvind pateria
