= Jagadamba Prasad Nigam =

Socialist leader from Chhatarpur, Madhya Pradesh (1928–2022)

Jagdamba Prasad Nigam (20 February 1928 – 14 May 2022) was a socialist leader from Chhatarpur, Madhya Pradesh. He was three times MLA from Chhatarpur, Madhya Pradesh Assembly constituency. Nigam started his career after obtaining the degree of BA and LLB. He was elected in 1977 and 1985 as a Janata Party candidate. In 1990, he was elected as a Janata Dal candidate. He died on 14 May 2022, at his hometown.
