= Shankar Pratap Singh Bundela =

Indian politician

- Born: 30 September 1951 (age 74); Chhatarpur, Madhya Pradesh
- Other name: Munna Raja
- Citizenship: Indian
- Occupations: Politician farmer
- Known for: public welfare
- Predecessor: Jagdamba Prasad Nigam
- Successor: Umesh Shukla
- Political party: Bjp
- Spouse: Vijayshree Bundela
- Children: Siddhartha, Abhilasha, Aditya

Shankar Pratap Singh Bundela belongs to village Basari block Rajnagar, which was his former Estate under Madhya Pradesh. He is popularly known as Munna Raja.

== Political career ==
He joined the Indian National Congress Party in the year 1972 and has been a member ever since. Elected from Chhatarpur, Madhya Pradesh, he has been a Member of Madhya Pradesh Legislative Assembly twice. From the year 1980 to 1985 and 1993 to 1998. He went on to become the president of M.P. State Cooperative Agriculture and Rural Development Bank in 1997 and again in the year 2002. In 2003, he became the Vice-President of National Co-operative Bank Federation, New Delhi. Contested Madhya Pradesh Legislative Assembly Election 2008 from Rajnagar Constituency of Madhya Pradesh with Bahujan Samaj Party.

== Social life ==
Since 1997, he has been continuously organising 'Bundeli Festival' (known as Bundeli Utsav) at village Basari to preserve and promote Bundelkhand's Culture and Tradition.

== Sources ==
- item no.49
- http://www.rediff.com/election/2003/nov/01mp1.htm
- Oneindia
- https://web.archive.org/web/20090218153220/http://archive.eci.gov.in/nov2003/pollupd/ac/candlwc/S12/S12INCAcnst.htm
- http://archive.eci.gov.in/Nov2003/pollupd/ac/states/s12/Partycomp49.htm
- https://web.archive.org/web/20081109072215/http://www.aicc.org.in/home-layout.php?id=62

Preceded by Jagdamba Prasad Nigam	MLA of MP for Chhatarpur Seat; 1980–1985	Succeeded by Jagdamba Prasad Nigam
Preceded by Jagdamba Prasad Nigam	MLA of MP for Chhatarpur Seat; 1993–1998	Succeeded by Umesh Shukla
