= Gunnaor Assembly constituency =

Constituency of the Madhya Pradesh legislative assembly in India

Coordinates: 24.46°N 80.25°E

Gunnaor
- Constituency No. 59 for the Madhya Pradesh Legislative Assembly

Constituency details
- Country: India
- Region: Central India
- State: Madhya Pradesh
- District: Panna
- Lok Sabha constituency: Khajuraho
- Established: 2008
- Reservation: SC

Member of Legislative Assembly
- 16th Madhya Pradesh Legislative Assembly
- Incumbent Rajesh Kumar Verma
- Party: Bhartiya Janata Party
- Elected year: 2023
- Preceded by: Shivdayal Bagri

Gunnaor is one of the 230 Vidhan Sabha (Legislative Assembly) constituencies of Madhya Pradesh state in central India. This constituency came into existence in 2008, following the delimitation of the legislative assembly constituencies and presently reserved for the candidates belonging to the Scheduled castes.

== Overview ==
Gunnaor (constituency number 59) is one of the 3 Vidhan Sabha constituencies located in Panna district. This constituency covers the entire Gunnaor tehsil, Devendranagar and Kakarhati nagar panchayats and part of Panna tehsil of the district.

Gunnaor is part of Khajuraho Lok Sabha constituency along with seven other Vidhan Sabha segments, namely, Panna and Pawai in this district, Chandla and Rajnagar in Chhatarpur district and Vijayraghavgarh, Murwara and Bahoriband in Katni district.

== Members of the Legislative Assembly ==
- 2008: Rajesh Kumar Verma, Bharatiya Janata Party
- 2013: Mahendra Bagri, Bharatiya Janata Party

Election	Name	Party
2008	Rajesh Kumar Verma	Bharatiya Janata Party
2013	Mahendra Bagri	Bharatiya Janata Party
2018	Shivdayal Bagri	Indian National Congress
2023	Rajesh Kumar Verma	Bharatiya Janata Party

== Election results ==
=== 2023 ===
2023 Madhya Pradesh Legislative Assembly election: Gunnaor
Party	Candidate	Votes	%	±%
BJP	Rajesh Kumar Verma	77,196	45.89	+9.63
INC	Jeevan Lal Siddharth	76,036	45.2	+7.65
BSP	Devideen 'Ashu'	5,946	3.53	−17.83
SP	Amita Bagri	3,892	2.31	
NOTA	None of the above	2,012	1.2	−1.23
Majority		1,160	0.69	−0.6
Turnout		168,207	72.43	+0.08
BJP gain from INC		Swing		

=== 2018 ===
2018 Madhya Pradesh Legislative Assembly election: Gunnaor
Party	Candidate	Votes	%	±%
INC	Shivdayal Bagri	57,658	37.55	
BJP	Rajesh Kumar Verma	55,674	36.26	
BSP	Jeevanlal Siddharth	32,793	21.36	
Sapaks Party	Khilawan Prasad Urf Khillu	3,700	2.41	
NOTA	None of the above	3,734	2.43	
Majority		1,984	1.29	
Turnout		153,559	72.35	
INC gain from		Swing		

== See also ==
- Devendranagar
- Kakarhati
