= Asha Rani (politician) =

Indian politician

Asha Rani is an Indian politician affiliated to the Bharatiya Janata Party. She was a member of the Madhya Pradesh Legislative Assembly in India until her conviction on charges of abduction a woman who worked as her family's maid and abetment in her death by burning.

She was elected from Bijawar of Madhya Pradesh seat in the 2008 state assembly elections.

== Tijji Bai abduction and death ==
Her husband Ashok Veer Vikram Singh, a former Samajwadi Party member of the state assembly and a strongarm politician, had abducted Tijji and brought her to Bhopal where she became a bonded labourer.

In 2007, Tijji Bai set herself aflame. The incident became well known when neighbours saw her in flames, but instead of running around she was sitting quietly. Though a charge was registered, it was not followed up.

In May 2013, her husband was convicted in a murder case. Subsequently, the Tijji-Bai case was investigated, and Asha Rani was charged. She then went into hiding for several months. When she was about to lose her state assembly seat for missing sessions for 60 days, she emerged to attend the assembly and was arrested. She was convicted in 2013 and sentenced to ten years in jail. She was disqualified as a member of the legislative assembly under the provisions of the Representation of the People Act which disqualifies those who has been convicted under certain laws. She was the first legislator from the state and the first female legislator in the country to be disqualified under the law.
