= Bundeli Utsav =

Indian folk arts festival held annually in springtime

Bundeli Utsav (Bundeli Festival) is a cultural festival to promote the Bundeli (Bundelkhandi) folk arts, held in village Basari, tehsil Rajnagar, District Chhatarpur, Madhya Pradesh, India, every year during the spring season for seven days starting from Basant Panchmi. It is organized by Bundeli Vikas Sansthan, an NGO with a mission to performs various social activities and promote Bundeli culture, with the help of Government of Madhya Pradesh's Department of Culture and Madhya Pradesh State Tourism Development Corporation. Various competitions on folk arts, folk dances, folk songs, food festival, traditional games and archery events are organized during this festival. A large number of participants from eight districts of Madhya Pradesh (Chhatarpur, Datia, Damoh, Katni, Narsinghpur, Panna, Sagar, Shivpuri and Tikamgarh) and five districts of Uttar Pradesh (Banda, Hamirpur, Jalaun, Jhansi and Lalitpur) [Mahoba] take part in these competitions.

The folk arts of Bundelkhand are very special. These folk arts include songs, dance, painting, and handcrafted items. The people of Bundelkhand express their emotions through folk songs and dances. Folk dances like ‘Diwari’ are very popular here. These arts clearly reflect the culture and traditions of Bundelkhand.

A few of the most famous folk arts showcased by Bundeli Utsav are described below.

== Folk dances ==
- Diwari in Bundelkhand is performed every year during the festival of light Diwali/Deepawali in the end of October or first week of November according to lunar calendar. In this connection the epic story goes that "in Gokul" when Lord Krishna raised Goverdhan Mountain on his finger to save his associates (milkmen), they danced in joy. The dancers wear multi-coloured apparels and the chief dancer holds the peacock feathers in his hands and the rest stick those feathers in their half pants. The main instruments used in this dance are ‘Dholak’ and ‘Nagaria’ (both being a form of drums). The male dancers with long sticks show the marshal arts when the beats of drums inspire their energy and emotions. This dance is also performed as a ‘thanks giving’ after harvesting.
- Ravala dance in Bundelkhand is basically a dance drama. The farm labour community of Bundelkhand performs Ravala during marriages. It is performed with very funny expressions and humorous dialogues. The audiences are entertained by these expressions of dance and the dialogues of drama.
- Badhaiya is a ceremonial dance. It is performed on child birth, marriages or any other child social get together to celebrate happiness and joy. The collective moments of dancers show the unique expressions of their faces. With rhythm and movements they greet for the occasion.
- Raai – Through the centuries Raai has been the folk dance which has touched its peak as a classical dance. Later Raai had degenerated its aesthetical values and lost its classical expressions. Today it remains simply as a folk dance. Raai means a mustard seed. When a mustard seed is thrown into a saucer, the seed starts to swings around. The way mustard seed moves in the saucer, the dancers also swings and when the singers sing the lyrics of the song the dancers follow the beats with foot steps. It is a duet and the competition is between the beats of the drum and foot steps of the dancer. The drummer and the dancer try to win each other and this competition leads towards the bliss.
- Horse Dance a ceremonial dance performed by a trained horse with the loud beats of heave drums called Rabbi. With graceful movements, the horse follows beats of the drum with its four steps and the horse rider performs the gymnastics gestures. Typically horse dance follows the ceremonial marriage processions.

== Folk music ==
- Faag songs and its rhythmic music could be heard in the whole Bundelkhand region during spring season when the crops are ready for harvesting. The spring season of March–April express the vibrant emotions which are hidden in the tender hearts of the youth, invites them to come close to fell each other and to express the mystical attachment between male and female. Finally emotions are transformed into devotion to make devotee divine.
- Alha reciting is always organized to entertain the farmers during monsoon. When farmers are free from their agricultural jobs during heavy monsoon and they cannot move anywhere, sitting at one place Alha recital makes their emotions awake through the description of heroic deeds of their historical heroes.
- Dadre and Gari is the main folk lore of Bundelkhand. As a ‘Gari’ they show the happiness and joy to express their feeling for the blissful movement when the auspicious marriage is taking place. They evoke the feelings in the heart of bride and groom with love and romance. ‘Dadre’ is sung by a group of ladies to bless the newly wed couple.
- Lamtera – (Call of God) Lamtera songs are sung by Bundeli pilgrims during devotional festivals of Bundelkhand in the month of January, February and March after rabi crop in winter blossoms. Farmers after seeing their crops flowering, their hearts and minds also bloom like a flower. To show their gratitude to the God, the devotees offer the flowers of their emotions to the lotus feet of the God. They realize that the whole year passed in day-to-day life, and with the feeling of spring season they want to get blessed by going to the pilgrimage places, temples and to take the holy bath in the rivers.
- Khyal – In ‘Khyal Gayaki’, a singer recites mythical stories, heroic deeds, the social events and the deep family relations. In this expression of songs, a very special drum ‘Dhapli’ gives very special beats which harmonize emotions.
- Kaharwa – In the expression of folk lore Kaharwa, the sentiments of heart culminate into the romantic expression. This song is always sung by a drummer who follows the dancer of Raai, which is why this dance is also known as Raai-Kaharwa.
