= Panna Assembly constituency =

Assembly constituency in Madhya Pradesh

Coordinates: 24.71°N 80.18°E

Panna
- Constituency No. 60 for the Madhya Pradesh Legislative Assembly

Constituency details
- Country: India
- Region: Central India
- State: Madhya Pradesh
- District: Panna
- Lok Sabha constituency: Khajuraho
- Established: 1951
- Reservation: None

Member of Legislative Assembly
- 16th Madhya Pradesh Legislative Assembly
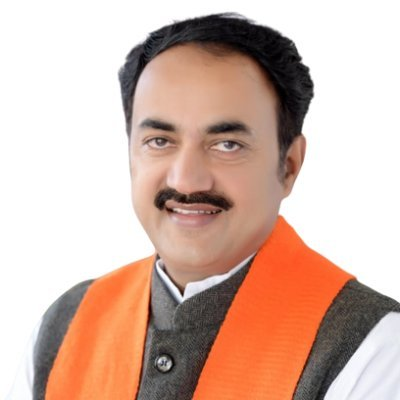
- Incumbent Brijendra Pratap Singh
- Party: Bharatiya Janata Party
- Elected year: 2023
- Preceded by: Kusum Mehdele

Panna Assembly constituency is one of the 230 Vidhan Sabha (Legislative Assembly) constituencies of Madhya Pradesh state in central India. This constituency came into existence in 1951 as one of the 48 Vidhan Sabha constituencies of the erstwhile Vindhya Pradesh state.

== Overview ==
Panna (constituency number 60) is one of the 3 Vidhan Sabha constituencies located in Panna district. This constituency covers the entire Ajaigarh tehsil, Panna municipality and part of Panna tehsil of the district.

Panna is part of Khajuraho Lok Sabha constituency along with seven other Vidhan Sabha segments, namely, Gunnaor and Pawai in this district, Chandla and Rajnagar in Chhatarpur district and Vijayraghavgarh, Murwara and Bahoriband in Katni district.

== Members of Legislative Assembly ==
=== Vindhya Pradesh Legislative Assembly ===
Year	Member	Party
1952	Saryu Prasad Chanpuriya	Indian National Congress

=== Madhya Pradesh Legislative Assembly ===
Election	Name	Party
1957	Devendra Vijay Singh	Independent politician
1962	Narendra Singh Judeo	Indian National Congress
1967	Het Ram Dubey	Indian National Congress
1972	Het Ram Dubey	Indian National Congress
1977	Lokendra Singh Judeo	Janata Party
1980	Het Ram Dubey	Indian National Congress (Indira)
1985	Jai Prakash Patel	Bharatiya Janata Party
1990	Kusum Mehdele	Bharatiya Janata Party
1993	Lokendra Singh Judeo	Indian National Congress
1998	Kusum Mehdele	Bharatiya Janata Party
2003	Kusum Mehdele	Bharatiya Janata Party
2008	Shrikant Dubey	Indian National Congress
2013	Kusum Mehdele	Bharatiya Janata Party
2018	Brijendra Pratap Singh	Bharatiya Janata Party
2023	Brijendra Pratap Singh	Bharatiya Janata Party

== Election results ==
=== 2023 ===
2023 Madhya Pradesh Legislative Assembly election: Panna
Party	Candidate	Votes	%	±%
BJP	Brijendra Pratap Singh	96,668	51.15	+10.94
INC	Bharat Milan Pandey	78,758	41.67	+13.64
SP	Lodhi Mahendra Pal Verma	2,877	1.52	−0.42
BSP	Vimla Ahirwar	2,855	1.51	−11.91
NOTA	None of the above	2,364	1.25	+0.85
Majority		17,910	9.48	−2.7
Turnout		188,993	75.33	+1.31
BJP hold		Swing		

=== 2018 ===
2018 Madhya Pradesh Legislative Assembly election: Panna
Party	Candidate	Votes	%	±%
BJP	Brijendra Pratap Singh	68,359	40.21	
INC	Shivjeet Singh	47,651	28.03	
BSP	Anupama Charan Singh Yadav	22,818	13.42	
Jan Adhikar Party	Lodhi Mahendra Pal Verma	10,973	6.46	
SP	Pahalwan Dasrath Singh Yadav	3,291	1.94	
Independent	Ram Bhagat Patel	3,253	1.91	
Sapaks Party	Shaligram Pandey	1,743	1.03	
Independent	Ram Bihari Goswami Patrkar	1,734	1.02	
Independent	Udaya Aatmanand Ji	1,590	0.94	
NOTA	None of the above	680	0.4	
Majority		20,708	12.18	
Turnout		169,989	74.02	
BJP gain from		Swing		

== See also ==
- Panna
