= Shreyansh Giri =

Coordinates: 24.393°N 80.449°E

- श्रेयांश गिरि
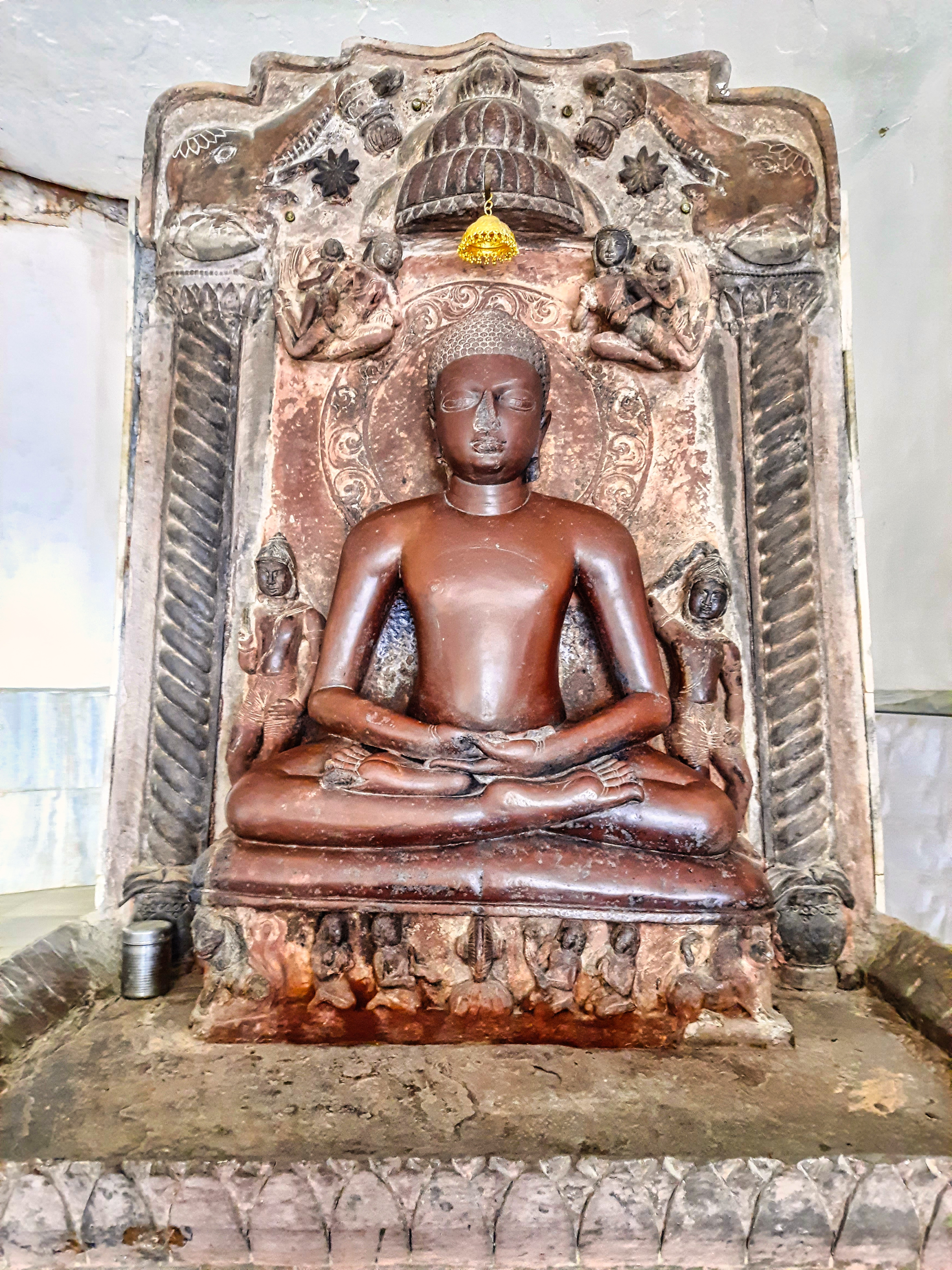
- Neminatha idol at Shreyansh Giri

Religion
- Affiliation: Jainism
- Sect: Digambara
- Deity: Shreyansanatha

Location
- Location: Nachna, Panna district

Architecture
- Style: Gupta architecture
- Creator: Gupta Empire
- Established: 5th century

Shreyansh Giri is a Jain religious and archaeological site at Nachna (also known as Kachhgawan) in Panna district, Madhya Pradesh, India. The site is located on a hill traditionally known as Siddh-ka-Pahar and contains Jain sculptures and rock-cut remains. The Jain remains at Nachna are significant for the study of early Jain art in central India, particularly because several Tirthankara images from the site have been dated to the Gupta period.

== History ==
Nachna is an important archaeological site containing monuments and sculptures dating from the Gupta and post-Gupta periods. The site is particularly known for its early Hindu temples, but it has also yielded a substantial group of Jain sculptures. More than a dozen Jain Tirthankara images have been found at Nachna and its surrounding archaeological area. Their presence indicates that the settlement was an important centre of Jain activity during the Gupta period.

The Jain sculptures include images of Tirthankaras in the seated padmāsana posture. Art historian Joanna Gottfried Williams identified a group of the Jain images from Nachna as works of the later fifth century CE and noted stylistic similarities with sculpture associated with the Sanchi region. Some of the Jain sculptures were found on the hill now known as Siddh-ka-Pahar, identified with present-day Shreyansh Giri. Jain images were installed in caves and rock-cut shelters on the hill.

== Jain sculptures ==
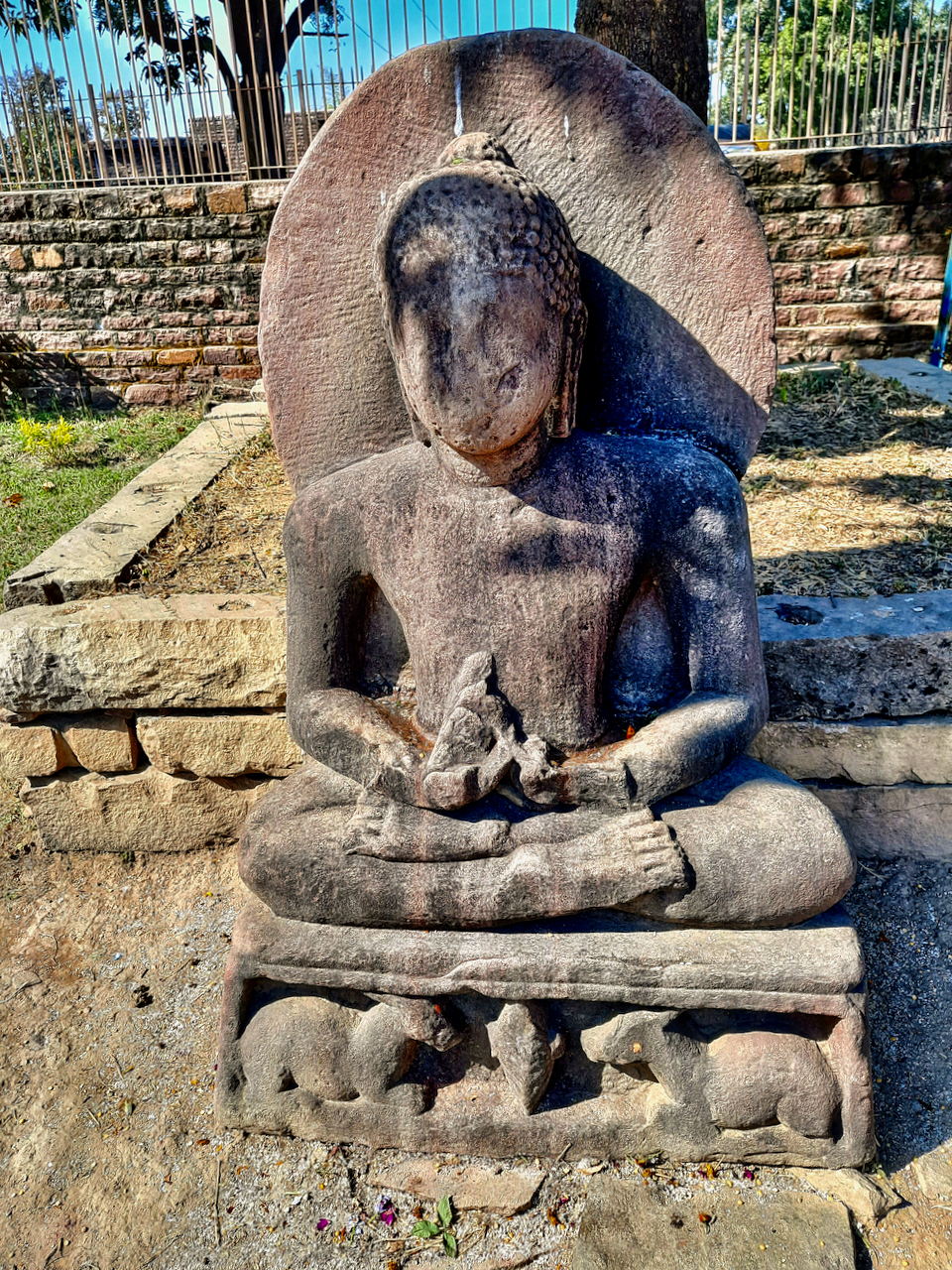
Neminatha statue (c. 475 CE), in Buddha style

One of the important sculptures associated with Shreyansh Giri is an image of Neminatha, the 22nd Tirthankara. The sculpture has been dated to approximately the fifth century CE. The Neminatha image is notable for its strongly frontal treatment and relatively simple bodily modelling. Its appearance has been compared with contemporary Buddha images, reflecting the shared artistic vocabulary of Buddhist and Jain sculpture in central India during the Gupta period.

Another group of Jain images includes representations of Parshvanatha, the 23rd Tirthankara. Several Jain sculptures originally found in the Nachna area are now preserved in museums, while replicas and reconstructed images remain at or near the original archaeological locations. The dispersal of the sculptures has resulted from their removal for protection and museum display.

== Siddh-ka-Pahar caves ==
The hill known as Siddh-ka-Pahar contains rock-cut caves and shelters associated with the Jain remains of Nachna. Jain Tirthankara images and reliefs were found in and around these caves. The caves and sculptures demonstrate that Jain religious activity existed alongside Hindu religious establishments at Nachna. The archaeological remains therefore provide evidence for the coexistence of Jain and Brahmanical religious traditions at the site during the Gupta and post-Gupta periods.

The modern temple should be distinguished from the ancient Jain archaeological remains of Nachna. The surviving Gupta-period sculptures and the rock-cut remains on Siddh-ka-Pahar are considerably older than the present temple construction.

== Archaeological significance ==
The Jain remains of Shreyansh Giri form part of the wider Nachna-Kachhgawan archaeological complex, which contains important monuments and sculptures from the Gupta period. The Jain images are particularly significant because relatively few securely datable Jain sculptures from the fifth century have survived in central India. The Nachna sculptures also contribute to the study of the development of Jain iconography. The identification of Tirthankaras during this period was not always expressed through the fully developed iconographic conventions of later Jain art, and the Nachna images illustrate an early stage in the standardisation of Jain imagery.

== See also ==
- Pataini temple
- Nachna Hindu temples
- Gupta Empire
- Kahaum pillar
