= Kusum Mehdele =

Indian politician

Minister of Public Health Engineering & Jail, Madhya Pradesh Government
- In office 21 December 2013 – 2018
- Chief Minister: Shivraj Singh Chouhan
- Succeeded by: Bala Bachchan, Sukhdev Panse

Member of Legislative Assembly, Madhya Pradesh
- In office 2013–2018
- Succeeded by: Brijendra Pratap Singh
- Constituency: Panna
- In office 1998–2008
- Succeeded by: Shrikant Dubey
- Constituency: Panna

Personal details
- Born: 15 August 1943 (age 82)
- Party: Bharatiya Janata Party
- Education: B.Sc, LL.B.
- Profession: Lawyer

Kusum Mehdele (born 15 August 1943) is an Indian politician who is cabinet minister in Government of Madhya Pradesh. She is a leader of the Bharatiya Janata Party and is elected to the assembly from the Panna constituency. She was a Bharatiya Janata Mahila Morcha thrice from 1984 to 1990 as well as Vice-President of Madhya Pradesh Bharatiya Janata Party twice in 1984-86 and 1995–96.

In 2005, she was inducted in Babulal Gaur’s cabinet a Minister for Women & Child Development and Revenue and retained her position in the Shivraj Singh Chouhan' cabinet as well.
