= Mukesh Nayak =

Indian politician

Member of the Madhya Pradesh Legislative Assembly
- Incumbent
- Assumed office 2013
- Preceded by: Brijendra Pratap Singh
- Constituency: Pawai
- In office 1993–1998
- Preceded by: Ashok Veer Vikram Singh
- Succeeded by: Ashok Veer Vikram Singh
- In office 1985–1990
- Preceded by: Chandranarayan Ramdhan
- Succeeded by: Jayant Malaiya
- Constituency: Damoh

Personal details
- Born: 16 June 1957 (age 68) Mandla, Madhya Pradesh
- Party: Indian National Congress
- Education: PhD
- Profession: Politician
- As of 28 July, 2018 Source: ["Biography: Mukesh Nayak" (PDF). Madhya Pradesh Legislative Assembly.]

Mukesh Nayak is an Indian politician from Madhya Pradesh and a member of the Indian National Congress.

== Political career ==
He became an MLA in 2013.

== Personal life ==
He is married to Shashi Kiran Nayak. They have a son and a daughter.

== See also ==
- Madhya Pradesh Legislative Assembly
- 2013 Madhya Pradesh Legislative Assembly election
- 1993 Madhya Pradesh Legislative Assembly election
- 1985 Madhya Pradesh Legislative Assembly election
