= Arvind Pateriya =

Indian politician

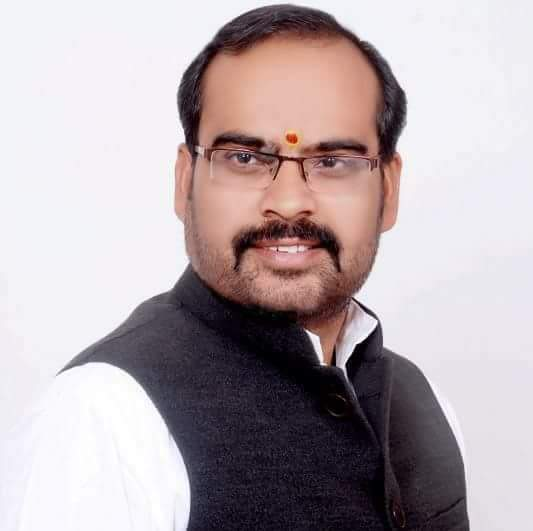

Arvind Pateriya

Arvind Pateriya (born April 15, 1981) is an Indian politician who currently serves as a Member of the Legislative Assembly (MLA) in Madhya Pradesh, representing the interests of his constituency since 2023. He is affiliated with the Bharatiya Janata Party (BJP) and is known for his active involvement in grassroots politics, particularly in addressing the challenges faced by the people of Chhatarpur district.

Early Life and Education

Arvind Pateriya was born on April 15, 1981, and spent his childhood in Chhatarpur, Madhya Pradesh, India. Along with his brother, Mr. Devendra Pateriya, he moved to Chhatarpur during his childhood years. Witnessing the difficulties faced by the villagers, including harassment and exploitation by powerful figures such as college authorities and politicians, deeply influenced Pateriya's decision to enter politics and serve his community.

Political Career

Arvind Pateriya joined the Bharatiya Janata Party (BJP) and became an active member of the Rashtriya Swayamsevak Sangh (RSS), a Hindu nationalist organization, early in his life. During his college years, he was associated with the Akhil Bharatiya Vidyarthi Parishad (ABVP), the student wing of the RSS.

Pateriya held significant positions within the BJP's organizational structure. He served as the Jila Adhyaksh (district president) of the Yuva Morcha, the youth wing of the BJP, in Chhatarpur district for more than seven years.

In 2018, Arvind Pateriya contested his first electoral battle, seeking to represent the interests of his constituency. He was initially defeated by the Congress MLA of Rajnagar, Vikram Singh. He won in subsequent elections, securing a seat in the Madhya Pradesh Legislative Assembly.

Contributions and Achievements

As a Member of the Legislative Assembly, Arvind Pateriya has been actively involved in various initiatives aimed at improving infrastructure, healthcare, education, and overall socio-economic development in Chhatarpur and surrounding areas.

District Minister

Arvind Pateriya has also served as a District Minister, playing a crucial role in local governance and administration.

Personal Life

His father name is MR.Raghuvar dayal pateriya and mother name is Mrs kapoori devi pateriya

spouse - Priyanka Tripathi

Outside of his political endeavors, Arvind Pateriya enjoys spending time with his family and engaging in social activities.
