= Pawai Assembly constituency =

Constituency of the Madhya Pradesh legislative assembly in India

Coordinates: 24.27°N 80.18°E

Pawai
- Constituency No. 58 for the Madhya Pradesh Legislative Assembly

Constituency details
- Country: India
- Region: Central India
- State: Madhya Pradesh
- District: Panna
- Lok Sabha constituency: Khajuraho
- Established: 1951
- Reservation: None

Member of Legislative Assembly
- 16th Madhya Pradesh Legislative Assembly
- Incumbent Prahlad Lodhi
- Party: Bharatiya Janata Party
- Elected year: 2023
- Preceded by: Mukesh Nayak

Pawai Assembly constituency is one of the 230 Vidhan Sabha (Legislative Assembly) constituencies of Madhya Pradesh state in central India. This constituency came into existence in 1951 as one of the 48 Vidhan Sabha constituencies of the erstwhile Vindhya Pradesh state.

== Overview ==
Pawai (constituency number 58) is one of the 3 Vidhan Sabha constituencies located in Panna district. This constituency covers the entire Pawai and Shahnagar tehsils of the district.

Pawai is part of Khajuraho Lok Sabha constituency along with seven other Vidhan Sabha segments, namely, Gunnaor and Panna in this district, Chandla and Rajnagar in Chhatarpur district and Vijayraghavgarh, Murwara and Bahoriband in Katni district.

Electors	No.
Male	1,35,041
Female	1,21,886
Total	2,56,929

== Members of Legislative Assembly ==
=== As a constituency of Madhya Bharat ===
- 1951: Bhura, Indian National Congress / Narendra Singh, Indian National Congress

=== As a constituency of Madhya Pradesh ===
Election	Name	Party
1957	Narendra Singh Judeo	Indian National Congress
1962	Jagsuriya	Indian National Congress
1967	Ram Sewak Patel	Bharatiya Jana Sangh
1972	Jagdish Singh	Indian National Congress
1977	Uma Shankar	Janata Party
1980	Jaipal Singh	Indian National Congress
1985	Jaipal Singh	Indian National Congress
1990	Ashok Veer Vikram Singh	Independent
1993	Mukesh Nayak	Indian National Congress
1998	Ashok Veer Vikram Singh	Samajwadi Party
2003	Brijendra Pratap Singh	Bharatiya Janata Party
2008	Brijendra Pratap Singh	Bharatiya Janshakti Party
2013	Mukesh Nayak	Indian National Congress
2018	Prahlad Lodhi	Bharatiya Janata Party
2023	Prahlad Lodhi	Bharatiya Janata Party

== Election results ==
=== 2023 ===
2023 Madhya Pradesh Legislative Assembly election: Pawai
Party	Candidate	Votes	%	±%
BJP	Prahlad Lodhi	106,411	49.76	+9.93
INC	Mukesh Nayak	84,368	39.45	+11.46
Bhartiya Ganrajya Party	Rampal Singh Gondela	4,109	1.92	
Independent	Hari Lal Choudhary Retired T.I.	3,387	1.58	
BSP	Hemant Rishiraj Singh	3,314	1.55	−5.64
SP	Rajani Yadav	2,896	1.35	−9.84
NOTA	None of the above	2,498	1.17	−0.72
Majority		22,043	10.31	−1.53
Turnout		213,842	75.81	−2.02
BJP hold		Swing		

=== 2018 ===
2018 Madhya Pradesh Legislative Assembly election: Pawai
Party	Candidate	Votes	%	±%
BJP	Prahlad Lodhi	79,647	39.83	
INC	Mukesh Nayak	55,967	27.99	
SP	Bhuwan Vikram Singh (Keshu Bhaiya Raja)	22,384	11.19	
BSP	Advocate Sita Ram Patel	14,381	7.19	
GGP	Mahipal Singh	9,913	4.96	
AAP	Anil Tiwari	3,846	1.92	
Independent	Mansukh Lal	2,275	1.14	
Independent	P. Mukesh	1,863	0.93	
NOTA	None of the above	3,789	1.89	
Majority		23,680	11.84	
Turnout		199,956	77.83	
BJP gain from INC		Swing		

=== 2013 ===
2013 Madhya Pradesh Legislative Assembly election: Pawai
Party	Candidate	Votes	%	±%
INC	Mukesh Nayak	78,949	45.15	
BJP	Brijendra Pratap Singh	67254	38.46	
BSP	Feran Singh	11691	6.69	
GGP	Ghasoti Adiwasi	3977	2.27	
Independent	Chhatrapal Singh	2172	1.24	
Independent	Narendra Kumar Sharma	1648	0.94	
Independent	Jeevan Prasad	1413	0.81	
Independent	Mukesh	1357	0.78	
Independent	Kalpna Singh	1272	0.73	
Independent	Jawahar Lal	1200	0.69	
BSCP	Roshan Lal	805	0.46	
NOTA	None of the Above	3135	1.79	
Majority				
Turnout		174873	72.42	
Swing to INC from BJP		Swing		

== See also ==
- Pawai
