= Nachna Hindu temples =

Early stone temples in India

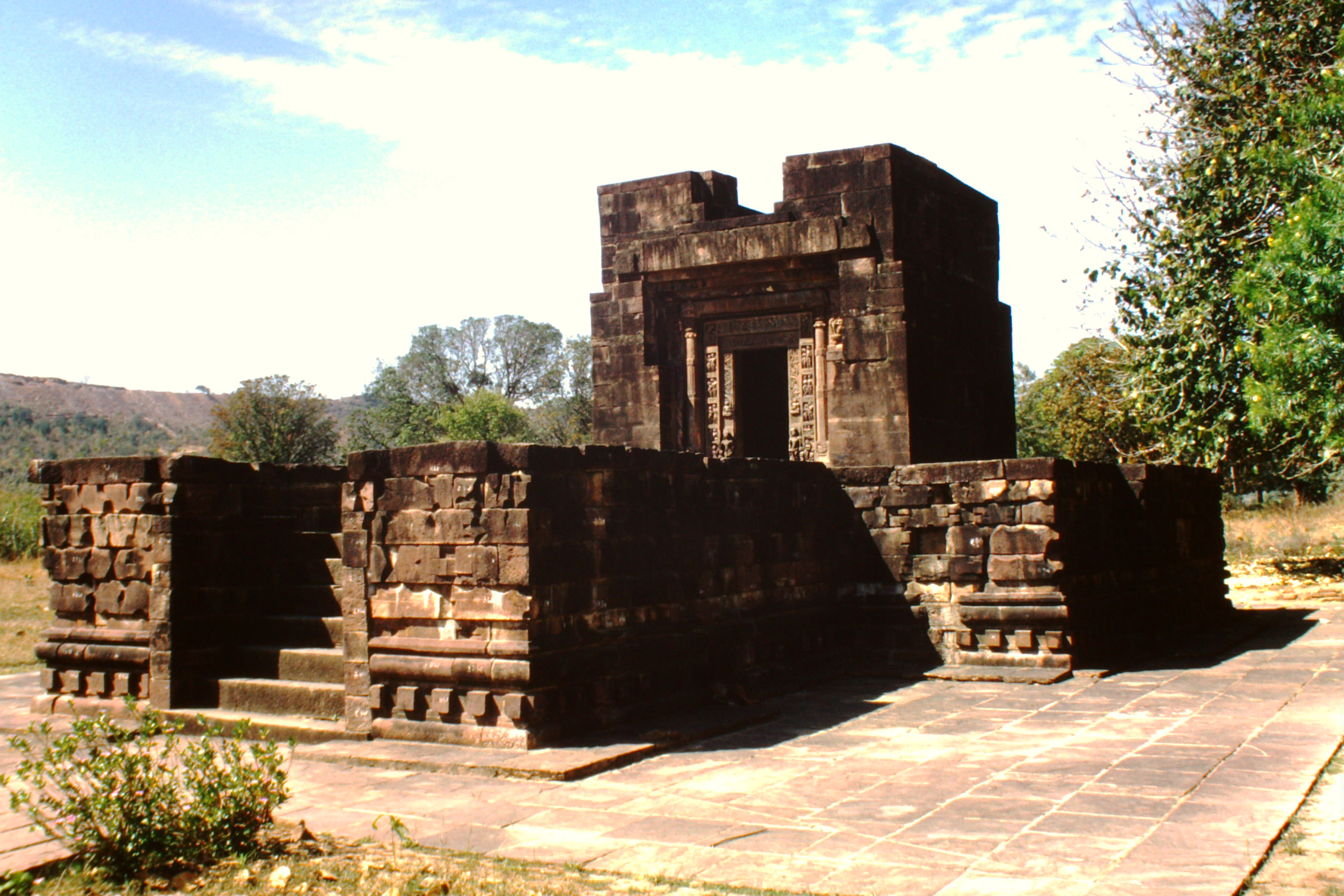
- Parvati Temple

- Location within India Location within Madhya Pradesh

Religion
- Affiliation: Hinduism
- District: Panna
- Deity: Shiva, Parvati, Durga, Vishnu, others

Location
- Location: Ganj
- State: Madhya Pradesh
- Country: India
- Coordinates: 24°23′57.3″N 80°26′51.2″E

Architecture
- Style: Nagara
- Completed: 5th or 6th century
- Elevation: 225 m (738 ft)

Nachna Hindu temples, also referred to as Nachana temples or Hindu temples at Nachna-Kuthara, in Panna district, Madhya Pradesh, India are some of the earliest surviving stone temples in central India along with those at Bhumara and Deogarh. Their dating is uncertain, but comparing their style to structures that can be dated, some of the Nachna temples are variously dated to the 5th- or 6th-century Gupta Empire era. The Chaturmukha temple is dated to the 9th century. These temples illustrate a North Indian style of Hindu temple architecture.

Most of the temples in the area are in ruins. The best preserved and most studied monument is the Parvati temple at Nachna. The temples are built on a raised and moulded plinth, a square plan, a square sanctum that is surrounded by a circumambulation passage with perforated screen stone windows. The entrance into the sanctum is flanked by goddess Ganga and Yamuna. The Parvati temple has an upper storey with a doorway. The temple includes both religious motifs and secular scenes such as amorous mithuna couples. The temples are notable for some of the earliest known stone friezes narrating several scenes from the Hindu epic Ramayana.

The temples are near the Panna National Forest, are now a pilgrimage site, which is also referred to as Chaumukhnath.

== Location ==
The temple site is near the Saleha village. It gets its name from the first publication in 1885 by Cunningham that brought it to the attention of western archaeologists during the British colonial era. Cunningham called it the Nachna-Kuthara temples in Volume 21 report of the Archaeological Survey of India, deriving it from the name of the district and another village in the region. The site is about 60 kilometres (37 mi) southwest of Satna, 100 kilometres (62 mi) southeast of Khajuraho, 100 kilometres (62 mi) north of Katni, and about 400 kilometres (250 mi) northeast of Bhopal. The nearest railway station is located in the city of Satna, while the closest major airport with daily services is Khajuraho (IATA: HJR).

The site is deep inside a forest territory, at the entrance of a difficult to traverse valley within the Vindhya mountains. This, speculated Cunningham, may have contributed to the temple's survival during the Muslim invasion of this region.

== History ==
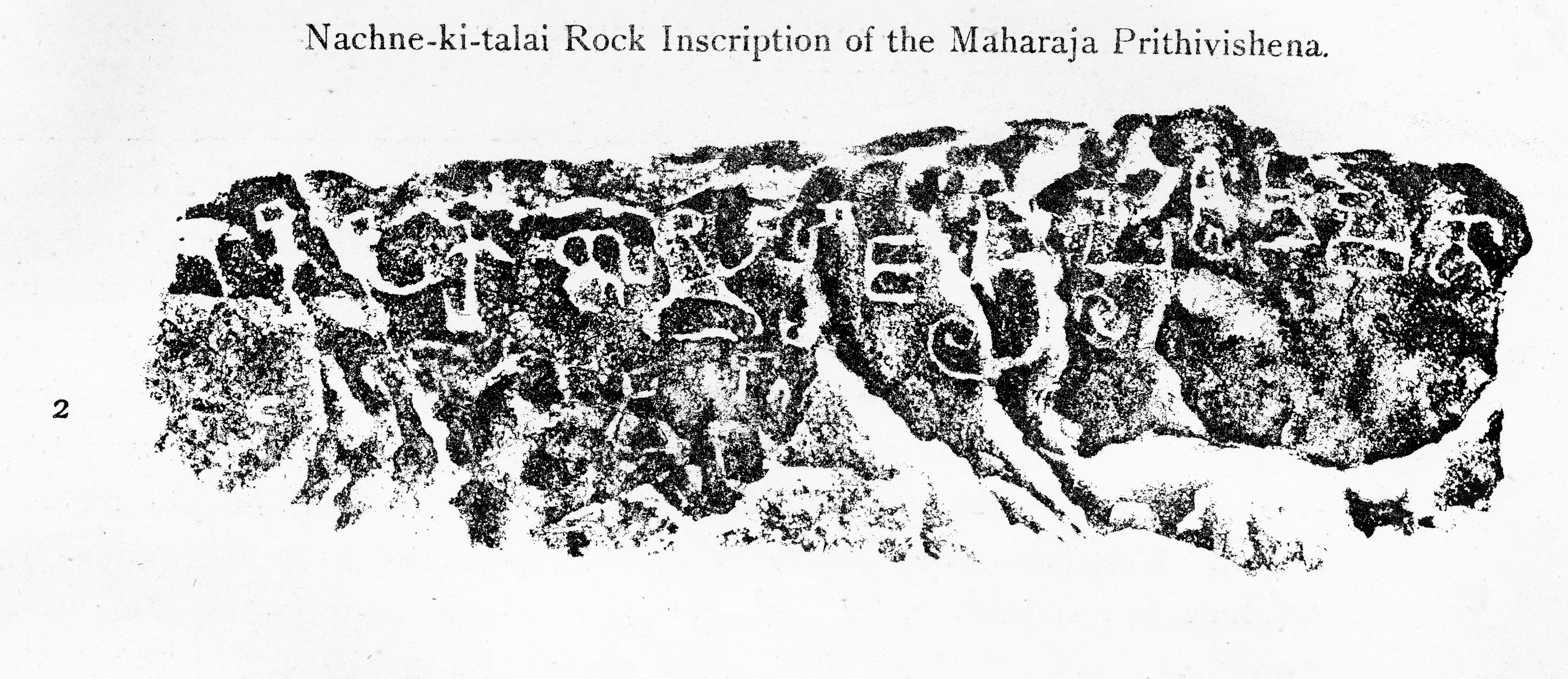
Nachna unfinished inscription of Vyaghradeva

The early history of the site is not known. Cunningham, in his first publication, mentioned that the way to the site was full of ruins and partially bricked monuments, except for the two stone temples with stone reliefs at the site were in remarkably well-preserved condition. According to him, regional people knew about these temples, visited them and thought that Nacchna-Kuthara was an ancient capital city of the Bundelkhand region. Other findings suggest that the site has attracted significant numbers of pilgrims for centuries, and up to the present day. After Cunningham's visit, the upper cella of the Parvati temple collapsed, and it was later reconstructed. The site originally had not yielded any inscriptions in its immediate vicinity, but later two rock inscriptions were found at Nachna site of Ganj. These have been dated to the 470–490 CE period, attributed to Vyaghradeva who inscribes his allegiance to the Vakataka king Prithvisena. One theory identifies Vyaghradeva with the Uchchhakalpa king Vyaghra, but this identification is disputed. Nevertheless, the discovery confirms that Nachna region was geo-politically important in the 5th century, and it politically links this region to an era when Ajanta Caves were also being built. According to Pia Brancaccio, the artists who built the Aurangabad Buddhist Caves and the Nachna Hindu temples may have come from the same school because the "visual and design elements of cave 3 at Aurangabad display surprising similarities with images and ornamental patterns", particularly when compares the sculpture on Parvati temple's window to those in Aurangabad. She states that at least some of the 5th-century artisans building Buddhist, Hindu and Jain images in Nachna, Ajanta and Aurangabad regions may have come from the same guild or school, even though the sites are separated by a distance of about 1,000 kilometres (620 mi).

=== Date ===
The two temples of significance at Nachna site are the Parvati temple built earlier and the Chaumukhnath Mahadeva (Shiva) Temple probably built centuries later. The Chaumukhanatha temple shows signs of additions and reconstruction in later centuries which makes it difficult to place it chronologically. The region has yielded many ruins in the form of foundation remains, sculpture and decorative parts from what Madhusudan Dhaky calls some ancient Hindu temples that are "now not extant".

Most scholars such as Radhkumud Mookerji place the Parvati Nachna temple in the Gupta Empire era, more specifically the second half of the 5th century). Michael Meister, an art historian and professor specializing in Indian temple architecture, places it more specifically to 465 CE. George Michell, another professor specializing in Indian temple architecture, states that dating this temple is difficult and places it a few decades later in the 6th century.

The Chaumukhanatha temple is generally placed in the 9th century, or at least few centuries after the stone temple dedicated to goddess Parvati. For example, Cunningham's original estimate in 1885 for the Chaumukhanatha temple was 600 to 700 CE, in contrast to his estimate of 400 CE for the Parvati temple.

== Temples ==
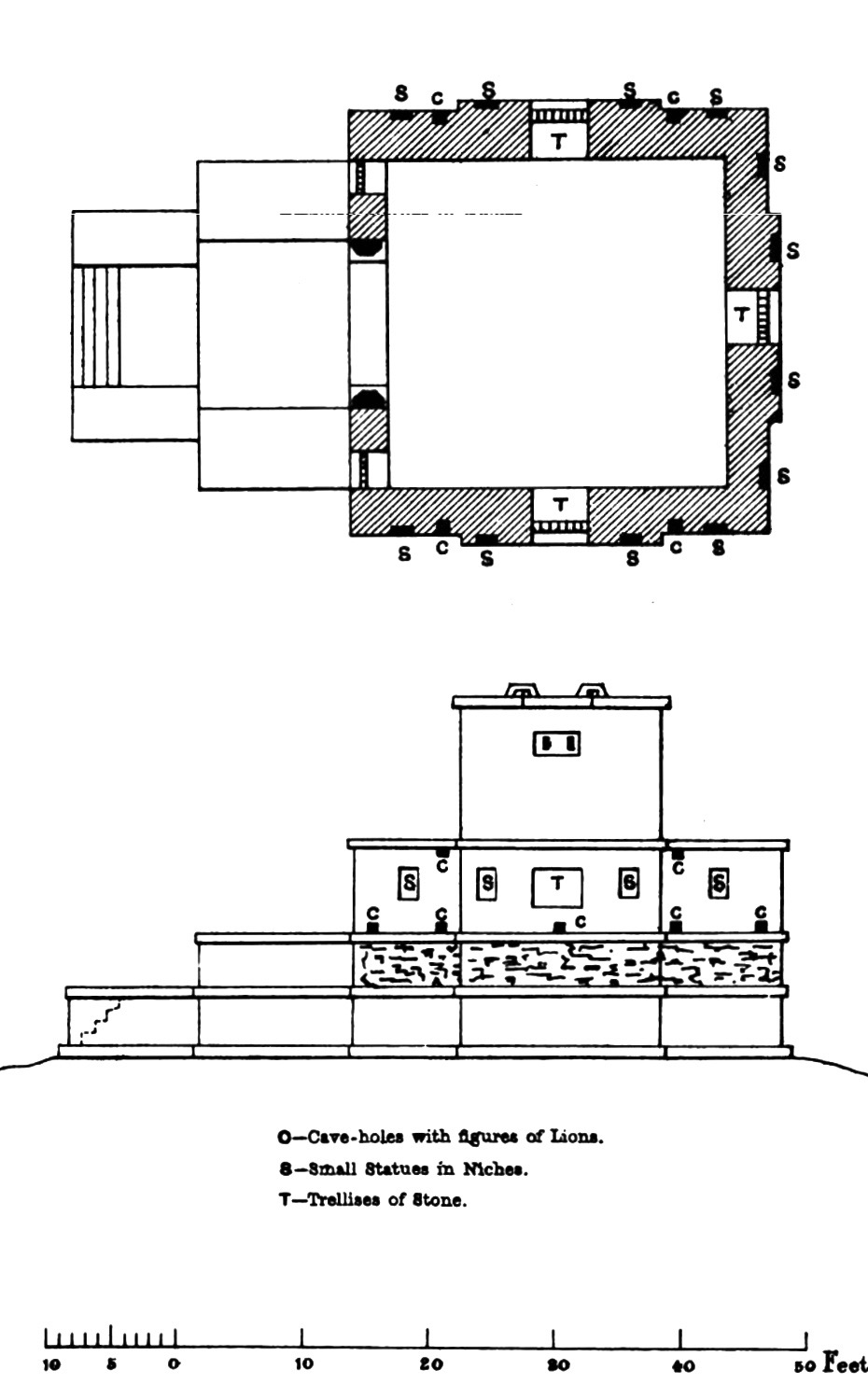
Parvati temple plan (square sanctum not shown).

The two most important temples of Nachna are close together. The Chaumukhnath Temple (translated as 'man with four faces') is dedicated to Shiva and has a four-faced mukhalinga in its sanctum. It stands in front of the 'Parvati Temple', but its sanctum image is missing.

=== Parvati Temple ===
==== Architecture ====
The Parvati Temple is a two-storey building with almost perfect square plan thick-walled sanctum of 15 feet (4.6 m) side on the outside, and is 8 feet (2.4 m) sided square inside (the garbhagriya is a cube). The temple opens to the west and stands on a jagati (platform) that is 4.5 feet (1.4 m) above the ground. The pilgrim reaches its sanctum using a stairway, and after passing through a mandapa that is 12 feet (3.7 m) square. The sanctum is surrounded by a roofed pradakshina patha (circumambulation pathway) that is 33 feet (10 m) on the outside and 26 feet (7.9 m) on the inside. (Note: The Parvati temple was in a better condition in the late 19th-century with its ambulatory walls and second-floor masonry cella intact. This collapsed and scholarly studies after 1950 have relied on colonial-era photographs in addition to site visits and archaeological discoveries at the site.)

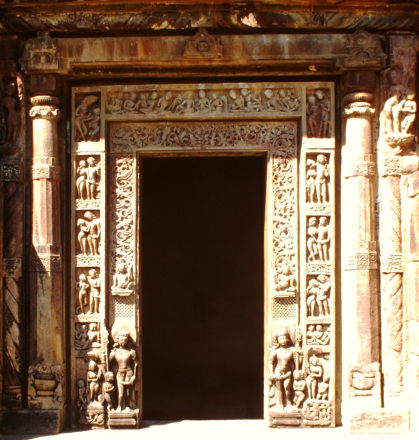
The stonework flanking the entrance have concentric panels of reliefs. The inner layer show two standing Shaiva dvarapalas, two seated gana and floral motifs. The outer panel shows the Hindu river goddesses at the bottom; then amorous couples in courtship and love scenes.

The outer walls have perforated stone windows (trellises) to allow natural light in. The upper-story is relatively plain. It lacks a roof or tower, but the structure suggests that it was likely a flat roof temple. This style of construction is seen in a few early temples (such as Sanchi, Temple No. 45; Deogarh, Kuraiya-Bir Temple, Lad Khan Temple in Aihole).

The Nachana temple is one of the prototypal Hindu temple styles that has survived from ancient India. It includes the cubical sanctum, narrates spiritual legends with carvings of divine legends and secular themes in a certain sequence both outside and inside the temple.

==== Sanctum entrance, door reliefs ====
The entrance to the sanctum (garbhagriha) has multiple columns, each decorated with carvings, with none monolithic. At their base is a (Kalasha). The lintel are also intricately carved. The doorway is flanked by guard figures in the lower part with Ganga with river crocodile and Yamuna with river turtle. Beside them towards the inside are symmetrically placed graceful Shaiva dvarapalas (door guardians), each holding the trident. Each is relatively larger than the river goddesses, but about 1 foot (0.30 m) in height. Concentric to the entrance are panels of intricate carvings. The first panel has floral and geometric motifs from the 5th century. Concentric to these are 10 friezes, 5 on each side above the river goddesses. These carvings show courtship and love making scenes (mithunas). On top of the lintel of the doorway are seated men and women miniatures shown as if they are leaning in and peering into the center of the sanctum. The style of sanctum door has stylistic similarities with those found in the Lakshmana Temple in the Sirpur Group of Monuments in Chhattisgarh.

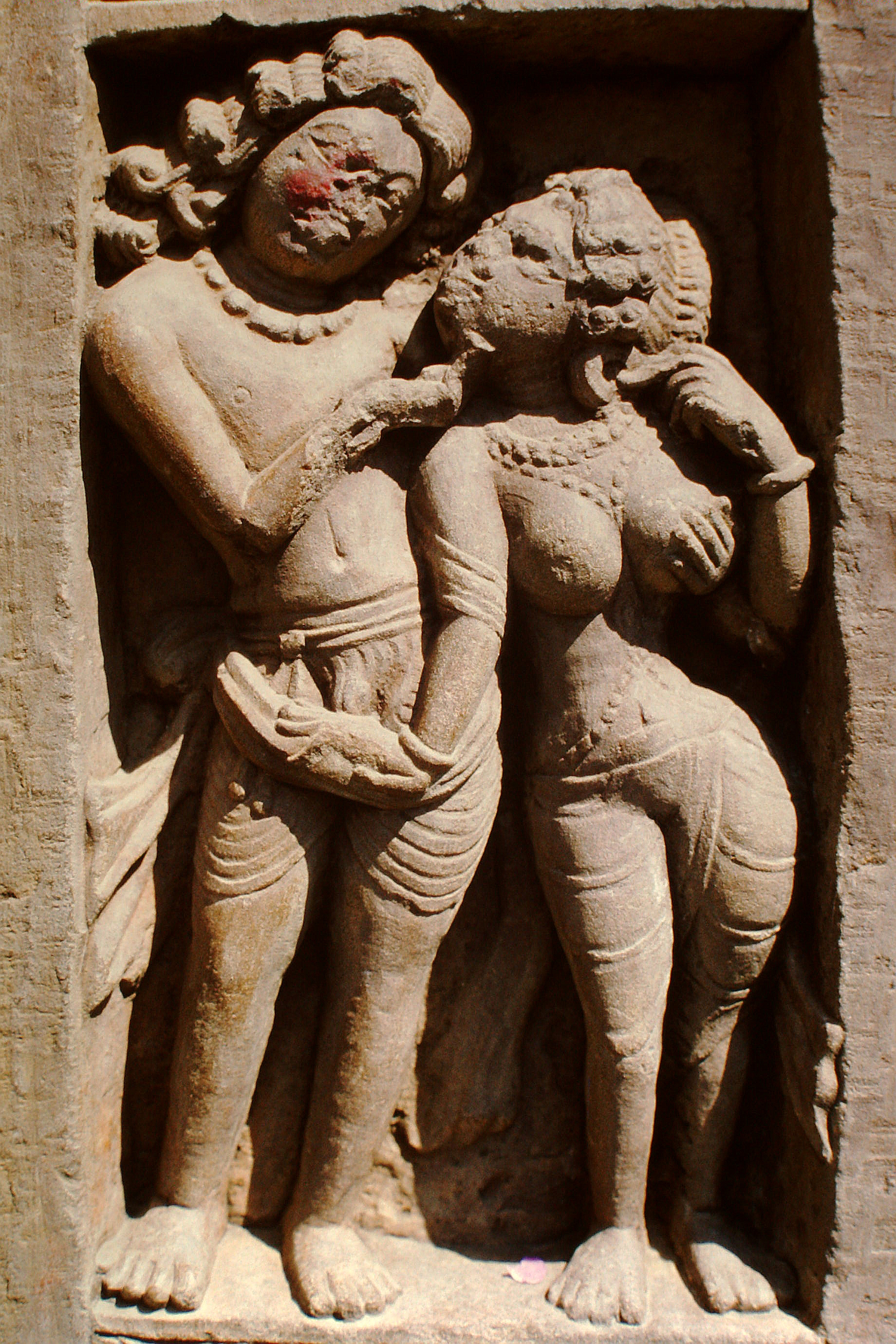
Mithuna

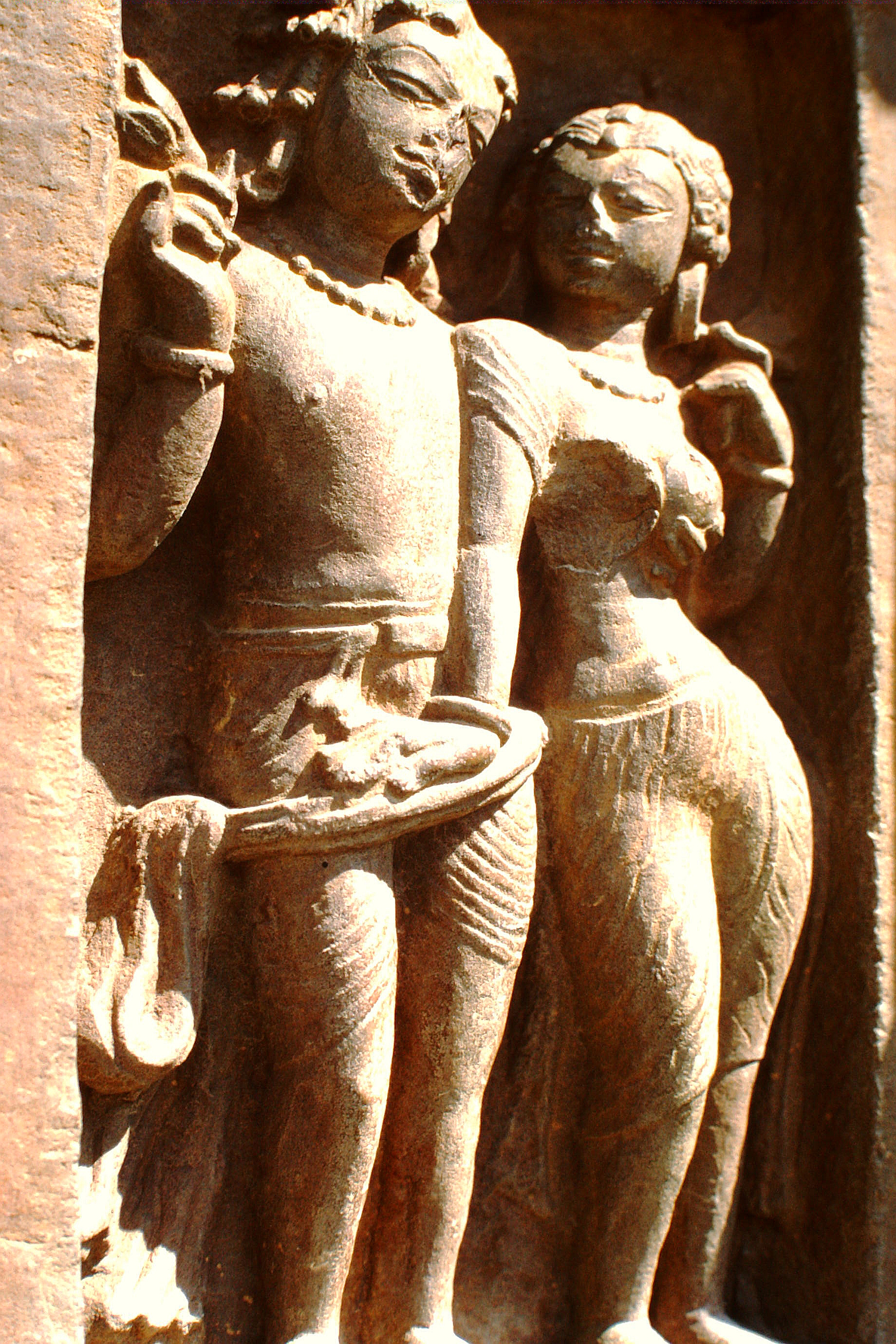
Mithuna

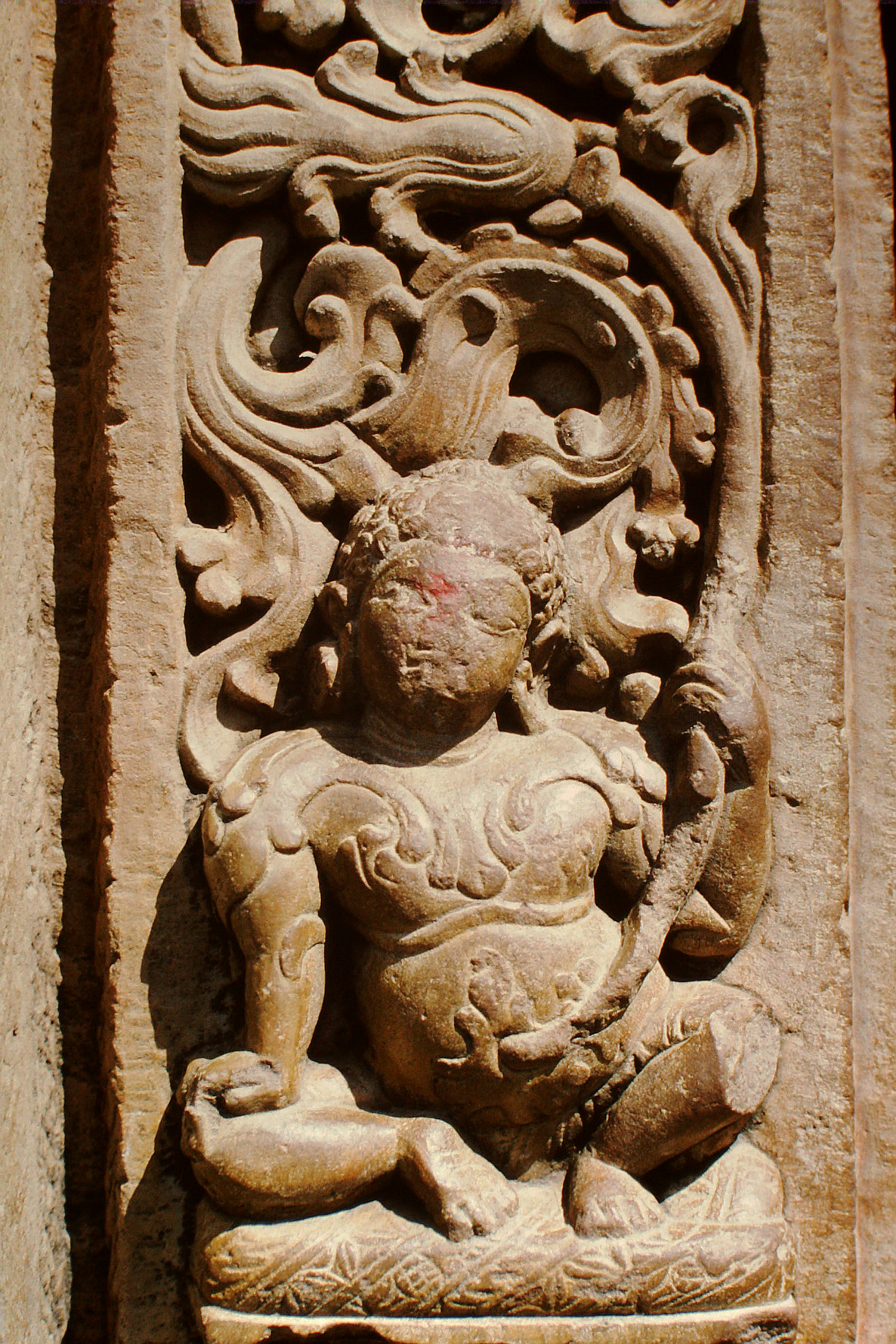
Dwarf with Tendrils

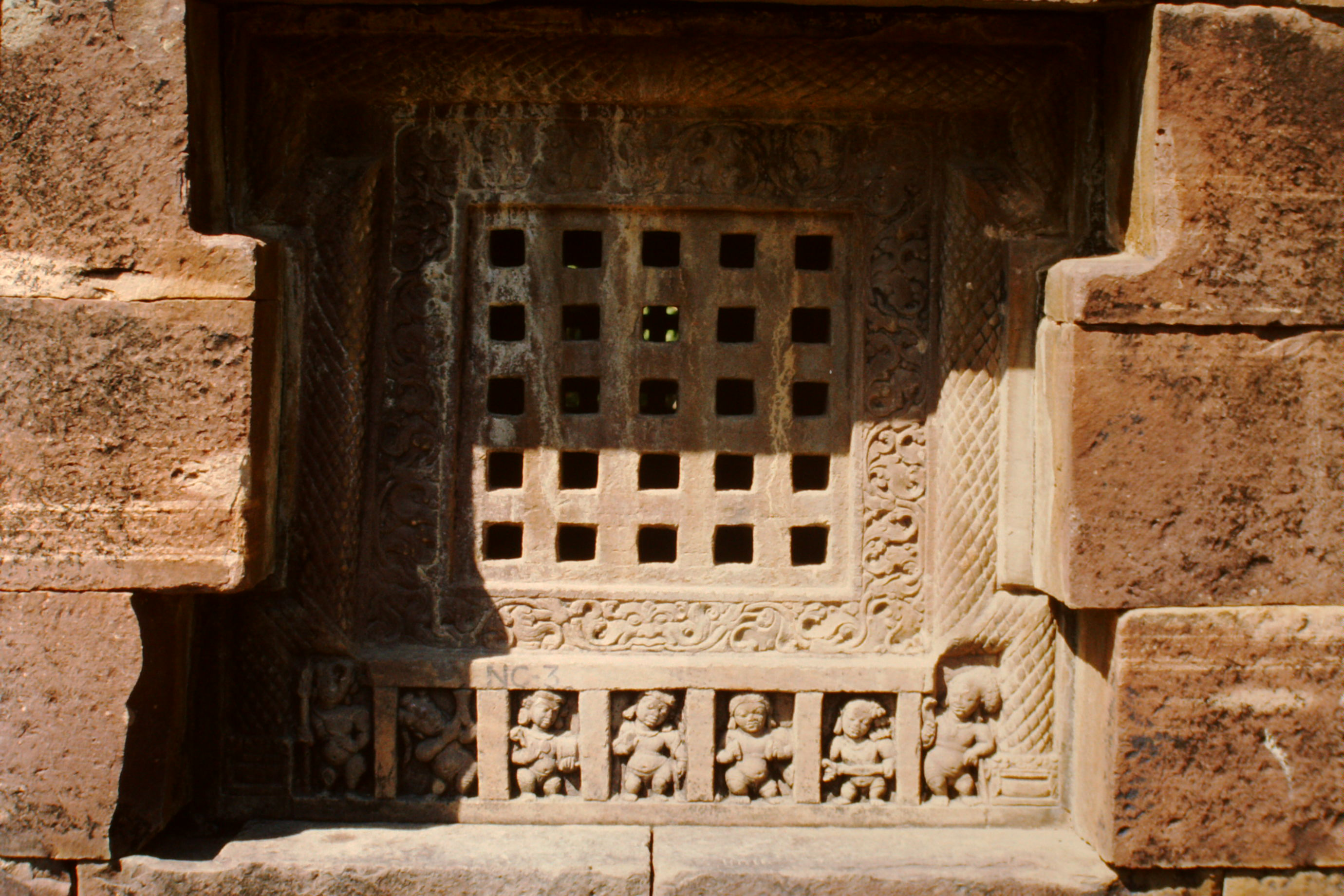
Perforated stone window at Parvati Temple

==== Perforated window ====
Two of the oldest trellises (jalis, perforated windows) of the Parvati temple show Ganas playing music, dancing or abstract decor. These probably date back to the third period of the 5th century.

In the 'rocky landscape' of the platform walls several small animal reliefs (resting gazelles etc.) were created, of which only a few have been preserved.

=== Chaumukhnath Temple ===
The Chaumukhnath temple, also referred to as the Chaturmukh Mahadeva temple, is named after the colossal linga inside the temple whose surface is carved with four faces on the four cardinal directions. The five faces are believed to express the five aspects of Shiva, namely, creation (Vamadeva), maintenance (Tatpurusha), destruction (Aghora), beyond space (Isana) and introspection (Sadyojata). The walls of the temple have images of divine attendants and each corner has the image of Dikpalaka. There are five storeys with images of carvings of ganas and river goddess on windows and doors.

==== Architecture ====
Comparable in ground plan and dimensions to the Parvati temple is the Chaumukhnath temple. The temple also has a square plan and has a door design similar to the Parvati temple, but otherwise it very different in style. The building is concentric squares, 16.75 feet (5.11 m) outside and 11.75 feet (3.58 m) inside. It does not have the two-storey structure of the Parvati temple, but presents another style in the form of a spire (shikhara) instead symbolically mimicking Shiva's Kailash mountain. The Shikhara is slightly curved as it rises towards the sky, with the total height of about 40 feet (12 m). This temple too stands on a jagati platform, but unlike the Parvati temple it has stairs to enter the temple from multiple directions.

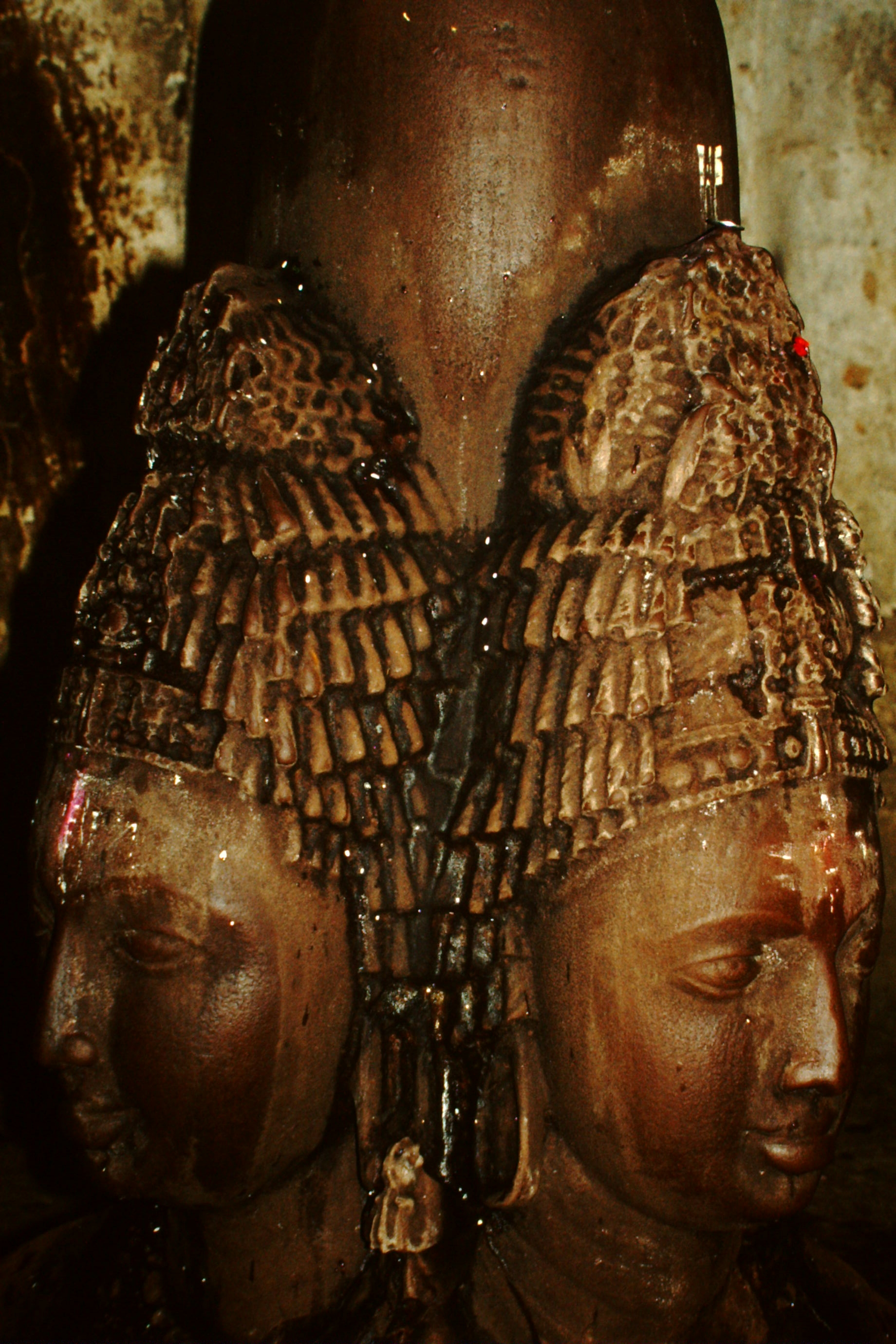
Chaumukhnath mukhalinga.

Offset from the Parvati temple, it opens towards the east, toward the rising sun. The architectural history of the temple is unusual and complex. It is likely that there was a Shiva temple here with its linga, but the temple was largely rebuilt in the 9th century on the original 5th-century platform and it reused as many parts as it could, such as the windows of the late-5th-century temple. The outer wall of the temple is divided in several places with the rich architectural decoration consisting of trellises, figures (mithunas), niches and decorative panels (udgamas) of the Pratihara style being attached at various levels, which lends the temple an unusual and interesting appearance. Visually and architecturally separated by a peripheral ledge of the outer wall sanctum, its tower was set up shortly afterwards.

==== Lingam ====
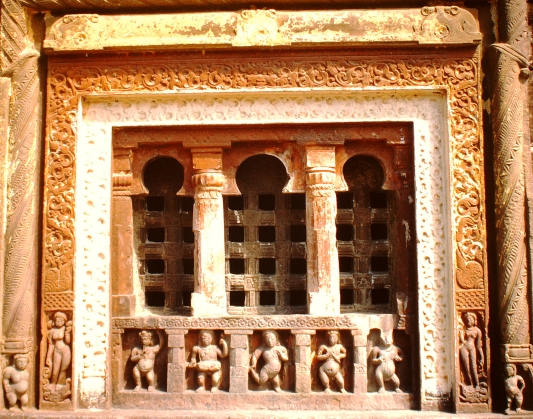
Chaumukhnath trellis, possibly from the 5th century, with dancing and music-making Ganas and the river goddesses Ganga and Yamuna

The interior of the small sanctum (garbhagriha) holds an approximately 4.67 feet (1.42 m) high Shiva-lingam with four faces (mukhalinga) with elaborate hair style, three of which exude calm with meditating closed eye, smiling posture. The fourth face of Shiva is shown as energized and in action, with wide open mouth, raised nostrils and slightly bulging open eyes likely the terrible aspect in his form as Bhairava. Stella Kramrisch dates the linga inside this temple to the 8th century. The faces of the mukhalinga represent the Panchamukha aspects of Shiva iconography, where Tatpurusha, Aghora (Bhairava, Rudra), Vamadeva and Sadyojata face the four cardinal directions, while Ishana the fifth is beyond space, all directions and time as the formless absolute in Hindu theology. They symbolize the creation (Vamadeva), maintenance (Tatpurusha), destruction (Aghora), and introspective subtle reflective Sadyojata aspects of Shiva as the metaphysical Brahman.

==== Trellis: stone window ====
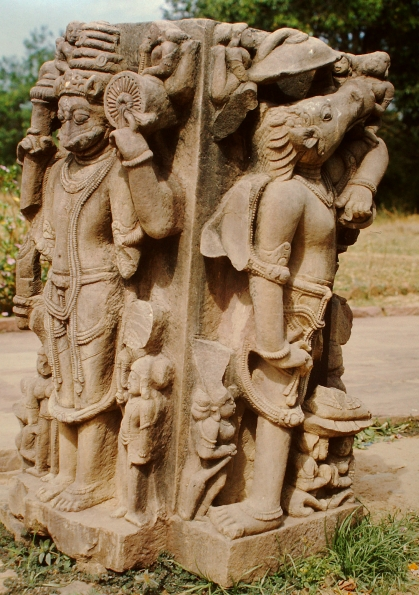
Nachna Vaishnavism themed ruin with four Vishnu Avatar representations; above: left is man-lion Narasimha, right is boar-headed Varaha.

Three Jali windows, which let little light into the dark sanctum, are among the temple's attractions. Its multi-layered composition and decorative figures are significantly more elaborate than the Jalis at Parvati Temple and more representative of the local adornments artistically-speaking. The actual window panel consists of two shells with rich profiled—reminiscent of wooden model—lattices inside and three small arcades in the exterior, formed as horseshoe arches. The polygonal broken pillars standing on a cubic base have a pumpkin-shaped pinnacle (amalaka) and end in a block-like attachment with abaco panel.

All three windows display music playing and dancing Ganas at the bottom, with symmetrically arranged river goddesses Ganga and Yamuna appearing in addition to their vahanas, in this case, each a river monster (Makara). The recessed frame mounts (shakhas) are richly decorated.

=== Other temples ===
About 400 meters south of the archaeological site of Nachna are more, relatively new temples (Teliya Madh temple, Rupani Temple), in which at its later establishment were fitted many century old figures and relief parts from destroyed Gupta temples. The ruins around the site suggest that in Nachna there were formerly several more temples from the Gupta-era.

An old stone window from the 5th century with horseshoe-shaped keyhole openings and several sculptures found were set up in the immediate vicinity of the Main Zone.

== Environment ==
Several smaller archaeological sites are found in a 15 km radius of Nachna: Pipariya, Khoh, Bhumara, and others. These are also attributed to the Gupta period, but are much less known and explored. In 1979 the Shiva temple of Bhumara was restored; it is one of the best preserved. The Gupta Temple of Tigawa is located about 80 km south-west, with another Gupta temple in Sanchi. The ruins of Bharhut Buddhist stupas are 12 km east. Dashavatara Temple is in Deogarh.

== Significance ==
The stone-based architecture and artwork at the temple site has survived, while the brick temples have not. Among the stone reliefs are some of the earliest known Ramayana friezes, such as the scene where Ravana appears in front of Sita pretending to be a recluse monk begging for food, while in reality seeking that she cross the protective Lakshmana Rekha so that he can kidnap her. Other Ramayana scenes depicted in Nachna site panels are among the most sustained ancient visual narratives of the epic, (Note: Four of the studied scenes found at the Nachna site are: [a] Ravana pretending to beg alms from Sita as a monk; [b] Upset Sita rebuking Lakshmana who places his hand on his ears because he doesn't want to hear it; [c] Rama hesitating in shooting his arrow to kill the heroic Vali who looks just like Sugriva; [d] The monkey army leaders including Hanuman offering respect to Rama.) comparable in significance to those found in the Vishnu temple in Deogarh. However, these are not the oldest known Ramayana depiction such as those found in Bharhut site dated to the 2nd century BCE, and at the Sanchi site generally dated to 1st century BCE to 1st century CE.

== See also ==
- Shreyansh Giri
