= Kakarhati =

- Town
- Location in Madhya Pradesh, India Kakarhati (India)
- Coordinates: 24.56°N 80.27°E
- Country: India
- State: Madhya Pradesh
- District: Panna

Population (2001)
  - Total: 7,096

Languages
  - Official: Hindi
- Time zone: UTC+5:30 (IST)
- ISO 3166 code: IN-MP
- Vehicle registration: MP

Kakarhati is a town and a nagar panchayat in Panna district in the Indian state of Madhya Pradesh.

== Demographics ==
As of 2001 India census, Kakarhati had a population of 7096. Males constitute 53% of the population and females 47%. Kakarhati has an average literacy rate of 51%, lower than the national average of 59.5%: male literacy is 60%, and female literacy is 40%. In Kakarhati, 19% of the population is under 6 years of age.
