= Alok Chaturvedi =

Indian politician

Alok Chaturvedi "Pajjan" is an Indian politician who was elected in 2018 to the Madhya Pradesh Legislative Assembly from Chhatarpur Constituency.
