= Ashok Veer Vikram Singh =

Indian politician

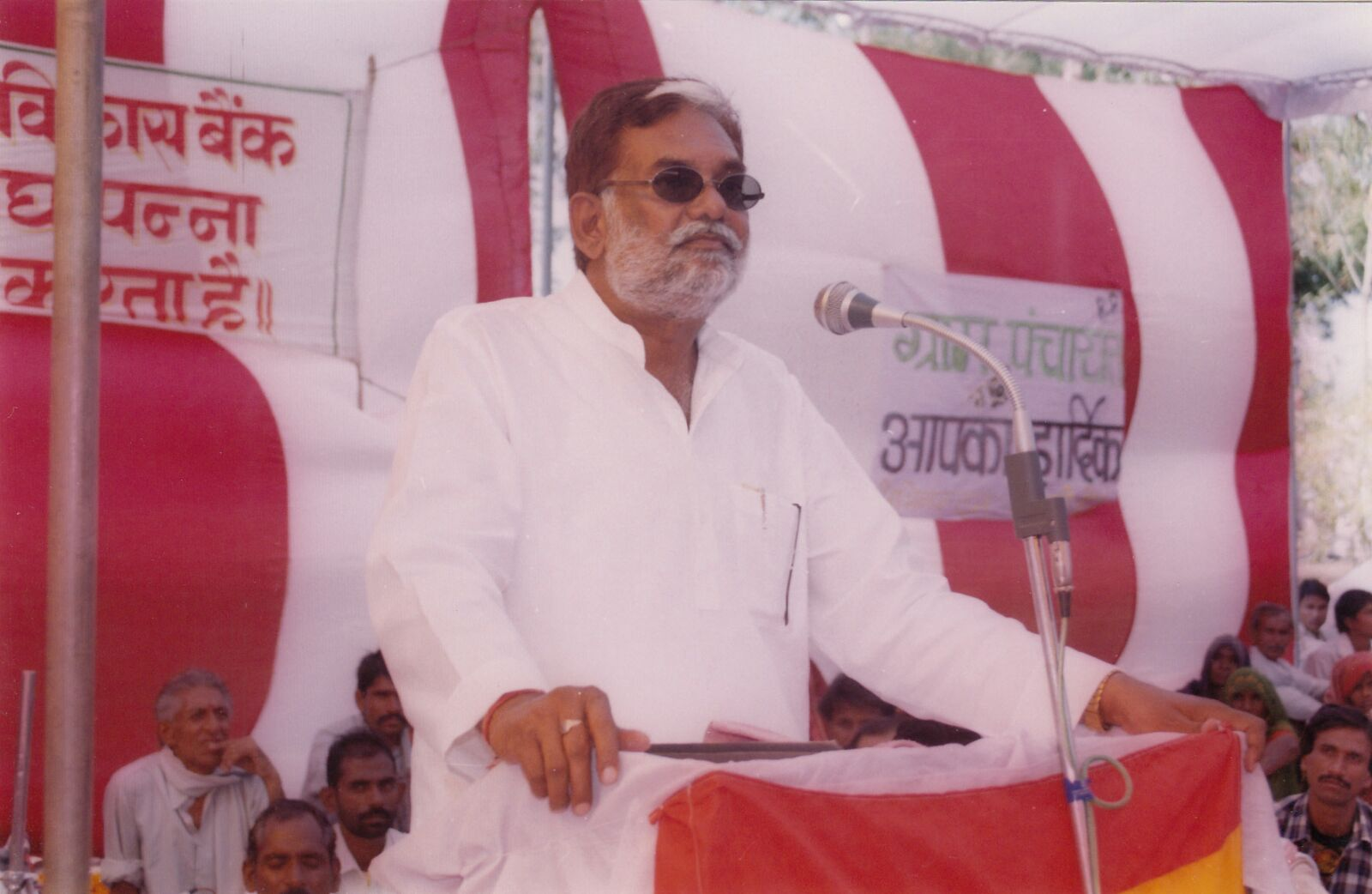
Bhaiya Raja addressing a Co-operative Bank gathering

Ashok Veer Vikram Singh, also known as Bhaiya Raja, was a member of Madhya Pradesh Legislative Assembly. He was convicted in two criminal cases.

== Biography ==
He was a politician who later rose to a fearsome image in Chhatarpur and Panna districts of Bundelkhand region in Madhya Pradesh.

=== Political career ===
He was son-in-law of Bharatiya Janata Party leader Jujhar Singh Bundela. He was elected to Madhya Pradesh Legislative Assembly as an independent candidate from Pawai in 1990 with a record margin of over 42,000 votes, although he was in jail at the time, in connection with a murder case. Bhaiya Raja vacated the seat for his close confidante - Mukesh Nayak, and got him a nomination from Indian National Congress in 1993. Nayak became a minister in Digvijay Singh cabinet and people would still vouch that without Bhaiya Raja's support, Nayak would never have won the election.

After a fallout with Nayak, Bhaiya Raja contested as a candidate of Samajwadi Party and again won in 1998. He was also chosen as the leader of Samajwadi Party legislatures in the assembly.

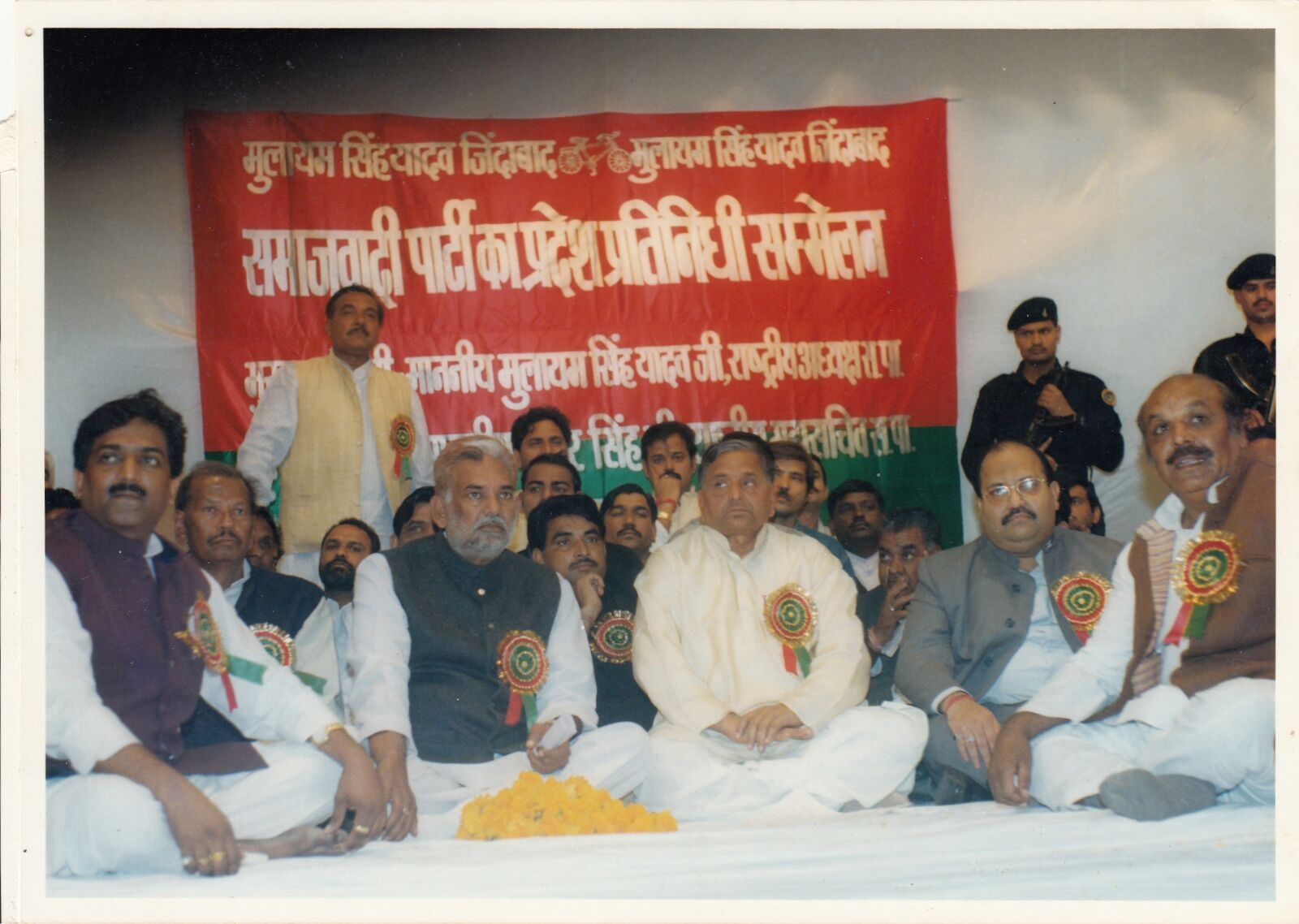
Bhaiya Raja with Samajwadi Party leaders Mulayam Singh Yadav and Amar Singh

He eventually lost to Bharatiya Janata Party candidate Brijendra Singh in 2003.

His wife Asha Rani won as a candidate of Bharatiya Janata Party from Bijawar constituency in 2008.

=== Criminal cases ===
He was accused in more than twenty cases.

In 1989, he was accused of murder of Siddharth Rao, a notorious criminal of Nainital and the nephew of former home minister of India Buta Singh. He was relieved of all charges regarding the case in 1990.

His domestic help, Tijji Bai, killed herself at his Bhopal home in November 2007. He and his wife Asha Rani were accused of abetment in suicide. Later they were convicted and sentenced to jail for ten years.

Vasundhara Bundela, a student of fashion design, was found dead at Misrod near Bhopal on 11 December 2009. He was arrested in 2009. He, along with his four aides, was convicted of her murder. He was sentenced to life in 2013. He was imprisoned in Bhopal jail.

=== Death ===
He suffered a brain haemorrhage and was hospitalised on 15 December 2014. He died on 19 December 2014 at Bhopal, Madhya Pradesh. His last rites were performed at his native place Gharwar a day later.
