= Khajwa, Chhatarpur =

Khajwa
- Town
- Location in madhya pradesh, india Khajwa (India)
- Coordinates: 24.9173634°N 79.9268581°E
- Country: India
- State: Madhya Pradesh
- District: Chhatarpur

Area
  - Total: 30.2 km^{2} (11.7 sq mi)
- Elevation: 174.8 m (573 ft)

Population (2021-2022, estimated)
  - Total: 20,823
  - Density: 690/km^{2} (1,790/sq mi)

Language
  - Official: Hindi/Bundeli
- Time zone: UTC+5:30 (IST)
- Postal code (PIN): 471625
- Telephone code: 07686
- ISO 3166 code: IN-MP
- Vehicle registration: MP-16
- sex ratio: 871 ♂/♀

Khajwa, officially known as Azad Nagar khajwa, also known as khajwa is the largest town, Janpad panchayat and Nagar Panchayat in Chhatarpur district in the Indian state of Madhya Pradesh. It is 11 km from Khajuraho, 5 km from Rajnagar and 38 km from district headquarters Chhatarpur.

== Geographics ==
Khawa is located at 24.9173634°N 79.9268581°E. It has an average elevation of 226 metres (741 feet). The khajwa town is divided into 20 wards for which elections are held every 5 years.

== Demographics ==
At the 2011 census, Khajwa had a population of 5892. Khjwa is the most populated town in Chhatarpur district.

== Schools ==
- Khajwa primary school.
- Bunryanpurwa primary school.
- Government School Khajwa.
- Primary Child School in khajwa (1st to 5th class).
- Government school Rajnagar

A high school opening was announced in 2018.

== Hospital ==
- Government Hospital Khajwa.

== Transport ==
=== Bus stop and bus stand ===
- Rajnagar bus stand.
- Khajuraho bus stand.
- Khajwa chauraha bus stop.

==== Train ====
- Rajnagar railway station.
- Khajuraho railway station.

===== Airport =====
- Khajuraho airport.
