= Rajnagar, Madhya Pradesh =

Rajnagar
- Town
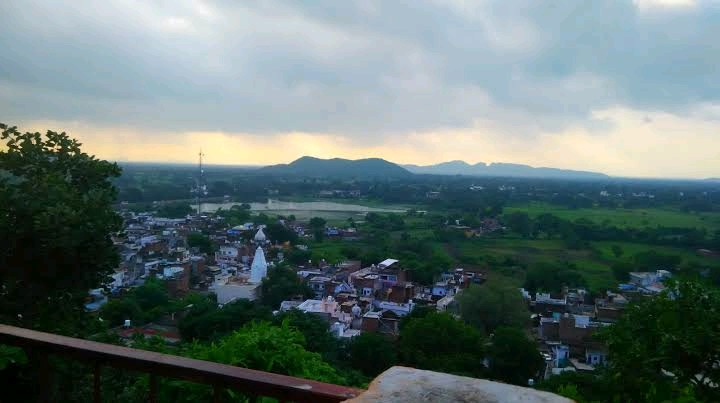
- Rajnagar, Madhya Pradesh

- Location in Madhya Pradesh, India Rajnagar (India)
- Coordinates: 24.8874961°N 79.9135889°E
- Country: India
- State: Madhya Pradesh
- District: Chhatarpur

Area
  - Total: 15.5 km^{2} (6.0 sq mi)
- Elevation: 273 m (896 ft)

Population (2011)
  - Total: 14,253
  - Density: 920/km^{2} (2,380/sq mi)

Languages
  - Official: Hindi/Bundeli
- Time zone: UTC+5:30 (IST)
- Telephone code: 07686
- ISO 3166 code: IN-MP
- Vehicle registration: MP16
- sex ratio: 882 ♂/♀

Rajnagar is a town and nagar panchayat in Chhatarpur district in the Indian state of Madhya Pradesh, it is 6 km from Khajuraho, 5 km from Khajwa town and 35 km from district headquarters, Chhatarpur.

== Geography ==
Rajnagar is located at 24.8874961°N 79.9135889°E. It has an average elevation of 273 metres (895 feet).

== Demographics ==
At the 2001 census, Rajnagar had a population of 12,442. Males constituted 53% of the population, and females 47%. In Rajnagar, 18% of the population is under 6 years of age.

In Census 2011, total population stood at 14,253.

Literacy rate of Rajnagar town was found to be 73.71%, higher than the state average of 69.32%. In Rajnagar, male literacy rate was around 79.93% while female literacy rate was 66.60% in 2011.

== Nearest town and cities ==
Chhatarpur, Khajuraho, khajwa, Panna, Mahoba, Nowgong are the nearby town and Cities to Rajnagar.

== Schools ==
- Government school Rajnagar.
- Little Angel's Model High school rajnagar.
- Sarswati Sishu Mandir

== Hospital ==
- Rajnagar government Hospital.

== Transport ==
=== Bus stop and bus stand ===
- Rajnagar bus stand
- Khajuraho bus stand
- Khajwa chauraha bus stop

=== Train ===
- Rajnagar railway station
- Khajuraho railway station

=== Airport ===
- Khajuraho Airport
