= Damoh Lok Sabha constituency =

Lok Sabha constituency in Madhya Pradesh

Coordinates: 23.82°N 79.44°E

Damoh
- Lok Sabha constituency
- Interactive Map Outlining Damoh Lok Sabha constituency

Constituency details
- Country: India
- Region: Central India
- State: Madhya Pradesh
- Assembly constituencies: Deori; Rehli; Banda; Malhara; Pathariya; Damoh; Jabera; Hatta
- Established: 1962
- Total electors: 19,25,314
- Reservation: None

Member of Parliament
- 18th Lok Sabha
- Incumbent Rahul Lodhi
- Party: Bharatiya Janata Party
- Elected year: 2024

Damoh Lok Sabha constituency is one of the 29 Lok Sabha constituencies in Madhya Pradesh state in central India. This constituency came into existence in 1962. It covers the entire Damoh district and parts of Sagar and Chhatarpur districts.

== Assembly segments ==
Presently, Damoh Lok Sabha constituency comprises the following eight Vidhan Sabha (legislative assembly) segments:

#	Name	District	Member	Party	2024 Lead
38	Deori	Sagar	Brij Bihari Pateriya	BJP	BJP
39	Rehli	Sagar	Gopal Bhargava	BJP	BJP
42	Banda	Sagar	Veerendra Singh Lodhi	BJP	BJP
53	Malhara	Chhatarpur	Bahin Ramsiya Bharti	INC	BJP
54	Pathariya	Damoh	Lakhan Patel	BJP	BJP
55	Damoh	Damoh	Jayant Kumar Malaiya	BJP	BJP
56	Jabera	Damoh	Dharmendra Singh Lodhi	BJP	BJP
57	Hatta (SC)	Damoh	Uma Devi Khatik	BJP	BJP

== Members of Parliament ==
Year	Winner	Party
1962	Sahodrabai Rai	Indian National Congress
1967	Manibhai J. Patel	Indian National Congress
1971	Varah Giri Shanker Giri	Indian National Congress
1977	Narendra Singh Judeo	Bharatiya Lok Dal
1980	Prabhunarayan Ramdhan	Indian National Congress (I)
1984	Dal Chandra Jain	Indian National Congress
1989	Lokendra Singh Judeo	Bharatiya Janata Party
1991	Ramkrishna Kusmaria	Bharatiya Janata Party
1996	Ramkrishna Kusmaria	Bharatiya Janata Party
1998	Ramkrishna Kusmaria	Bharatiya Janata Party
1999	Ramkrishna Kusmaria	Bharatiya Janata Party
2004	Chandrabhan Bhaiya	Bharatiya Janata Party
2009	Shivraj Lodhi	Bharatiya Janata Party
2014	Prahlad Patel	Bharatiya Janata Party
2019	Prahlad Patel	Bharatiya Janata Party
2024	Rahul Lodhi	Bharatiya Janata Party

== Election results ==
=== 2024 ===
2024 Indian general election: Damoh
Party	Candidate	Votes	%	±%
BJP	Rahul Singh Lodhi	7,09,768	65.18	+4.67
INC	Tarbar Singh Lodhi (Bantu Bhaiya)	3,03,342	27.86	−2.3
BSP	Engineer Goverdhan Raj	21,404	1.97	−1.97
BAP	Manu Singh Maravi	7,887	0.72	new
GGP	Rajesh Singh Soyam	3,190	0.29	new
NOTA	None of the above	3,190	0.72	N/A
Majority		4,06,426	37.32	+6.97
Turnout		10,87,123 (Note: does not include postal ballots)	56.48	▼9.35
BJP hold		Swing		

=== 2019 ===
2019 Indian general elections: Damoh
Party	Candidate	Votes	%	±%
BJP	Prahlad Singh Patel	704,524	60.51	+4.37
INC	Pratap Singh Lodhi	3,51,113	30.16	−2.64
BSP	Jittu Khare "Badal"	45,848	3.94	+0.48
PSP(L)	Thakurdas Patel	9,505	0.82	new
Majority		3,53,411	30.35	+7.01
Turnout		11,64,405	65.83	+10.5
BJP hold		Swing		

=== General Elections 2014 ===
2014 Indian general elections: Damoh
Party	Candidate	Votes	%	±%
BJP	Prahlad Singh Patel	513,079	56.14	+5.63
INC	Choudhary Mahendra Pratap Singh	2,99,780	32.80	−5.89
BSP	Devendra Chaourasia	31,519	3.46	+3.46
Majority		2,13,299	23.34	+11.51
Turnout		9,13,868	55.33	+11.21
BJP hold		Swing		

=== General Elections 2009 ===
2009 Indian general elections: Damoh
Party	Candidate	Votes	%	±%
BJP	Shivraj Bhaiya	302,673	50.51	
INC	Chandrabhan Bhaiya	2,31,796	38.69	
SP	Ahir Kamla Yadav	7,826	1.31	
Majority		70,877	11.83	
Turnout		5,99,124	44.12	
BJP hold		Swing		

== See also ==
- Damoh district
- List of constituencies of the Lok Sabha
