= Dharmendra Singh Lodhi =

Indian politician

Member of Madhya Pradesh Legislative Assembly
- Incumbent
- Assumed office 2018
- Preceded by: Pratap Singh
- Constituency: Jabera

Personal details
- Party: Bharatiya Janata Party
- Profession: Politician

Dharmendra Bhav Singh Lodhi is an Indian politician from Madhya Pradesh. He is a two time elected Member of the Madhya Pradesh Legislative Assembly from 2018 and 2023, representing Jabera Assembly constituency as a Member of the Bharatiya Janata Party.

== Political career ==
In the 2018 Madhya Pradesh Legislative Assembly election, Lodhi contested from the Jabera Assembly constituency on a Bharatiya Janata Party ticket. He faced Indian National Congress candidate Pratap Singh and won by a narrow margin of 3,485 votes, securing a total of 48,901 votes, while Singh received 45,416 votes.

In the 2023 Madhya Pradesh Legislative Assembly election, both Lodhi and Singh contested again from their respective parties. Lodhi won the election with a significantly larger margin of 15,883 votes, receiving 72,249 votes. Pratap Singh, representing Congress, was second with 56,366 votes. Notably, Vinod Rai, the candidate from the Gondwana Ganatantra Party, came in third with 52,657 votes.

== See also ==
- 2024 Indian general election in Madhya Pradesh
- Madhya Pradesh Legislative Assembly
