= Ajay Tandon =

Indian politician

Member of 15th Madhya Pradesh Assembly
- Incumbent
- Assumed office 21 May 2021
- Preceded by: Rahul Lodhi
- Constituency: Damoh Assembly constituency

Personal details
- Born: 4 September 1954 (age 71) Damoh, Madhya Pradesh, India
- Party: Indian National Congress
- Children: 2

Ajay Tandon (born 4 September 1954) is an Indian politician from Madhya Pradesh who is serving as Member of 15th Madhya Pradesh Assembly from Damoh Assembly constituency on behalf of Indian National Congress.

== Personal life ==
He was born on 4 September 1954 in Damoh to Chandra Narayan Tandon. He is married to Anju Tandon and has 2 daughters.
