= Ramkrishna Kusmaria =

Indian politician (born 1942)

Minister of Farmers Welfare and Agriculture Development, Government of Madhya Pradesh
- In office 20 December 2008 – 9 December 2013
- Preceded by: Gopal Bhargava
- Succeeded by: Gaurishankar Bisen
- Constituency: Pathariya Assembly constituency

Member of Parliament, Lok Sabha
- In office 1991-2004
- Constituency: Damoh
- In office 2004-2008
- Constituency: Khajuraho

Member of Madhya Pradesh Legislative Assembly
- In office 1977–1980
- Constituency: Hatta Assembly constituency
- In office 1985–1990
- Constituency: Hatta Assembly constituency
- In office 1990–1991
- Constituency: Hatta Assembly constituency

Personal details
- Born: 30 July 1942 (age 84) Sakor, Central Provinces and Berar, British India
- Party: Bharatiya Janata Party
- Parent: Shri Kanhaiyalal Kusmaria
- Education: M.Sc. (Agriculture), Ph.D. Educated at Jawaharlal Nehru Krishi Vishwa Vidyalaya, Jabalpur and Rani Durgavati Vishwavidyalaya, Jabalpur (Madhya Pradesh)
- As of 22 September, 2006

Ramkrishna Kusmaria (born 30 July 1942) is an Indian politician from Madhya Pradesh. He was a five-time Member of Parliament and four-time MLA. He won as MP, four times from Damoh Constituency, and once from Khajuraho Constituency. He was a member of Bharatiya Janata Party.

== Early life and education ==
Kusmaria was born in Sakor. His father Kanhaiyalal Kusumaria was a farmer. He is a post-graduate with an M.Sc. in Agriculture and later he also completed his doctorate from Rani Durgavati Vishwavidyalaya, Jabalpur.

== Career ==
Kusmaria was elected as MLA for the first time from Hatta Assembly constituency in Damoh in 1977 as Janata Party candidate. Again in 1985 he was elected as MLA from Hatta Assembly constituency as a BJP candidate. Later in 1990, he was elected for the third time as MLA from Hatta Assembly constituency.

After a stint in the Parliament for five terms from 1991 to 2008, he was elected as MLA for the fourth time but shifted to Pathariya Assembly constituency, also on BJP ticket in 2008, and resigned from the Lok Sabha on 19 December 2008. He also became Minister of Farmers Welfare and Agriculture Development in the Government of Madhya Pradesh. In 2018, he lost the Assembly Election as an independent from Damoh Constituency and Pathariya Constituency. He contested from two seats as a BJP rebel candidate. After an internal survey, Chief Minister Chouhan dropped many non-performing sitting MLAs, including Kusmaria.

=== Five terms in Parliament ===
He was elected as a Member of the Parliament from Damoh Lok Sabha Constituency in Madhya Pradesh representing BJP for the first time in 1991. He went on to win the next four Lok Sabha elections and was a member of the 10th, 11th, 12th, 13th and 14th Lok Sabha of India. After representing Damoh constituency from 1991 to 2004, he contested the 14th Lok Sabha from Khajuraho constituency also on BJP ticket and won.

He is also a president of Bundelkhand Development Authority from 2016 to 2019. He is appointed as chairman of state backward classes commission in year 2023. He joined Indian National Congress on 8 February 2019, but returned to Bharatiya Janata Party on 3 July 2020.
