= Prahlad Singh Patel =

Indian politician

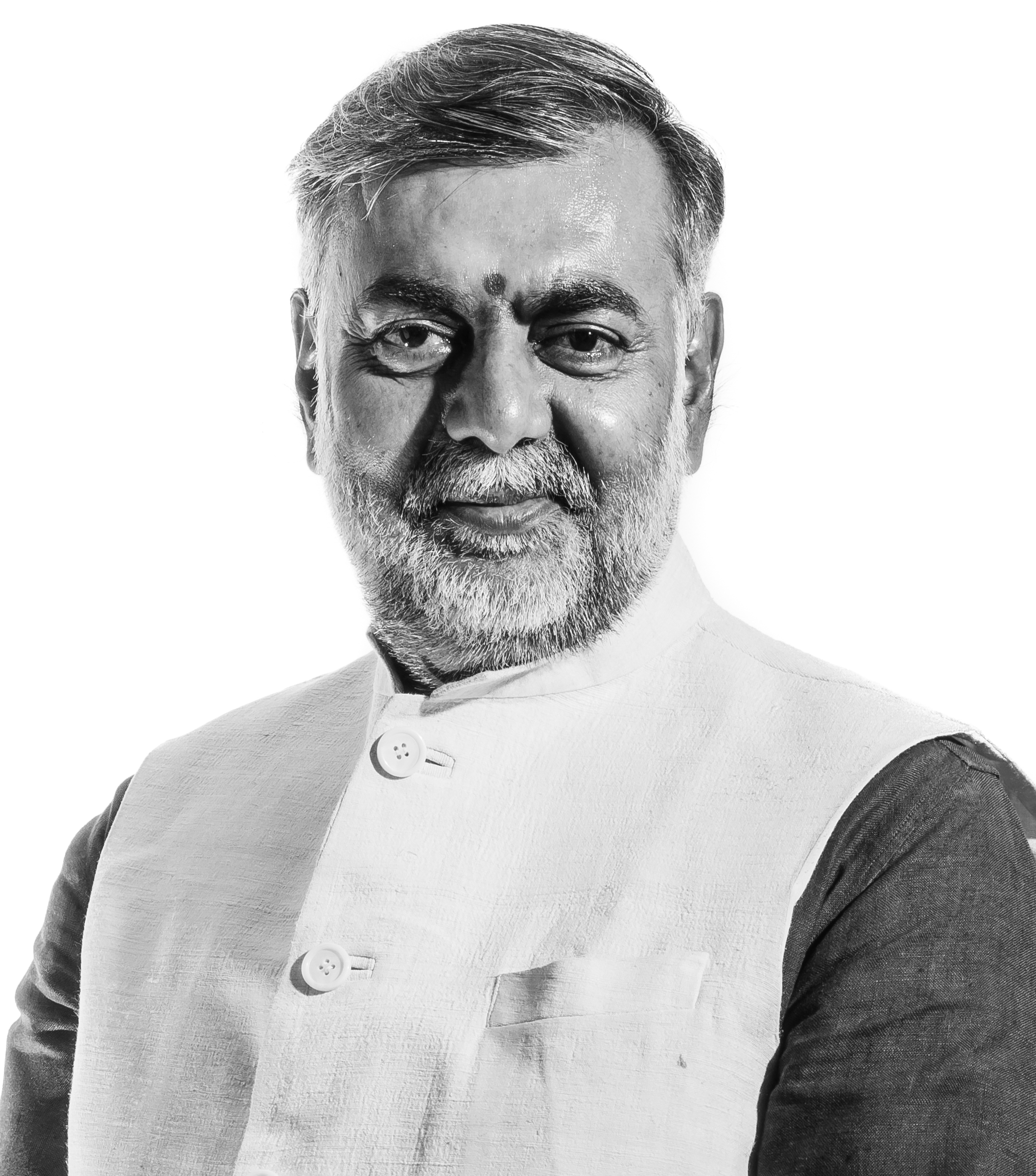
- Singh in 2023

Cabinet Minister in Madhya Pradesh
- Incumbent
- Assumed office 25 December 2023
- Chief Minister: Mohan Yadav
- Ministry & Departments: Panchayat & Rural Development; Labour
- Preceded by: Brijendra Pratap Singh

Member of Madhya Pradesh Legislative Assembly
- Incumbent
- Assumed office 6 December 2023
- Preceded by: Jalam Singh Patel
- Constituency: Narsinghpur

Union Minister of State for Jal Shakti
- In office 7 July 2021 – 6 December 2023
- Prime Minister: Narendra Modi
- Minister: Gajendra Singh Shekhawat
- Preceded by: Rattan Lal Kataria

Union Minister of State for Food Processing Industries
- In office 7 July 2021 – 6 December 2023
- Prime Minister: Narendra Modi
- Minister: Pashupati Kumar Paras
- Preceded by: Rameswar Teli
- Succeeded by: Shobha Karandlaje

Union Minister of State (Independent Charge) for Culture
- In office 30 May 2019 – 7 July 2021
- Prime Minister: Narendra Modi
- Preceded by: Mahesh Sharma
- Succeeded by: G. Kishan Reddy

Union Minister of State (Independent Charge) for Tourism
- In office 30 May 2019 – 7 July 2021
- Prime Minister: Narendra Modi
- Preceded by: Alphons Kannanthanam
- Succeeded by: G. Kishan Reddy

Union Minister of State for Coal
- In office 24 May 2003 – 22 May 2004
- Prime Minister: Atal Bihari Vajpayee
- Preceded by: Ravi Shankar Prasad
- Succeeded by: Dasari Narayana Rao

Member of Parliament, Lok Sabha
- In office 26 May 2014 – 6 December 2023
- Preceded by: Shivraj Singh Lodhi
- Succeeded by: Rahul Lodhi
- Constituency: Damoh, Madhya Pradesh
- In office 13 October 1999 – 22 May 2004
- Preceded by: Gaurishankar Bisen
- Succeeded by: Gaurishankar Bisen
- Constituency: Balaghat, Madhya Pradesh
- In office 16 May 1996 – 19 March 1998
- Preceded by: Vimla Verma
- Succeeded by: Vimla Verma
- Constituency: Seoni, Madhya pradesh
- In office 2 December 1989 – 21 June 1991
- Preceded by: Gargi Shankar Mishra
- Succeeded by: Vimla Verma
- Constituency: Seoni, Madhya Pradesh

Personal details
- Born: 28 June 1960 (age 66) Narsinghpur, Madhya Pradesh, India
- Party: Bharatiya Janata Party
- Height: 6 ft 3 in (191 cm)
- Spouse: Pushpalata Singh Patel (m. 1991)
- Children: 3
- Education: Government Science College, Jabalpur; University of Jabalpur
- Occupation: Agriculturist; politician
- Website: http://prahladsinghpatel.com/

Prahlad Singh Mulayam Singh Patel (born 28 June 1960) is an Indian politician who is currently Madhya Pradesh Minister. He is the former Minister of State for Food Processing Industries and Jal Shakti of India from 7 July 2021 till 3 December 2023. He is a Member of Parliament from Damoh Loksabha Constituency in Madhya Pradesh. He was minister of state for coal in Third Vajpayee Ministry. He was first elected to 9th Lok Sabha in 1989 and again re-elected to 11th Lok Sabha in 1996 (2nd term), 13th Lok Sabha in 1999 (3rd term) from Balaghat, 16th Lok Sabha in 2014 (4th term) and 17th Lok Sabha in 2019 (5th term) from Damoh. He was born in Narsinghpur and is an advocate by profession. He is a graduate of the Government Science College, Jabalpur.

== Career ==
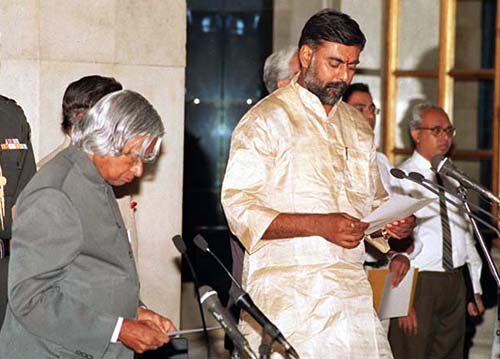
Patel taking oath as Minister of State at a Swearing-in-Ceremony in New Delhi on May 24, 2003.

Prahlad Singh Patel who is BJP Representative was elected as MP for first time from Madhya Pradesh constituency. In May 2019, Patel became the Minister of State (Independent Charge) for Culture and Tourism.

He was elected to the Lok Sabha, lower house of the Parliament of India from Damoh, Madhya Pradesh in the 2019 Indian general election as member of the Bharatiya Janata Party.

Lok Sabha
Preceded by Gargi Shankar Mishra	Member of Parliament for Seoni; 1989 – 1991	Next: Vimla Verma
Preceded by Vimla Verma	Member of Parliament for Seoni; 1996 – 1998	Next: Vimla Verma
Preceded by Gaurishankar Bisen	Member of Parliament for Balaghat; 1999 – 2004	Next: Gaurishankar Bisen
Preceded by Shivraj Singh Lodhi	Member of Parliament for Damoh; 2014 - 2023	Next: TBD
Political offices
Preceded by Alphons Kannanthanam; Minister of State with Independent Charge	Minister of Tourism; 31 May 2019 - 7 July 2021; Minister of State with Independent Charge	Next: G. Kishan Reddy
Preceded by Mahesh Sharma; Minister of State with Independent Charge	Minister of Culture; 31 May 2019 - 7 July 2021; Minister of State with Independent Charge	Next: G. Kishan Reddy
