= Banda Assembly constituency =

Banda Assembly constituency may refer to:

- Banda, Madhya Pradesh Assembly constituency
- Banda, Uttar Pradesh Assembly constituency
