= Veerendra Singh Lodhi =

Indian politician

Veerendra Singh Lodhi (Lambardar) (born 1973) is an Indian politician from Madhya Pradesh, India. He is an MLA of Bharatiya Janata Party from Banda, Madhya Pradesh Assembly constituency of Sagar district.

== Early life and education ==
Lodhi resides in Banda. HIs father Shivraj Singh Thakur is a farmer. He is a retired teacher. He completed his Post Graduate in Social sciences in 1998 from Rajiv Gandhi Government College Banda, Sagar district. Later, he did a Diploma in D.Ed. in 2007.

== Career ==
He won the 2023 Madhya Pradesh Legislative Assembly election defeating Tarwar Singh Lodhi of Indian National Congress. Veerendra polled 90,911 votes and won with bya margin of 34,751 votes.
