= 2021 Damoh Legislative Assembly by-elections =

← 2020	17 April 2021	Next →

1 vacant seats in the Madhya Pradesh Legislative Assembly
	Majority party	Minority party
Leader	Mr. Rahul Singh	Mr. Ajay Kumar Tandon
Party	BJP	INC
Leader's seat	Damoh	Damoh
Seats before	1	0
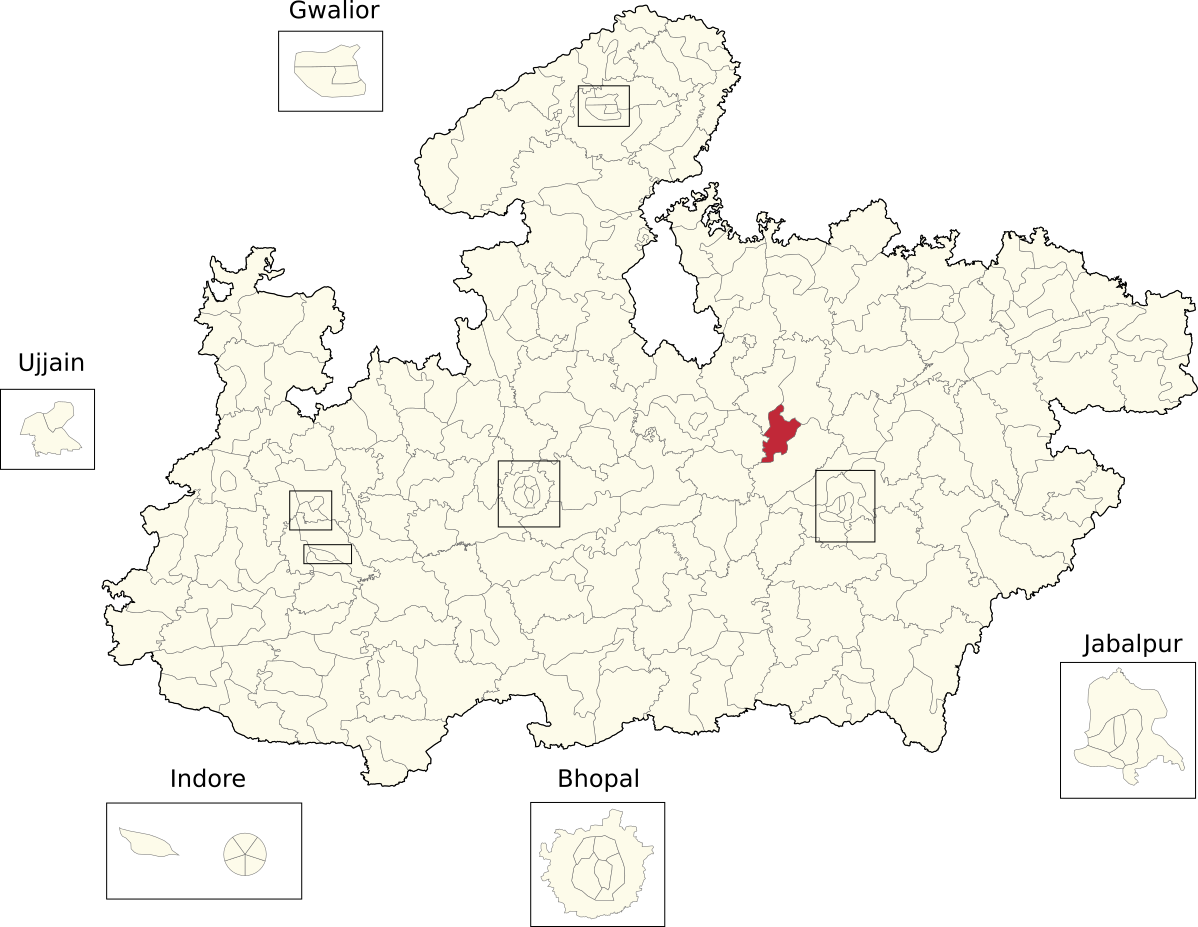

Indian by-elections for the Vidhan Sabha constituency Damoh were held on 17 April 2021.

== Election results ==
=== 2021 Vidhan Sabha ===
M.P. Legislative Assembly by-Election, 2021: Damoh
Party	Candidate	Votes	%	±%
INC	Ajay Kumar Tandon	74,832	52.28	
BJP	Rahul Lodhi	57,735	40.34	
BSCP	Uma Singh Lodhi	3,775	2.64	
SS	Raj Pathak	146	0.1	
IND.	Rahul Bhaiya Ji	1,053	0.74	
None of the Above	None of the Above	720	0.5	
Majority		TBD	TBD	
Turnout		1,43,124		
INC hold		Swing		
