= Garhakota =

- Town
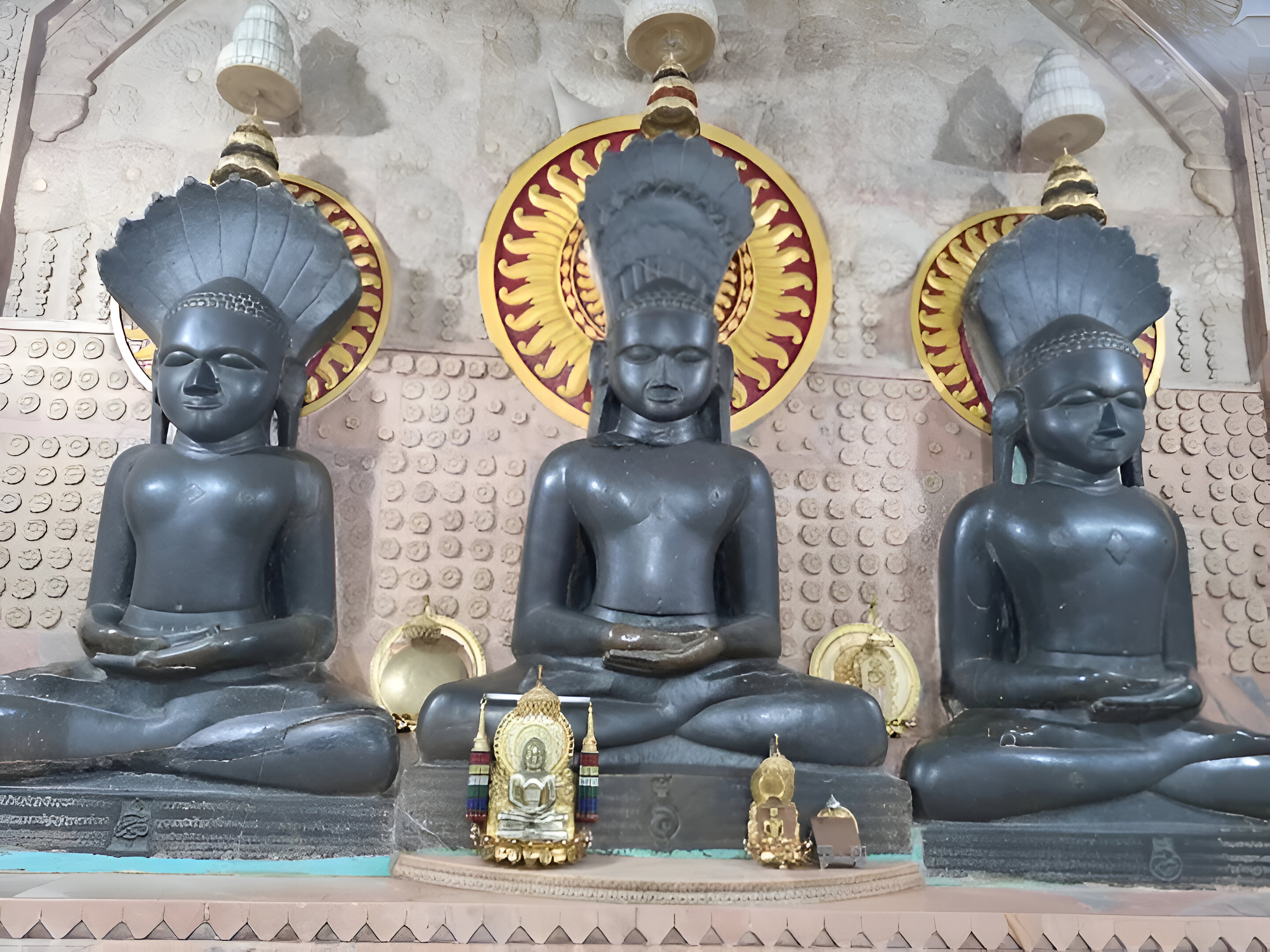
- Shri Digambar Jain Temple Pateriya

- Location in Madhya Pradesh, India Garhakota (India)
- Coordinates: 23.77°N 79.15°E
- Country: India
- State: Madhya Pradesh
- District: Sagar
- Elevation: 373 m (1,224 ft)

Population (2011)
  - Total: 32,728

Languages
  - Official: Hindi
- Time zone: UTC+5:30 (IST)
- Postal code: 470229
- Vehicle registration: MP-15

Garhakota is a town and a municipality in Sagar district in the state of Madhya Pradesh, India. It is also a tehsil headquarter.

== Geography ==
Garhakota is located at 23.77°N 79.15°E. It has an average elevation of 373 metres (1,223 feet). Garhakota is situated on the bank of Sunar River and Gadheri river.

== Demographics ==
As of 2001 India census, Garhakota had a population of 26,877. Males constitute 52% of the population and females 48%. Garhakota has an average literacy rate of 67%, higher than the national average of 59.5%: male literacy is 77%, and female literacy is 57%. In Garhakota, 16% of the population is under 6 years of age.

== Government ==
Pt. Gopal Bhargava, who is currently the PWD Minister in MP government, comes from this town.

It comes under the Rehli constituency and is well developed in comparison to other towns of Sagar district.

== Transportation ==
Garhakota is located on Sagar to Damoh and Katni road; daily bus service is available from here. The nearest railway station to Garhakota is Patharia. However, since 50% of trains do not stop at Patharia, passengers usually begin their journey from Damoh railway station.

== Tourism ==
=== Lord Jagannath Tample Pateriya ji ===
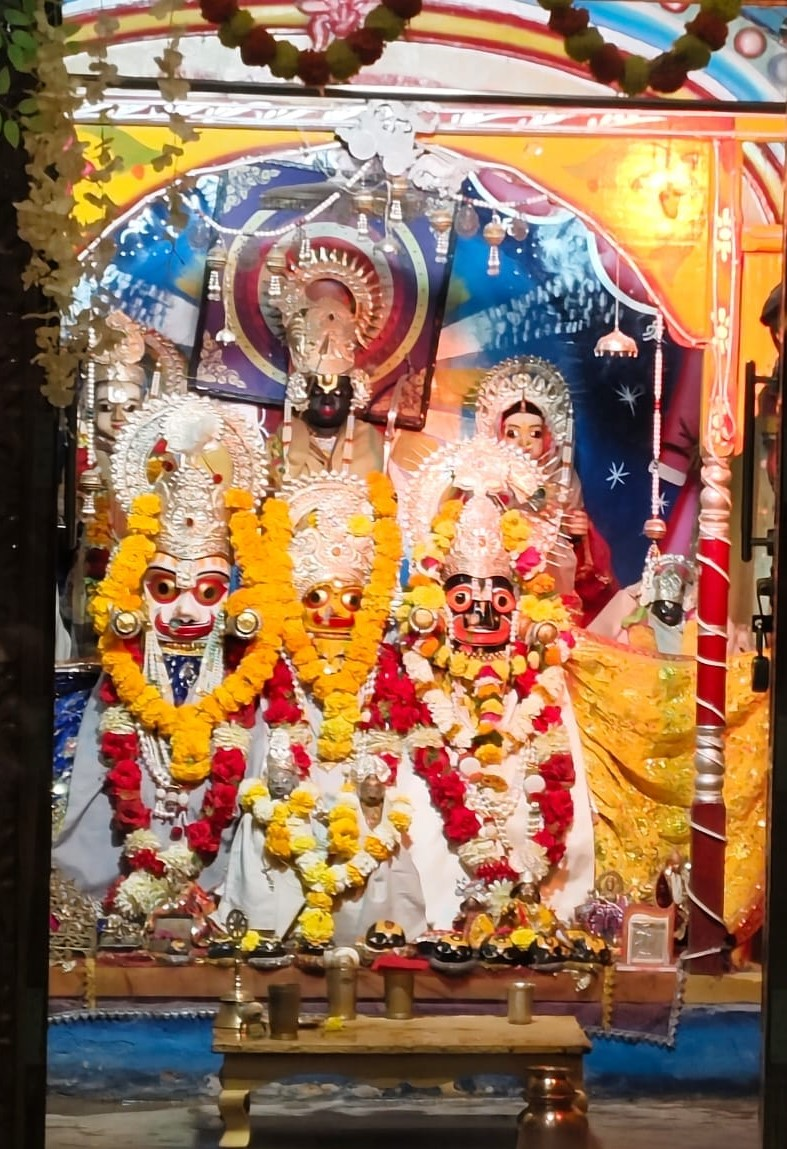
Lord Jagannath swami Garhakota

Lord Jagannanth Temple is more than 200 years old. In this temple, Lord Jagannath Swami is seated with his brother Balram and sister Subhadra. Every year on Rath Doj (Rath Yatra), Lord Jagannath Swami comes out to the city with his elder brother and sister to give darshan to his devotees.

They were Zameendars of Pateriya Riyasat and close associates of the Rajput Kings of Garhakota. They were Jijhotiya Brahmins. Pateriya was not their original surname. That was their title or "upadhi" which was awarded by the Bundela King Jujhar Singh for their victorious participation in battles against the Moguls in the 17th century. Pateriya Fort, Gopalji Krishna temple, Jagannathji Pateriya Vishnu temple and Shiv temple were built in 16th century AD. The Pateriya fort was abandoned after the Ghadar rampage. Land records evidence are available at the Revenue Office of Rehli tehsil; 1874 acres in name of Munna Lal Patriya of Garhakota, after independence in 1947.

=== Shri Ashtvinayak siddhivinayak Temple ===
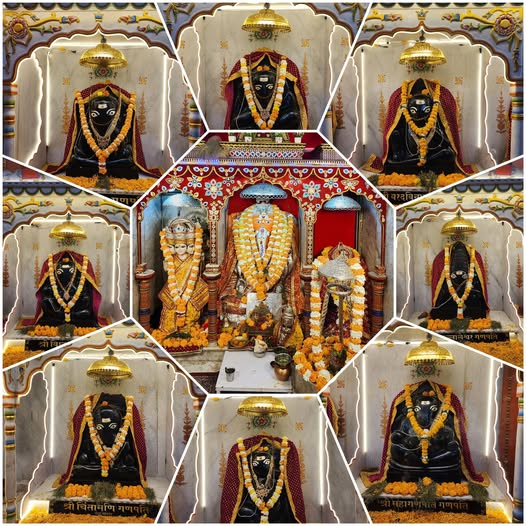
Shri Ashtvinayak

Gadhakota is the first place in the country where Shri Ashtavinayak is seated together. In Maharashtra, all the eight statues of Lord Ashtavinayak are seated at different places. This temple is ancient and was renovated by then minister Shri Gopal Bhargava. This temple is situated on the banks of the river on the Sagar-Damoh main road.

=== Shree 1008 Parshvanatha Digambar Jain Atishay Kshetra Pateriaji ===
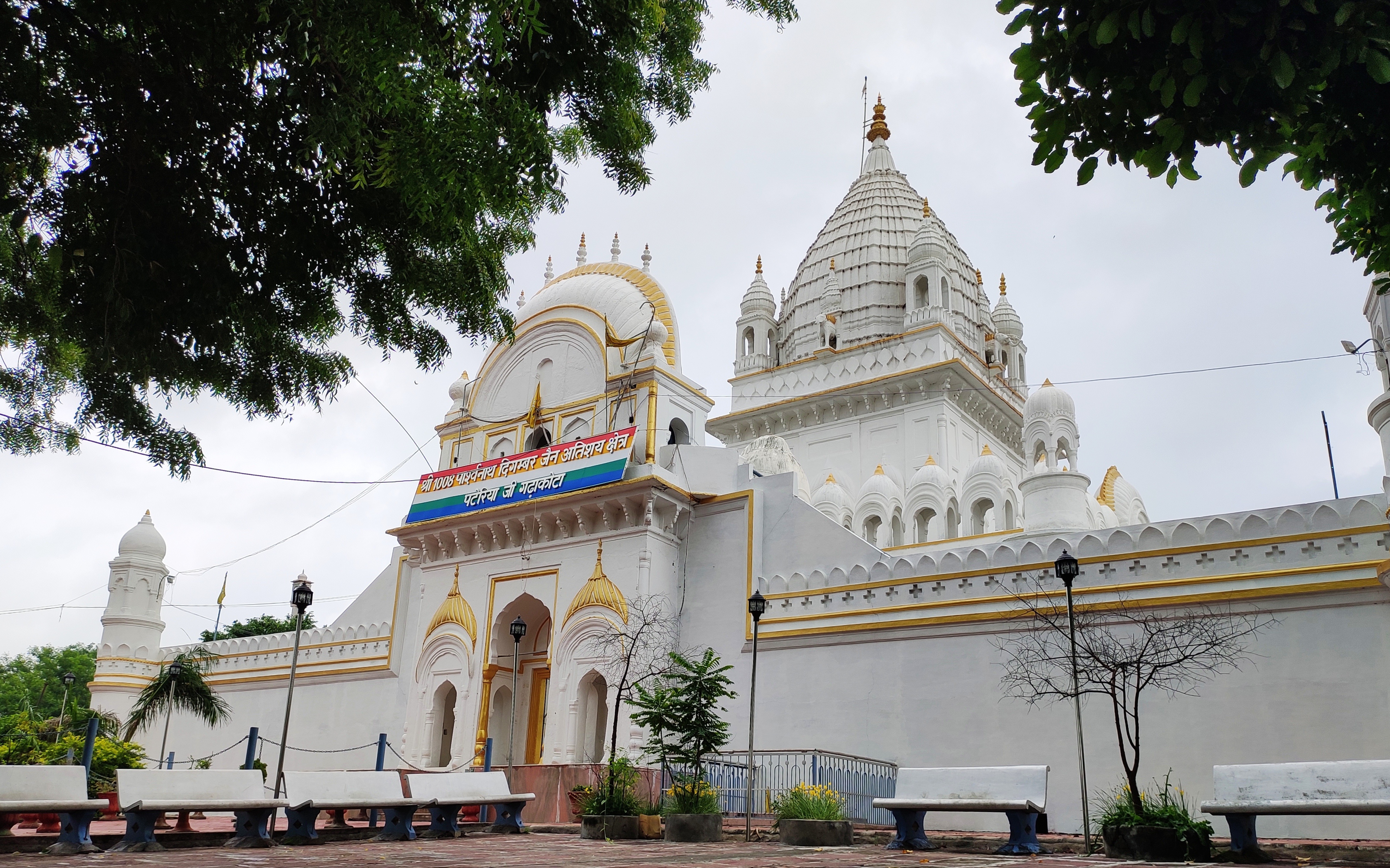
Shree 1008 Parshvanatha Digambar Jain Atishay Kshetra Pateriya Ji

This temple is more than 200 years old. It was built by Seth Radha Kishanjun Shah out of his one-day earnings from the cotton trade in 1782 A.D. (V.S. 1839). The principal deity of Pateria is Lord Parsvanath (The 23rd Teerthankar). This idol is two metres in height in Padmasana posture built with back stone with three serpent hoods. The spire of this temple is 27 metres high surrounded by a thick wall.

=== Shri Dig. Jain Chaudhari Mandir ===
This temple was built in 1891(V.S. 1948), has an eighteen metre high spire. It consists 63 idols, moolnayak of this temple is an idol of Lord Parsvanath with its 1,000 serpent hoods.

=== Shri. Dig. Jain Mahaveer Jinalay ===
Built in 2015, this Jain temple in town Garhakota is considered by many as one of the best Jain temples in Sagar district. In December 2015, a Panchkalyanak, a celebration that hadn't taken place in Garhakota for 250 years, marked the temple's inauguration.

The Mulnayak, the principal deity enshrined within, is none other than Lord Mahaveer, the 24th and final Tirthankar of this era in Jainism. His presence draws pilgrims and devotees to the temple.

The temple owes much to the blessings of Puja Gurudev Shree Kanji Swami, whose spiritual guidance has led to the creation of an infrastructure that sets a benchmark for other temples throughout Sagar district.

=== Garhakota Fort ===
Garhakota Fort has the rivers Sunar and Gadhairi on its two sides. It covers 11 acres. This fort was the residence of the Rajput Kings of Garhakota. During the first freedom struggle of India in 1857, Rani of Jhansi Lakshmi Bai wrote a letter to Raja Mardan Singh Bahadur of Garhakota to prepare against the British troops and to stop them at Sagar. Mardan Singh and Gunthai Pateriya were killed in the battle. The fort was raided and demolished by Sir Hugh Rose in 1858 in the course of Ghadar.

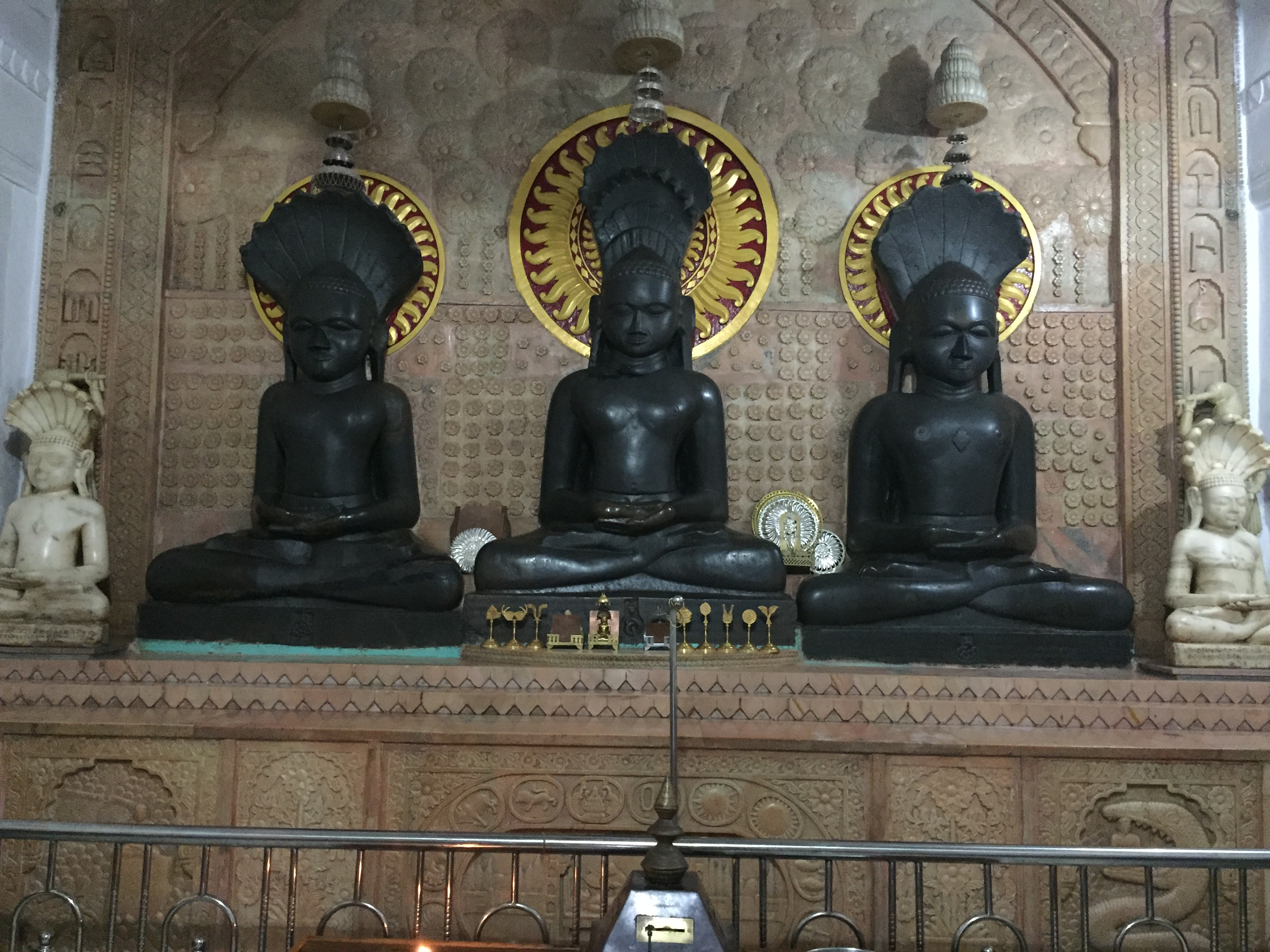
Pateriaji main vedi

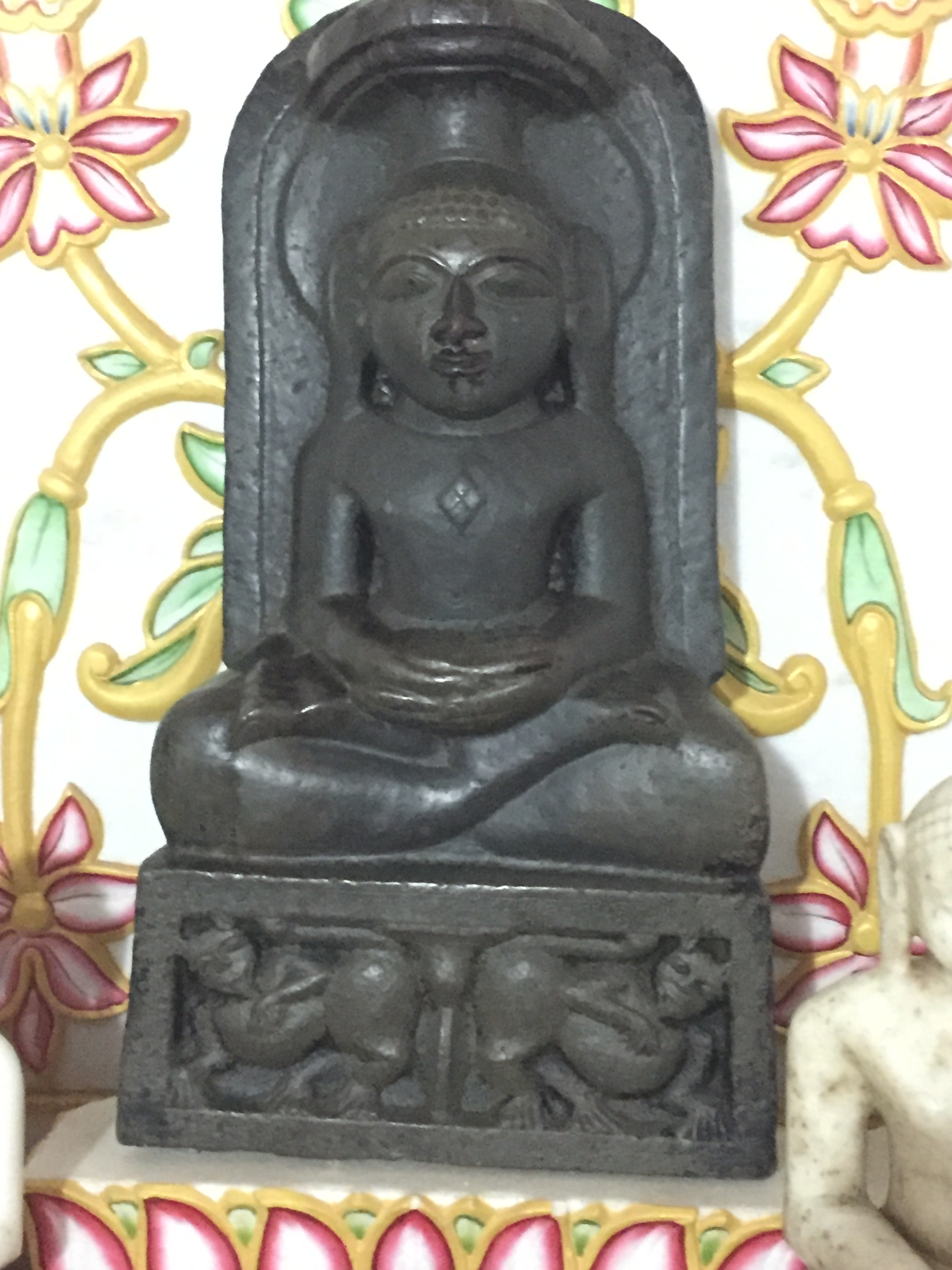
Pateriaji Garbha Griha Bhagwan Mahaveer

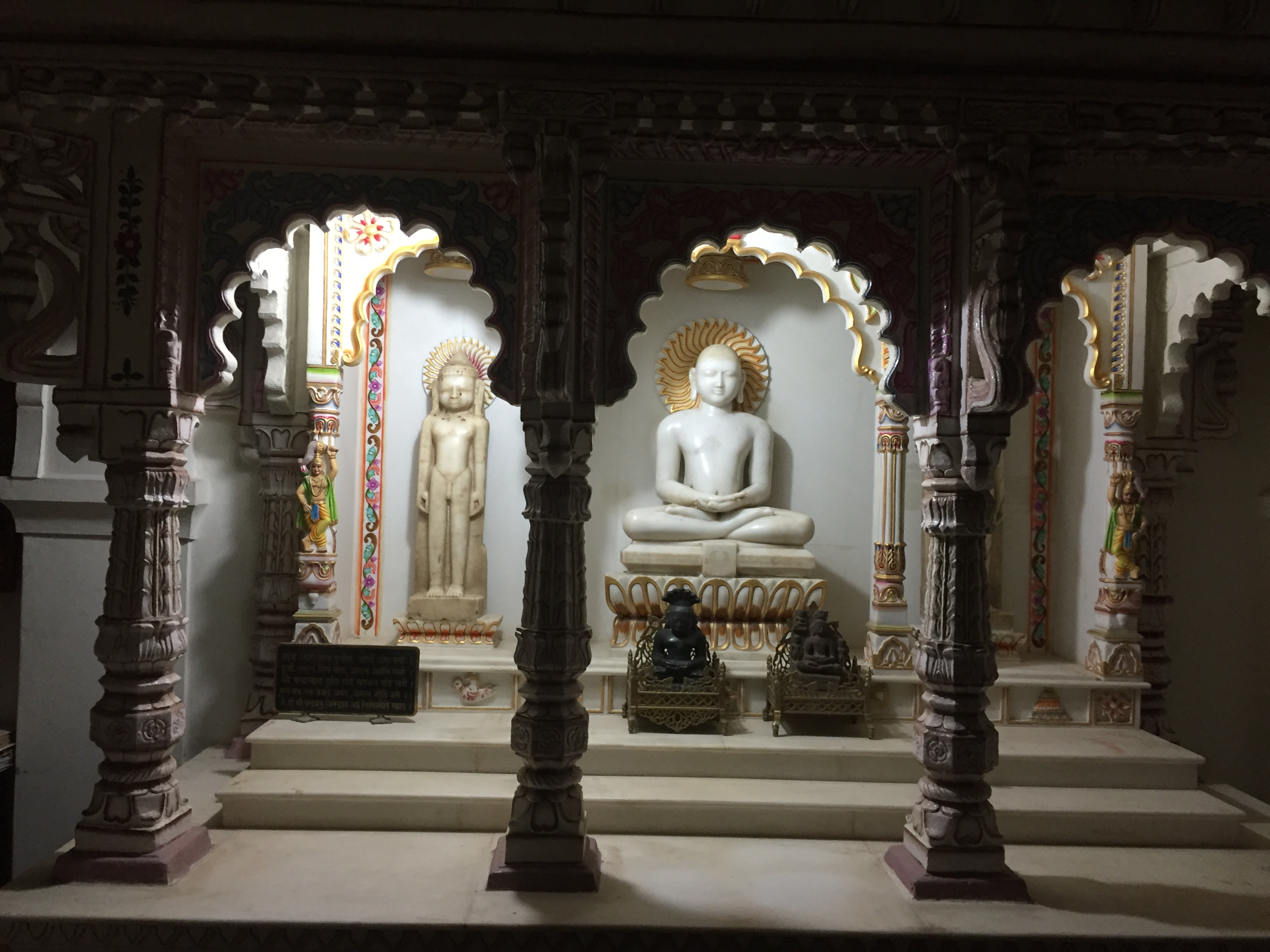
Garhakota Chaudary mandir main vedi

== See also ==
- Rehli
- Sunar River
- Rehli Assembly constituency
