= Deori Assembly constituency =

Constituency of the Madhya Pradesh legislative assembly in India

Coordinates: 23.39°N 79.02°E

Deori
- Constituency No. 38 for the Madhya Pradesh Legislative Assembly

Constituency details
- Country: India
- Region: Central India
- State: Madhya Pradesh
- District: Sagar
- Lok Sabha constituency: Damoh
- Established: 1957
- Reservation: None

Member of Legislative Assembly
- 16th Madhya Pradesh Legislative Assembly
- Incumbent Brij Bihari Pateriya
- Party: Bharatiya Janata Party
- Preceded by: Harsh Yadav

Deori is one of the 230 Vidhan Sabha (Legislative Assembly) constituencies of Madhya Pradesh state in central India. This constituency came into existence in 1957, as one of the Vidhan Sabha constituencies of Damoh Madhya Pradesh state.

== Overview ==
Deori (constituency number 38) is one of the 8 Vidhan Sabha constituencies located in Sagar district. This constituency presently covers the entire Kesli and Deori - tehsils of the district.

Deori is part of Damoh Lok Sabha constituency along with eight other Vidhan Sabha segments, namely, Rehli and Banda in this district, Malhara in Chhatarpur district and Pathariya, Damoh, Jabera and Hatta in Damoh district.

== Members of Legislative Assembly ==
Election	Member	Party
1957	Bala Prasad Mishra	Indian National Congress
1962	Krishna Kumar Gouri Shankar	Praja Socialist Party
1967	Parashuram Sahu	Bharatiya Jana Sangh
1977	Dwarika Prasad Katare	Indian National Congress
1977	Parashuram Sahu	Janata Party
1980	Parashuram Sahu	Bharatiya Janata Party
1985	Bhagwat Singh	Indian National Congress
1990	Parashuram Sahu	Bharatiya Janata Party
1993	Sunil Jain Motilal Jain	Indian National Congress
1998	Brij Bihari Pateriya	Indian National Congress
2003	Ratan Singh Silarpur	Bharatiya Janata Party
2008	Bhanu Rana	Bharatiya Janata Party
2013	Harsh Yadav	Indian National Congress
2018	Harsh Yadav	Indian National Congress
2023	Brij Bihari Pateriya	Bharatiya Janata Party

== Election results ==
=== 2023 ===
2023 Madhya Pradesh Legislative Assembly election: Deori
Party	Candidate	Votes	%	±%
BJP	Brij Bihari Pateriya	94,932	55.17	+10.59
INC	Harsh Yadav	67,709	39.35	−8.14
GGP	Rajat Diwan	3,143	1.83	−1.22
Bharatiya Shakti Chetna Party	Arvindra Dixit	1,709	0.99	
NOTA	None of the above	1,642	0.95	−0.55
Majority		27,223	15.82	+12.91
Turnout		172,067	79.48	+4.69
BJP gain from INC		Swing		

=== 2018 ===
2018 Madhya Pradesh Legislative Assembly election: Deori
Party	Candidate	Votes	%	±%
INC	Harsh Yadav	70,099	47.49	
BJP	Teji Singh Rajpoot	65,795	44.58	
GGP	Ajay Bhanu Shah	4,497	3.05	
BSP	Satynam Singh	1,596	1.08	
Independent	Dr. Devendra Tiwari	1,511	1.02	
NOTA	None of the above	2,218	1.5	
Majority		4,304	2.91	
Turnout		147,601	74.79	
INC hold		Swing		

=== 2013 ===
2013 Madhya Pradesh Legislative Assembly election: Deori
Party	Candidate	Votes	%	±%
INC	Harsh Yadav	71,185	52.00	
BJP	Ratansingh Silarpur	49105	35.87	
JND	Vijendra Devaliya	4090	2.99	
ABGP	Baldwan Singh	3434	2.51	
BSP	Satnam Singh Thakur	1859	1.36	N/A
BSCP	Vinay Kumar Sen	1787	1.31	N/A
Independent	Hemraj Singh	1213	0.89	
Independent	Pavan (Pappu)	1124	0.82	
Independent	Ashok Mishra	811	0.59	
NOTA	None of the Above	2296	1.68	
Majority				
Turnout		136904	72.53	
INC gain from BJP		Swing		

== See also ==
- Deori
- Kesli
