= Hatta Assembly constituency =

Assembly constituency in Madhya Pradesh, India

Coordinates: 24.13°N 79.60°E

Hatta
- Constituency No. 57 for the Madhya Pradesh Legislative Assembly

Constituency details
- Country: India
- Region: Central India
- State: Madhya Pradesh
- District: Damoh
- Lok Sabha constituency: Damoh
- Established: 1951
- Reservation: SC

Member of Legislative Assembly
- 16th Madhya Pradesh Legislative Assembly
- Incumbent Uma Devi Khatik
- Party: Bharatiya Janata Party
- Elected year: 2023
- Preceded by: Purushottam Tantuway Hatta

Hatta is one of the 230 Vidhan Sabha (Legislative Assembly) constituencies of Madhya Pradesh state in central India. This constituency came into existence in 1951, as one of the Vidhan Sabha constituencies of Madhya Pradesh state. This constituency is reserved for the candidates belonging to the Scheduled castes since 2008, following delimitation of the legislative assembly constituencies.

== Overview ==
Hatta (constituency number 57) is one of the 4 Vidhan Sabha constituencies located in Damoh district. This constituency covers the entire Hatta and Patera tehsils, Hindoria nagar panchayat and part of Damoh tehsil of the district.

Hatta is part of Damoh Lok Sabha constituency along with seven other Vidhan Sabha segments, namely, Pathariya, Jabera and Damoh in this district, Deori, Rehli and Banda in Sagar district and Malhara in Chhatarpur district.

== Members of the Legislative Assembly ==
Election	Name	Party
1952	Premshankar Laxmishankar Dhagat	Indian National Congress
1952	Kadora	Indian National Congress
1957	Kadora	Indian National Congress
1957	Gaya Prasad	Indian National Congress
1962	Jugal Kishore Bajaj	Independent politician
1967	Jugal Kishore Bajaj	Indian National Congress
1972	Kunjbiharilal Manmohanla	Indian National Congress
1977	Ramkrishna Kusmaria	Janata Party
1980	Snehsalila Hazari	Indian National Congress (Indira)
1985	Ramkrishna Kusmaria	Bharatiya Janata Party
1990	Ramkrishna Kusmaria	Bharatiya Janata Party
1993	Vijay Singh	Bharatiya Janata Party
1998	Raja Pateria	Indian National Congress
2003	Gangaram Patel	Bharatiya Janata Party
2008	Uma Devi Khatik	Bharatiya Janata Party
2013	Uma Devi Khatik	Bharatiya Janata Party
2018	Purusottam Tantuway Hatta	Bharatiya Janata Party
2023	Uma Devi Khatik	Bharatiya Janata Party

== Election results ==
=== 2023 ===
2023 Madhya Pradesh Legislative Assembly election: Hatta
Party	Candidate	Votes	%	±%
BJP	Uma Devi Khatik	106,546	58.48	+10.07
INC	Pradeep Khatik	49,525	27.18	−8.65
BSP	Bhagwan Das Choudhary	19,362	10.63	+8.07
Bharatiya Shakti Chetna Party	Omvathi Athya	1,983	1.09	
NOTA	None of the above	2,187	1.2	−0.9
Majority		57,021	31.3	+18.72
Turnout		182,195	74.27	+4.27
BJP hold		Swing		

=== 2018 ===
2018 Madhya Pradesh Legislative Assembly election: Hatta
Party	Candidate	Votes	%	±%
BJP	Purusottam Tantuway Hatta	76,607	48.41	
INC	Harishankar Choudhri	56,702	35.83	
Independent	Pradeep Khatik	10,011	6.33	
Bhartiya Shakti Chetna Party	Omvati Athya	4,192	2.65	
BSP	Roshni Ahirwar(Chandrakar)	4,047	2.56	
RLSP	Amol Choudhry	2,109	1.33	
NOTA	None of the above	3,327	2.1	
Majority		19,905	12.58	
Turnout		158,259	70.0	
BJP gain from		Swing		

== See also ==
- Hatta
- Hindoria
- Patera, Damoh
