= Lakhan Patel =

Indian politician

Member of Madhya Pradesh Legislative Assembly
- In office 2013–2018
- Preceded by: Ramkrishna Kusmaria
- Constituency: Pathariya
- Incumbent
- Assumed office 2023
- Preceded by: Rambai Govind Singh
- Constituency: Pathariya

Personal details
- Party: Bharatiya Janata Party
- Profession: Politician

Lakhan Patel is an Indian politician from Madhya Pradesh. He is a two time elected Member of the Madhya Pradesh Legislative Assembly from 2013 and 2023, representing Pathariya Assembly constituency as a Member of the Bharatiya Janata Party.

== Political career ==
In the 2013 Madhya Pradesh Legislative Assembly election, Patel was nominated by the Bharatiya Janata Party to contest from the Pathariya Assembly constituency. He faced Indian National Congress candidate Kunvar Pushpendra Singh Hazari and won by a narrow margin of 7,315 votes, securing a total of 60,083 votes, while Hazari received 52,768 votes.

In the 2018 Madhya Pradesh Assembly election, Patel again contested from the BJP but lost to Bahujan Samaj Party candidate Rambai Govind Singh by a margin of 2,205 votes. Patel received 37,062 votes, while Singh secured 39,267 votes.

In the 2023 Assembly election, Patel once again ran on a BJP ticket and won, defeating INC candidate Rao Brajendra Singh by a margin of 18,159 votes, with Patel receiving 82,603 votes and Singh securing 64,444 votes.

== See also ==
- 2023 Madhya Pradesh Legislative Assembly election
- Madhya Pradesh Legislative Assembly
