= Jabera Assembly constituency =

Constituency of the Madhya Pradesh legislative assembly in India

Coordinates: 23.56°N 79.67°E

Jabera
- Constituency No. 56 for the Madhya Pradesh Legislative Assembly

Constituency details
- Country: India
- Region: Central India
- State: Madhya Pradesh
- District: Damoh
- Lok Sabha constituency: Damoh
- Established: 2008
- Reservation: None

Member of Legislative Assembly
- 16th Madhya Pradesh Legislative Assembly
- Incumbent Dharmendra Singh Lodhi
- Party: Bharatiya Janata Party
- Elected year: 2023
- Preceded by: Pratap Singh

Jabera Assembly constituency is one of the 230 Vidhan Sabha (Legislative Assembly) constituencies of Madhya Pradesh state in central India. This constituency came into existence in 2008, following delimitation of the legislative assembly constituencies. Before delimitation, the area covered by this constituency was part of the erstwhile Nohata constituency abolished in 2008.

== Overview ==
Jabera (constituency number 56) is one of the 4 Vidhan Sabha constituencies located in Damoh district. This constituency covers the entire Jabera and Tendukhera tehsils of the district.

Jabera is part of Damoh Lok Sabha constituency along with seven other Vidhan Sabha segments, namely, Pathariya, Damoh and Hatta in this district, Deori, Rehli and Banda in Sagar district and Malhara in Chhatarpur district.

== Members of Legislative Assembly ==
Election	Member	Party
2008	Ratnesh Soloman	Indian National Congress
2010 (Note: by-poll)	Dashrath Singh	Bharatiya Janata Party
2013	Pratap Singh	Indian National Congress
2018	Dharmendra Singh Lodhi	Bharatiya Janata Party
2023	Dharmendra Singh Lodhi	Bharatiya Janata Party

== Election results ==
=== 2023 ===
2023 Madhya Pradesh Legislative Assembly election: Jabera
Party	Candidate	Votes	%	±%
BJP	Dharmendra Singh Lodhi	72,249	37.21	+8.16
INC	Pratap Singh	56,366	29.03	+2.05
GGP	Vinod Rai	52,657	27.12	+20.89
Bharatiya Shakti Chetna Party	Sujan Singh Thakur	6,108	3.15	
NOTA	None of the above	2,023	1.04	−0.3
Majority		15,883	8.18	+6.11
Turnout		194,154	81.13	+4.03
BJP hold		Swing		

=== 2018 ===
2018 Madhya Pradesh Legislative Assembly election: Jaitpur
Party	Candidate	Votes	%	±%
BJP	Dharmendra Singh Lodhi	48,901	29.05	
INC	Pratap Singh	45,416	26.98	
Independent	Raghvendra Singh (Rishi Bhaiya)	21,751	12.92	
Independent	Aditya Ratnesh Solomon	13,015	7.73	
GGP	Arvind Pratap Singh Judev	10,490	6.23	
BSP	Delan Singh Dhurve	10,355	6.15	
Bhartiya Shakti Chetna Party	Ashish Shukla	8,444	5.02	
Independent	Uttam Bhaiya	3,039	1.81	
NOTA	None of the above	2,264	1.34	
Majority		3,485	2.07	
Turnout		168,338	77.1	
BJP gain from INC		Swing		

== See also ==
- Damoh district
