= Rehli Assembly constituency =

Assembly constituency in Madhya Pradesh, India

Coordinates: 23.64°N 79.06°E

Rehli
- Constituency No. 39 for the Madhya Pradesh Legislative Assembly

Constituency details
- Country: India
- Region: Central India
- State: Madhya Pradesh
- District: Sagar
- Lok Sabha constituency: Damoh
- Established: 1951
- Reservation: None

Member of Legislative Assembly
- 16th Madhya Pradesh Legislative Assembly
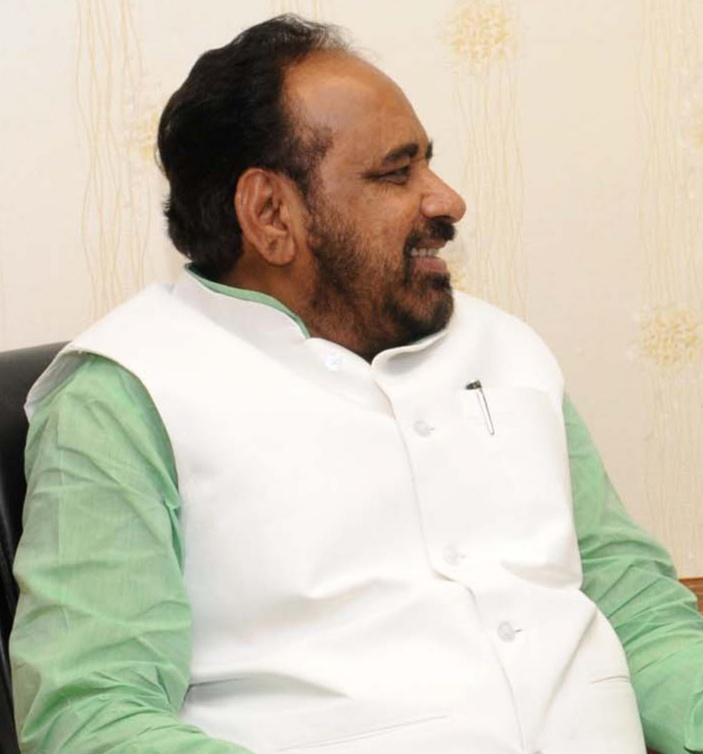
- Incumbent Gopal Bhargava
- Party: Bharatiya Janata Party
- Elected year: 2023
- Preceded by: Mahadev Prasad Hazari

Rehli is one of the 230 Vidhan Sabha (Legislative Assembly) constituencies of Madhya Pradesh state in central India. This constituency came into existence in 1951, as one of the Vidhan Sabha constituencies of Madhya Pradesh state.

== Overview ==
Rehli (constituency number 39) is one of the 8 Vidhan Sabha constituencies located in Sagar district. This constituency presently covers the entire Rehli And Garhakota tehsil of the district.

Rehli is part of Damoh Lok Sabha constituency along with seven other Vidhan Sabha segments, namely, Deori and Banda in Sagar district, Malhara in Chhatarpur district and Pathariya, Damoh, Jabera and Hatta in Damoh district.

Since 1985, this constituency has been the seat of minister Gopal Bhargava, who has won 9 elections from the constituency.

== Members of Legislative Assembly ==
Year	Member	Party
1952	Balaprasad Balaji	Indian National Congress
1957	Manibhai J. Patel	Indian National Congress
1962	Manibhai J. Patel	Indian National Congress
1967	N. P. Tiwari	Bharatiya Jana Sangh
1972	Gourishankar Pathak	Indian National Congress
1977	Mahadev Prasad Hazari	Indian National Congress
1980	Mahadev Prasad Hazari	Indian National Congress (Indira)
1985	Gopal Bhargava	Bharatiya Janata Party
1990	Gopal Bhargava	Bharatiya Janata Party
1993	Gopal Bhargava	Bharatiya Janata Party
1998	Gopal Bhargava	Bharatiya Janata Party
2003	Gopal Bhargava	Bharatiya Janata Party
2008	Gopal Bhargava	Bharatiya Janata Party
2013	Gopal Bhargava	Bharatiya Janata Party
2018	Gopal Bhargava	Bharatiya Janata Party
2023	Gopal Bhargava	Bharatiya Janata Party

== Election results ==
=== 2023 ===
2023 Madhya Pradesh Legislative Assembly election: Rehli
Party	Candidate	Votes	%	±%
BJP	Gopal Bhargava	130,916	67.04	+11.26
INC	Jyoti Patel	58,116	29.76	−9.91
NOTA	None of the above	1,801	0.92	−0.34
Majority		72,800	37.28	+21.17
Turnout		195,286	80.18	+3.57
BJP hold		Swing		

=== 2018 ===
2018 Madhya Pradesh Legislative Assembly election: Rehli
Party	Candidate	Votes	%	±%
BJP	Gopal Bhargava	94,305	55.78	
INC	Kamlesh Sahu	67,063	39.67	
Independent	Simarani	1,716	1.01	
NOTA	None of the above	2,131	1.26	
Majority		27,242	16.11	
Turnout		169,068	76.61	
BJP gain from		Swing		

== See also ==
- Sagar district
