= Pathariya Assembly constituency =

Assembly constituency in Madhya Pradesh, India

Coordinates: 23.90°N 79.20°E

Pathariya
- Constituency No. 54 for the Madhya Pradesh Legislative Assembly

Constituency details
- Country: India
- Region: Central India
- State: Madhya Pradesh
- District: Damoh
- Lok Sabha constituency: Damoh
- Established: 1961
- Reservation: None

Member of Legislative Assembly
- 16th Madhya Pradesh Legislative Assembly
- Incumbent Lakhan Patel
- Party: Bahujan Samaj Party
- Elected year: 2023
- Preceded by: Rambai Govind Singh

Pathariya Assembly constituency (formerly Patharia) is one of the 230 Vidhan Sabha (Legislative Assembly) constituencies of Madhya Pradesh state in central India. This constituency came into existence in 1961, following delimitation of the legislative assembly constituencies. It was reserved for the candidates belonging to the Scheduled castes from 1961 to 2008.

== Overview ==
Pathariya (constituency number 54) is one of the 4 Vidhan Sabha constituencies located in Damoh district. This constituency covers the entire Batiyagarh and Patharia tehsils of the district.

Pathariya is part of Damoh Lok Sabha constituency along with seven other Vidhan Sabha segments, namely, Damoh, Jabera and Hatta in this district, Deori, Rehli and Banda in Sagar district and Malhara in Chhatarpur district.

== Members of Legislative Assembly ==
Year	Member	Party
1962	Rameshwar	Independent politician
1967	K. Bhaosingh	Indian National Congress
1972	Gopal Das Munnilal	Indian National Congress
1977	Jiwan Lal Kanchhadilal	Janata Party
1980	Gopal Das Munnilal	Indian National Congress (Indira)
1985	Shyamlal	Indian National Congress
1990	Mani Shankar Suman	Bharatiya Janata Party
1993	Kaluram	Indian National Congress
1998	Ganeshram Khatik	Bharatiya Janata Party
2003	Sonabai Ahirwar	Bharatiya Janata Party
2008	Ramkrishna Kusmaria	Bharatiya Janata Party
2013	Lakhan Patel	Bharatiya Janata Party
2018	Rambai Govind Singh	Bahujan Samaj Party
2023	Lakhan Patel	Bharatiya Janata Party

== Election results ==
=== 2023 ===
2023 Madhya Pradesh Legislative Assembly election: Pathariya
Party	Candidate	Votes	%	±%
BJP	Lakhan Patel	82,603	44.09	+21.5
INC	Rao Brajendra Singh	64,444	34.4	+18.89
BSP	Rambai Singh	29,339	15.66	−8.28
Bharatiya Shakti Chetna Party	Kallan Kurmi	2,613	1.39	
Independent	Rajendra Singh Thakur	1,711	0.91	
NOTA	None of the above	712	0.38	+0.09
Majority		18,159	9.69	+8.34
Turnout		187,352	78.97	+3.54
BJP gain from BSP		Swing		

=== 2018 ===
2018 Madhya Pradesh Legislative Assembly election: Pathariya
Party	Candidate	Votes	%	±%
BSP	Rambai Govind Singh	39,267	23.94	
BJP	Lakhan Patel	37,062	22.59	
Independent	Rao Brajendra Singh	27,074	16.5	
INC	Gourav Patel	25,438	15.51	
Independent	Ramkrishna Kusmaria	8,755	5.34	
SP	Anurag Vardhan Singh Hazari	7,827	4.77	
Bhartiya Shakti Chetna Party	Choti Bahu Lodhi	3,744	2.28	
Independent	Bhushan Singh	2,577	1.57	
AAP	Chandra Mohan Guru	2,279	1.39	
NOTA	None of the above	468	0.29	
Majority		2,205	1.35	
Turnout		164,053	75.43	
BSP gain from BJP		Swing		

== See also ==
- Patharia

2019: Rambai Singh Parihar : BSP
