= Chandrabhan Bhaiya =

Indian politician

Chandrabhan Bhaiya (born 1 May 1956) was a member of the 14th Lok Sabha of India. He represented the Damoh constituency of Madhya Pradesh and was a member of the Bharatiya Janata Party (BJP) political party. Later he joined the Indian National Congress Party (INC) and fought MP Legislative Assembly election on Congress ticket against BJP's Jayant Malaiya and lost the same by few hundred votes.

== See also ==
- 2008 Lok Sabha vote of confidence
