= Brijbihari Pateriya =

Indian politician

Brijbihari Pateriya (born 1961) is an Indian politician from Madhya Pradesh, India. He is an MLA of Bharatiya Janata Party from Deori Assembly constituency of Sagar district.

He won the 2023 Madhya Pradesh Legislative Assembly election by defeating 2-time MLA Harsh Yadav of Indian National Congress. From 1998 to 2003, Brijbihari served as the MLA of Deori representing the Congress party.

In 2022, he joined the BJP, resulting in the BJP gaining the Deori seat, which had been held by the Congress. Pateriya received a total of 94,932 votes and won with the margin of 27,223 votes.

== See also ==
- Deori Assembly constituency
