= Damoh Assembly constituency =

Constituency of the Madhya Pradesh legislative assembly in India

Coordinates: 23.83°N 79.44°E

Damoh
- Constituency for the Madhya Pradesh Legislative Assembly

Constituency details
- Country: India
- Region: Central India
- State: Madhya Pradesh
- District: Damoh
- Lok Sabha constituency: Damoh
- Established: 1951
- Reservation: None

Member of Legislative Assembly
- 16th Madhya Pradesh Legislative Assembly
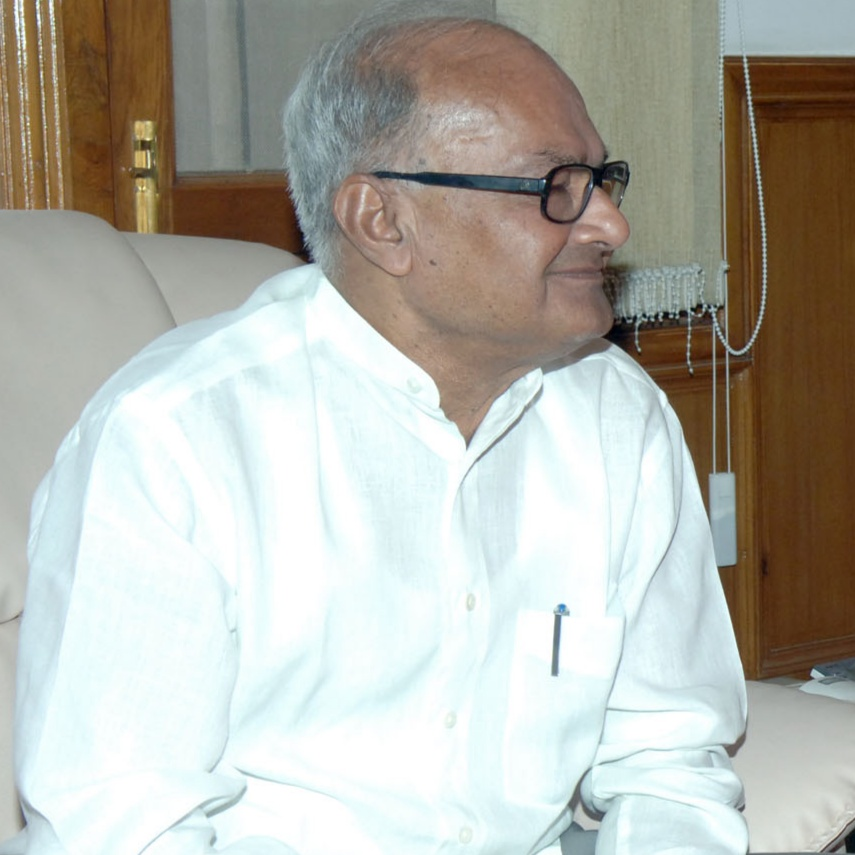
- Incumbent Jayant Kumar Malaiya
- Party: Bharatiya Janata Party
- Elected year: 2023
- Preceded by: Ajay Tandon

Damoh Assembly constituency is one of the 230 Vidhan Sabha (Legislative Assembly) constituencies of Madhya Pradesh state in central India. This constituency came into existence in 1951, as one of the Vidhan Sabha constituencies of Madhya Pradesh state.

== Overview ==
Damoh (constituency number 55) is one of the 4 Vidhan Sabha constituencies located in Damoh district. This constituency covers the Damoh municipality and part of Damoh tehsil of the district.

Damoh is part of Damoh Lok Sabha constituency along with seven other Vidhan Sabha segments, namely, Pathariya, Jabera and Hatta in this district, Deori, Rehli and Banda in Sagar district and Malhara in Chhatarpur district.

== Members of Legislative Assembly ==
Year	Member	Party
1951	Harichandra Laxmichandra Marothi	Indian National Congress
1957	Harichandra Laxmichandra Marothi	Indian National Congress
1962	Anand Kumar Shrivastava	Independent
1967	Prabhu Narain Tandon	Indian National Congress
1972	Anand Kumar Shrivastava	Independent
1977	Prabhu Narain Tandon	Indian National Congress
1980	Chandranarayan Ramdhan	Indian National Congress (Indira)
1985	Mukesh Nayak	Indian National Congress
1990	Jayant Malaiya	Bharatiya Janata Party
1993	Jayant Malaiya	Bharatiya Janata Party
1998	Jayant Malaiya	Bharatiya Janata Party
2003	Jayant Malaiya	Bharatiya Janata Party
2008	Jayant Malaiya	Bharatiya Janata Party
2013	Jayant Malaiya	Bharatiya Janata Party
2018	Rahul Lodhi	Indian National Congress
2021	Ajay Tandon	Indian National Congress
2023	Jayant Malaiya	Bharatiya Janata Party

By-election due to Rahul Lodhi resigning from the Congress party, to join the BJP

== Election results ==
=== 2023 ===
2023 Madhya Pradesh Legislative Assembly election: Damoh
Party	Candidate	Votes	%	±%
BJP	Jayant Kumar Malaiya	112,278	59.79	+19.45
INC	Ajay Tandon	60,927	32.44	−19.84
BSP	Pratap Rohit (Ahirwar)	3,178	1.69	
Bharatiya Shakti Chetna Party	Dolat Singh Lodhi	2,493	1.33	−1.31
AAP	Chahat Pandey	2,292	1.22	
NOTA	None of the above	528	0.28	−0.22
Majority		51,351	27.35	+15.41
Turnout		187,801	76.4	+16.75
BJP gain from INC		Swing		

=== 2021 ===
By-election, 2021: Damoh
Party	Candidate	Votes	%	±%
INC	Ajay Tandon	74,832	52.28	
BJP	Rahul Singh Lodhi	57,735	40.34	
Bhartiya Shakti Chetna Party	Uma Singh Lodhi	3775	2.64	
NOTA	None of the above	720	0.5	−0.24
Majority		17,097	11.94	+11.48
Turnout		143,124	59.65	−15.46
INC hold		Swing		

=== 2018 ===
2018 Madhya Pradesh Legislative Assembly election: Damoh
Party	Candidate	Votes	%	±%
INC	Rahul Singh Lodhi	78,997	45.05	
BJP	Jayant Kumar Malaiya	78,199	44.59	
BSP	Komal Ahirwar	5,460	3.11	
Bhartiya Shakti Chetna Party	Aarti Singh	3,443	1.96	
Independent	Rahul Singh	1,755	1.0	
Independent	Rahul Yadav	1,570	0.9	
NOTA	None of the above	1,299	0.74	
Majority		798	0.46	
Turnout		175,372	75.11	
