= Ganeshram Khatik =

Indian politician

Ganeshram Khatik was an Indian politician and member of the Legislative Assembly. He belonged to Bharatiya Janata Party and represented Pathariya Assembly Constituency from 1998 to 2003.
