= Uma Devi Khatik =

Indian politician

Umadevi Lalchand Khatik is an Indian politician and member of Legislative Assembly of Madhya Pradesh. She represents the Hatta constituency of Madhya Pradesh and is a member of the Bharatiya Janata Party political party.

== Early life and education ==
She completed 12th class in 2006.

== Political career ==
Uma Devi Khatik is a member of the Legislative Assembly. She represents the Hatta constituency of Madhya Pradesh and is a member of the Bharatiya Janata Party political party.
