= Banda, Madhya Pradesh Assembly constituency =

Assembly constituency in Madhya Pradesh, India

Coordinates: 24.039°N 78.963°E

Banda
- Constituency No. 42 for the Madhya Pradesh Legislative Assembly

Constituency details
- Country: India
- Region: Central India
- State: Madhya Pradesh
- District: Sagar
- Lok Sabha constituency: Damoh
- Established: 1951
- Reservation: None

Member of Legislative Assembly
- 16th Madhya Pradesh Legislative Assembly
- Incumbent Veerendra Singh Lodhi
- Party: Bharatiya Janata Party
- Preceded by: Tarvar Lodhi

Banda Assembly constituency is one of the 230 Vidhan Sabha (Legislative Assembly) constituencies of Madhya Pradesh state in central India. This constituency came into existence in 1951, as one of the Vidhan Sabha constituencies of Madhya Pradesh state.

== Overview ==
Banda (constituency number 42) is one of the 8 Vidhan Sabha constituencies located in Sagar district. This constituency presently covers the entire Banda and Shahgarh tehsil of the district.

Banda is part of Damoh Lok Sabha constituency along with seven other Vidhan Sabha segments, namely, Deori and Rehli in this district, Malhara in Chhatarpur district and Pathariya, Damoh, Jabera and Hatta in Damoh district.

== Members of Legislative Assembly ==
Election	Name	Party
1952	Swami Krishnanand Ramcharan	Indian National Congress
1957	Swami Krishnanand Ramcharan	Indian National Congress
1962	Ramcharan Pujari	Bharatiya Jana Sangh
1967	Ramcharan Pujari	Bharatiya Jana Sangh
1972	Shri Krishna Selat	Indian National Congress
1977	Shivraj Singh	Janata Party
1980	Premnarayan Gorelal	Indian National Congress (Indira)
1985	Harnam Singh Rathore	Bharatiya Janata Party
1990	Harnam Singh Rathore	Bharatiya Janata Party
1993	Santosh Kumar Sahu	Indian National Congress
1998	Harnam Singh Rathore	Bharatiya Janata Party
2003	Harnam Singh Rathore	Bharatiya Janata Party
2008	Narayan Prajapati	Indian National Congress
2013	Harvansh Singh Rathore	Bharatiya Janata Party
2018	Tarvar Lodhi	Indian National Congress
2023	Veerendra Singh Lodhi	Bharatiya Janata Party

== Election results ==
=== 2023 ===
2023 Madhya Pradesh Legislative Assembly election: Banda
Party	Candidate	Votes	%	±%
BJP	Veerendra Singh Lodhi	90,911	46.83	+9.75
INC	Tarvar Lodhi	56,160	28.93	−23.02
AAP	Sudhir Yadav	24,492	12.62	+12.41
BSP	Ranjor Singh Bundela	13,765	7.09	+2.24
Independent	Veerendra Singh Lodhi	2,250	1.16	
NOTA	None of the above	1,409	0.73	−0.67
Majority		34,751	17.9	+3.03
Turnout		194,130	78.22	+3.55
BJP gain from INC		Swing		

=== 2018 ===
2018 Madhya Pradesh Legislative Assembly election: Banda
Party	Candidate	Votes	%	±%
INC	Tarvar Lodhi	84,456	51.95	
BJP	Harvansh Singh Rathore	60,292	37.08	
BSP	Aheer Ramakant Yadav	7,890	4.85	
Bhartiya Shakti Chetna Party	Pushpend Singh	2,789	1.72	
NOTA	None of the above	2,273	1.4	
Majority		24,164	14.87	
Turnout		162,578	74.67	
INC gain from		Swing		

== See also ==
- Sagar district
