= Rahul Lodhi =

Indian politician

Rahul Singh Lodhi

Member of Parliament, Lok Sabha
- Incumbent
- Assumed office 2024
- Preceded by: Prahlad Singh Patel
- Constituency: Damoh

Member of Madhya Pradesh Legislative Assembly
- In office 2018–2020
- Preceded by: Jayant Malaiya
- Succeeded by: Ajay Kumar Tandon
- Constituency: Damoh

Personal details
- Party: Bharatiya Janata Party
- Other political affiliations: Indian National Congress
- Education: 12th Pass
- Profession: Agriculturist

Rahul Singh Lodhi (Hindi pronunciation: [ɾaːɦʊl loːd̪ʱiː]) is an Indian politician from Bharatiya Janata Party and was a member of the Madhya Pradesh Legislative Assembly from Damoh. He was in the Indian National Congress and he defeated Jayant Malaiya of Bharatiya Janata Party by 798 votes in 2018 election. Lodhi joined BJP in October 2020 and was given a ticket for 2021 by-election where he was defeated by Congress's Ajay Kumar Tandon by 17,097 votes.

In 2024 Lok Sabha Election Rahul Singh Lodhi won by 406426 votes. He defeated INC's Tarvar Lodhi.

== See also ==
- Tarvar Lodhi
