= Shivraj Singh Lodhi =

Indian politician

Shivraj Singh Lodhi (8 October 1943 – 18 May 2021) was an Indian politician, belonging to the Bhartiya Janata Party.

He served as a member of the Lok Sabha for the Damoh constituency of Madhya Pradesh from 2009 to 2014.

He previously served as a member of the Madhya Pradesh Legislative Assembly from 1974 to 1980 and from 1984 till 1989.

He was married to Smt Ahilya Bai, with whom he had four sons and three daughters.

Lodhi died from COVID-19 on 18 May 2021 aged 78.
