= Harsh Yadav =

Indian politician

Minister of Cottage, Rural Industries and New Renewable Energy, Madhya Pradesh Government
- In office December 2018 – March 2020
- Preceded by: Paras Chandra Jain; Antar Singh Arya

Member of Legislative Assembly from Madhya Pradesh
- Incumbent
- Assumed office 2013
- Preceded by: Bhanu Rana
- Constituency: Deori

Personal details
- Born: 31 May 1963 (age 62)
- Citizenship: India
- Party: Indian National Congress
- Spouse: Ranjana Yadav
- Education: LLB
- Profession: Politician
- As of 27 July, 2018 Source: ["Harsh Yadav Biography" (PDF). Vidhan Sabha, Madhya Pradesh Legislative Assembly.]

Harsh Yadav (born 31 May 1961) is ex. Cabinet Minister of Cottage & Rural Industries, New Renewable Energy of Madhya Pradesh and the Member of Legislative Assembly from Deori Vidhan Sabha in Madhya Pradesh. He is the member of the INC.

== Political career ==
He was the chairman of Janpad Panchayat Deori from 2000 to 2005. He also held various posts in Yadav Mahasabha such as vice-president and district president. He became an MLA in 2013 for the first time from Deori. He also won in 2018 Vidhansabha election for second term. On 25 December 2018 he took oath as Cabinet minister in Madhya Pradesh Government headed by C.M Shri Kamalnath.

== See also ==
- Madhya Pradesh Legislative Assembly
- 2013 Madhya Pradesh Legislative Assembly election
