= Pratap Singh (Madhya Pradesh politician) =

Indian politician

Member of the Madhya Pradesh Legislative Assembly
- Incumbent
- Assumed office 2013
- Constituency: Jabera

Personal details
- Born: 1 July 1961 (age 64) Village Bairagarh, Teh. Tendukheda, Damoh
- Party: Indian National Congress
- Spouse: Kusum Singh
- Education: SSC
- Profession: Politician
- As of 27 July, 2018 Source: ["Biography:Singh, Pratap" (PDF). Vidhan Sabha, Madhya Pradesh Legislative Assembly.]

Pratap Singh is an Indian politician and a member of the Indian National Congress party.

== Political career ==
He became an MLA for the first time in 2013.

== Legal Affairs ==
His son-in-law had tried to encroach upon a land of a local farmer, who in retaliation fired bullets on him, leading to a brawl and arrests.

== See also ==
- Madhya Pradesh Legislative Assembly
- 2013 Madhya Pradesh Legislative Assembly election
