= Gopal Bhargava =

Indian politician (born 1952)

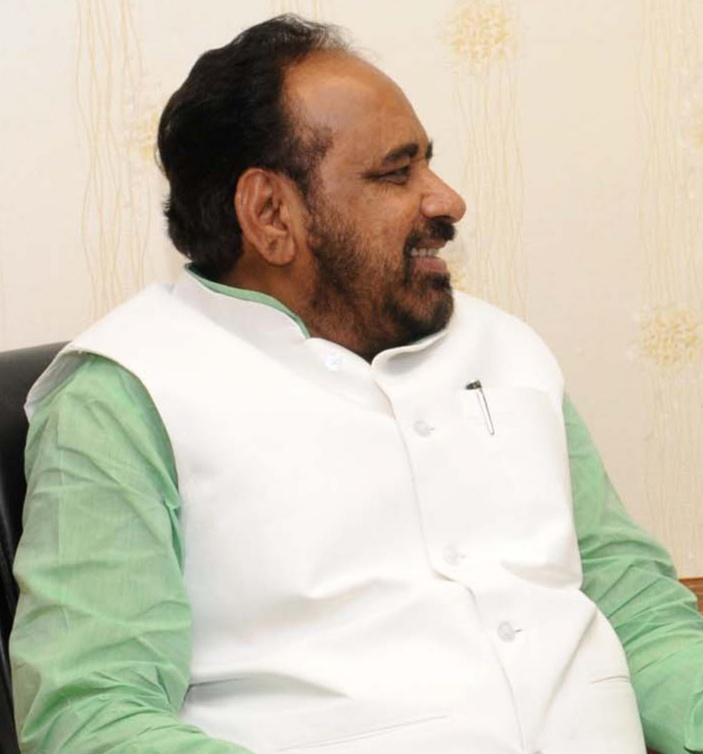

Cabinet Minister Government of Madhya Pradesh
- Ministry: Term
- Minister of Public Works Department Minister of Cottage & Rural Industry: 2 July 2020 - 12 December 2023
- In office 21 December 2013 – 12 December 2018
- Ministry: Term
- Minister of Rural Development Minister of Co-operation Minister of Social Justice: 21 December 2013 – 12 December 2018
- In office 20 December 2008 – 9 December 2013
- Ministry: Term
- Minister of Rural Development: 20 December 2008 – 9 December 2013
- Minister of Social Justice: 1 November 2009 – 9 December 2013
- In office 8 December 2003 – 10 December 2008
- Ministry: Term
- Minister of Agriculture: 8 December 200 3–10 December 2008
- Minister of Food, Civil Supplies & Consumer Affairs: 8 December 2003 – 4 December 2005
- Minister of Co-operation: 8 December 2003 – 10 December 2008
- Minister of Revenue Minister of Religious Trusts & Endowments: 8 December 2003 – 4 December 2005

Leader of the Opposition Madhya Pradesh Legislative Assembly
- In office 7 January 2019 – 23 March 2020
- Chief Minister: Kamal Nath
- Preceded by: Ajay Arjun Singh
- Succeeded by: Kamal Nath

Member, Madhya Pradesh Legislative Assembly
- Incumbent
- Assumed office 1985
- Preceded by: Mahadev Prasad Manoharlal
- Constituency: Rehli

Personal details
- Born: 1 July 1952 (age 74) Garhakota, Madhya Pradesh, India
- Party: Bharatiya Janata Party
- Spouse: Rekha Bhargava
- Children: Abhishek Gopal Bhargava; 3 Daughters
- Parent(s): Sushila Devi Bhargava; Shankarlal Bhargava
- Website: www.gopalbhargava.in

Gopal Bhargava (born 1 July 1952) is an Indian politician and currently senior most legislator and was cabinet minister in the Government of Madhya Pradesh. He has served as a cabinet minister for his six terms, which is the highest number of terms any minister could complete in the government. He has also been the leader of opposition in the 15th Madhya Pradesh Legislative Assembly. He is the only person who has served as a cabinet minister for 15 consecutive years in the Government of Madhya Pradesh, India. He belongs to the Bharatiya Janata Party, and has been the member of the Legislative Assembly nine times consecutively, representing Rehli since 1985. He is only MLA in History of Madhya Pradesh to win 9 consecutive elections from same constituency. He has become second most senior legislator in Madhya Pradesh history after EX-CM Babulal Gaur. He is also elected as Pro tem Speaker of 16th Madhya Pradesh Legislative Assembly.

== Early life and education ==
Bhargava was born on 1 July 1952, to Pandit Shankarlal Bhargava (Kakkaji). His grandfather was a social activist and leader. He started his primary education at his hometown Garhakota and later moved to Sagar for his higher education. Bhargava holds a degree in B.Sc., MA (Political Science) and has completed LLB (Law) from Dr. H.S. Gour University, Sagar.

== Political career ==
His political career started with his first election to the Municipal Council in Garhakota. He was the president of the students union at the Government Boys Higher Secondary School, Garhakota, in 1965. In 1984–85, he participated in a youth movement for a college building and was imprisoned in Sagar Jail for some time.

He was first elected as president to the Garhakota Municipal Council in 1980 and then as a Member of the Legislative Assembly from Rehli in 1984. In 2003, Bhargava was chosen to become the cabinet minister in Government of Madhya Pradesh led by Uma Bharti. He also became President of MP Agro-Development Corporation, President of MP Agriculture Board, President of State Warehousing Corporation, President of MP state civil supplies corporation, President of Apex Bank MP and many other departments.

In 2008, he was sworn in as cabinet minister of Panchayat & Rural Development, Social Justice in the Government of Madhya Pradesh led by Shivraj Singh Chouhan.

He is not fond of any personal campaigning while contesting in election so he didn't make any personal campaign for himself in his constituency 2013 onwards.

In 2013, Gopal Bhargava retained the Rehli Vidhan Sabha seat by over 52,000 votes and led the Bharatiya Janata Party (BJP) to a third consecutive victory. On 12 December 2013, he was sworn in for his third consecutive term as senior most cabinet minister and again took charge of Panchayat & Rural Development, Social Justice & Co-operative.

In 2018, he was re-elected from Rehli and became the most senior legislator in Madhya Pradesh Vidhan Sabha.

On 7 January 2019, he was elected Leader of the Opposition in the 15th Madhya Pradesh Legislative Assembly. He resigned as leader of the opposition after the BJP formed a government in Madhya Pradesh on 23 March 2020. He was inducted into Shivraj Singh Chauhan's cabinet on 2 July 2020, and was given the portfolio of Public Works Department and Cottage & Rural Industries.

In 2023 he won again 9th consecutive time by huge margin of over 72800 votes, became first person in Madhya Pradesh to do such from same constituency. His this victory is record highest margin for any minister to retain his seat in Madhya Pradesh.

He is still undefeated in his electoral career spanning over 4 decades. He has won his all 10 election in which he contested.

On 14 December 2023 he was chosen as pro tem Speaker of 16th Madhya Pradesh Legislative Assembly

== Personal life ==
Bhargava has been married to Rekha Bhargava since 1981. They have one son and three daughter.

His son Abhishek Gopal Bhargava is a politician, was the state vice president of Bharatiya Janata Yuva Morcha in Madhya Pradesh, and oversees and manages his work in his constituency.
