= Rehli =

City in Sagar (Madhya Pradesh), India

- city
- Rehli
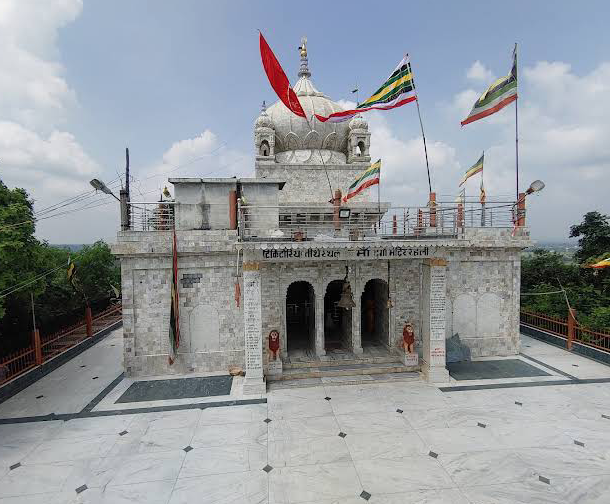
- Tikitoriya Temple, Rehli

- Location in Madhya Pradesh, India Rehli (India)
- Coordinates: 23.63°N 79.08°E
- Country: India
- State: Madhya Pradesh
- District: Sagar

Population (2011)
  - Total: 30,329

Languages
  - Official: Hindi
- Time zone: UTC+5:30 (IST)
- Postal code: 470227
- Area code: 07585
- ISO 3166 code: IN-MP
- Vehicle registration: MP 15

Rehli is a city and a municipality in Sagar district in the Indian state of Madhya Pradesh. it's also a tehsil headquarter.

== Geography ==
Rehli is located at 23.63°N 79.08°E. It has an average elevation of 390 meters (1,279 feet).

== Demographics ==
As of 2001 India census, Rehli had a population of 25,913. Males constitute 53% of the population and females 47%. Rehli has an average literacy rate of 75%, higher than the national average of 59.5%: male literacy is 73%, and female literacy is 57%. In Rehli, 16% of the population is under 6 years of age.

== Transportation ==
Rehli is situated on MP SH 15A, and is well connected by roads to sagar and jabalpur . Daily bus services are available from the town.

== Place of interest ==
1. Rangir Devi temple

2. Tikitoriya temple

3. Azad fort

4. Sun temple (1100 years old)

5. Atal Setu On Sunar River

6. Sunar River

7. Nauradehi Wildlife Sanctuary

8. Smart Online Work Rehli

9. SICT COMPUTER REHLI

== Nature ==
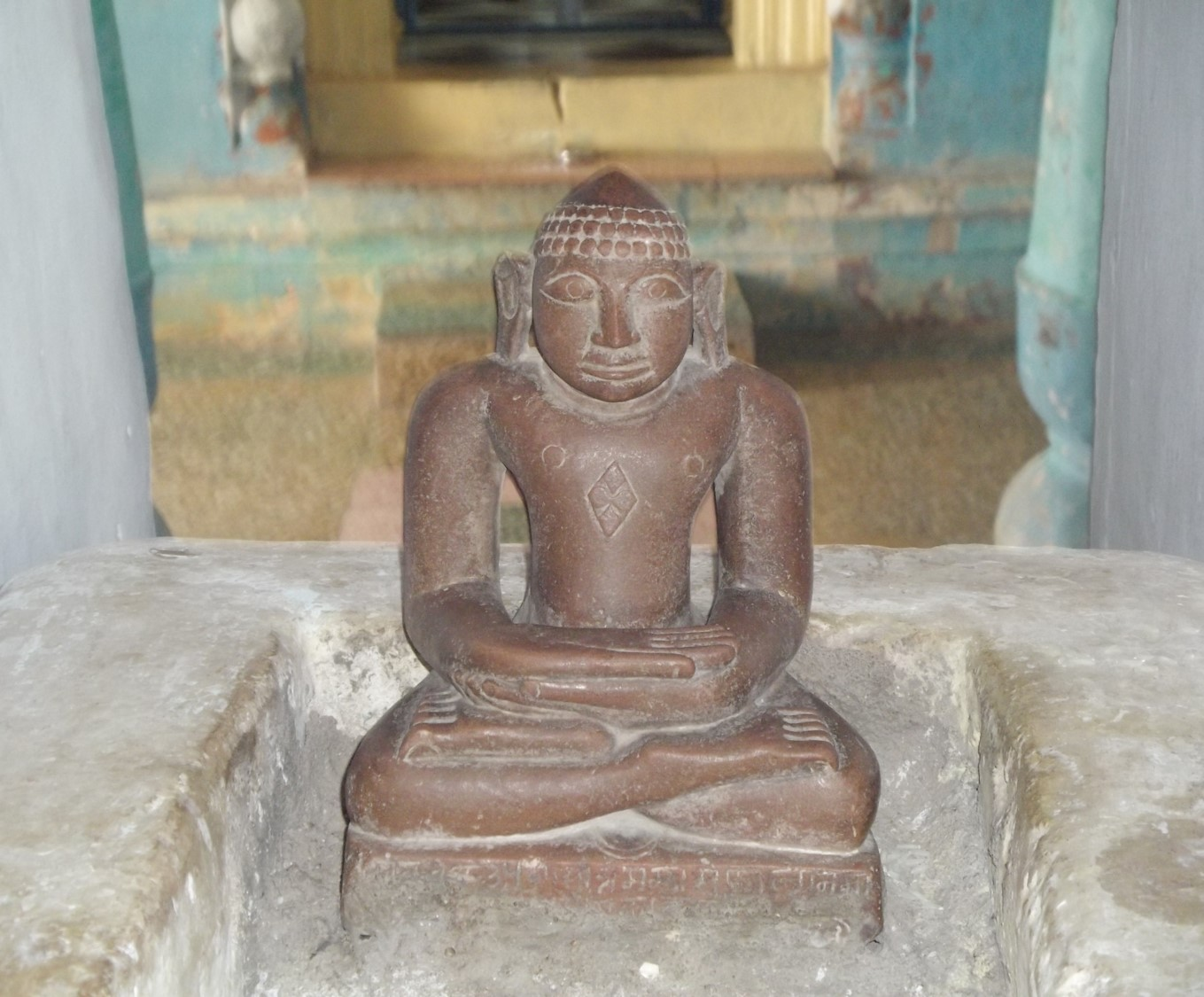
Patanganj jain Mandir

Atishay kshetra Patnaganj ji, Shri Dev Pandrinath Temple located in pandalpur Maratha Kalin temple, Shri Sonbhadra river (which is called Sunar river by local people), dakshin Mukhi kile wale Dada Hanuman temple, bhuteshwar dham world famous and most important citizen of Rehli Nauradehi protected forest and sanctuary is about 25 km away from Rehli. The Nauradehi Wildlife Sanctuary was established in 1975. It is covering about 1,197 km^{2} (462 sq mi).

== Temples ==
- Atishay kshetra Patnaganj ji
- Pandharinath Vitthal Temple, Rehli
- Janki Raman Temple, Rehli
- Sun Temple Rehli
- Tikitoriya Mata Temple, Rehli
- Harsiddhi Mata Temple, Rehli
- Bade Mandir, Rehli
- Ganesh Mandir, Rehli
- Khaki baba mandir, Rehli
- Jain mandir, Rehli
- Devaliya temple, Rehli
- Old Jain Temple, Rehli
- Rameshwar Shiv Temple, Rehli
- Jhadi lord Hanuman temple Rehli

== Private schools ==
School name	Medium
Vimla Devi Public LODA SCHOOL	English
Saraswati Shishu Mandir	Hindi
Bal Gyan Uday	Hindi
Gurukul Academy	English
pratishtha Academy	English
GD Academy	English
shivaji skiksha Niketan	Hindi
Christ Convent School	English
Cambridge convent School	English
DN Memorial	English

== See also ==
- Garhakota
- Sunar River
- Rehli Assembly constituency
