= Jayant Kumar Malaiya =

Indian politician (born 1947)

- damoh
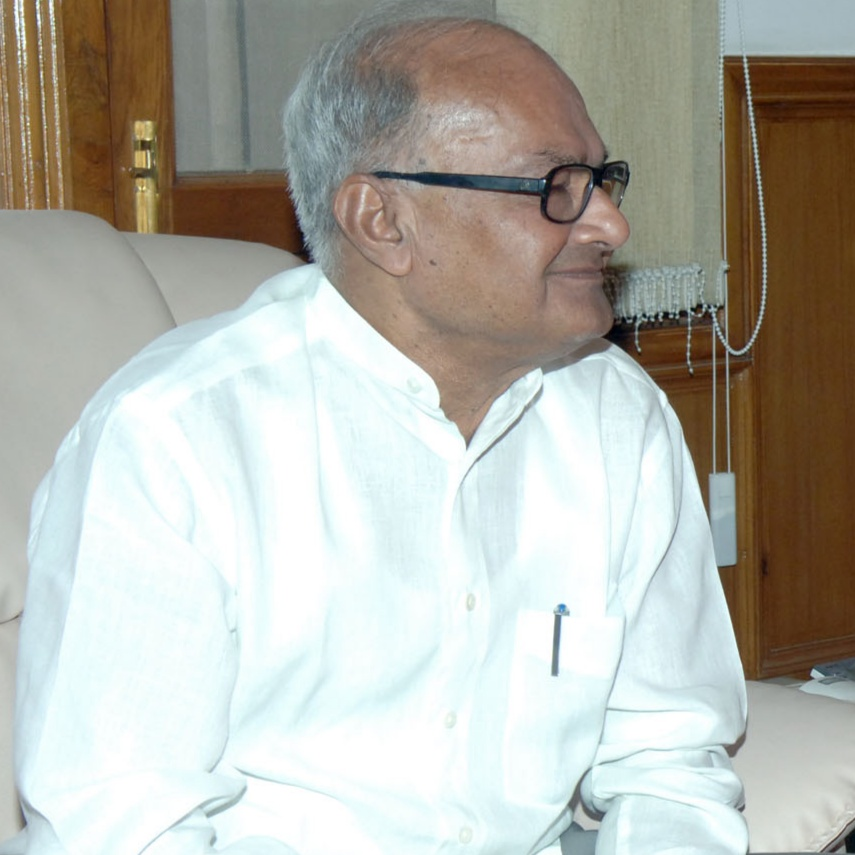
- Jayant Malaiya in 2015.

Minister of Finance & Commercial Taxes, Madhya Pradesh Government
- In office December 2013 – December 2018
- Succeeded by: Brajendra Singh Rathore; Tarun Bhanot

Member of Legislative Assembly from Madhya Pradesh
- In office 1990–2018
- Succeeded by: Rahul Singh
- Constituency: Damoh

Personal details
- Born: 20 February 1947 (age 79) Sagar, Central Provinces and Berar, British India
- Party: Bharatiya Janata Party
- Spouse: Sudha Malaiya
- Children: 2
- Education: LLB
- Profession: Politician
- Source

Jayant Kumar Malaiya (born 20 February 1947) is an Indian politician and a member of the Bharatiya Janata Party. He was a member of Madhya Pradesh Legislative Assembly from Damoh constituency since 1990, but lost in 2018 Madhya Pradesh Assembly election and got reelected again in 2023 Madhya Pradesh Legislative Assembly election.

== Political career ==
Malaiya was elected from Damoh Legislative Assembly for the first time in the sub-election for the seventh assembly in 1984. He was re-elected to the ninth, tenth, eleventh and twelfth Assemblies in 1990, 1993, 1998 and 2003 respectively. Malaiya was elected for the sixth time from the same constituency in the 2008 election. He was elected as a member of Damoh for the fourteenth Assembly in 2013 and 2023 for the sixteenth Assembly.

== Service to MP as a Minister ==
Malaiya was Minister of State for Housing and Environment (Independent Charge) during the Ninth Legislative Assembly. He was a special invitee to the Bharatiya Janata Party (BJP) District Damoh twice, the President of the State BJP Work Committee. He chaired the Loklokha Committee in Eleventh Legislative Assembly of the state. Malaiya joined the Cabinet of then Chief Minister Uma Bharti on 28 June 2004 and was the Minister of Urban Administration and Development. He was sworn in as a minister in the Cabinet of Chief Minister Babulal Gaur on 27 August 2004. Malaiya was re-elected as a minister in the Cabinet of then Chief Minister Shivraj Singh Chauhan on 4 December 2005.

Jayant Malaiya served as the Minister in the Cabinet of Chief Minister Shivraj Singh Chauhan on 20 December 2008. He took oath as Cabinet minister on 21 December 2013. He served as the Finance Minister until Dec 2018.

== See also ==
- Shivraj Singh Chouhan Third ministry (2013–)
