= Tarvar Lodhi =

Indian politician

Tarwar Singh Lodhi

Member of Madhya Pradesh Legislative Assembly
- In office 2018–2023
- Preceded by: Harvansh Singh Rathore
- Succeeded by: Veerendra Singh Lodhi
- Constituency: Banda

Personal details
- Party: Indian National Congress
- Education: Graduate (BA)
- Alma mater: Dr. Hari Singh Gour University
- Profession: Agriculturist

Tarwar Singh Lodhi is an Indian National Congress politician and was a member of the Madhya Pradesh Legislative Assembly between 2018 and 2023. He was elected from Banda and won against the BJP candidate with a margin of over 25,000 votes. Before he was an MLA, he was a zila panchayat member. He was defeated by 406426 votes in the 2024 general election.

== See also ==
- Rahul Lodhi
