= Laxminarayan Nayak =

Indian politician (1918–2019)

Member of Parliament, Lok Sabha
- In office 1977–1980
- Preceded by: Ram Sahai Tiwary
- Succeeded by: Vidyawati Chaturvedi
- Constituency: Khajuraho

Madhya Pradesh Legislative Assembly
- In office 1957–1962
- Preceded by: Lala Ram Bajpai
- Succeeded by: Nathu Ram Niwari
- Constituency: Niwari
- In office 1972–1977
- Preceded by: L. Ran
- Succeeded by: Gauri Shankar Shukla
- Constituency: Niwari

Personal details
- Born: 1918
- Died: 30 November 2019 (aged 101)

Laxminarayan Nayak (1918 – 30 November 2019) was an Indian politician from Madhya Pradesh. He was a member of the Lok Sabha and Madhya Pradesh Legislative Assembly.

== Biography ==
Nayak was born in 1918 at Nimchauni in Tikmagarh. He was a freedom fighter. During the Indian freedom struggle, he was imprisoned several times.

Nayak was elected as a member of Madhya Pradesh Legislative Assembly from Niwari in 1957 as a Praja Socialist Party candidate. He was elected again from this constituency in 1972 as a Samyukta Socialist Party candidate. He was elected as a member of Lok Sabha from Khajuraho in 1977 as a Janata Party candidate.

Nayak died on 30 November 2019 in Niwari at the age of 101.
