= Teharka =

- Village
- Nickname: Kundalpur
- Location in Madhya Pradesh, India
- Coordinates: 25°4′25″N 78°52′11″E
- Country: India
- State: Madhya Pradesh
- District: Niwari
- Tehsil: Niwari

Government
  - Type: Gram Panchayat
  - Body: Sarpanch & Panch
  - Sarpanch: Geeta Ahirwar or Harikrishan Chaurasia

Population (2011)
  - Total: 6,925

Languages
  - Official: Hindi, Bundeli
- Time zone: UTC+5:30 (IST)
- Postal code: 472447
- Vehicle registration: MP36

Teharka is a village in Niwari Tehsil in the Tikamgarh district of the Indian state of Madhya Pradesh. Teharka belongs to the Sagar Division. Teharka is the only village with two gram panchayats (Teharka and Baripura) in Niwari Tehsil. It is located 78 km north of the district headquarters, Tikamgarh, and 320 km from the state capital, Bhopal. Teharka has borders with Prithvipur Tehsil in the south, Mauranipur Tehsil in the east, and Chirgaon Tehsil in the north.

== Demographics ==
As of the 2011 Census of India, Teharka had a population of 6,925. There were 3,584 males and 3,341 females. There were 964 children under the age of 6. The literacy rate is 60%.

=== Schools and Education ===
- Government Boys Higher Secondary School
- Government Girls Higher Secondary School
- Adarsh Ram Raja High School
- ShreeRam Competition Classes
- Abhishek Coaching Center

== Transportation ==
Teharka has a railway station in the North Central Railway zone. It is within 40 km of railway stations at Jhansi and between Magarpur and Ranipur . The nearest airport is at Khajuraho. This village is nearby the national highway NH 76 (Jhansi-Khajuraho).
