= Niwari Assembly constituency =

Constituency of the Madhya Pradesh legislative assembly in India

Coordinates: 25.36°N 78.80°E

Niwari
- Constituency No. 46 for the Madhya Pradesh Legislative Assembly

Constituency details
- Country: India
- Region: Central India
- State: Madhya Pradesh
- District: Niwari
- Lok Sabha constituency: Tikamgarh
- Established: 1951
- Reservation: None

Member of Legislative Assembly
- 16th Madhya Pradesh Legislative Assembly
- Incumbent Anil Jain
- Party: Bharatiya Janata Party
- Elected year: 2023
- Preceded by: Meera Deepak Yadav

Niwari Assembly constituency is one of the 230 Vidhan Sabha (Legislative Assembly) constituencies of Madhya Pradesh state in central India. This constituency came into existence in 1951, as one of the 48 Vidhan Sabha constituencies of the erstwhile Vindhya Pradesh state.

== Overview ==
Niwari (constituency number 46) is a newly formed 52nd district in Madhya Pradesh state which is made from partitioning Tikamgarh district. This constituency covers the entire Niwari tehsil and part of Prithvipur tehsil of the district.

== Members of Legislative Assembly ==
=== Vindhya Pradesh Legislative Assembly ===
Year	Member	Party
1952	Lala Ram Bajpai	Indian National Congress

=== Madhya Pradesh Legislative Assembly ===
Year	Member	Party
1957	Laxminarayan Nayak	Praja Socialist Party
1962	Nathu Ram Niwari	Praja Socialist Party
1967	Lala Ram Bajpai	Indian National Congress
1972	Laxminarayan Nayak	Samyukta Socialist Party
1977	Gauri Shankar Shukla	Janata Party
1980	Ram Ratan Chaturvedi	Indian National Congress (Indira)
1985	Ram Ratan Chaturvedi	Indian National Congress
1990	Vikram Singh Ahir	Janata Dal
1993	Brijendra Singh Rathore	Independent politician
1998	Brijendra Singh Rathore	Independent politician
2003	Brijendra Singh Rathore	Indian National Congress
2008	Meera Deepak Yadav	Samajwadi Party
2013	Anil Jain	Bharatiya Janata Party
2018	Anil Jain	Bharatiya Janata Party
2023	Anil Jain	Bharatiya Janata Party

== Election results ==
=== 2023 ===
2023 Madhya Pradesh Legislative Assembly election: Niwari
Party	Candidate	Votes	%	±%
BJP	Anil Jain	54,186	33.43	−3.28
INC	Amit Rai Jijoura	37,029	22.84	+13.82
SP	Meera Deepak Yadav	32,670	20.15	−10.04
Independent	Nandram Kushwaha	18,827	11.61	
BSP	Awadhesh Pratap Singh Rathore	13,325	8.22	−7.61
NOTA	None of the above	1,166	0.72	+0.38
Majority		17,157	10.59	+4.07
Turnout		162,106	81.67	+6.0
BJP hold		Swing		

=== 2018 ===
2018 Madhya Pradesh Legislative Assembly election: Niwari
Party	Candidate	Votes	%	±%
BJP	Anil Jain	49,738	36.71	
SP	Meera Deepak Yadav	40,901	30.19	
BSP	Ganesh Prasad Kushwaha	21,444	15.83	
INC	Surendra Singh Ahir	12,221	9.02	
Independent	Ramesh Nirala	2,764	2.04	
Independent	Ramprasad	1,389	1.03	
NOTA	None of the above	456	0.34	
Majority		8,837	6.52	
Turnout		135,474	75.67	
BJP hold		Swing		

== See also ==
- Niwari
