= Jeron =

Jeron is a given name. Notable people with the name include:

- Jeron Al-Hazaimeh (born 1992), German professional footballer
- Cassian Jeron Andor, a fictional character in the Star Wars franchise
- Jeron Harvey (born 1984), arena football wide receiver
- Jeron Johnson (born 1988), American footballer and coach
- Jeron Mastrud (born 1987), American footballer
- Jeron Roberts (born 1976), American-Israeli professional basketball player
- Jeron Robinson (born 1991), American track and field high jumper
- Jeron Slusher (born 1944), Guatemalan footballer
- Jeron Teng (born 1994), Filipino professional basketball player
- Jeron Wilson (born 1977), American regular-footed professional skateboarder

== See also ==
- Jeron Khalsa, town and a gram panchayat in Niwari district, Madhya Pradesh, India
