= Laundi Assembly constituency =

Constituency of the Madhya Pradesh legislative assembly

Coordinates: 25.14°N 80.01°E

Laundi
- Former constituency No. 40 for the Madhya Pradesh Legislative Assembly

Constituency details
- Country: India
- Region: Central India
- State: Madhya Pradesh
- District: Chhatarpur
- Lok Sabha constituency: Khajuraho
- Established: 1957
- Abolished: 1977
- Total electors: 86,242 (1972)
- Reservation: None

Laundi was a constituency of the Madhya Pradesh Legislative Assembly in Madhya Pradesh state in central India. It was in existence from 1957 to 1977 after which it was subsumed by Chandla and Maharajpur constituencies. It was one of the 6 Vidhan Sabha constituencies located in Chhatarpur district. It consisted of the entire Laundi tehsil of the district.

== Members of the Legislative Assembly ==
Year	Member	Party
1957	Vidyawati Chaturvedi	Indian National Congress
1962	Raghunath Singh	Praja Socialist Party
1967	S. Kumari	Independent
1972	Baboo Ram Chaturvedi	Indian National Congress

== Election results ==
=== 1972 ===
1972 Madhya Pradesh Legislative Assembly election: Laundi
Party	Candidate	Votes	%	±%
INC	Baboo Ram Chaturvedi			
NOTA	None of the Above			
Majority				
Turnout				
INC gain from		Swing		

== See also ==
- Lavkushnagar
