= Khajuraho Lok Sabha constituency =

Lok Sabha constituency in Madhya Pradesh

Coordinates: 24.75°N 80.16°E

Khajuraho
- Lok Sabha constituency
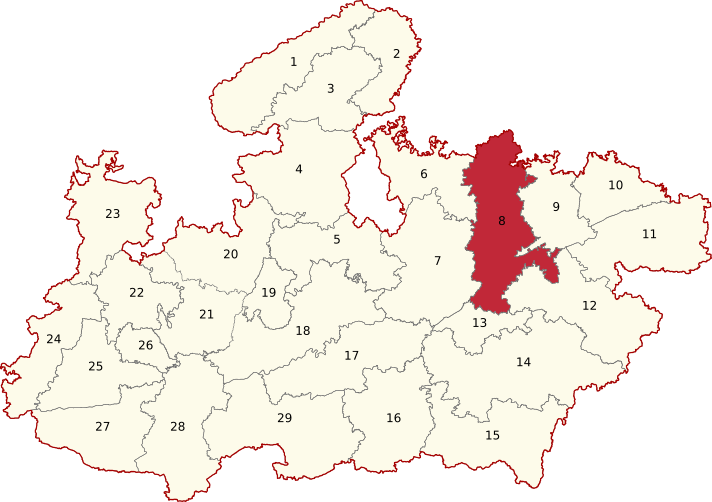
- Khajuraho Lok Sabha constituency within Madhya Pradesh

Constituency details
- Country: India
- Region: Central India
- State: Madhya Pradesh
- Assembly constituencies: Chandla; Rajnagar; Pawai; Gunnaor; Panna; Vijayraghavgarh; Murwara; Bahoriband
- Established: 1957
- Total electors: 19,97,483
- Reservation: None

Member of Parliament
- 18th Lok Sabha
- Incumbent Vishnu Datt Sharma
- Party: Bharatiya Janata Party
- Elected year: 2024

Khajuraho is a Lok Sabha constituency in Madhya Pradesh state in central India. Presently it covers the entire Panna district and parts of Chhatarpur and Katni districts.

== Vidhan Sabha segments ==
Since the delimitation of the parliamentary constituencies in 2008, this constituency comprises the following eight Vidhan Sabha segments:

#	Name	District	Member	Party	2024 Lead
49	Chandla (SC)	Chhatarpur	Dileep Ahirwar	BJP	BJP
50	Rajnagar	Chhatarpur	Arvind Pateriya	BJP	BJP
58	Pawai	Panna	Prahlad Lodhi	BJP	BJP
59	Gunnaor (SC)	Panna	Rajesh Kumar Verma	BJP	BJP
60	Panna	Panna	Brijendra Pratap Singh	BJP	BJP
92	Vijayraghavgarh	Katni	Sanjay Pathak	BJP	BJP
93	Murwara	Katni	Sandeep Jaiswal	BJP	BJP
94	Bahoriband	Katni	Pranay Prabhat Pandey	BJP	BJP

From 1976 to 2008, Khajuraho Lok Sabha constituency comprised the following eight Vidhan Sabha (Legislative Assembly) segments:

#	Name	District
43	Niwari	Niwari
44	Jatara	Tikamgarh
45	Khragapur (SC)	Tikamgarh
46	Tikamgarh	Tikamgarh
48	Bijawar	Chhatarpur
49	Chhatarpur	Chhatarpur
50	Maharajpur (SC)	Chhatarpur
51	Chandla	Chhatarpur

== Members of Lok Sabha ==
Year	Member	Party
1957	Ram Sahai Tiwary	Indian National Congress (Note: Two-member seat)
1957	Moti Lal Malaviya	Indian National Congress
1962	Ram Sahai Tiwary	Indian National Congress
1967-1977 : Constituency defunct
1977	Laxminarayan Nayak	Janata Party
1980	Vidyawati Chaturvedi	Indian National Congress (I)
1984	Vidyawati Chaturvedi	Indian National Congress
1989	Uma Bharti	Bharatiya Janata Party
1991	Uma Bharti	Bharatiya Janata Party
1996	Uma Bharti	Bharatiya Janata Party
1998	Uma Bharti	Bharatiya Janata Party
1999	Satyavrat Chaturvedi	Indian National Congress
2004	Ramkrishna Kusmaria	Bharatiya Janata Party
2009	Jeetendra Singh Bundela	Bharatiya Janata Party
2014	Nagendra Singh	Bharatiya Janata Party
2019	V. D. Sharma	Bharatiya Janata Party
2024	V. D. Sharma	Bharatiya Janata Party

== Election results ==
=== Lok Sabha 2024 ===
2024 Indian general election: Khajuraho
Party	Candidate	Votes	%	±%
BJP	Vishnu Datt Sharma	772,774	67.75	+3.26
BSP	Kamlesh Kumar	2,31,545	20.30	N/A
AIFB	R. B. Prajapati	50,011	4.40	N/A
NOTA	None of the Above	16,157	1.42	+0.43
Majority		5,41,229	47.45	+8.30
Turnout		11,37,867 (Note: does not include postal ballots)	56.97	−11.34
BJP hold		Swing		

=== Lok Sabha 2019 ===
2019 Indian general elections: Khajuraho
Party	Candidate	Votes	%	±%
BJP	Vishnu Datt Sharma	811,135	64.49	+10.18
INC	Kavita Singh	3,18,753	25.34	−0.67
SP	Veer Singh Patel	40,077	3.19	−1.39
IND	Meena /Lalit Raikwar	12,450	0.99	N/A
Majority		4,92,382	39.15	+10.85
Turnout		12,58,316	68.31	+16.95
BJP hold		Swing		

=== Lok Sabha 2014 ===
2014 Indian general elections: Khajuraho
Party	Candidate	Votes	%	±%
BJP	Nagendra Singh	4,74,966	54.31	+14.98
INC	Raja Pateria	2,27,476	26.01	−8.46
BSP	Ram Lakhan Singh	60,368	6.90	−6.32
SP	Siddharth Sukhlal Kushwaha	40,069	4.58	+1.14
Majority		2,47,490	28.30	+23.44
Turnout		8,74,531	51.36	+8.14
BJP hold		Swing		

=== Lok Sabha 2009 ===
2009 Indian general elections: Khajuraho
Party	Candidate	Votes	%	±%
BJP	Jeetendra Singh Bundela	2,29,369	39.33	N/A
INC	Raja Paterya	2,01,037	34.47	N/A
BSP	Sewa Lal Patel	77,107	13.22	N/A
SP	Jayawant Singh	20,045	3.44	N/A
Majority		28,332	4.86	N/A
Turnout		5,83,083	43.21	N/A
BJP hold		Swing		

=== Lok Sabha 1957 ===
- Seat One.
- Motilal Malviya (INC) : 144,834 votes
- Nathoo Ram (BJS) : 73,024
- Seat Two
- Ram Sahai (Congress) : 122,970 votes
- Pyare M (PSP) : 72,962

== See also ==
- Chhatarpur district
- Katni district
- List of constituencies of the Lok Sabha
- Panna district
