= Anil Jain (Madhya Pradesh politician) =

Indian politician (born 1972)

- In office December 2013 – Incumbent
- Preceded by: Meera Deepak Yadav
- Constituency: Niwari

Member of the Legislative Assembly (India)

Personal details
- Born: 1972 (age 53–54) Binwara Niwari, Madhya Pradesh
- Party: Bharatiya Janata Party

Anil Jain (born 1972) is an Indian politician from Madhya Pradesh. He is a three time Member of the Madhya Pradesh Legislative Assembly. He won the Niwari Assembly constituency in the 2023 Madhya Pradesh Legislative Assembly election representing the Bharatiya Janata Party.

== Early life and education ==
Jain is from Niwari, Madhya Pradesh. He is the son of late Babulal Jain.

== Career ==
Jain became an MLA for the first time winning the 2013 Madhya Pradesh Legislative Assembly election from Niwari Assembly constituency representing Bharatiya Janata Party. He polled 60,395 votes and defeated his nearest rival, Meera Deepak Yadav of the Samajwadi Party, by a margin of 27,209 votes. He retained the seat for BJP in the 2018 Madhya Pradesh Legislative Assembly election defeating Deepak Yadav again, but by a lesser margin of 8,837 votes. He won for the third time winning the 2023 Madhya Pradesh Legislative Assembly election defeating Amit Rai Jijoura of the Indian National Congress by a margin of 17,157 votes.
