= Sendari =

- Village
- Location in Madhya Pradesh, India Sendari (India)
- Coordinates: 25.523°N 78.894°E
- Country: India
- State: Madhya Pradesh
- Region: Bundelkhand
- District: Niwari

Government
  - Type: Public
  - Body: Panchayat

Population (2011)
  - Total: 3,041
- Time zone: UTC+5:30 (IST)

Sendari is a village in Niwari district in the Indian state of Madhya Pradesh.
