= Ram Raja Temple =

Hindu temple in Orchha, Madhya Pradesh, India

- राम राजा मंदिर
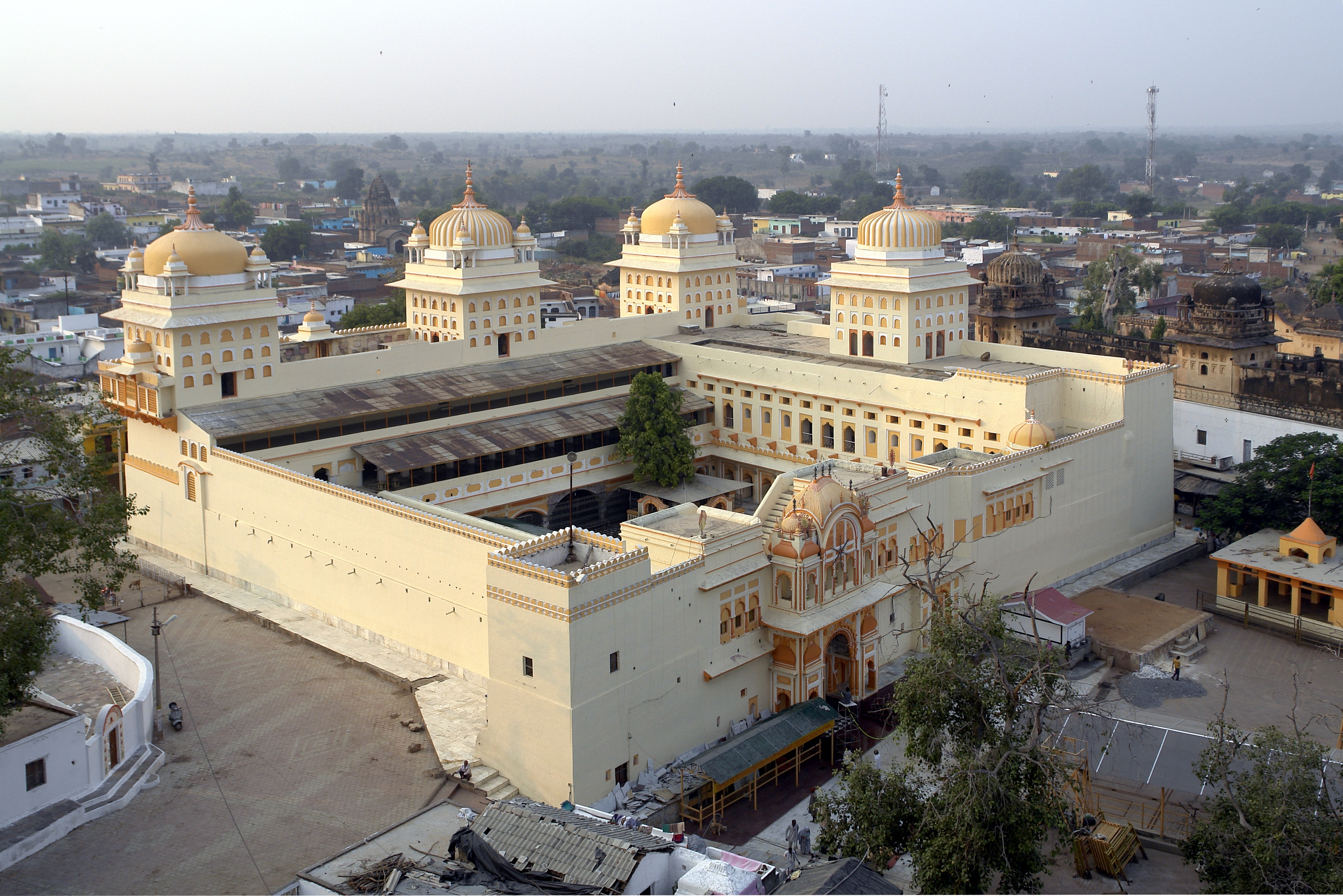
- Ram Raja Temple

- Location in Madhya Pradesh Ram Raja Temple (India)

Religion
- Affiliation: Hinduism
- District: Niwari district
- Deity: Rama
- Festivals: Makar Sankranti, Vasant Panchami, Shivratri, Ram Navami, Kartik Purnima and Vivaha Panchami

Location
- Location: Orchha
- State: Madhya Pradesh
- Country: India
- Coordinates: 25°21′03″N 78°38′21″E

Architecture
- Elevation: 214 m (702 ft)

Website
- ramrajatemple.mp.gov.in

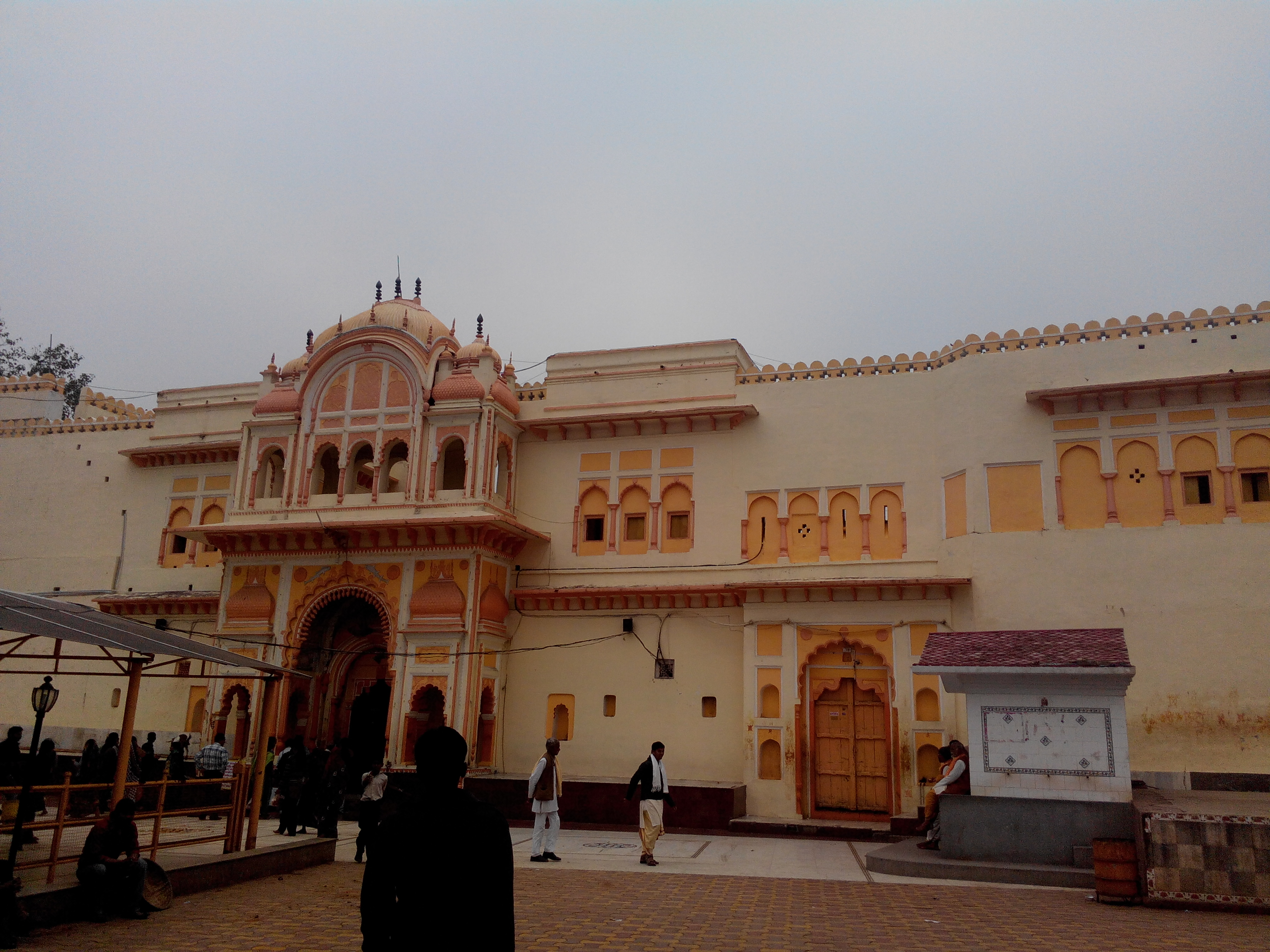
Ram Raja Temple, Orchha

Ram Raja Temple is a Hindu temple in Orchha, Niwari district, Madhya Pradesh, India. In this temple Raja Ram is accompanied by Sita (on the left), brother Lakshmana (on the right), Maharaj Sugriva and Narsingh Bhagwan (on the right). Durga Maa is also present in the darbaar. Hanuman ji and Jambavan ji are shown praying below the main figures. The speciality of this temple is that Lord Rama has a sword in his right hand and a shield in his left hand and a shield in the other. Shri Ram is seated in a Padmasana-like posture, with his left leg crossed over his right thigh.

The daily number of visitors to the temple ranges from 1500 to 3000 and on certain important Hindu festivals like the Makar Sankranti, Vasant Panchami, Shivratri, Ram Navami, Kartik Purnima and Vivaha Panchami the number of devotees who throng to Orchha ranges in thousands.

It is a sacred Hindu pilgrimage and receives devotees in large numbers regularly and is also commonly known as Orchha Temple. The annual domestic tourist number is around 650,000 and the foreign tourist number is around 25,000.

In India this is the only temple where God Rama is worshiped as a king and that too in a palace. A Guard of Honour is held every day, police personnel have been designated as Guards at the temple, much in the manner of a king. The food and other amenities provided to the deity at the temple are a royal repast. Armed salutation is provided to God Ram every day.

== History ==
The story of Ram Raja Temple according to many local people goes like this: The King of Orchha Madhukar Shah Ju Dev (1554–1592) was a devotee of Banke Bhihari (God Krishna) of Brindavan while his wife Queen Ganesh Kunwari, also called Kamla Devi, was a devotee of God Ram. One day the King and the Queen went to God Krishna's temple but the temple had closed by that time. The queen urged the king to go back but the king wanted to stay. So both the king and queen decided to stay back. They joined a group of devotees who were singing and dancing in praise of God Krishna outside the temple. The king and queen also joined in the prayers and started to sing and dance. It is believed that God Krishna and Radha personified and danced with them and golden flowers were showered from the heavens at that moment.

After that incident the king asked the queen to accompany him to Braj-Mathura the land of God Krishna, but the queen wanted to go to Ayodhya. The king got annoyed and told the queen to stop praying child form of God Ram and accompany him to Braj. But the queen was adamant, after which the king said that "You keep praying to Ram but Ram never appears in front of us, unlike God Krishna who danced with us along with Radha the other day. If you are so adamant to go to Ayodhya then go, but return only when you have the child form of Ram with you. Only then will I accept your true devotion." The queen took a vow that she would go to Ayodhya and return with the child form of Ram or else she would drown herself in Ayodhya's Sarayu river. The queen left the palace and started the long journey to Ayodhya on foot to bring God Ram with her to Orchha. She didn't tell the King before leaving that she had ordered her servants to start building a temple (Chaturbhuj Temple) when she brings God Ram with her.

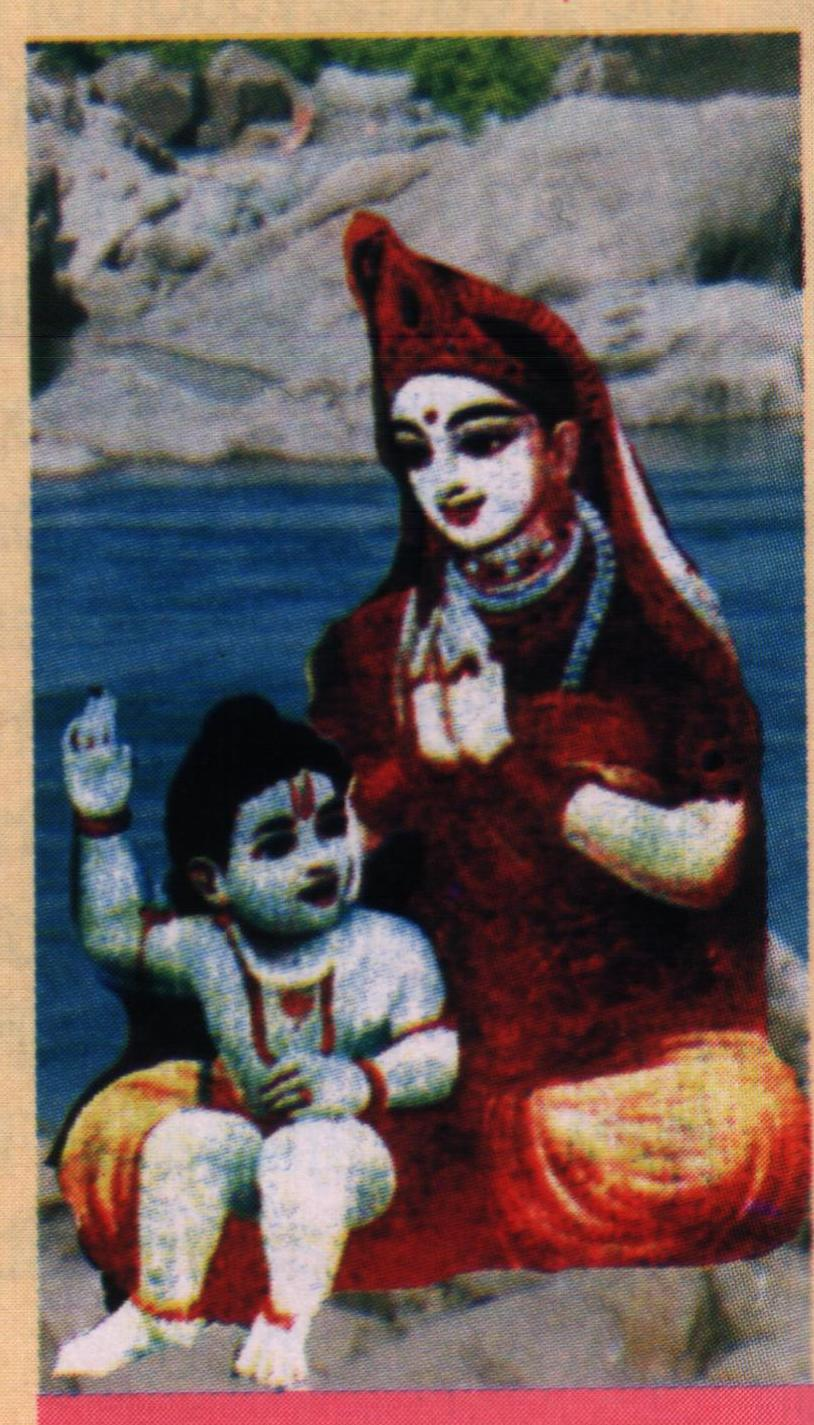
Child Form of Ram Painting Orchha temple

On reaching Ayodhya, the Queen started praying to God Ram close to Laxman Fort near Sarayu river. She ate only fruits, then she gave up fruits and ate only leaves, and eventually she gave up all food. The Queen fasted and prayed for about a month but God Ram did not appear, so eventually in despair, she jumped into the river at midnight. Just then something magical happened and God Ram appeared in child form in the Queen's lap.

God Ram told the queen that he was happy with her prayers and she could ask for a boon, at which the queen asked God Ram to come with her in child form to Orchha. God Ram agreed to go but he put forth three conditions: "I will travel only in Pukh Nakshatra. When Pukh Nakshatra will end I will stop and resume only when Pukh Nakshatra sets in again. In this manner I will travel from Ayodhya to Orchha on foot along with a group of sages. Secondly, once I reach Orchha, I will be the King of Orchha and not your husband. Thirdly, (since the child form of Ram would travel in the queen’s lap), the first place you seat me will be my final place of stay and will be famous by the name of Ramraja." The Queen agreed and started her journey to Orchha with baby Ram in her lap. Since the queen travelled only in Pukh Nakshtra it took 8 months and 27 days for the queen to reach Orchha from Ayodhya on foot (between 1574 and 1575).

King Madhukar Shah meanwhile had a dream where God Banke Bihari scolded him on discriminating between God Ram and himself. God Banke Bihari reminded the King that God Ram and he are one and the same, there is no difference. King was very apologetic when he woke up and found out that the queen was returning from Ayodhya. The King went to receiver the queen with horses, elephants, servants, food, etc. and apologized to the queen. The queen did not accept king's apology and refused the comforts offered to her by the King. The Queen claimed that she now possessed everything one could ever ask for (God Ram in child form). On returning to Orchha, the queen went back to her palace with baby Ram and retired in her room for the night, only to take God Ram to the Chaturbhuj Temple the next day. But according to God Ram's conditions he took the first place where he was seated, hence God Ram transformed into an idol and got transfixed in the queen's palace itself. To this day the Ram Raja Temple is in the queen's palace (Ranivaas or Rani Mahal) and not in the Chaturbhuj Temple which is right next to the palace. Originally, God Ram was standing position and the queen was serving Him 3–4 hours every day in standing position and used to get tired. God Rama requested to serve Him sitting only but queen replied that if He is standing then how can she sit. The deity God Rama sat down on hearing this from queen (source Bhaktmal by Nabhadasji Maharaj). Additionally, as promised by the queen, God Ram is the King (Raja) of Orchha, hence the name Ram Raja Temple.

== Darshan of Shree Ram’s left foot’s toe ==
Shree Ram is sitting in Padmasan (Lotus position), with only left leg crossed over the right thigh though (both legs are not crossed unlike in the usual Padmasan). Every day after worship sandalwood's teeka is applied on God Ram's left toe. It is believed when visiting the Raja Ram Darbaar if worshippers look at the left foot's big toe then their wish gets fulfilled. Spotting the left foot's big toe on God Ram's idol is not easy, one should not look down since the left leg is folded, instead one should look close to God Ram's right hand. The temple priest can also help in spotting the toe.

== Darshan & Temple Routine ==
The temple routine/ timings are based on the Hindu Calendar Months as follows:

Hindu Calendar	Phagun% to Kwar/Kartik^	Kartik^ to Magh/Phagun%
Calendar Months	February to October	October to February
Aarti	8:00 am	9:00 am
Rajbhog Chik (15min)	12:00 pm	12:30 pm
Aarti Rajbhog	12:30 pm	1:00 pm
Shyam Aarti	8:00 pm	7:00 pm
Biyari Ki Chik (15min)	10:00 pm	9:00 pm
Biyari Ki Aarti	10:30 pm	9:30 pm

=== Darshan Timings ===
- Morning - Aarti to Aarti Rajbhog + 5 min or till last person visiting temple
- Evening - Shyam Aarti to Biyari Ki Aarti + 5 min.

Note: Aarti is roughly 20 min. long.

=== Note ===
% Phagun Month - Starts approx. 15 days prior to Holi

^ Kartik Month - Starts approx. 15 days prior to Diwali

== Bhog for Devotees & Other Arrangements ==
The Temple has following arrangements for devotees:

Description	Time	Price (INR.)	Advance Booking Required
Mahaprasad (Ladoo Packed)		20,50,100	
Raj Bhog (Packed Lunch)	After 20min of Aarti Rajbhog	700	At least 1 day
Bal Bhog (Khichadi distribution to children outside temple)	After Morning Aarti	2500	At least 10–15 days
Vyari Bhog (Dinner distribution outside temple)	After Shyam Aarti	5500	At least 10–15 days
Poshak (Offering of New Clothes to God)	Before Morning Aarti	5100	At least 10–15 days

== Important Events at the temple ==
1. Rama Navami: This festival is celebrated Shukla Paksha on the Navami, the ninth day of the month of Chaitra in the Hindu calendar. During this time God Ram's idol is moved from inside the temple (गर्भगृह) to a throne in the verenda. Ramnavami is God Ram's Nativity, Ram's birth exhibit is displayed during this time and people from all over come to witness this event at the temple.
2. Ganga Dussehra
3. Rath Yatra
4. Sawan Teej
5. Rahesya Pooranmashi
6. Vivha Panchami
7. Ganesh Kunwari Jayanti
8. Holika Festival
9. God Ram's Wedding
