= Meera Deepak Yadav =

Indian politician

Member of the Legislative Assembly
- In office 2008–2013
- Preceded by: Brijendra Singh Rathore
- Succeeded by: Anil Jain
- Constituency: Niwari

Personal details
- Born: Chhatarpur Madhya Pradesh
- Party: Samajwadi Party
- Spouse: Deep Narayan Singh Yadav
- Children: Deepankar Singh Yadav

Meera Deepak Yadav is a former Member of the Legislative Assembly of Niwari, India. She represented the Niwari constituency of Madhya Pradesh and she is a member of the Samajwadi Party political party.

== See also ==
- Anil Jain
