= Jeetendra Singh Bundela =

Indian politician (died 2019)

Jeetendra Singh Bundela (died February 3, 2019) was an Indian politician. He was member of 15th Lok Sabha from Khajuraho seat. He was Member of the Legislative Assembly of Madhya Pradesh, representing the Bijawar seat in Chhatarpur district. He belonged to Bhartiya Janata Party.

== Early life ==
He started his political career from college days and was elected College President. Thereafter, he became a Panch in his small-time village Bogota. He was nominated by the Party to contest the election to the Madhya Pradesh Legislative Assembly from the Bijawar seat of Madhya Pradesh.

The other adversaries were powerful and erstwhile ruler Shri. Manvendra Singh from the Congress Party and the rich and affluent liquor barons from Samajwadi Party.

In the last round, Bundela lost by a margin of 1500 votes to Congress veteran. Thereafter, BJP elevated him to District President of Chhatarpur, his home district. In the subsequent election to Assembly the party decided again to field him against Congress veteran Manvendra Singh, who was by then elevated as Minister in the present ruling Government.

Bundela had won the election leaving Congress and other party candidate by a margin of approximately 30,000 votes. After his successful tenure as a member of Legislative Assembly he was nominated to contest the Khajuraho Lok Sabha seat which covered full district of Panna and partially Chhatarpur and Katni. Bundela reached Parliament of India.
