= Taricharkalan =

Tarichar kalan
- Town
- Location in Madhya Pradesh, India Tarichar kalan (India)
- Coordinates: 23°58′15″N 78°25′44″E
- Country: India
- State: Madhya Pradesh
- District: Niwari
- Proposed Tehsil: Tarichar kalan
- Best Place: Paleshwar shiv Tempal

Population (2011)
  - Total: 7,222

Languages
  - Official: Hindi
- Time zone: UTC+5:30 (IST)
- Postal Code: 472445
- ISO 3166 code: IN-MP
- Vehicle registration: MP 71

Taricharkalan is a town and a Nagar Panchayat in Niwari district in the Indian state of Madhya Pradesh.

== Demographics ==
As of 2001 India census, Taricharkalan had a population of 7222. Males constitute 54% of the population and females 46%. Taricharkalan has an average literacy rate of 57%, lower than the national average of 59.5%: male literacy is 87%, and female literacy is 65%. In Taricharkalan, 17% of the population is under 6 years of age.
