= Jeron Khalsa =

- Town
- Location in Madhya Pradesh, India Jeron Khalsa (India)
- Coordinates: 25°7′17″N 78°39′7″E
- Country: India
- State: Madhya Pradesh
- District: Niwari

Population (2011)
  - Total: 8,220

Languages
  - Official: Hindi
- Time zone: UTC+5:30 (IST)
- ISO 3166 code: IN-MP
- Vehicle registration: MP

Jeron Khalsa is a town and a gram panchayat in Niwari district in the Indian state of Madhya Pradesh.

== Demographics ==
As of 2001 India census, Jeron Khalsa had a population of 13,000. Total number of households is 1,768. Males constitute 53% of the population and females 47%. Jeron Khalsa has an average literacy rate of 42%, lower than the national average of 59.5%: male literacy is 54%, and female literacy is 29%. In Jeron Khalsa, 18% of the population is under 6 years of age. Jeron khalsa has high brahmin population. It has a famous pond known as Sanera Tal .It is approximately 17 km from Prithvipur and 42 km from Jhansi, Uttar Pradesh.
