= Moti Lal Malaviya =

Indian politician (born 1925)

Member of Parliament, Lok Sabha
- In office 1952–1962
- Constituency: Khajuraho, Madhya Pradesh

Personal details
- Born: 24 February 1925 Ratlam, Madhya Pradesh, British India
- Party: Indian National Congress

Moti Lal Malaviya (born 24 February 1925) was an Indian politician. He was elected to the lower House of Parliament, the Lok Sabha, from Khajuraho, Madhya Pradesh, India.
