= Satyavrat Chaturvedi =

Indian politician

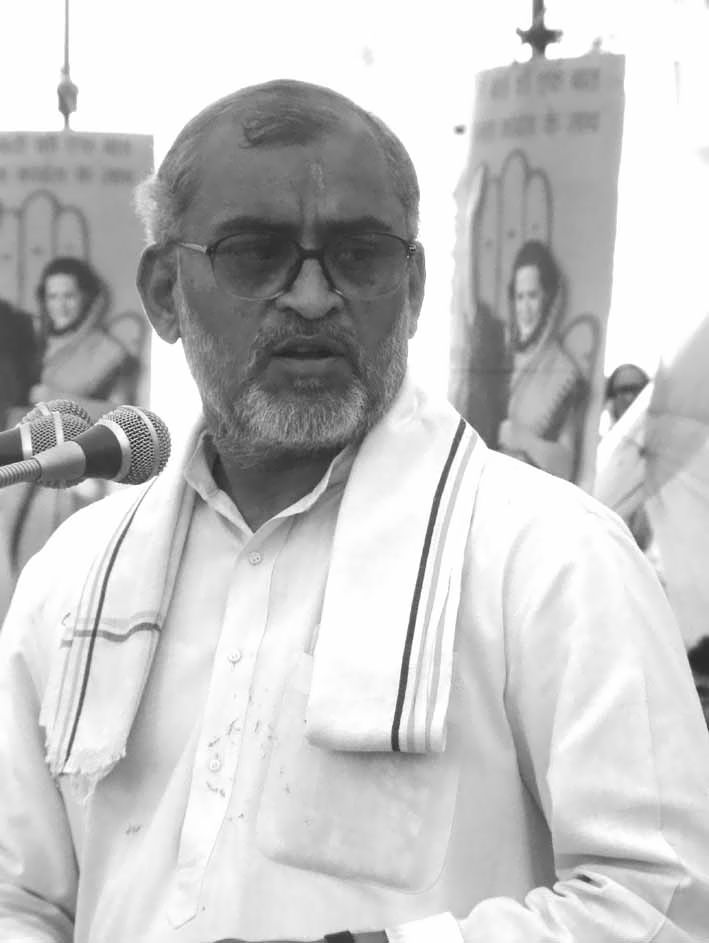

MP of Rajya Sabha for Madhya Pradesh
- In office 3 April 2012 – 2 April 2018
- Succeeded by: Rajmani Patel, INC
- In office 3 April 2006 – 2 April 2012
- Preceded by: Sushma Swaraj
- Succeeded by: Mahendra Singh Mahra, INC

Members of Parliament
- In office 1999–2004
- Preceded by: Uma Bharti
- Succeeded by: Ramkrishna Kusmaria
- Constituency: Khajuraho

Member of the Madhya Pradesh Legislative Assembly
- In office 1980–1984
- Preceded by: Raghunath Singh
- Succeeded by: Shyam Behari Pathak
- Constituency: Chandla
- In office 1993–1998
- Preceded by: Ansari Mohammed Gani
- Succeeded by: Vijay Bahadur Singh Bundela

Personal details
- Born: 13 January 1950 (age 76) Chhatarpur, Madhya Pradesh
- Party: Indian National Congress
- Spouse: Neelam Chaturvedi (m. 1971)
- Children: Nitin Chaturvedi, Neeti Chaturvedi, Nidhi Chaturvedi
- Parent(s): Baburam Chaturvedi (father); Vidyawati Chaturvedi (mother)
- Education: Sainik School Rewa
- Occupation: Politician
- As of 29 June, 2018 Source: ["Biodata". Archive, Govt. of India. Archived from the original on 29 June 2018.]

Satyavrat Chaturvedi (born 13 January 1950) is an Indian politician. He is a former member of the Indian National Congress party.

He was elected to Lok Sabha from Khajuraho in 1999. He was a Member of the Parliament of India, representing Madhya Pradesh and Uttarakhand in the Rajya Sabha, the upper house of the Parliament. He was the chairman of the select committee on the Lokpal bill in Rajya sabha during the UPA II government.

He is alumnus of Sainik School Rewa.

== Early life ==
Chaturvedi was born in Chhatarpur, Madhya Pradesh, to Baburam Chaturvedi and Vidyawati Chaturvedi. His mother had been elected to Lok Sabha from Khajuraho twice.
