= Ram Sahai Tiwary =

Indian politician

Member of Parliament, Lok Sabha
- In office 1952–1967
- Constituency: Khajuraho, Madhya Pradesh

Personal details
- Party: Indian National Congress

Ram Sahai Tiwary was an Indian politician. He was elected to the lower House of Parliament, the Lok Sabha, from Khajuraho, Madhya Pradesh, India. He was a member of the Constituent Assembly of India representing Vindhya Pradesh.
