= Prithvipur =

- Town
- Location in Madhya Pradesh, India Prithvipur (India)
- Coordinates: 25°11′7″N 78°39′54″E
- Country: India
- State: Madhya Pradesh
- Region: Bundelkhand
- District: Niwari

Government
  - Type: Public
  - Body: City Council
  - MLA: Late Brijendra Singh Rathore

Population (11)
  - Total: 42,883
- Time zone: UTC+5:30 (IST)
- PIN: 472338
- Telephone code: 07680
- ISO 3166 code: IN-MP
- Vehicle registration: MP-71
- Website: https://niwari.nic.in

Prithvipur is a town and a nagar parishad in Niwari district in the Indian state of Madhya Pradesh. It is the administrative headquarters of Prithvipur tehsil in the Niwari sub-division of the district.

== Demographics ==
As of 2001 India census, Prithvipur had a population of 32,542. Males constitute 53% of the population and females 47%. Prithvipur has an average literacy rate of 50%, lower than the national average of 59.5%: male literacy is 60%, and female literacy is 39%. In Prithvipur, 18% of the population is under 6 years of age.Prithvipur is bigger than Orchha Tehsil of Niwari District.

== Government ==
Prithvipur Assembly constituency is one of the 230 Vidhan Sabha (Legislative Assembly) constituencies of Madhya Pradesh state in central India. Nitendra Singh Rathore is current MLA from Prithvipur.
