= Vidyawati Chaturvedi =

Indian politician

Member of the Madhya Pradesh Legislative Assembly
- In office 1957–1962
- Succeeded by: Raghunath Singh
- Constituency: Laundi

Member of parliament, 7th Lok Sabha
- In office 1980–1989
- Preceded by: Laxmi Narayan Naik
- Succeeded by: Uma Bharti
- Constituency: Khajuraho

MP of Rajya Sabha for Madhya Pradesh
- In office 1966–1972
- In office 1972–1978

Personal details
- Born: 6 December 1926; Kulpahar, Hamirpur district, Uttar Pradesh
- Died: 11 March 2009 (aged 82); Chhatarpur, Madhya Pradesh
- Political party: INC (Indian National Congress)
- Spouse: Babu Ram Chaturvedi
- Children: Son Satyavrat Chaturvedi; 1 Daughter
- Parent: Nathuramji Rawat (Father)
- Education: Privately Sahitya Ratan
- Occupation: Politician
- As of 29 June, 2018 Source: ["Biodata". Lok Sabha, Govt. of India.]

Vidyawati Chaturvedi (1926–2009) was an Indian politician from the state of the Madhya Pradesh. She represented Laundi Vidhan Sabha constituency of undivided Madhya Pradesh Legislative Assembly by winning General election of 1957. She also represented Khajuraho (Lok Sabha constituency) between 1980 and 1989. Her son Satyavrat Chaturvedi was also elected to Lok Sabha from Khajuraho later.
