= Niwari district =

Coordinates: 25°18′44″N 78°40′3″E

- District of Madhya Pradesh
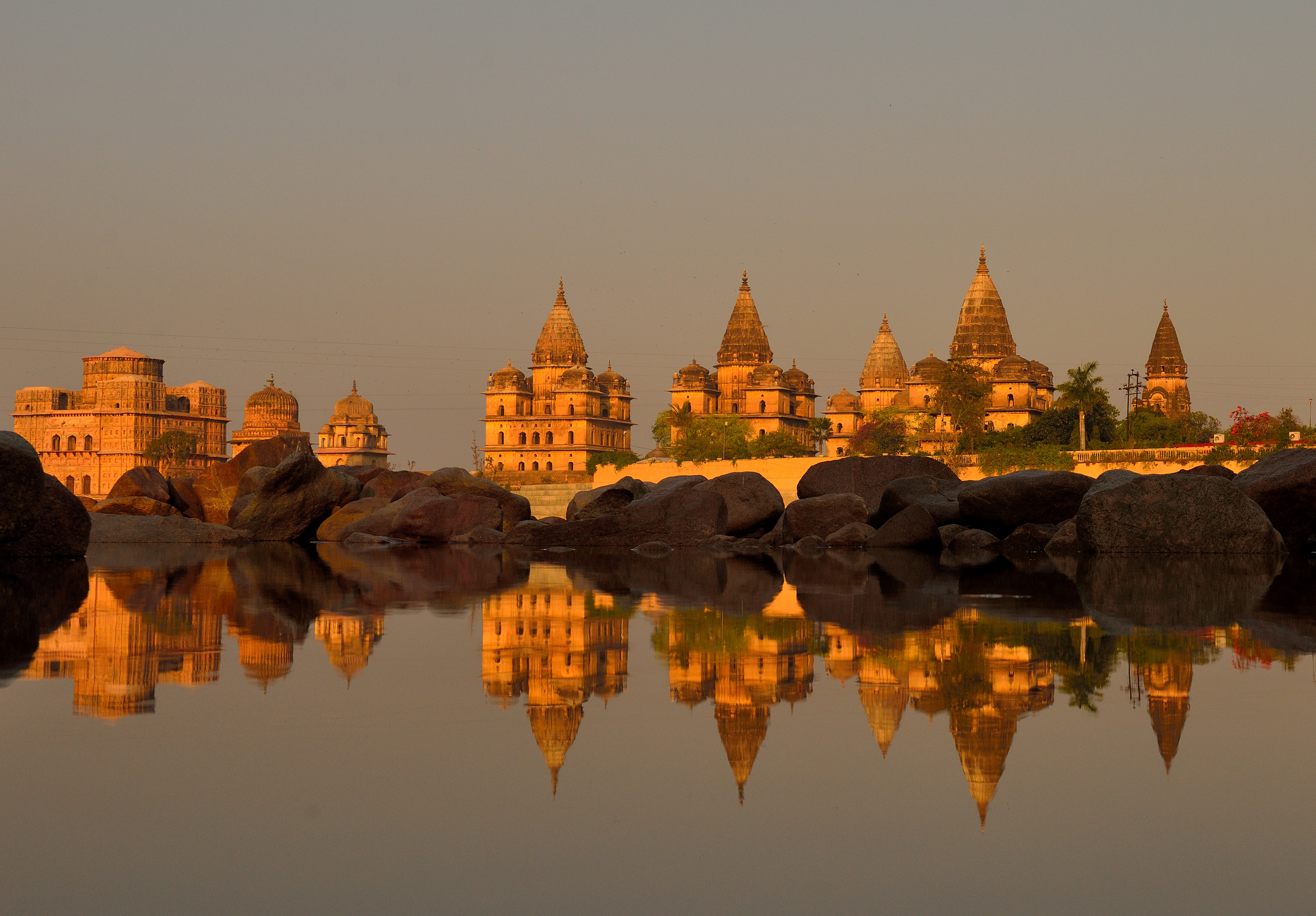
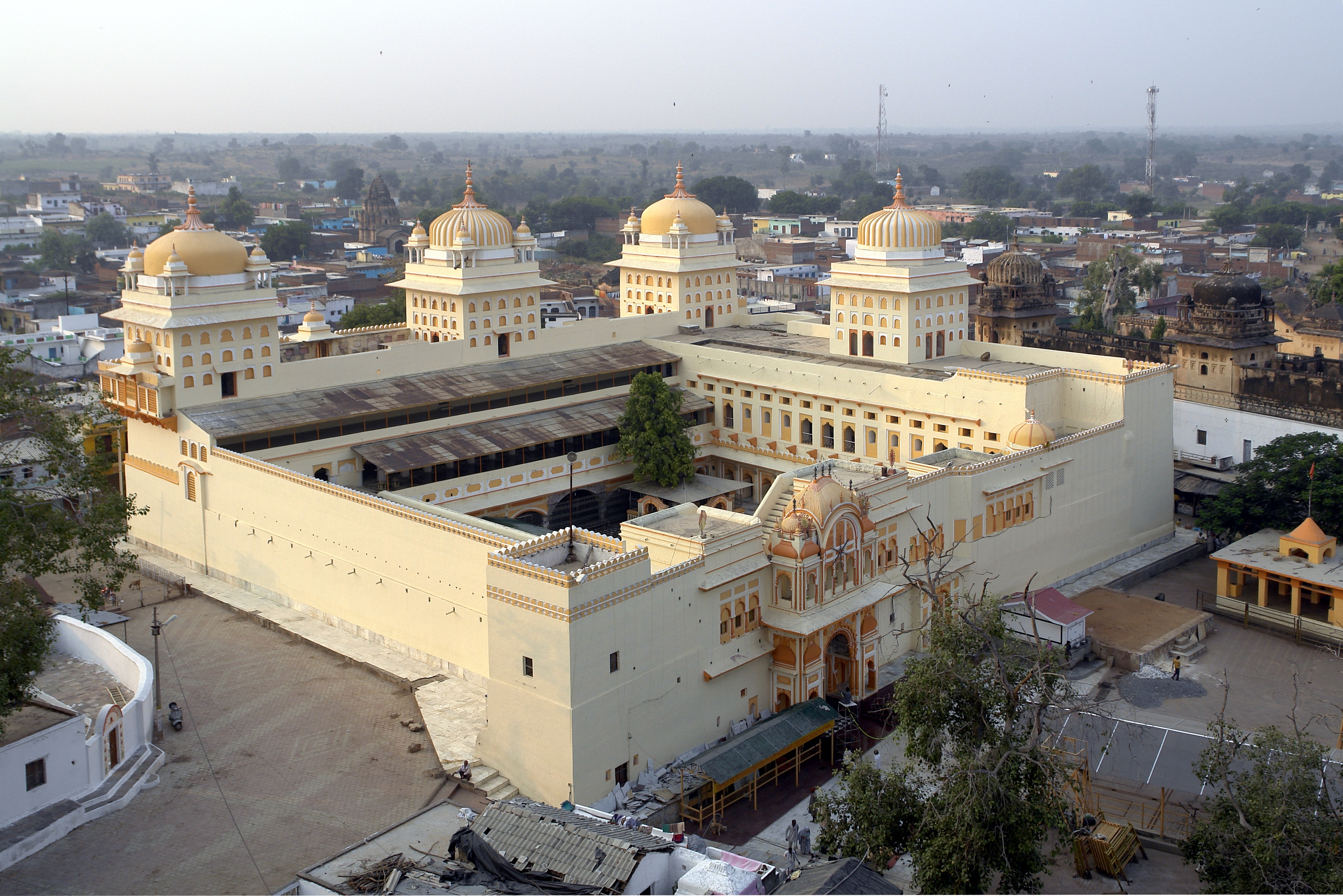
- top :Chhatris on the banks of the Betwa river, Orchha Bottom : Raja Ram Mandir

- Country: India
- State: Madhya Pradesh
- Division: Sagar
- Headquarters: Niwari
- Tehsils: Niwari, Orchha, Prithvipur, Proposed Tehsil Tarichar kalan

Government
  - District Magistrate: Mr. Narendra Kumar Suryavanshi IAS
  - Lok Sabha constituencies: Tikamgarh (Lok Sabha constituency)

Area
  - Total: 1,170 km^{2} (450 sq mi)

Population
  - Total: 404,807
  - Density: 346/km^{2} (896/sq mi)
- Time zone: UTC+05:30 (IST)
- Vehicle registration: MP 71
- Website: niwari.nic.in

Niwari district (Hindi pronunciation: [n̪ɪʋaːɽiː]) is one of the 55 districts of the Madhya Pradesh state in India. Niwari is administrative headquarter of Niwari district.

This district was formed on 1 October 2018. It was formerly part of Tikamgarh district. Niwari is the smallest district of Madhya Pradesh.

Niwari has 3 tehsils: Prithvipur, Niwari and Orchha.

== Description ==
It became the 52nd district of the state. Under this district, 56 Panchayats of Prithvipur Tehsil, 54 Panchayats of Niwari, 17 Panchayats of Orchha were included. Thus a total of 127 gram panchayats have been included here. It is the smallest district of Madhya Pradesh in terms of both population and area.

The Betwa River passes through this district, on the banks of this river Orchha town was established by ancient Kings of Bundelkhand. National Highway 39 and National Highway 44 and National Highway 539 passes through Niwari.

== Demographics ==
At the time of the 2011 census, Niwari district had a population of 404,807, of which 79,218 (19.57%) lived in urban areas. Niwari had a sex ratio of 897 females per 1000 males. Scheduled Castes and Scheduled Tribes make up 99,441 (24.57%) and 18,244 (4.51%) of the population respectively.

Religions in Niwari district (2011)
Religion	Percent
Hinduism	97.93%
Islam	1.55%
Other or not stated	0.52%

Niwari district has 396,427 (97.93%) Hindus and 6,279 (1.55%) Muslims.

Languages of Niwari district (2011)
1. Bundeli (60.2%)
2. Hindi (39.5%)
3. Others (0.26%)

At the time of the 2011 census, 60.23% of the population spoke Bundeli and 39.51% Hindi as their first language.

== Places of interest ==
- Orchha– The ancient town of Orchha seems frozen in time, with its many monuments continuing to retain their original grandeur even to this day. Here you will find some of the most fascinating temples and palaces that will help you realise a childhood fantasy – travelling back in time.

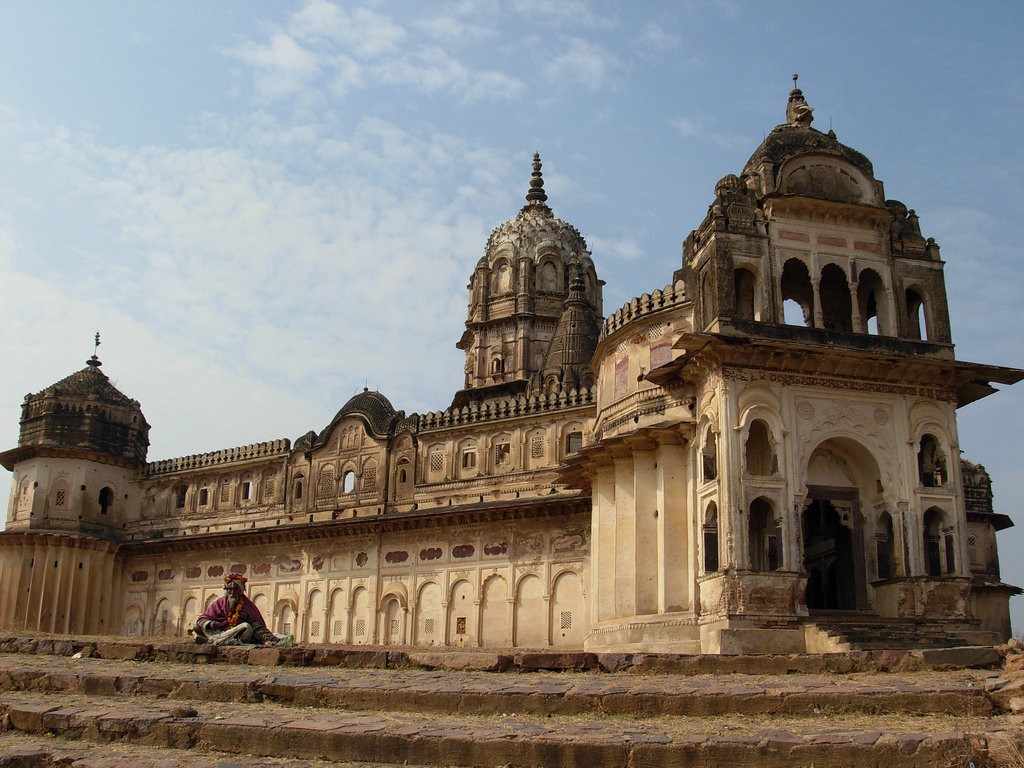

Lakshmi Mandir Orchha

- Shri Ramraja Temple Orchha– It is a sacred Hindu pilgrimage and receives devotees in large numbers regularly and is also commonly known as Orchha Temple. The annual domestic tourist number is around 650,000 and the foreign tourist number is around 25,000.

Raja Ram Mandir Orchha

- Garh Kundar–The Garh Kundar fort is located on a high hill, surrounded by picturesque hills and forests. Besides the main fort, the remains of various ancient structures can be seen here.

== Tourist places ==
- Orchha
- Raja Ram Mandir

== How to reach ==
- By Air

Niwari do not have any airport. The nearest airport is Khajuraho Airport (HJR). It is around 123 KM from Niwari.

- By Rail

Niwari railway station is in the North Central Railway zone. Its Railway code is NEW.

- By Road

Niwari is well connected with the Roads. State Highway and National Highway passes from the city. Buses from other cities comes to the Niwari city.

== See also ==
- Jeron Khalsa
- Tarichar Kalan
