= Niwari, Madhya Pradesh =

Niwari
- Town
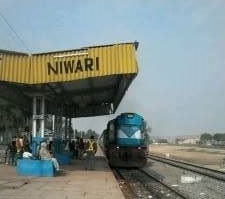
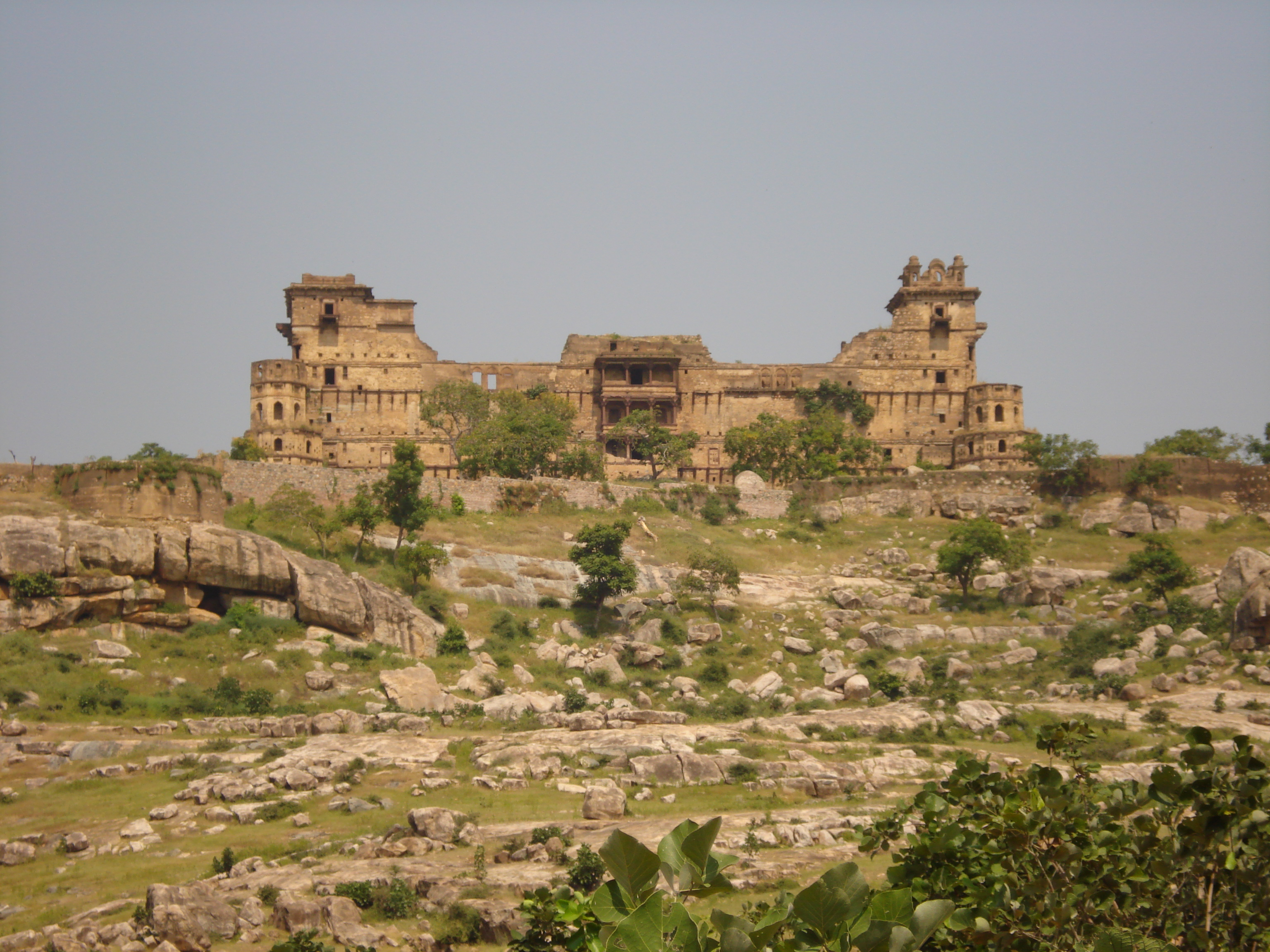
- Top: Niwari Railway Station in Niwari, M.P; Bottom: Garh Kundar Fort

- Location in Madhya Pradesh, India Niwari (India)
- Coordinates: 25°20′58.481″N 78°47′57.821″E
- Country: India
- State: Madhya Pradesh
- District: Niwari

Government
  - Type: Municipal Council
  - Body: Niwari Municipal Council

Population (2001)
  - Total: 20,711

Languages
  - Official: Hindi, Bundeli
- Time zone: UTC+5:30 (IST)
- PIN: 472442
- Telephone code: 91-7680
- ISO 3166 code: IN-MP
- Vehicle registration: MP-36
- Distance from New Delhi: 434 kilometres (270 mi) SE
- Website: niwari.nic.in

Niwari is a town and a nagar panchayat in Niwari district in the Indian state of Madhya Pradesh. It is the administrative headquarters of Niwari district.

== Geography ==
Niwari is located on 25.34°N 78.80°E. Niwari is adjacent to the Jhansi and Mahoba districts of Uttar Pradesh. It is located in Bundelkhand Region of Madhya Pradesh. It belongs to Sagar Division.

== Demographics ==
As of the 2001 Census of India, Niwari had a population of 20,711 with the 606,00 km^{2} area. Males constitute 53% of the population and females 47%. Niwari has an average literacy rate of 60%, higher than the national average of 59.5%: male literacy is 69%, and female literacy is 50%. In Niwari, 7% of the population is under 6 years of age.

== Places of interest ==
- Garh Kundar Fort, 20 km away
- Gajanan Mata Temple Garh Kundar, 20 km away
- Giddhwahini Mata Temple Kundar, 21 km away

== Transportation ==
Niwari Is well connected by roads and railway.

- Niwari is located on Jhansi-Chhatarpur-Rewa, National Highway 39. Niwari is connected by private bus services to all nearest major cities.
- Niwari railway station located on Jhansi-Manikpur-Prayagraj line. Niwari railway station is in the North Central Railway zone with the railway code NEW. It connects Niwari to major cities.
