= Shantinath temple =

Shantinath temple may refer to these Jain temples in India dedicated to Shantinatha:

- Shantinath Temple, Deogarh, Uttar Pradesh
- Shantinatha temple, Halebidu, Karnataka
- Shantinatha Basadi, Jinanathapura, Karnataka
- Shantinatha temple, Khajuraho, Madhya Pradesh
- Shantinath Jain temple, Kothara, Gujarat
- Shantinatha temple, Ramtek, Maharashtra
- Shantinath Jain Teerth, Indapur, Maharashtra

== See also ==
- Shantinatha Shiva Temple, Hindu temple in Chandrakona, West Bengal, India; dedicated to Shiva
- Shantinatha Charitra, 14th-century biography of Shantinatha in Sanskrit
- Shantinath Desai, 20th-century Indian writer
