= Semliya =

- Village
- Location within Madhya Pradesh
- Coordinates: 23.4586°N 75.1017°E
- Country: India
- State: Madhya Pradesh
- District: Ratlam
- Elevation: 495 m (1,624 ft)
- Time zone: UTC+5:30 (IST)
- PIN: 457222
- Telephone code: 07412

Semliya is a small village/hamlet 4 kilometres (2.5 mi) east of Namli in Ratlam district in the Indian state of Madhya Pradesh.

Semliya is among the five most ancient pilgrimage sites for Jains of Malwa. It contains the temple of the 16th Jain tirthankar, Shri Shantinath.

== Shri Semliyaji ==
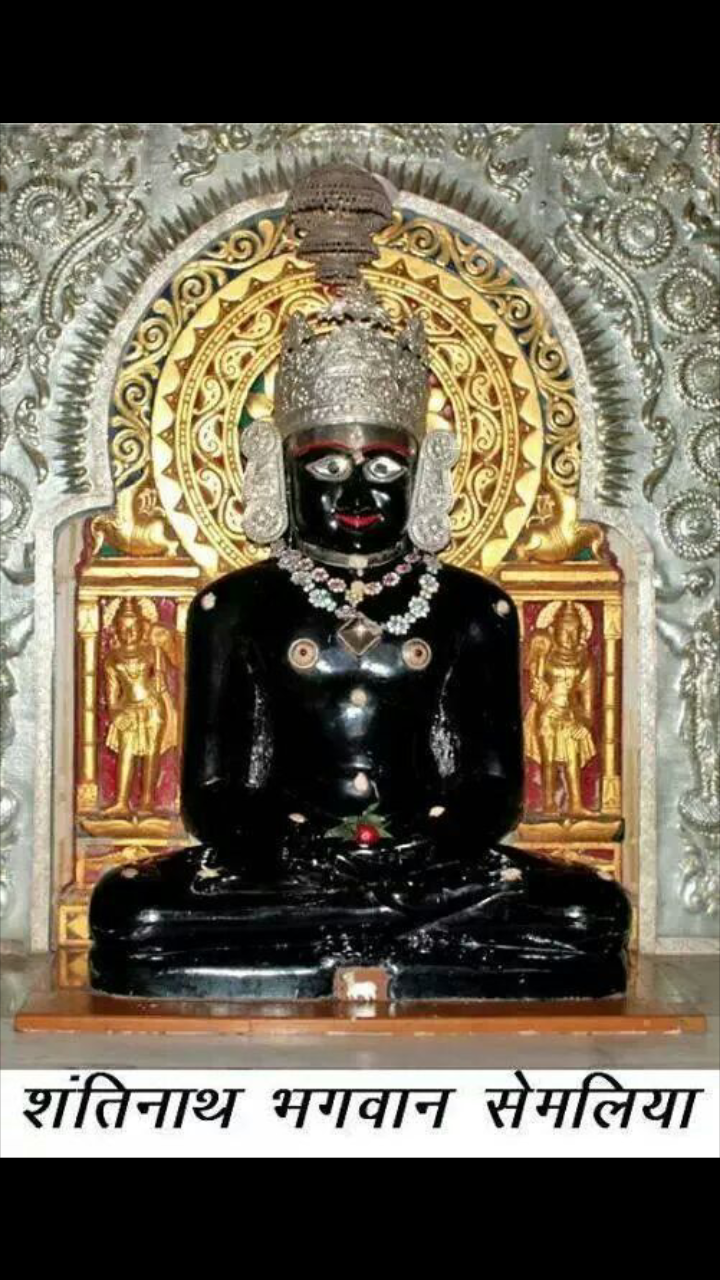
Idol of Tirthankar Shantinath

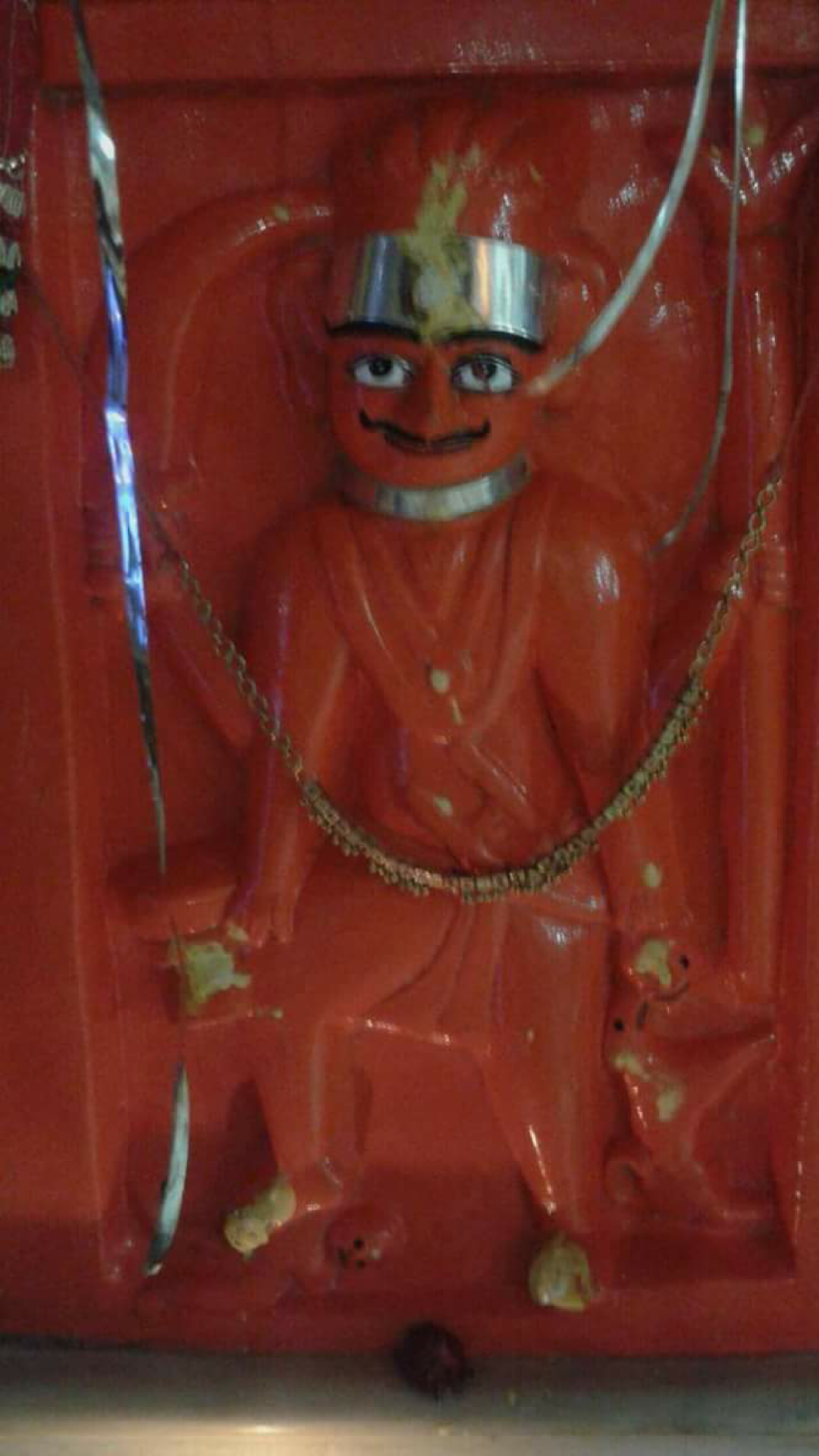
Idol of Adhishtayak Dev now worshipped as Bheruji

Shri Semliyaji is the temple of 16th Jain Tirthankar Shantinath. It is one of five most ancient pilgrimages of Malwa: Semliyaji, Bhopawar, Maksi, Mandav, and Vai Parshwanath.

The 41 inch idol of Shantinath was discovered and the temple erected 2300 years ago during the rule of King Samprati. The King ordered his workers to build a tunnel from Ujjain to the temple's Sanctuary for the convenience of those traveling to the temple. The tunnel is no longer in use.

The temple was first renovated 1700 years ago by shroff Bhima Mahajan. Evidence of these early renovations include markings of a clenched human fist on a marble pillar. No detailed markings of temple renovation have yet been identified for other Malwa pilgrimage sites.

Before its first renovation, the temple reflected tapagacchiya yati tradition. According to legend, before Vir Sawant (933, 1700 AD) the four foundation pillars traveled through immense skies during the tantrik war and landed on earth via Yatiji. The war marks are the fist, sword, arrow and bardiche. The four pillars are still standing. Occasionally, percolation of water-milk on pillar surfaces has been observed, and since 2000 the percolation has been observed on some parts of the sanctuary as well. In 2011 the percolation of saffron water was recorded. Every year during the festival of the Lord's birth, thousands of devotees come to the temple and extract some part of the percolation onto money bills, clothing, etc. in a belief that it will bring them great fortune.

The temple was famous in ancient times as well due to its presence on Delhi (known at that time as "Indrarastha"), Mandav route. According to texts, Acharya Jinkushalsuri (founder of the clan Khattargachh) marched a sangha from Jaisalmer to Mandav 9,000 years ago. He rested at Mandav and ordered that an idol be chiseled from a mineral rock. The idol is still in existence.

Five hundred forty five years ago, Acharya Lakshmisagarsuri visited Semliya with his sangha and erected three other idols, one of which is a tirthankar Adinath under a kalpvraksha tree sitting on a peacock surrounded by a serpent. When recently gacchadhipati Acharya Gunsagarsuri visited the temple, he stated that he had seen an identical idol at Siddhanchal and offered the services of the sangha Mumbai-Sammetshikhar-Girnar-Palitana to locate the twin idol.

In order to locate and secure the site of Temple, the ruler Acharya envisioned in meditation an idol of a god wearing a crown and smirking while riding a lion with a drum in his right hand, an ewer in his left hand, a knife in his waistband with many ancient symbols embossed on it, a beast under its right leg and a small animal near its left foot. It is said that the famous Mughal emperor Aurangzeb and his army expedition destroyed every Jain and Hindu temple between Delhi and Mandav, and although the emperor passed through a royal route while on expedition, the power of the god prevented him from noticing it before he destroyed it. The ruins of Mandav temples are proof of the expedition's destruction. Noteworthy is the Agarji Shantinath temple in Ratlam, which was protected at the time of the expedition by those who erected towers overnight. Over time due to the frequent coating of saffron, the idol's features became distorted such that pilgrims mistook it for a god Manibhadra idol. But the coating cracked in 1990 and the original features of the idol can now be clearly viewed. As there is no description of such a God in Jain manuscripts, people now worship them as god Bherujis.

The idol feline cats are still intact after recent renovation, funded by 50 lakhs Sadhus (the shravaks), who had provided large donations maintained in perpetuity.

The renovation of this temple was finished in 2000 on the day of Chairs Sudi. The idols of Gautama Swami, Shasan Devi and Nirvani Devi were installed, as well as a guru Mandir with idols of Acharya Jwersagarsuriji, Anandsagarsuriji, and Dharmsagarsuriji. Thirteen flags were hoisted on this occasion and since then many Sadhus and Sadhvis have spent Choumasa at the temple.

The arrangement of this Tirtha is governed by the "Shri Shantinath Shwetambar Jain Mandir Trust". This Tirtha has two asylums for Sadhu Sadhvis, eight halls including one office and three dining halls, a kitchen and twelve additional rooms.

Over the past several years, pilgrims regularly visit the temple sight. Semliya is 17 kilometers east from Ratlam Namli Road, which connects to this road via another road approximately five minutes travel distance away. Semliya is 15 kilometers from Bhopawar, 130 kilometers from Mandav, 24 kilometers from Vibrod and 85 kilometers from Nageshwar. The temple can be accessed hourly by bus or train from Ratlam (Western Railway).
