= Naugaza Digambar Jain temple =

Naugaza Jain temple
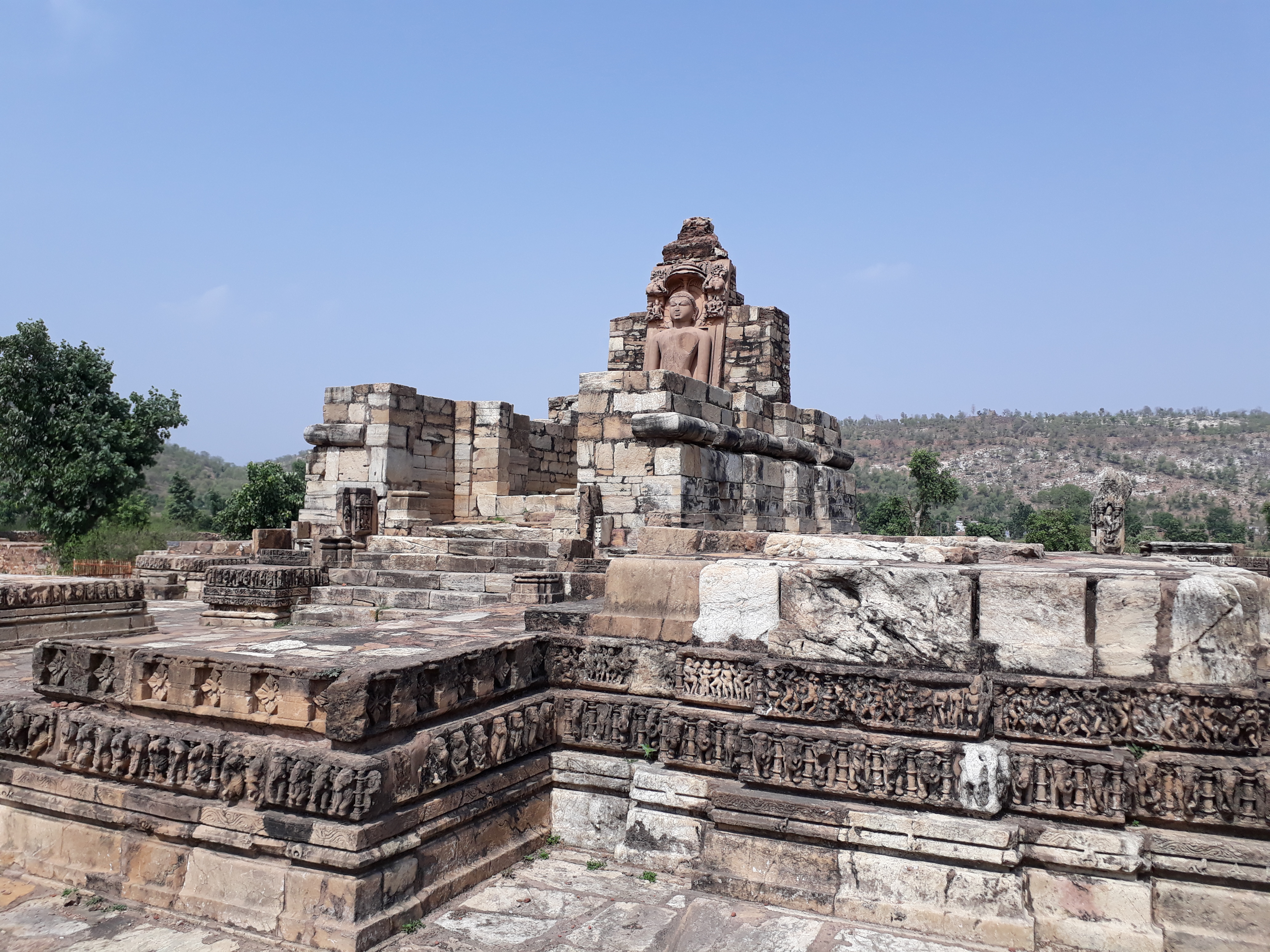
- Shantinath Jain temple

- Location of Mahavira Derasar in Rajasthan

Religion
- Affiliation: Jainism
- Deity: Shantinatha
- Festival: Mahavir Jayanti

Location
- Location: Rajgarh of Alwar District, Rajasthan
- Coordinates: 27°14′46.4″N 76°20′56″E

Architecture
- Style: Gurjara-Pratihara
- Established: 922 A.D.

The Naugaza Digambar Jain temple is situated near Naugaza in Alwar District, Rajasthan. The temple is situated near Neelkanth temple, Alwar.

== History ==
According to an inscription in the National Museum, this temple was constructed on the 13th day of the dark half of month Vaisakha, the second month in Hindu calendar, in VS 979 (c. 922-23 CE) during the reign of Gurjara-Pratihara ruler Mahipala I Deva of Kannauj. The inscription mentions Sarvadeva of Simhapadra as the architect of the temple. Only a colossal 5.33 metres (17.5 ft) statue of Jain Tirthankara Shantinatha remains intact. The colossal statue is built in Digambara style.

== History ==
According to an inscription, this temple was constructed on the 13th day of the dark half of the month of Vaisakha in V.S. 979 (c. 922-23 CE), during the reign of the Gurjara-Pratihara ruler Mahipala I of Kannauj. The inscription therefore provides a comparatively precise date for the Jain establishment and places its construction within the period of Gurjara-Pratihara rule in northern India. The inscription mentions Sarvadeva of Simhapadra as the architect of the temple.

The naming of Sarvadeva in the inscription is particularly significant because it preserves the identity and place of origin of a craftsman associated with the construction of the monument. Only a colossal 5.33-metre (17.5 ft) statue of the Jain Tirthankara Shantinatha remains intact. The colossal statue is represented in the Digambara tradition. The surviving image represents Shantinatha standing in the kayotsarga posture. The loss of most of the surrounding architectural structure means that the monumental image is now the principal surviving element of the medieval Jain temple.

== Shantinatha image ==
The principal surviving monument at Naugaza is the 5.33-metre (17.5 ft) image of Shantinatha. The Tirthankara is represented nude and standing upright, consistent with Digambara Jain iconography. The monumental scale of the image indicates that it formed the principal cult image of a considerably larger Jain religious structure, of which only fragmentary remains survive.

== Historical context ==
The Naugaza monument forms part of the medieval archaeological landscape surrounding Neelkanth in the Rajgarh area of Alwar district. The region preserves monuments belonging to the Gurjara-Pratihara period, including the nearby Neelkanth temple. The dated inscription of V.S. 979 (922–23 CE) is particularly important for the chronology of the site because it associates Jain religious patronage in the region with the reign of Mahipala I.

== Conservation ==
The temple is protected by the Archaeological Survey of India. The surviving Shantinatha image and the remains of the Jain temple form part of the protected archaeological complex in the vicinity of Neelkanth.

== Gallery ==
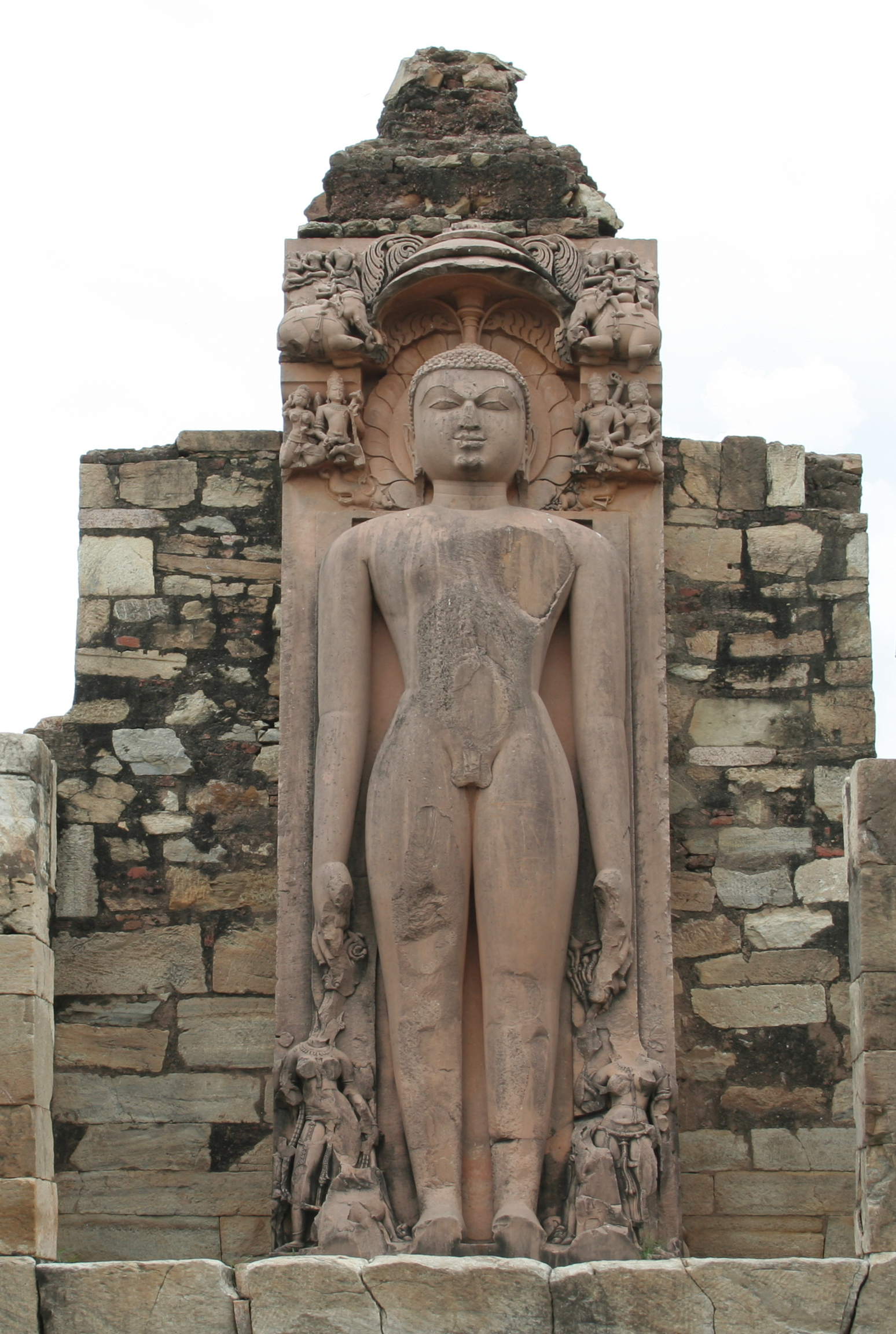
Colossal statue of Shantinath

== Conservation ==
The temple is now protected by Archaeological Survey of India.

== See also ==
- Jainism in Rajasthan
- Mahavira Jain temple, Osian
- Neelkanth temple
