= Shantinath Jain temple, Kothara =

Śvetāmbara Jain temple in Kutch

Shantinath Jain temple
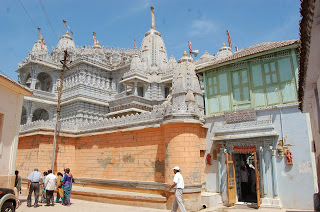
- Shantinath Jain Derasar

- Location of Shantinath Derasar in Gujarat

Religion
- Affiliation: Jainism
- Sect: Śvetāmbara
- Deity: Shantinath
- Festival: Mahavir Jayanti

Location
- Location: Kothara, Kutch district, Gujarat
- Interactive map of Shantinath Jain temple
- Coordinates: 23°08′08.2″N 68°56′03.3″E

Architecture
- Creator: Shah Velji Malu, Shah Keshavji Nayak, Shivji Nensi and Osval Vanias
- Established: 1861
- Temple: 1

The Shantinath Jain temple is located in Kothara village of Kutch district, Gujarat, India. The temple is dedicated to the 16th Tirthankara Shantinatha and is an important place of pilgrimage for the followers of Jainism.

== History ==
The temple was built on the 13th day of Magha, the eleventh month in Hindu calendar, in V.S. 1918 (c. 1861 CE). The temple was constructed by Shah Velji Malu, Shah Keshavji Nayak, Shivji Nensi, and Osval Vanias of Kothara at £40,000. The architecture of the temple is inspired from the Jain temple in Ahmedabad. The temple was constructed by Mistris of Kutch under the supervision of Salat Nathu of Sabhrai. The idol of Shantinatha was installed by Acharya Ratnasagarsuri of Achal Gaccha of the Śvetāmbara Murtipujaka sect. In the famous poem 'Keshavji Nayak', this temple was compared to Meruprabha temple of Palitana temples, giving the temple the name 'Kalyan Tunk,' where 'tunk' refers to peak of a mountain, based on the iconic 'Nav Tunk' (9 peaks of temples) at Palitana temples.

== Architecture ==
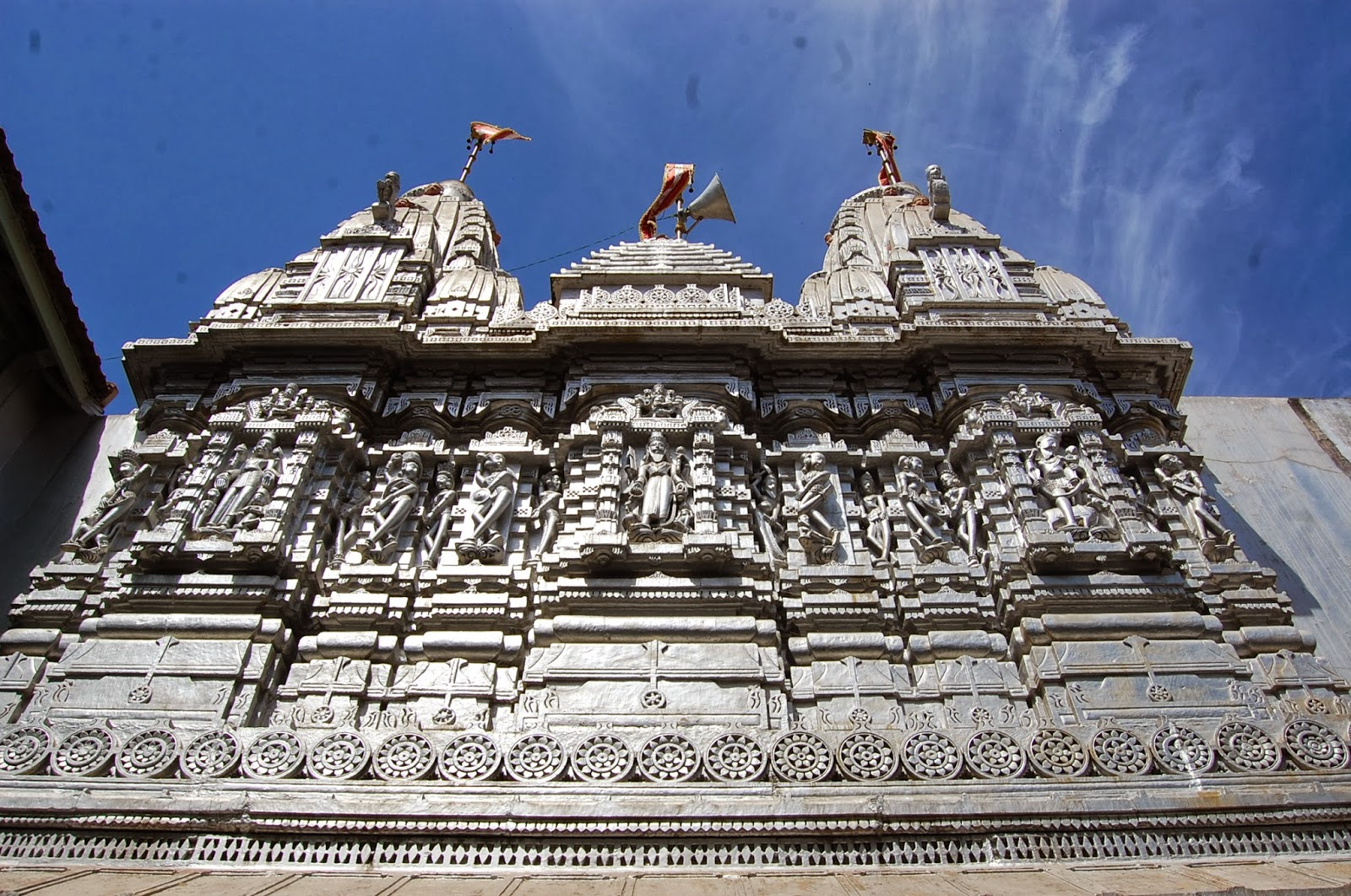
Carving on walls

The temple is surrounded by a high fort with five cells and a 12 by 6 feet (3.7 m × 1.8 m) gate. Through a very rich two-storied entrance, an outer yard surrounded by buildings marked for use by priests opens into a walled quadrangle with a shrine in each wall. At the center of the quadrangle, on a 6 feet 9 inches plinth reached by fifteen steps, is the temple, 78 feet long 69 feet wide and 73 1/2 feet high, supported on three sides by rich two-storied domed porches. The domed hall, rangmandap rises in two stories, and over the shrine is a spire with richly carved figure niches and mouldings.

Inside, the hall, mandap, surrounded by aisles or verandahs, with a richly designed pavement of different coloured marbles, has 22 pilasters, and 16 pillars, and a dome supported on eight pillars with foiled arches and struts. Inside of a wall, chiefly formed of 20 pillars richly carved with flowers, leaves and creepers is the shrine where supported on either side by seven small figures, is a large image of Shantinath in padmasana posture with a golden crown sitting on a richly carved marble throne. The upper story of the hall, reached by stone steps from the south-west porches, has a corridor with intricately carved shrines, each containing a large marble seated image. Moolnayak (main deity) of this temple is a 90 cm high, white-coloured idol of Shantinatha in Padmasana posture. Below the hall there is an underground shrine, with about twenty-five large white marble figures with precious stones studded into the eyes, chest, and arms. Besides the underground shrine, there is a bhonyra especially prepared against a time of trouble.

== Gallery ==
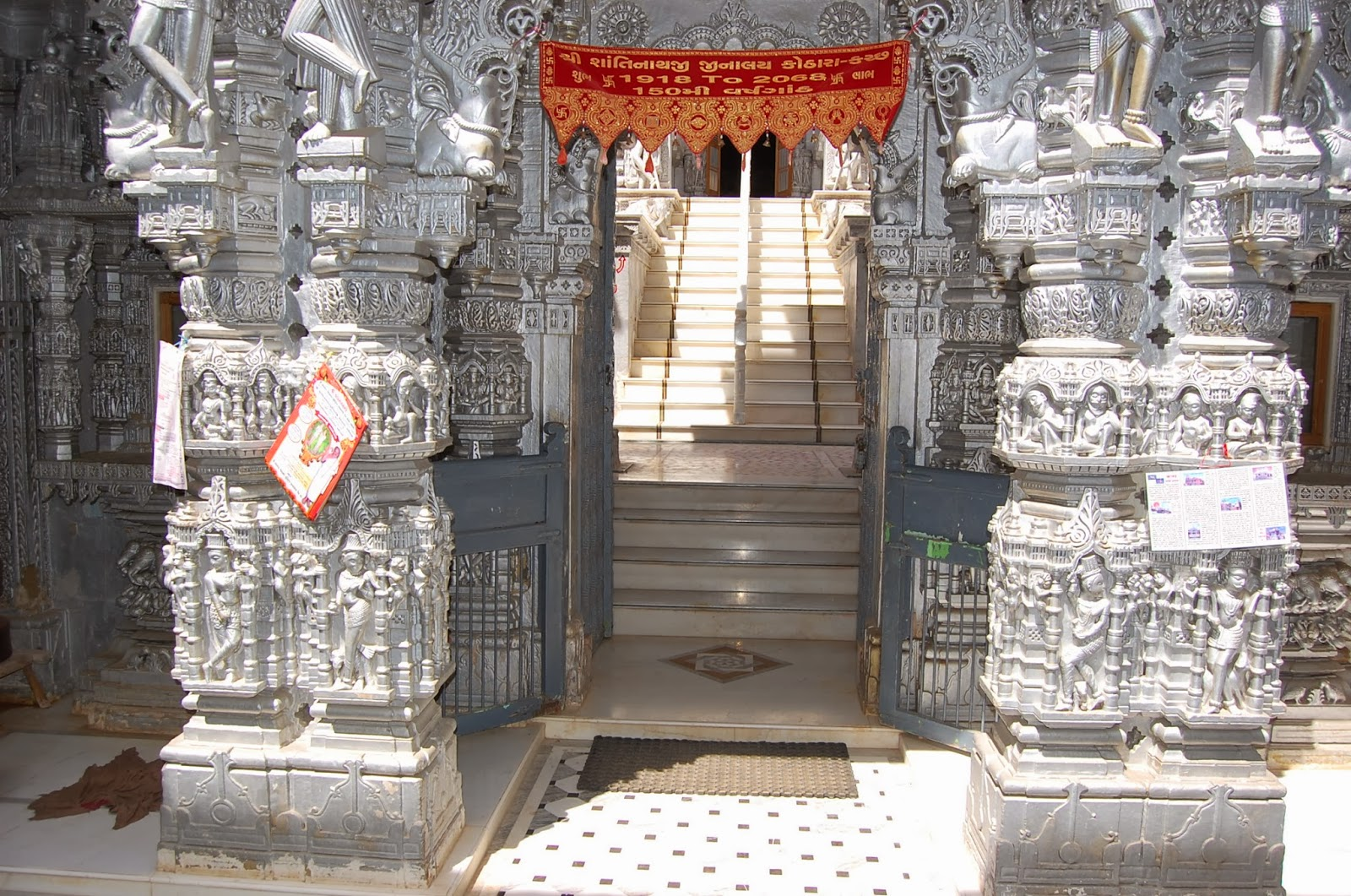
Entrance to Shantinath Jain Temple

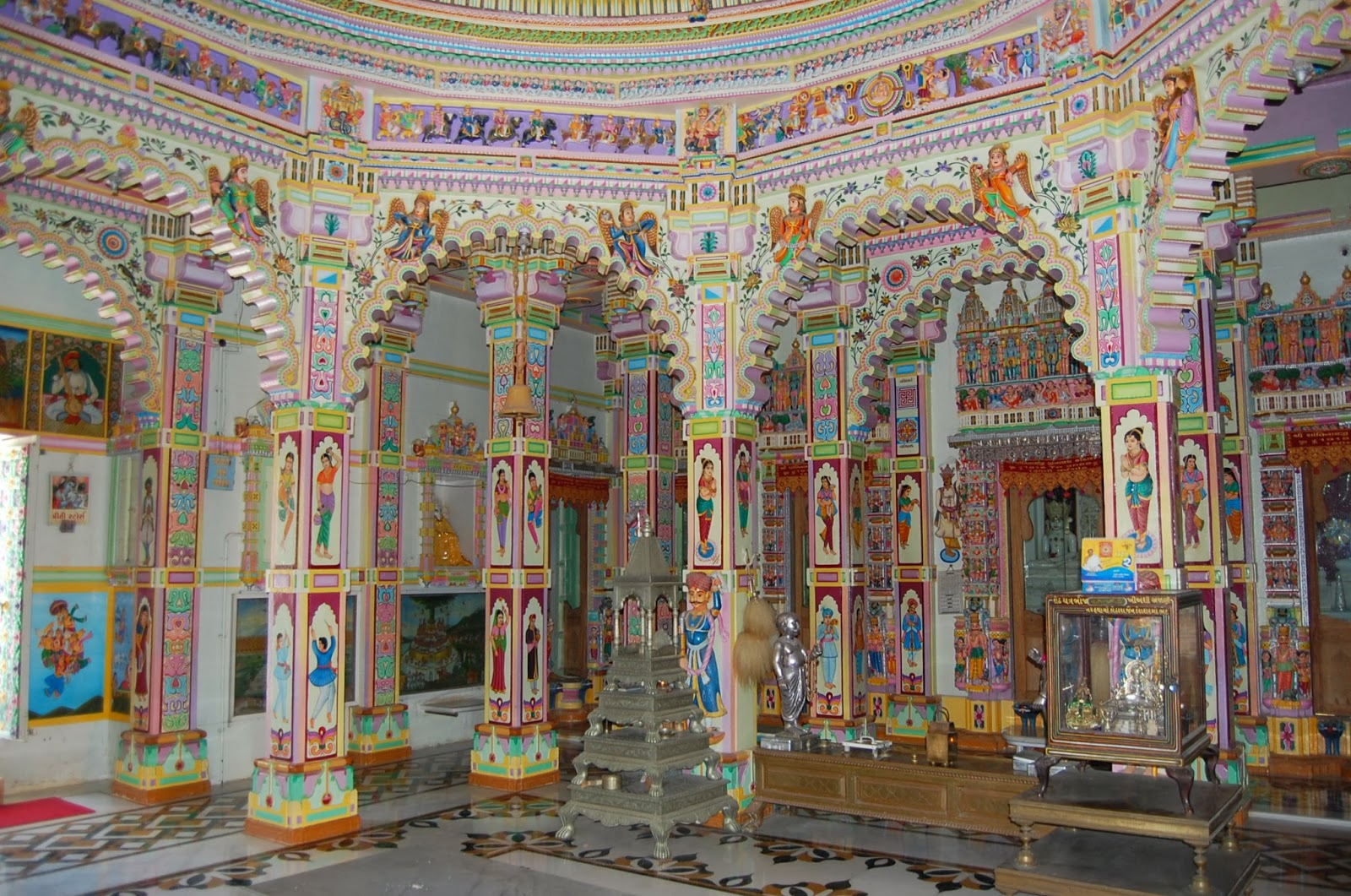
Inside the Jain Temple

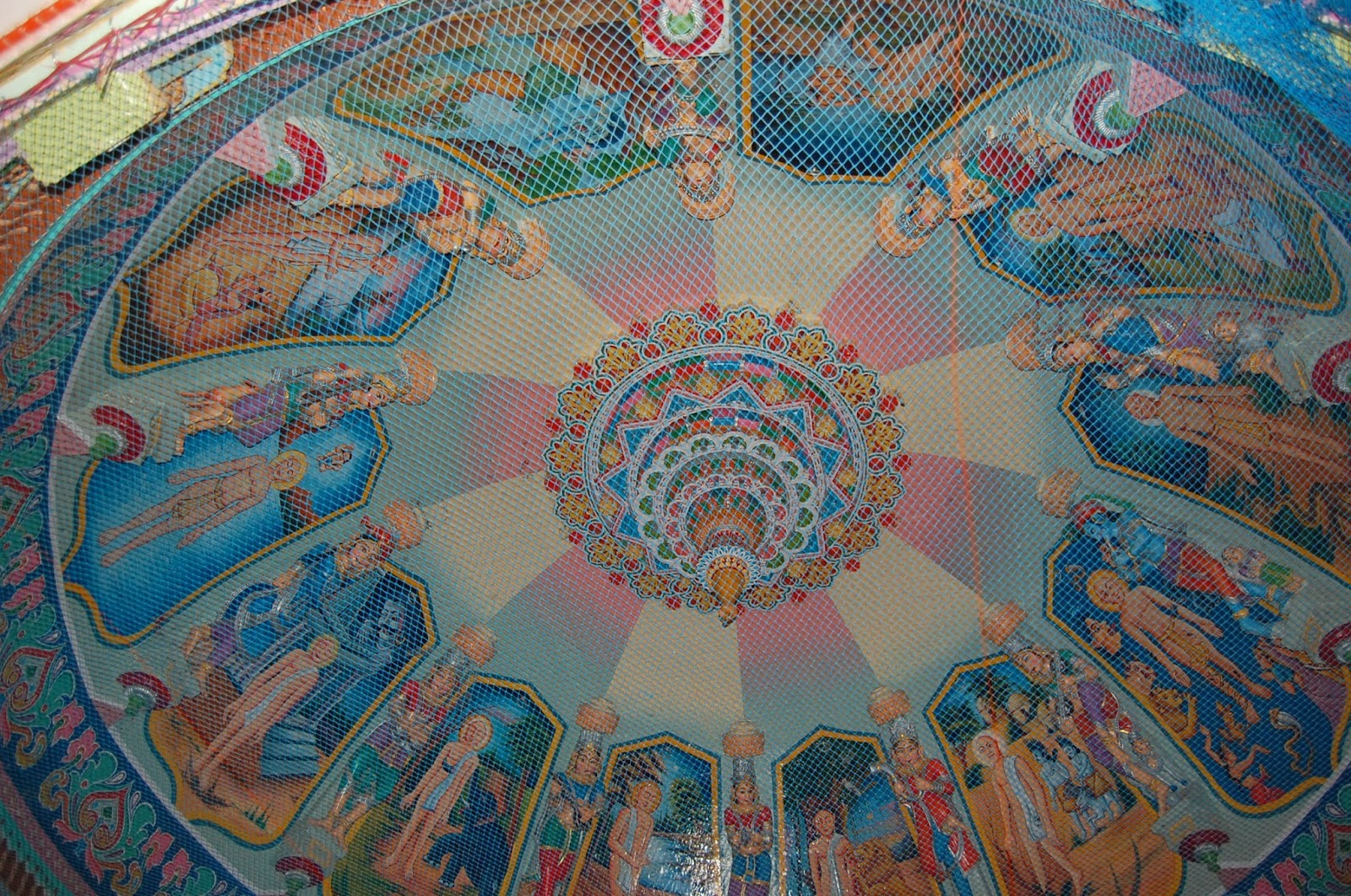
Picturesque inside temple dome.

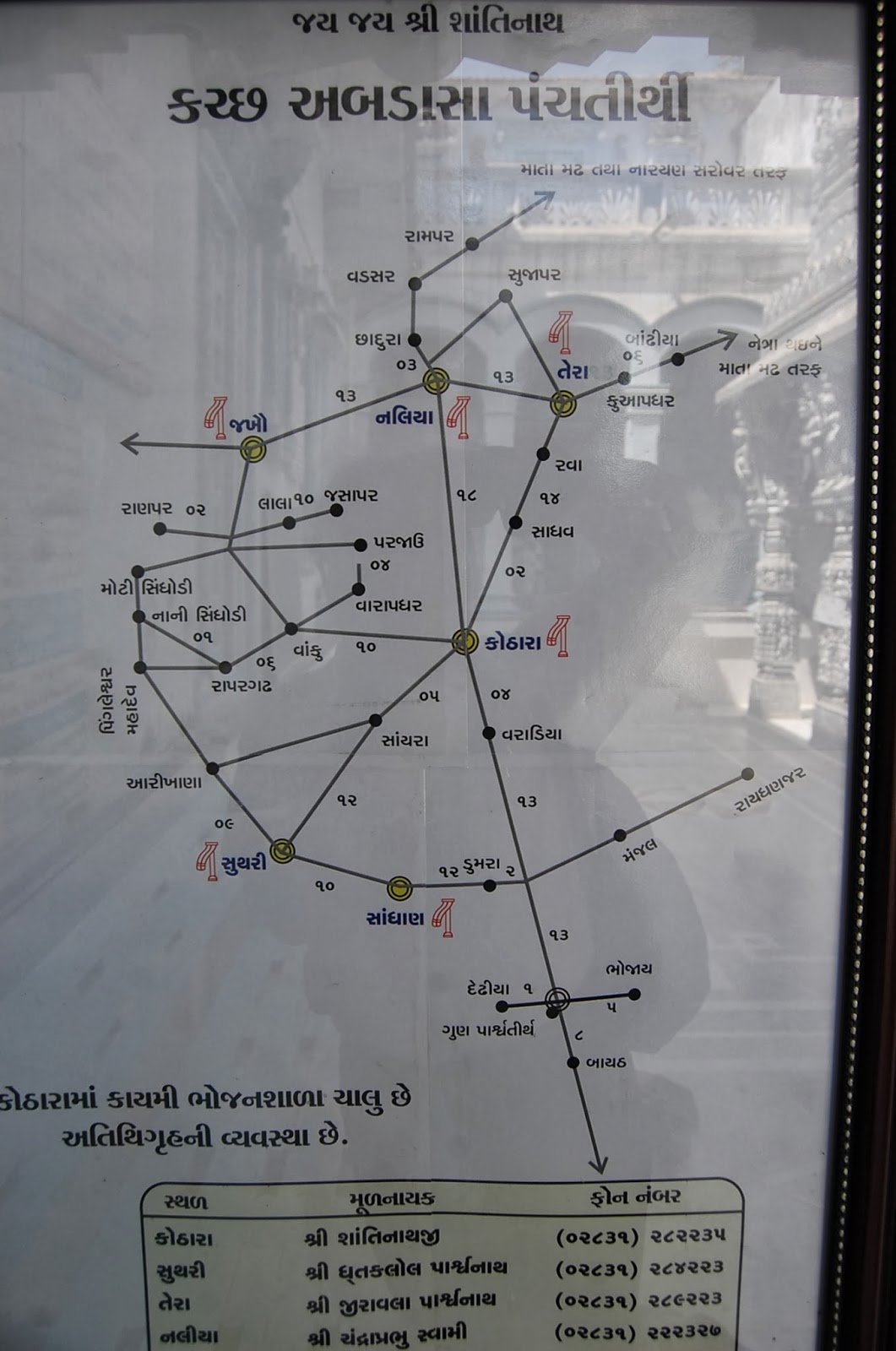
A map of Abdasa ni Panchtirthi – five Jain temples of Abdasa Taluka.

== See also ==
- Jainism in Gujarat
