= Shantinatha Charitra =

14th century Sanskrit text

Information
- Religion: Jainism (Śvetāmbara sect)
- Author: Acharya Ajitprabhasuri
- Language: Sanskrit
- Period: 1397 C.E.

Shantinatha Charitra is a Sanskrit text of the Śvetāmbara sect of Jainism that describes the life of 16th tirthankara Shantinatha. It was written by Acharya Ajitprabhasuri in 1397 CE. This text has been registered into Memory of the World Programme by UNESCO.

== History ==
This text was written in 1397 C.E. by Śvetāmbara monk Acharya Ajitprabhasuri on paper-palm leaves and was inherited by late Muni Punyavijayji through his family. He then donated it to Lalbhai Dalpatbhai Institute of Indology in 1961.

== Description ==
The manuscript talks about peace, non-violence and brotherhood through examples from Shantinatha's previous births and the final birth as a Tirthankara. It is a biographical text that adheres to the beliefs of the Śvetāmbara tradition. and was composed and written in the late 14th century. This is the oldest example of miniature painting. These illustrations are beautifully drawn in multi-colour and are examples of a highly evolved style of painting. It contains 10 images of scenes from the life of Shantinatha in the style of Jain paintings from Gujarat. The text contains miniature paintings drawn in multi-colour. This is the oldest example of Jain miniature painting. The ink used in the manuscript is gum lampblack and white paint made from mineral silver. This heritage document is written in Devanagari script.

== See also ==
- Shantinatha
- Jain art
- Jain literature
