= Shantinatha temple, Khajuraho =

Shantinatha temple
- शान्तिनाथ मन्दिर
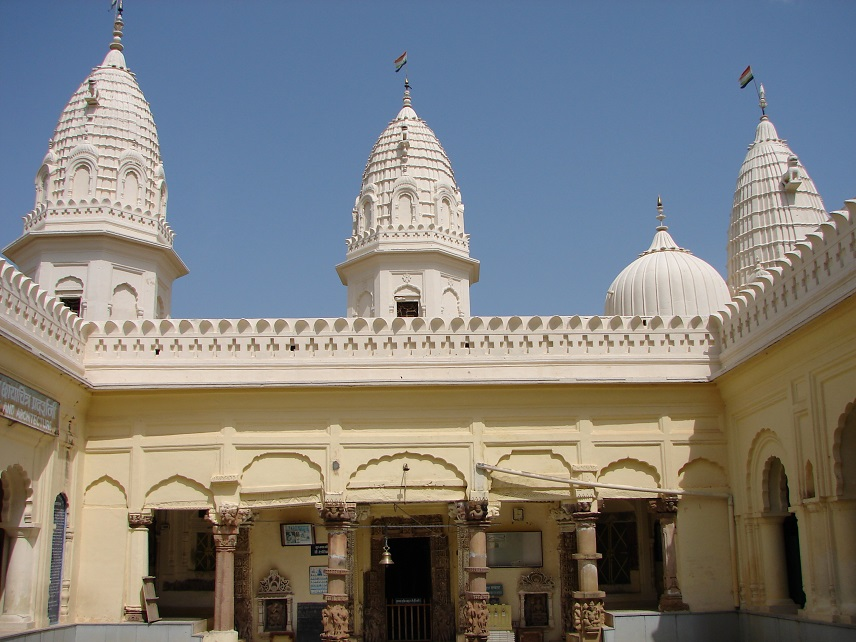
- renovated Shantinatha Jinalaya

- Location in Madhya Pradesh, India Shantinatha temple, Khajuraho (India)

Religion
- Affiliation: Jainism
- District: Chhatarpur
- Deity: Shantinatha

Location
- Location: Khajuraho
- State: Madhya Pradesh
- Country: India
- Interactive map of Shantinatha temple
- Coordinates: 24.844241°N 79.936022°E

Architecture
- Established: 11th century CE
- UNESCO World Heritage Site
- Official name: Khajuraho Group of Monuments
- Criteria: Cultural: (i)(iii)
- Designated: 1986 (session)
- Reference no.: 240

Shantinatha temple (IAST: Śāntinātha Mandir) is a Digambara Jain temple located among the Jain temple cluster in eastern Khajuraho in Madhya Pradesh, India. While its main deity is the Jain tirthankara Shantinatha, it includes 18 shrines with numerous Jain images.

The temple has been classified as a Monument of National Importance by the Archaeological Survey of India. This temple is part of UNESCO World Heritage Site along with other temples in Khajuraho Group of Monuments, listed for their testimony to the Chandela dynasty and their outstanding art and architecture.

== History ==
The temple incorporates two Chandella period shrines, along with fragment of other Chandella period temples. The present structure may have been constructed in 1870 CE, when a Gajarath festival was organized by Kanchhedtilal Jain of Nagaur marking a renewal of the site accompanied by installations of new images, as indicated by the inscriptions.

The pedestal of the 12 foot Shantinath image in the Shantinatha temple bears an inscription dated Samvat 1085 (1027-28 CE) mentioning the installation by Chandradeva, the son of Thakur Devadhar. The inscription is now hidden under plaster. The original Shantinatha temple has been incorporated the 19th century structure, and is now the main centre of Jain worship in Khajuraho.

== Architecture ==
Although the present-day temple structure features modern renovations, the nucleus of the temple is quite old. It features an oblong enclosure of shrine cells depicting the older sculptures. The temple has a courtyard. Two sides of the structure incorporate Chandella period structures. The temple and the images installed thus span 10 centuries.

The present structure is a quadrangle, as many Jain temples of the nineteenth century are, with an open courtyard in the middle. The older stone structure and elements are clearly seen embedded in the 19th century masonry structure.

Shrine 1 in the center contains the ancient Shantinath image which is flanked by smaller images of all the 24 tirthankara. The doorway includes the conventional images of goddess Ganga and Yamuna, and there is notable image of the guardian deity Kshetrapala. The 18 shrines house numerous 11/12th century and 19th/20th century images. Some of the ancient images were brought here from ruined Jain temples in Fatehpur (near Hatta in damoh dist) and Bilahri in Katni district. One of the wings of the quadrangle serves as a gallery displaying historical photographs and prints from early 2oth century.

== Sculptures ==
The sanctum of the temple has a 4.3 m high statue of Shantinatha. There are several other old as well as new Jain statues in the temple. One of the sculpture appears to be a carving of Mahavira's parents, which is noted for its artistic execution.

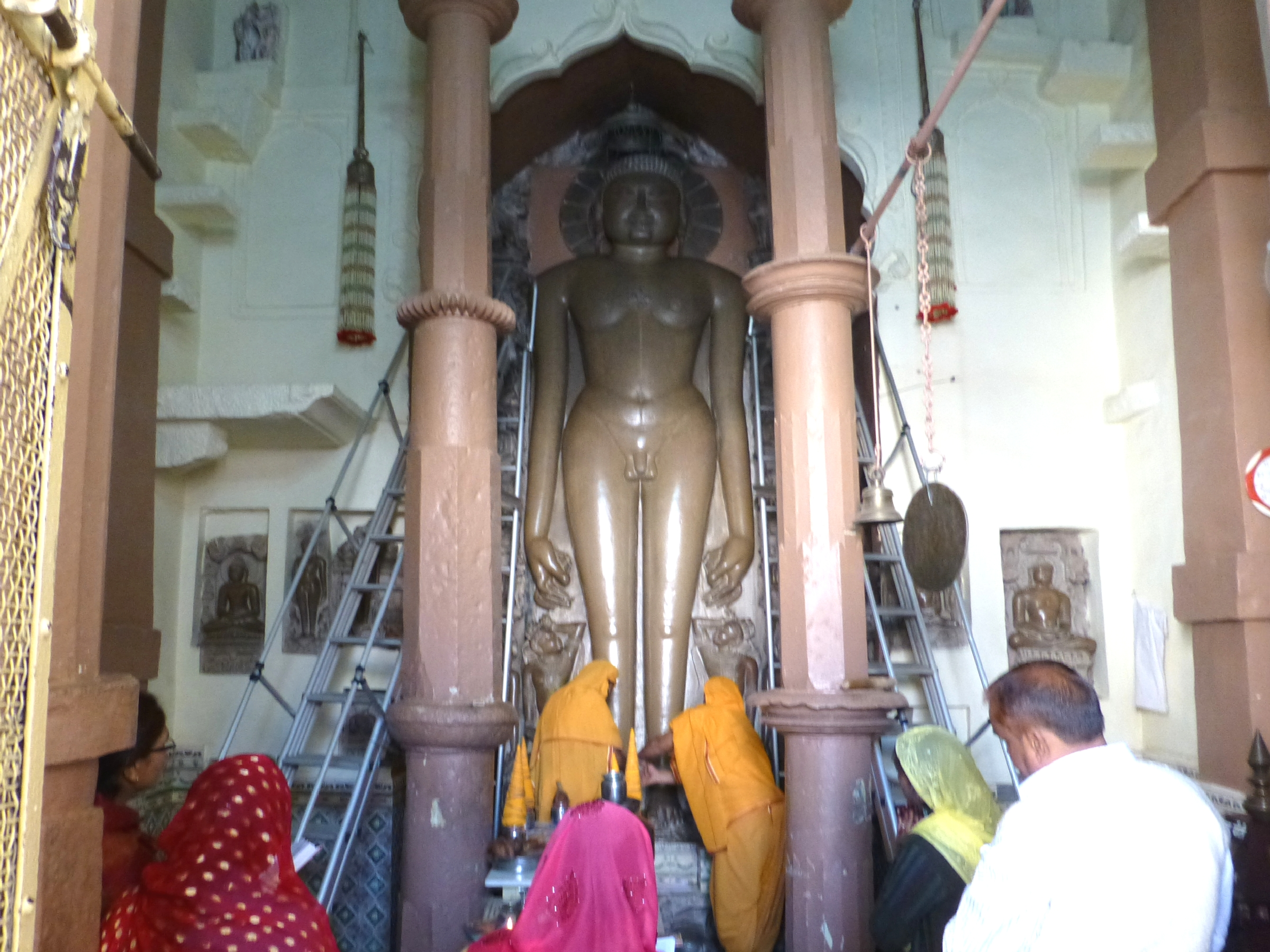
Lord Shantinatha, 1028 AD, shrine 1, with worshippers

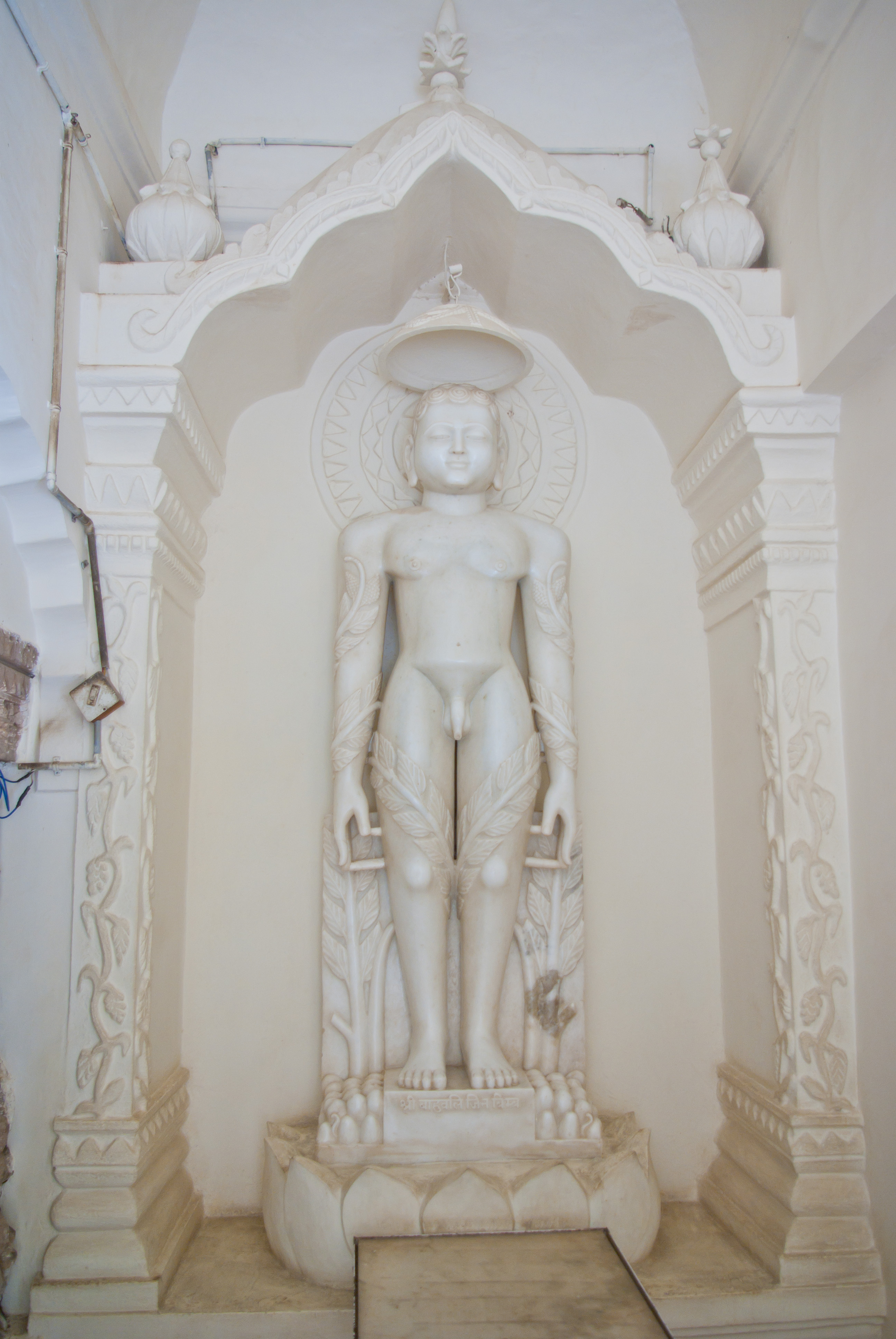
Lord Bahubali (modern), shrine 5

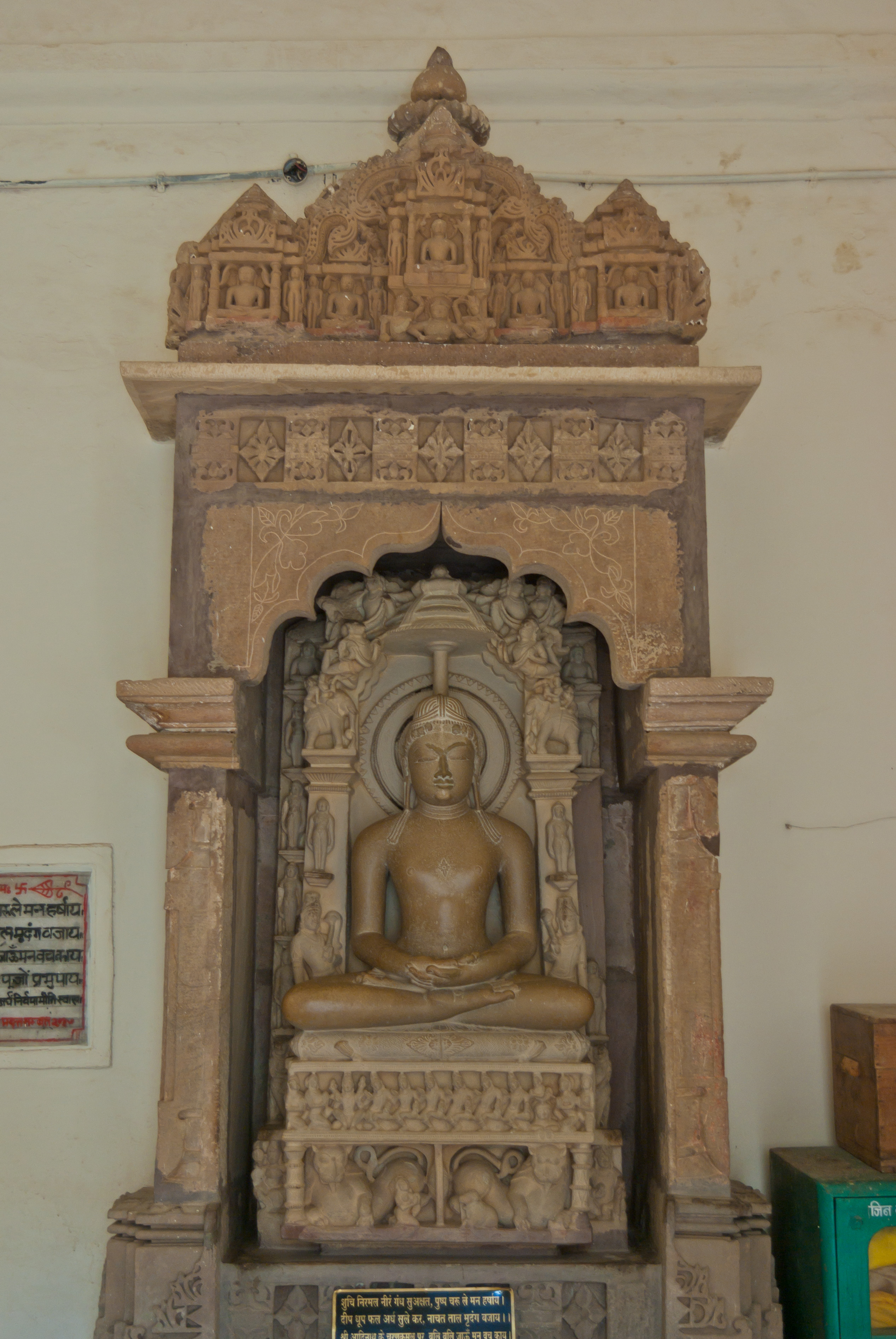
Lord Adinath, Chandella period, shrine 6 (Note Navagraha, Sarvanha and Chakreshwari in the platform.)

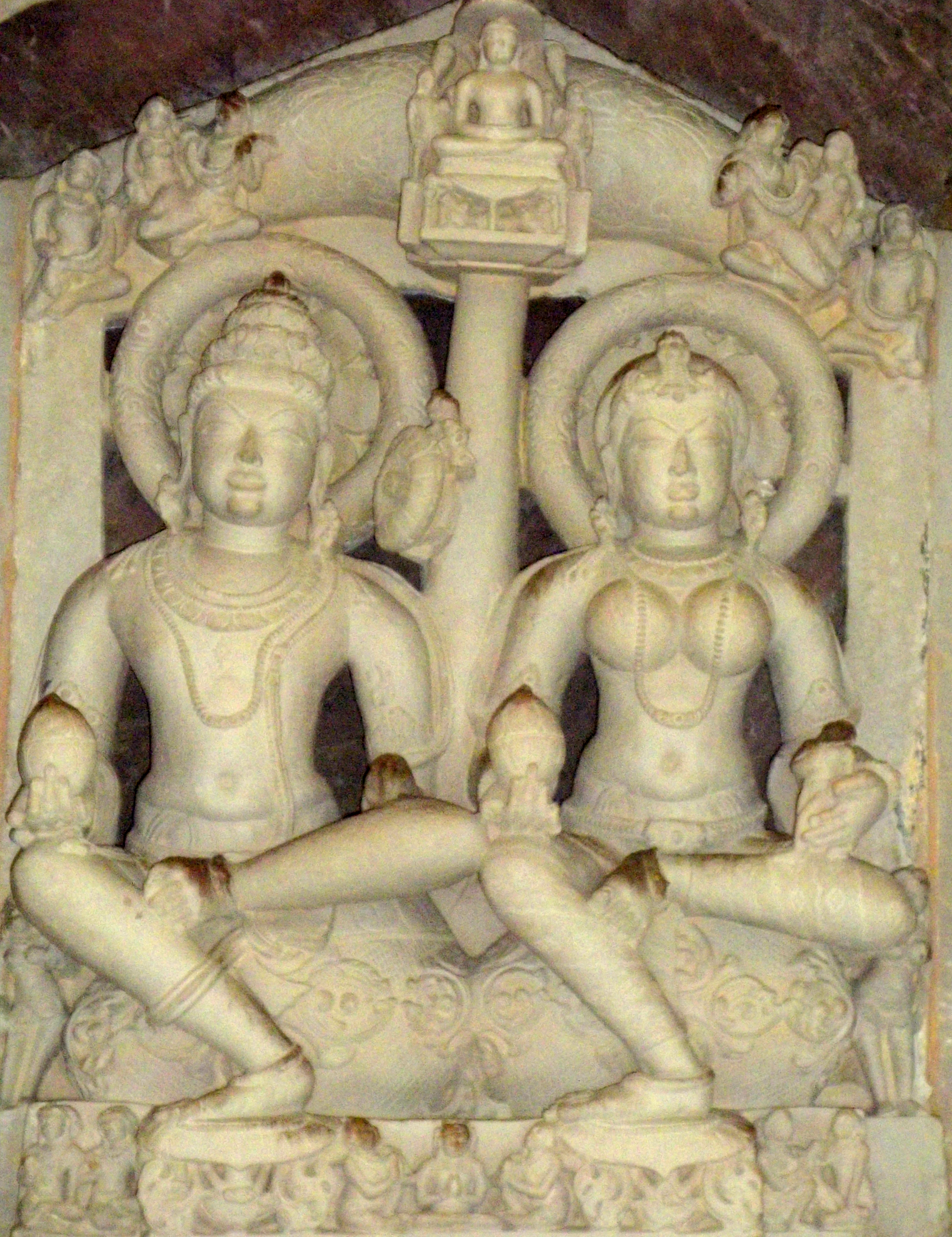
Parents of Tirthankara or Yaksha/Yakshi, Chandella period, shrine 10

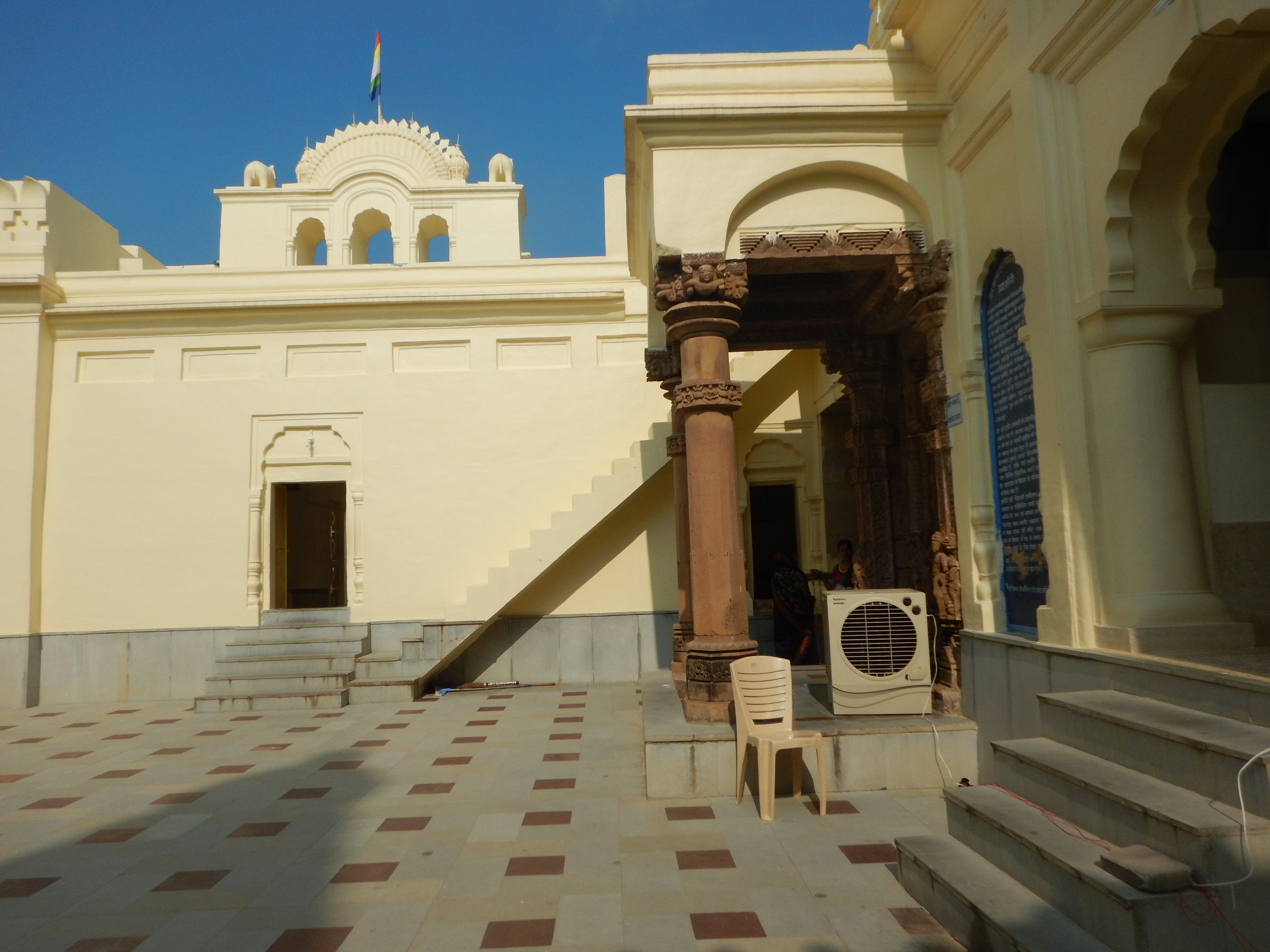
Entrance of shrine 14, Chandella period, 19th-century gateway in background
