= Shantinatha =

16th Tirthankara in Jainism in current cycle of Jain cosmology

- 16th Tirthankara, 5th Chakravarti, and 11th Kamadeva
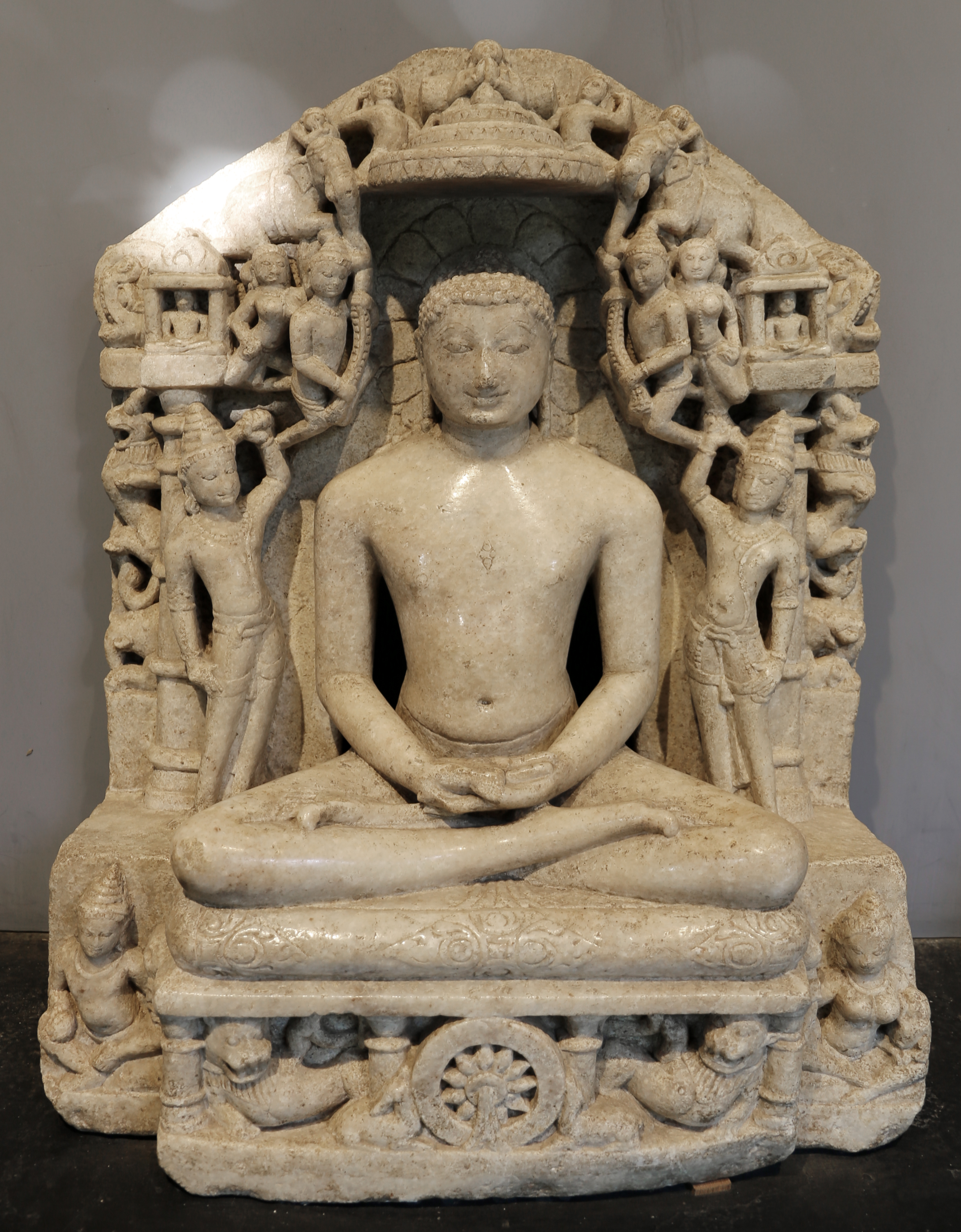
- A 12th century Jain idol of Tirthankara Shantinatha at Chhatrapati Shivaji Maharaj Vastu Sangrahalaya
- Venerated in: Jainism
- Predecessor: Dharmanatha
- Successor: Kunthunatha
- Symbol: Deer or Antelope
- Height: 40 bows (120 metres) (393.701 feet)
- Age: 100,000 years
- Tree: Nandi tree
- Color: Golden

Genealogy
- Born: Hastinapur
- Died: Sammed Shikhar
- Parents: Viśvasena (father); Acalādevī (mother)
- Spouse: Yaśomatī
- Dynasty: Kuruvaṁśa—Ikṣvākuvaṁśa

Śāntinātha (Sanskrit: शान्तिनाथ) or Śānti is the sixteenth tīrthaṅkara of Jainism in the present age (Avasarpini). According to Jain beliefs, he was one of the three tirthankaras to have also held the status of a Chakravarti (universal monarch) and a Kamadeva (being of supreme beauty) in the same lifetime. He is traditionally revered as the deity of peace (Shanti) and is invoked by devotees to avert calamities and epidemics.

Jain texts describe his life as a transition from imperial sovereignty to total renunciation. Born in Hastinapur to King Vishvasena and Queen Aćira of the Ikshvaku dynasty, he is said to have ruled for 25,000 years. As a Chakravarti, traditional accounts state he possessed the "fourteen jewels" (ratna) and "nine treasures" (nidhi), symbolizing absolute material dominion, before renouncing his empire to become a Jain monk. After sixteen years of asceticism, he is believed to have attained Kevala Jnana (omniscience) and subsequently achieved Moksha (liberation) at Shikharji.

Along with Rishabhanatha, Neminatha, Pārśvanātha and Mahavira, Shantinatha is considered one of the five most worshipped tirthankaras in the Jain tradition. He is the central figure in the Shantikarma rituals, performed to bring peace and ward off negative karmic influences. His legacy is preserved in major literary works like the Shantipurana (c. 10th century) by the poet Ponna and in significant architectural monuments. Prominent sites dedicated to him include the UNESCO World Heritage Shantinatha temple, Khajuraho, the Shantinatha Temple, Deogarh, the colossal statues at Gopachal, and major temple complexes at Hastinapur and Sonagiri.

== Legendary Biography ==
According to Jain cosmology, Shantinatha is the 16th tirthankara of the Avasarpiṇī (the present descending time cycle). (Note: Heinrich Zimmer: "The cycle of time continually revolves, according to the Jainas. The present "descending" (avasarpini) period was preceded and will be followed by an "ascending" (utsarpini). Sarpini suggests the creeping movement of a "serpent" (sarpin); ava- means "down" and ut- means up." A Tirthankara (ford-maker, saviour or spiritual teacher) signifies the founding of a tirtha, a passage across the sea of birth-and-death cycles.) He holds a unique position in Jain universal history as one of the three beings to attain the triple status of tirthankara, Chakravarti (Universal Monarch), and Kamadeva (Being of Supreme Beauty) within a single lifetime.

His successor, Kunthunatha, is said to have been born 1/2 palya after him.

=== Previous incarnations ===
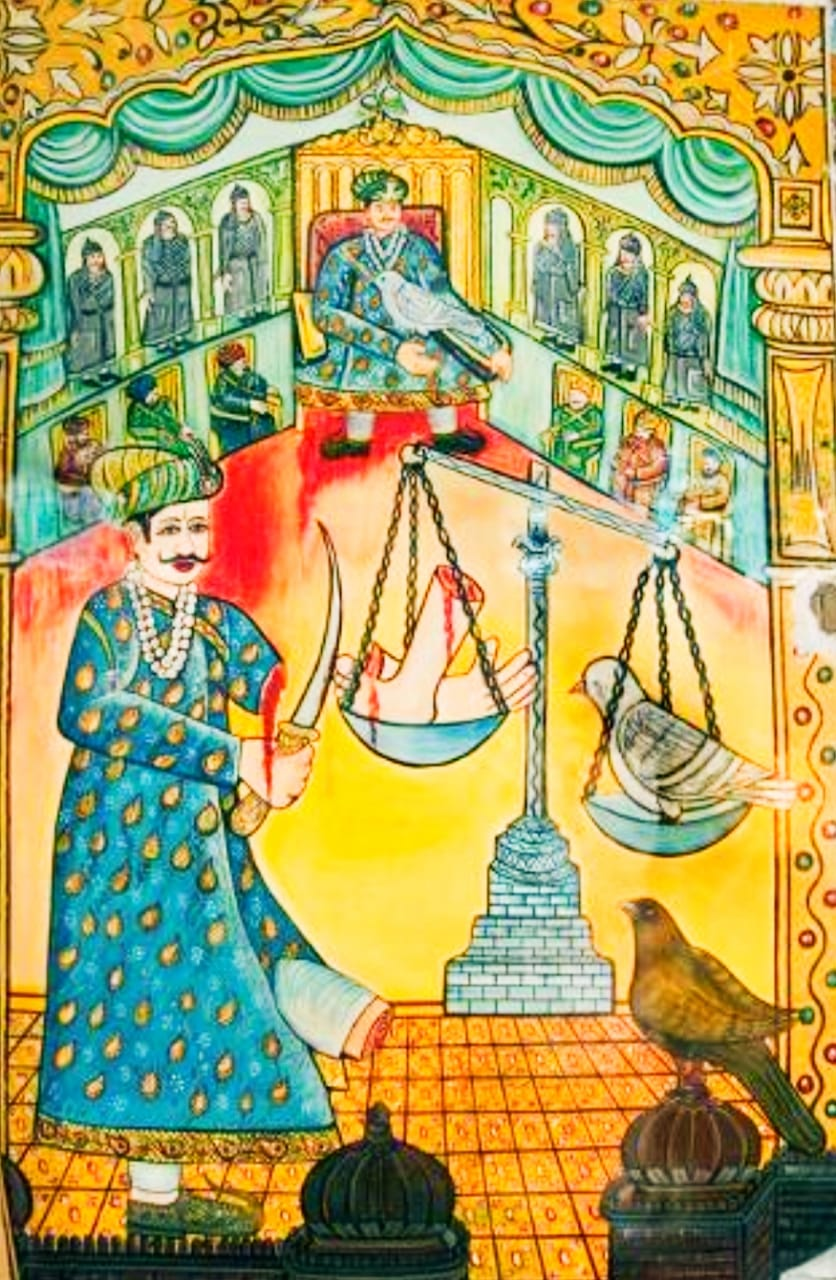
King Megharath, one of the Shantinatha previous incarnation, saving pigeons life by sacrificing his own limbs

Jain tradition holds that the soul of Shantinatha accumulated merit through a series of virtuous past lives before his final birth. Traditional accounts, such as Hemachandra's Trishashti-Shalakapurusha-Charitra, describe his life as King Srisena, a benevolent ruler who had two wives, Abhinanditā and Śikhinanditā. Abhinanditā is described as the mother of his two sons Induṣeṇa and Binduṣeṇa. In next birth, he is described as being born as Yugalika in Uttar Kurukshetra and after that as a Deva in Saudharma heaven.

In next birth as Amitateja, prince of Arkakirti, who later became a Jain monk under the influence of Acharya Abhinandana. followed by birth as a heavenly deva in 10th heaven Pranat (20 sagars life span) (Note: 1 sagars is several million years) After that he was born as Aparajit Baldeva in East Mahavideha (life span of 84,00,000 purva) (Note: 1 Purva is 8,400,000^{2} years) and then as a heavenly Indra in 12th heaven Achyuta (22 sagars life span). In the subsequent birth, he ruled as Vajrāyudha Chakri, the son of tirthankara Kṣemaṅkara in the East Mahavideha region, where he eventually renounced his throne to become a Jain ascetic with his father becoming an Arihant. He is said to have been named Vajrāyudha as his mother, Lakṣmīvatī's, dreamed of a thunderbolt as one of the fourteen auspicious dreams indicating that he would become a Vajrin (Indra). After that he was born as a heavenly deva in Navgraivayak heaven (25 sagars life span).

His most significant previous incarnation was as King Megharath, son of Dhanarath in East Mahavideha. In a famous legend depicted frequently in Jain art, King Megharath demonstrated absolute compassion by saving a pigeon from a pursuing falcon (who was a deity named Sarupa testing his vow). He did this by slicing off his own flesh equal in weight to the bird to satisfy the falcon's hunger, symbolizing the ultimate commitment to ahimsa. Following this life, he was reborn as a heavenly deva in Sarvartha Siddha heaven (33 sagars life span) before descending for his final incarnation.

=== Birth and Early Life ===
Shantinatha was born in the ancient capital of Hastinapur to King Vishvasena and Queen Aćira of the Ikshvaku dynasty. His birth occurred on the 13th day of the dark half of the Jestha month. Tradition states that his mother saw the auspicious dreams (fourteen according to the Śvetāmbara tradition and sixteen according to the Digambara tradition) foretelling the birth of a tirthankara.

He was named Shantinatha ("Lord of Peace") because his presence in the womb was believed to have pacified a raging epidemic and quelled all misery in the kingdom. Chronologically, he was born three sagara (ocean-measured time units) less three-quarters palya after the fifteenth tirthankara, Dharmanatha.

=== Reign as Chakravarti ===
Before embarking on his spiritual conquest, Shantinatha achieved the zenith of material power. Standing 40 dhanusha (approximately 120 feet) tall, he spent 25,000 years as a youth and ascended the throne at the age of 25,000. He ruled for 50,000 years, during which he conquered the six distinct divisions of the earth, establishing a global empire. He married a beautiful princess Yaśomatī.

As the fifth Chakravarti, canonical texts attribute to him the possession of the "14 jewels" (ratna) and "nine treasures" (nidhi). These assets included animate and inanimate symbols of sovereignty, such as the divine wheel (chakraratna), the state elephants and the divine horses. His reign is traditionally characterized as a Golden Age of justice and is associated with the Shantikarma rituals, which are performed to ward off diseases, famine, and foreign invasions. During his time, an epidemic of epilepsy broke out and he helped to control it.

=== Renunciation and Omniscience ===
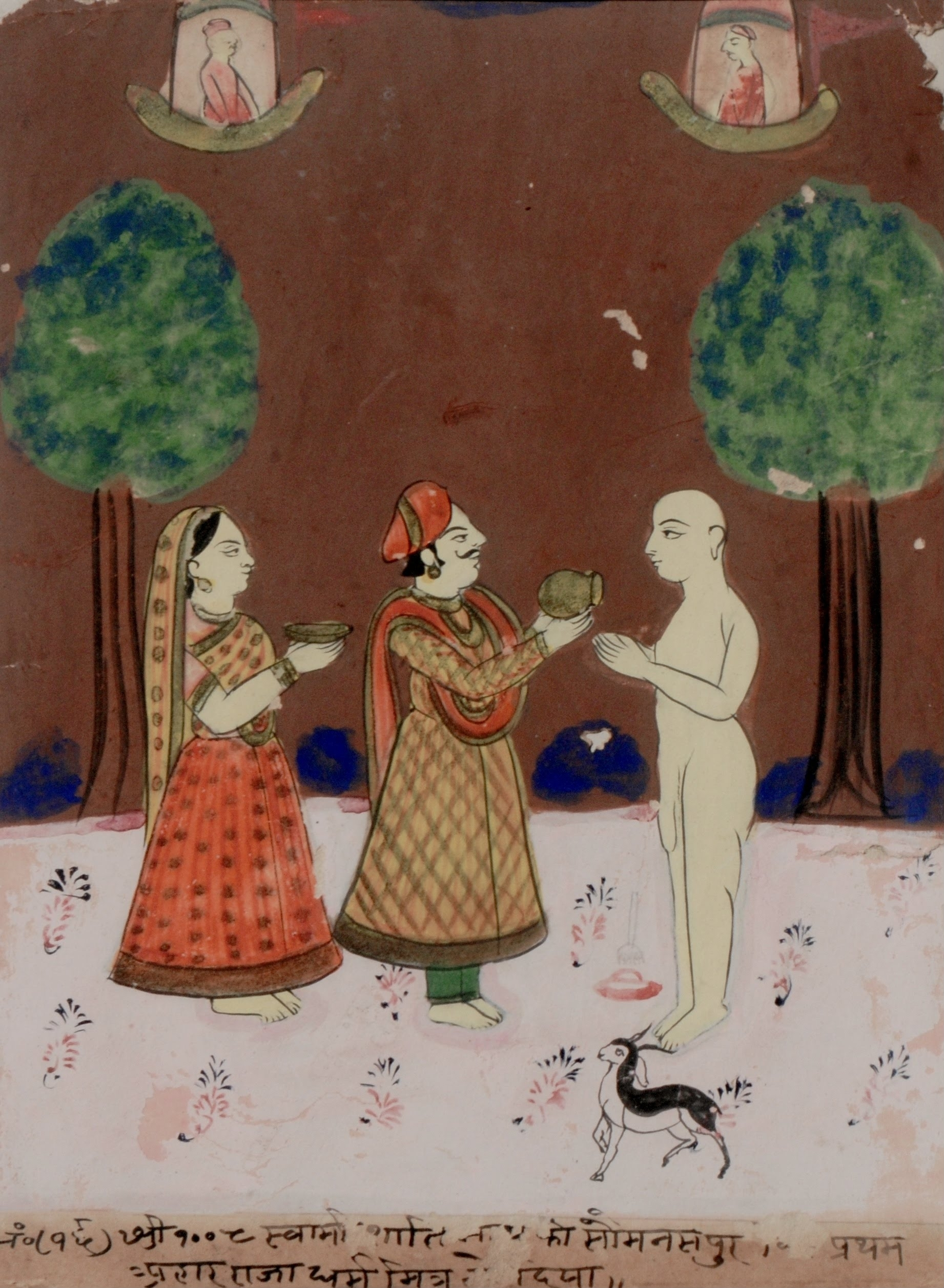
King Dharma Mitra offering first meal to tirthankara Shantinatha, 19th century (Digambara Tradition)

Despite possessing absolute material dominion, Shantinatha renounced his empire upon realizing the transient nature of worldly power. He adopted the life of a Jain monk, engaging in rigorous penance for sixteen years. He meditated under a nandi tree, abstaining from food and sleep, until he destroyed the ghati (obscuring) karmas. On the ninth bright day of the month of Pausha, he attained Kevala Jnana (omniscience).

After achieving kevala jnana he visited Somanasapur, and was offered first ahara (food) by King Dharma Mitra and his wife.

=== Nirvana and moksha ===
He is said to have lived 1 lakh (100,000) years and spent many years spreading his knowledge. On the 13th day of the dark half of the month Jyestha (May–June), he attained nirvana at Sammed Shikharji, (Note: Some texts refer to the place as Mount Sammeta. This place is revered in Jainism because 20 out of 24 Jinas died here.) known contemporaneously as the Parasnath Hills in northern Jharkhand.

The yaksha and yakshi of Shantinatha are Kimpurusha and Mahamanasi according to Digambara tradition and Garuda and Nirvani according to Śvētāmbara tradition.

=== Disciples ===
According to Jain texts, Cakrayudha Svami was the leader of the Shantinatha disciples.

== Legacy ==
=== Worship ===
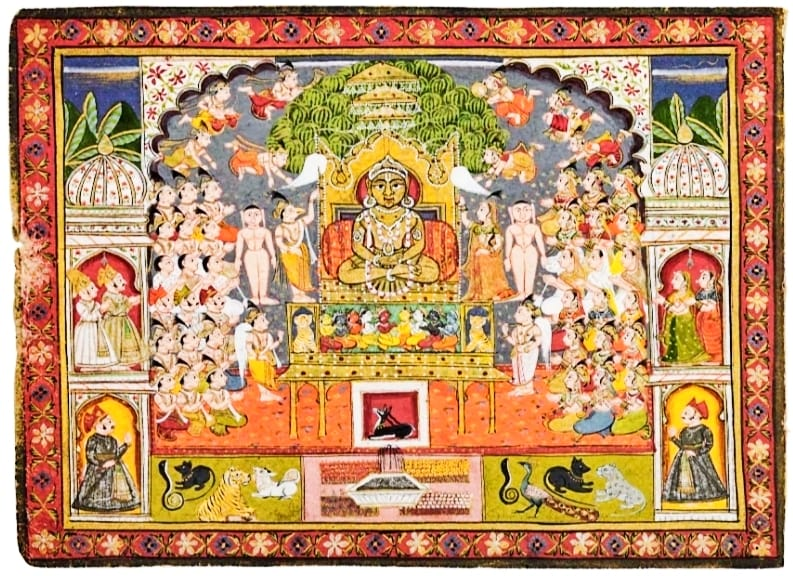
Miniature painting of Shantinatha surrounded by ascetics, devotees and animals, 18th century

Śhāntinātha being an idea of peace and tranquillity, it is believed that chanting the name Śhāntinātha averts calamities and epidemics and bestows welfare to worshippers. In the Śvetāmbara tradition, Nirvāṉi, the yakshi of Śhāntinātha, is also associated with Shantinatha as Śhānti-devī in prayers for peace. During the last rites, recitation of Namokar Mantra and hymns to the Jina and Śhāntinātha are performed.

Shanti Snaatra Puja is a special prayer for universal peace and the welfare of all living beings. During the prayer, offerings are made 27 or 108 times to Shantinatha. The Laghnu-Shanti-stavaa, compiled by Manadeva suri in the 7th century, is a hymn to Shantinatha full of tantric usage and identify Shantinatha as Siva, the Lord of Shanta. According to Jinaprabha Suri, the temples dedicated to Shantinatha existed in Kishkindha, Lanka and Trikuta.

According to Santistava compiled by Acharya Manadevasuri, an Acharya of the Śvetāmbara sect in the third century, mere recitation of Shantinatha's name negates all bad omens, brings peace and protects devotees from problems. Santistava is considered by Śvetāmbaras as one of the four most beautifully written stavans (hymn). Jinastotrāņi is a collection of hymn dedicated to Shantinatha along with Munisuvrata, Chandraprabha, Neminatha, Mahavira, Parshvanatha and Rishabhanatha. Other Śvetāmbara hymns that are dedicated to Shantinatha are the Ajit-Shanti Stotra (a hymn dedicated to Shantinatha and the 2nd Tirthankara Ajitanatha) and the Bruhad-Shanti Stotra (a hymn dedicated to Shantinatha that is recited during the Snaatra Puja as per the Śvetāmbara tradition). During the Chaityavandan (a ritual that consists of a series of hymns in obeisance to a Tirthankara), lay-followers of the Śvetāmbara tradition recite a hymn Sakalkushalvalli which is dedicated to Shantinatha and the 23rd Tirthankara Parshvanatha.

Samantabhadra's Svayambhustotra praises the twenty-four tirthankaras, and its eight shlokas (songs) adore Shantinatha. One such shloka reads:

First, Lord Śhāntinātha Jina, for a long period of time, wielded supremacy as a king and provided protection to his subject from enemies; later on, on his own, became an ascetic and, as the embodiment of benevolence, pacified evil tendencies.

— Svayambhūstotra (16-1-76)

=== Literature ===
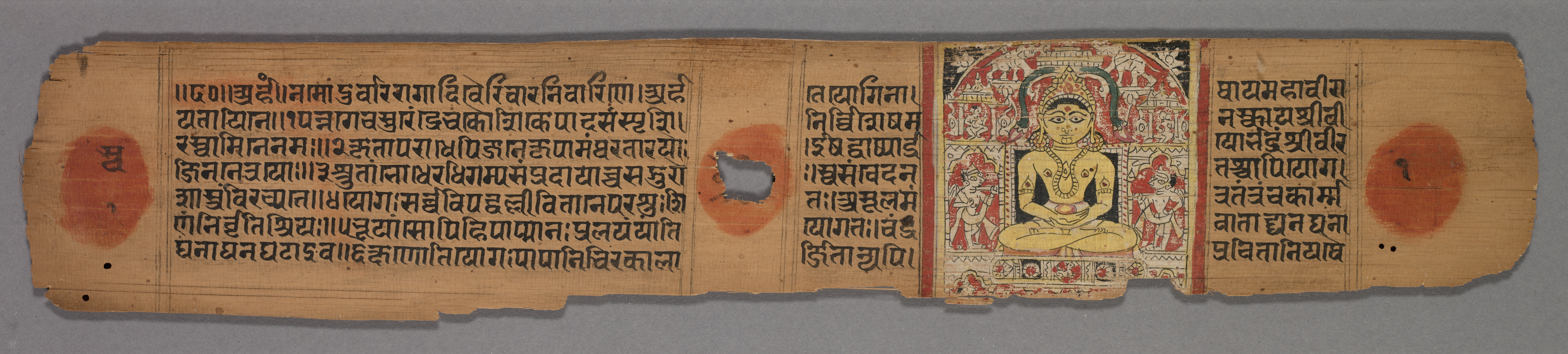
Image of Shantinath on a leaf from Yogaśāstra, 12th century

The Shantinatha Charitra, by Acharya Ajitprabhasuri in 14th century, describes the life of the 16th Jain Tirthankara Shantinatha. This text is the oldest example of miniature painting and has been declared as a global treasure by UNESCO. * Santyastaka is a hymn in praise of Śāntinātha composed by Acharya Pujyapada in the fifth century. Acharya Hemachandra's Trishashti-Shalakapurush-Charitra describes the previous births as well as the final birth of Shantinatha in detail as per the Śvetāmbara tradition. Shantipurana, written around the 10th century by Sri Ponna, is considered to be one of the three gems of Kannada literature.

Ajitasanti or Ajita-Śhānti-stava composed by Acharya Nandisenasuri, a seventh century Jain monk, a famous Śvetāmbara hymn, has alternate verses praising Ajitnatha and Shantinatha. Mahapurusha Charitra, compiled by Merutunga in the 13th—14th centuries, talks about Shantinatha. Santikara was compiled by Munisundarasuri in the 15th century.

=== Iconography ===
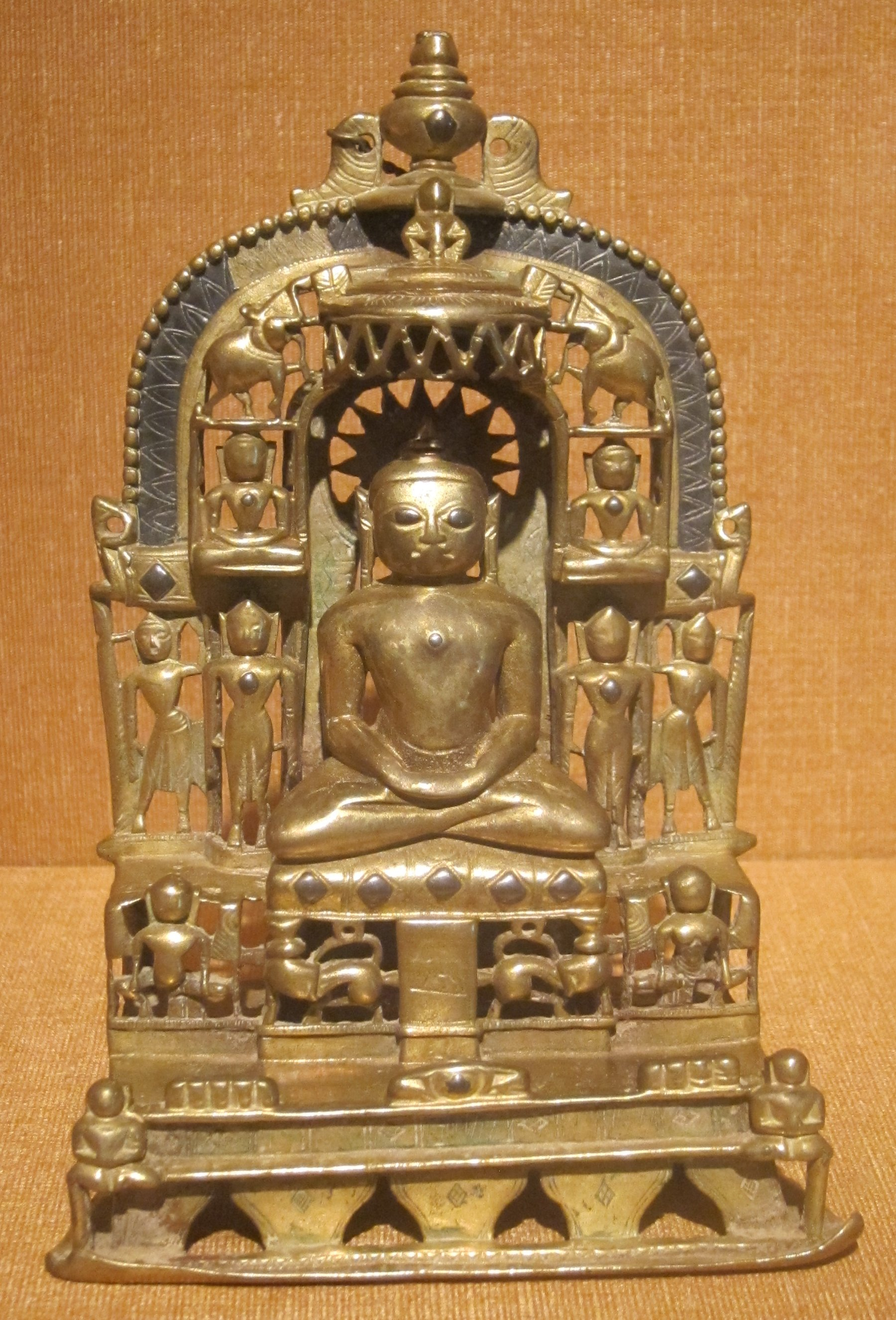
Honolulu Academy of Arts, 15th century

Shantinatha is usually depicted in a sitting or standing meditative posture with the symbol of a deer or antelope beneath him. Every tīrthankara has a distinguishing emblem that allows worshippers to distinguish similar-looking idols of the tirthankaras. The deer or antelope emblem of Shantinath is usually carved below the legs of the tirthankara. Like all tirthankaras, Shantinath is depicted with Shrivatsa (Note: A special symbol that marks the chest of a Tirthankara. The yoga pose is very common in Buddhism, Hinduism, and Jainism. Each tradition has had a distinctive auspicious chest mark that allows devotees to identify a meditating statue as a symbolic icon for their theology. There are several srivasta found in ancient and medieval Jain artworks, and these are not found on Buddhist or Hindu art works.) and downcast eyes.

=== Ancient artifacts and idols ===
Archaeological evidence of Shantinatha's veneration was recovered from the Akota Bronzes in Gujarat. Documented extensively by scholar Umakant Premanand Shah, this excavation yielded a rare bronze idol depicting Shantinatha in the Jivantasvami style. This artifact provides crucial physical evidence of his medieval worship and the advanced metallurgical casting techniques of the post-Gupta era.

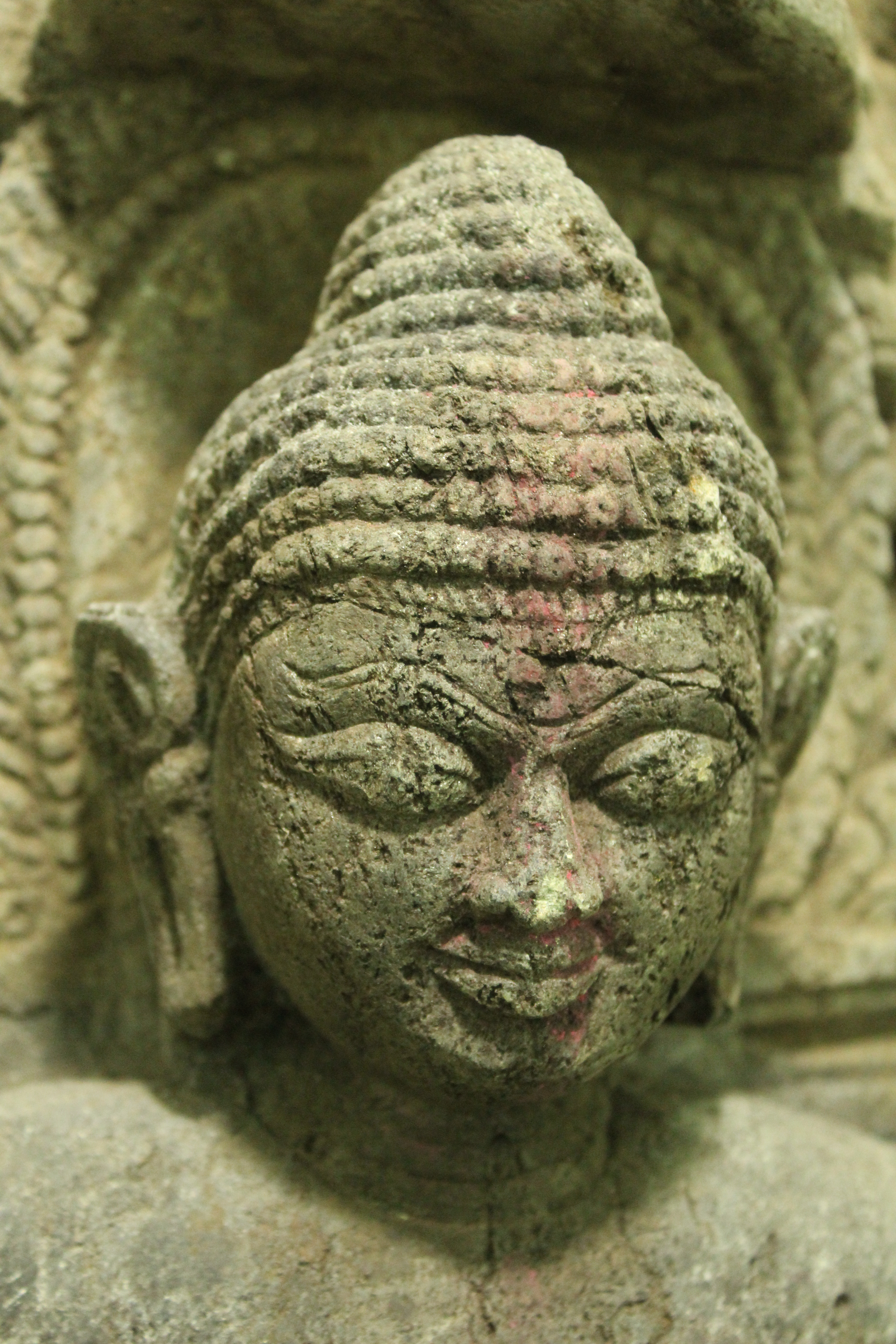
Shantinatha idol inside Pakbirra Jain temple

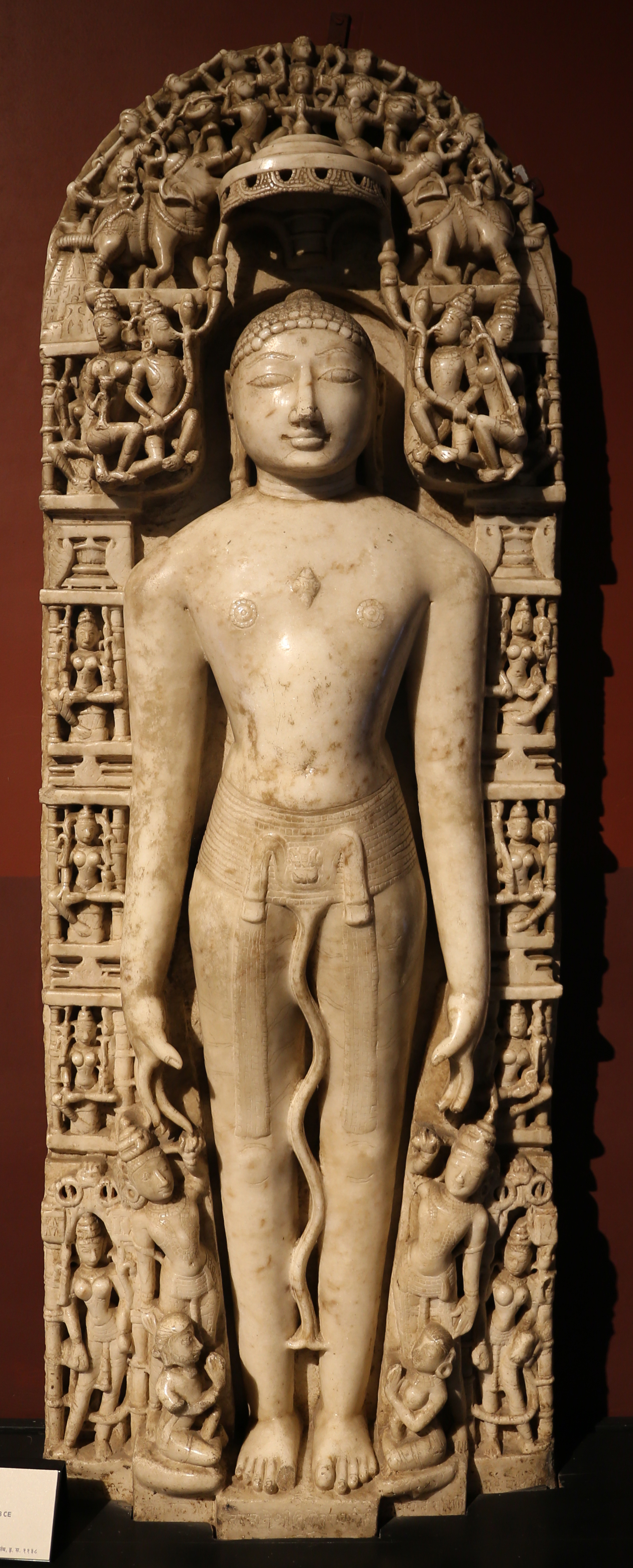
Chhatrapati Shivaji Maharaj Vastu Sangrahalaya, 12th century

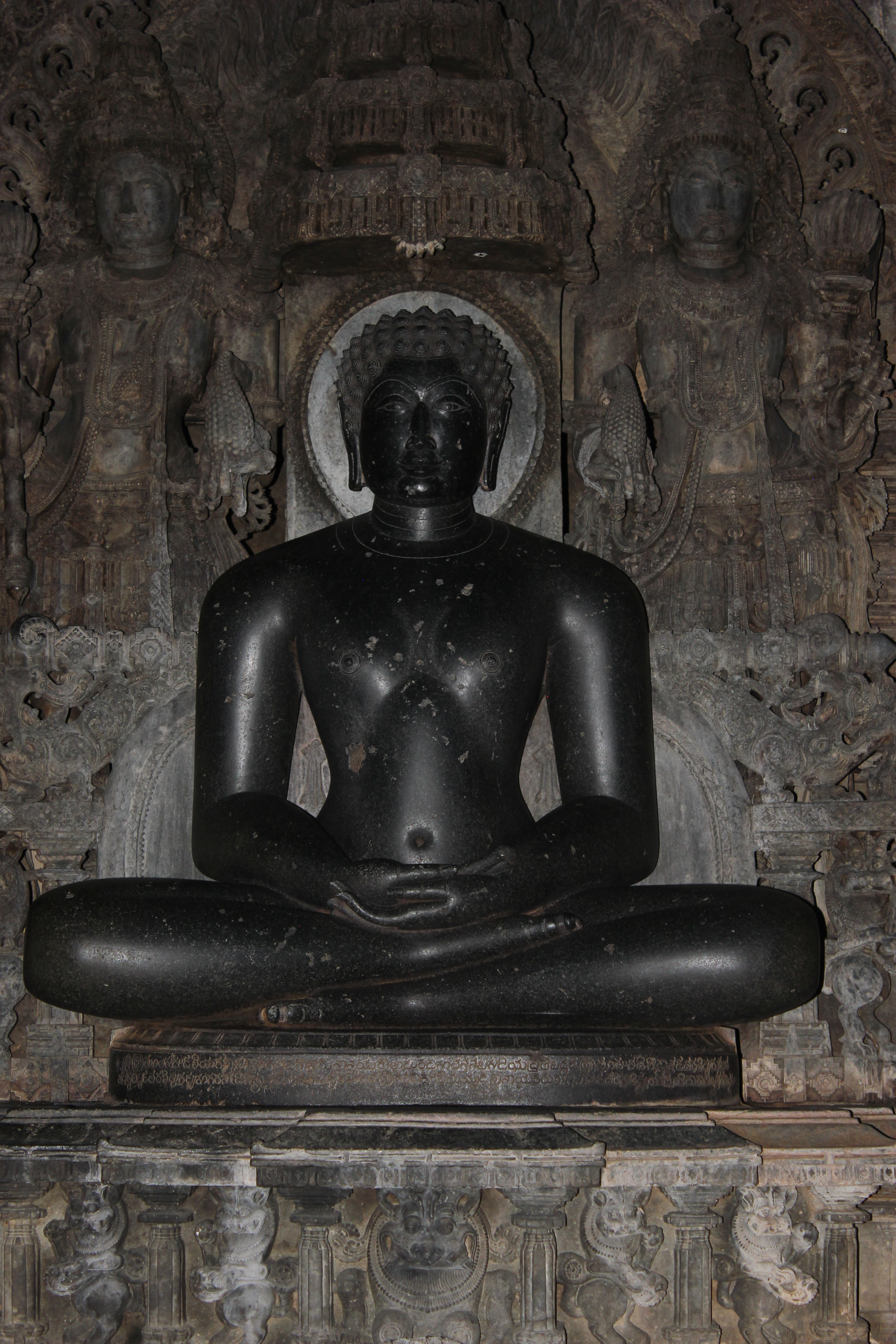
Shantinatha Basadi, Jinanathapura, 1117 CE

=== Colossal statues ===
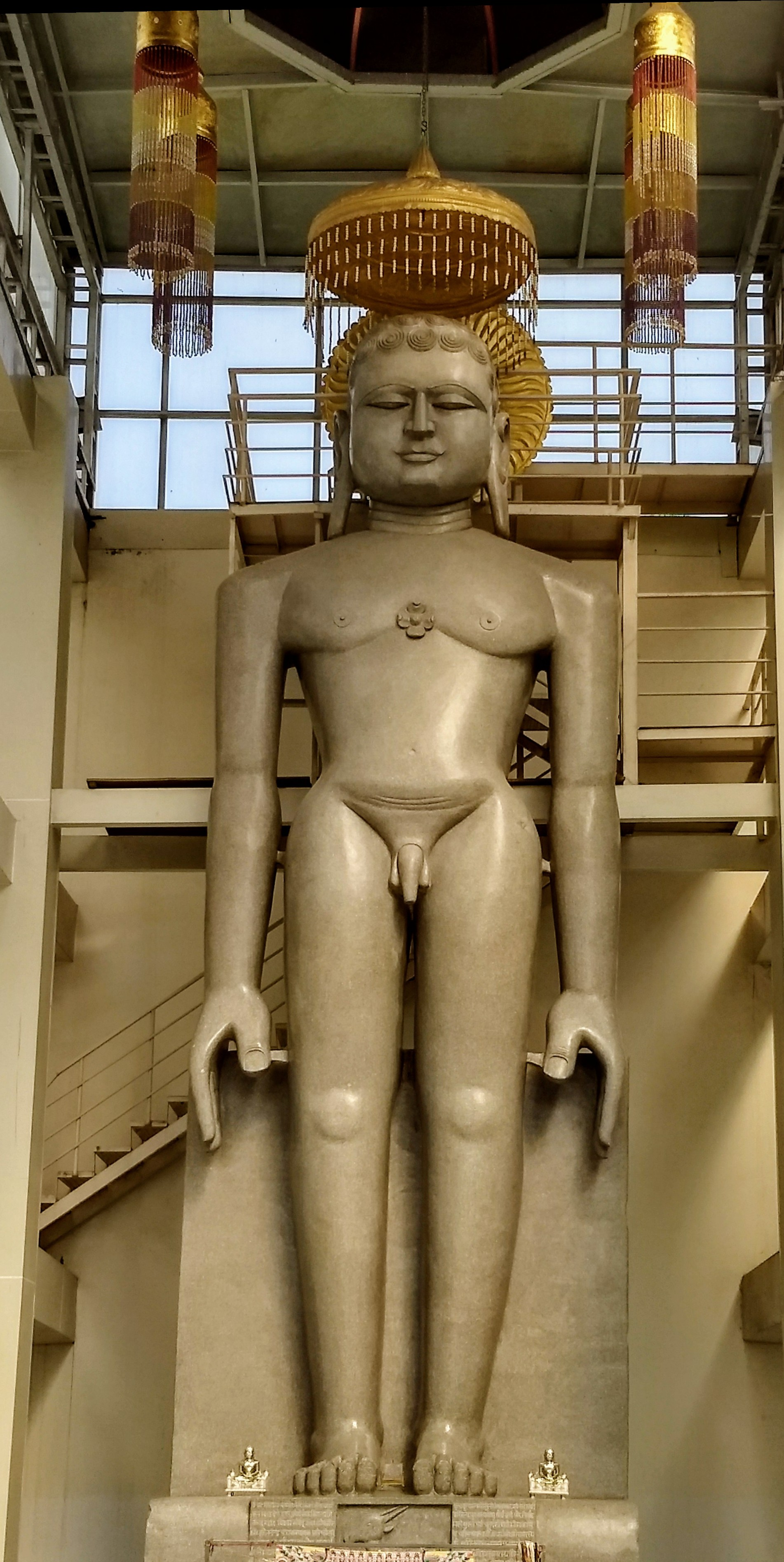
32 feet (9.8 m) colossal at Digamber Jain Bada Mandir Hastinapur

In 2016, the tallest statue of Shantinatha, with a height of 54 feet (16 m), was erected in Ajmer. The 32-foot (9.8 m) statue of Shantinath at Prachin Bada Mandir, Hastinapur and Shantinath Jinalaya, Shri Mahavirji. Aggalayya Gutta in Warangal has a 30-foot (9.1 m) image carved in 11th century CE. The 22.5-foot (6.9 m) statue of Shantinath at Bhojpur Jain Temple.

Aharji enshrines a 22-foot (6.7 m) idol installed in 1180 CE. Shantinatha basadi, Halebidu houses a 18 feet (5.5 m) idol. Naugaza Digambar Jain temple in Alwar has 17.5-foot (5.3 m) colossi dated 922 CE. The 15-foot (4.6 m) image at Shantinatha temple, Khajuraho and Shantinath Basadi, Chandragiri. The 12.5-foot (3.8 m) statue in Bahuriband and Pawagiri, built in the 12th century. Aggalayya Gutta is a historic Jain site situated on a hillock in Hanamkonda that feature 30-foot (9.1 m) image of Shantinatha.

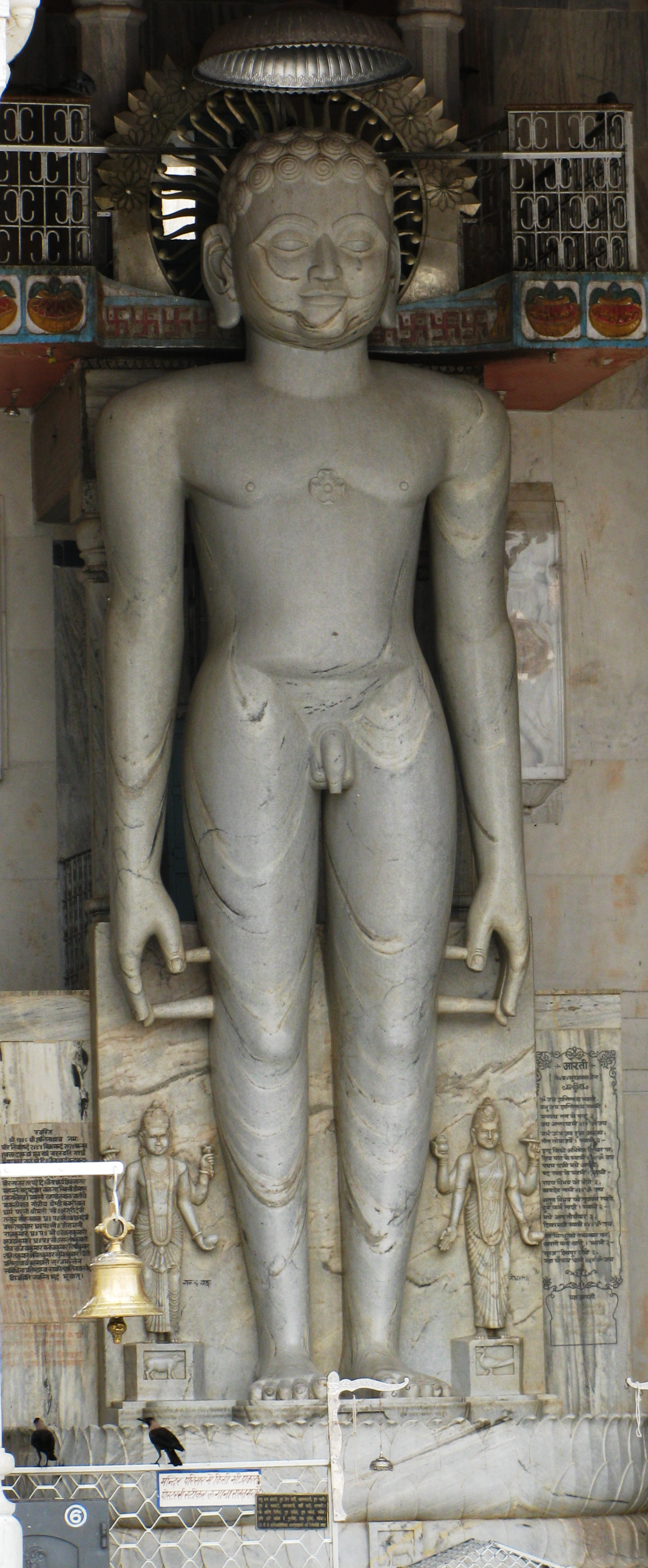
32 feet (9.8 m) colossal at Shantinath Jinalaya, Shri Mahavirji

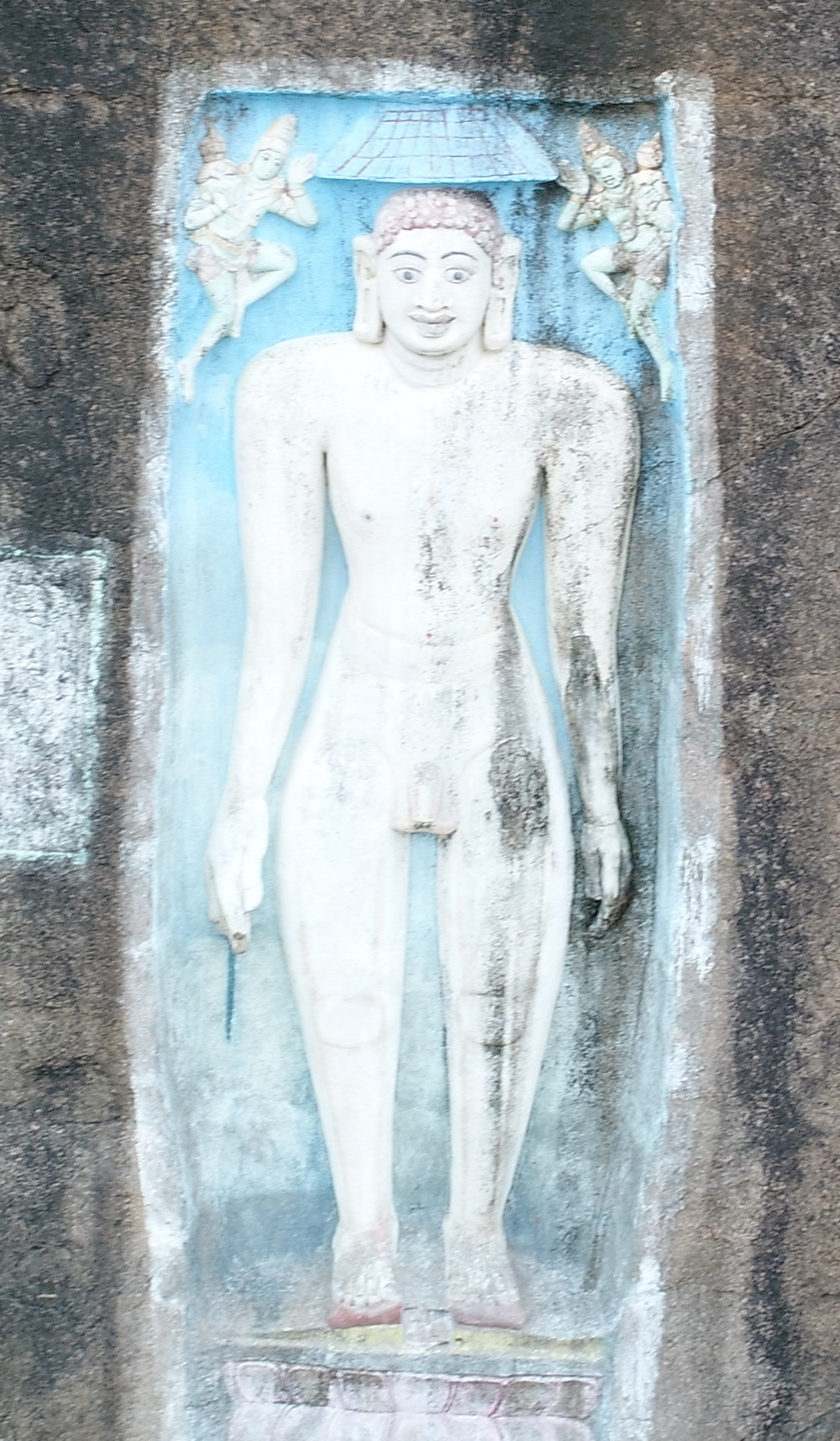
30-foot (9.1 m) rock carved image at Aggalayya Gutta in Warangal

30 feet (9.1 m) statue at Bhojpur Jain Temple

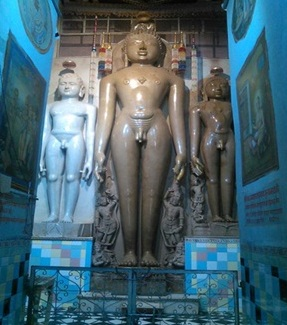
22 feet (6.7 m) Aharji Shantinatha statue installed in 1180 CE.

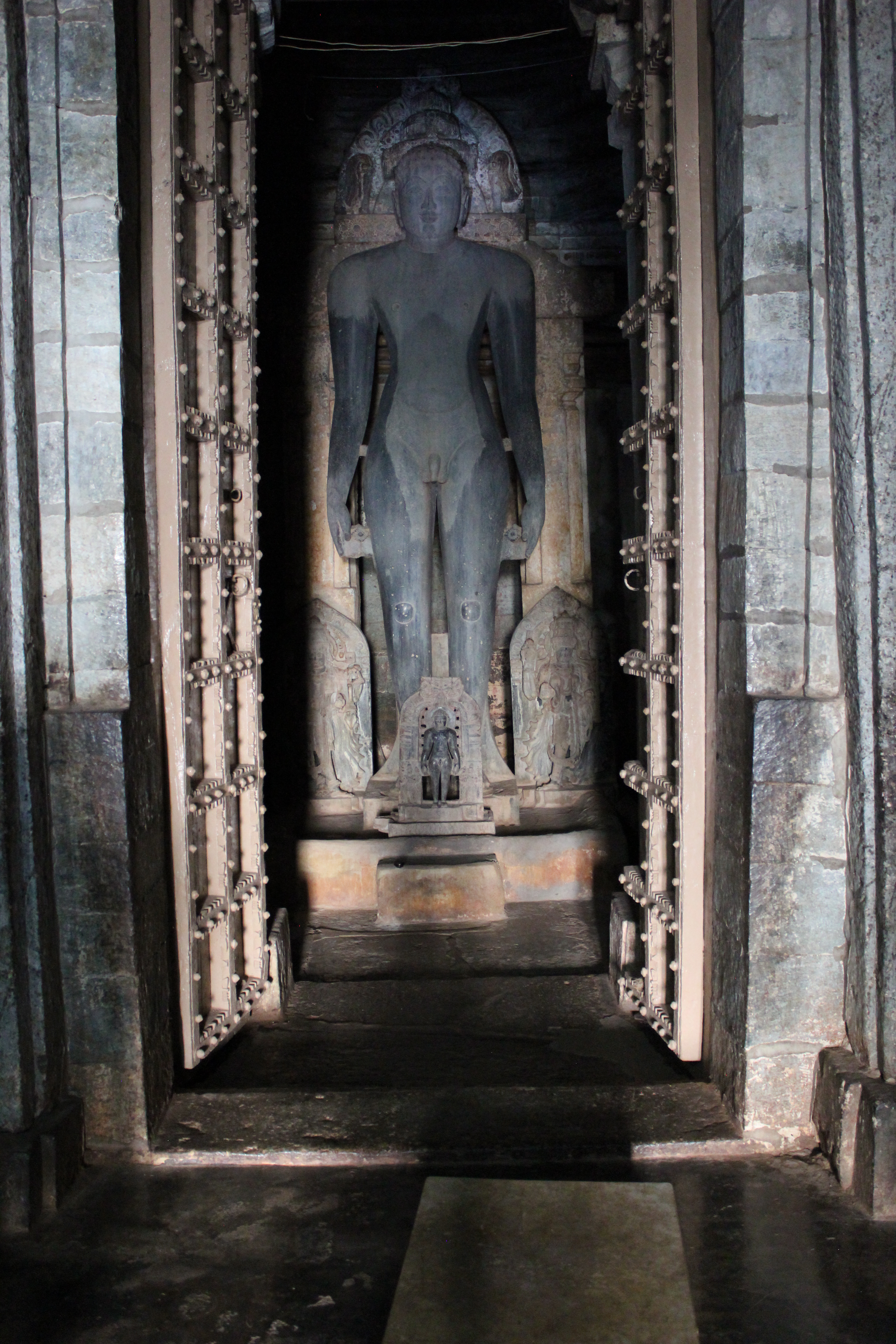
18 feet (5.5 m) Shantinatha basadi, Halebidu

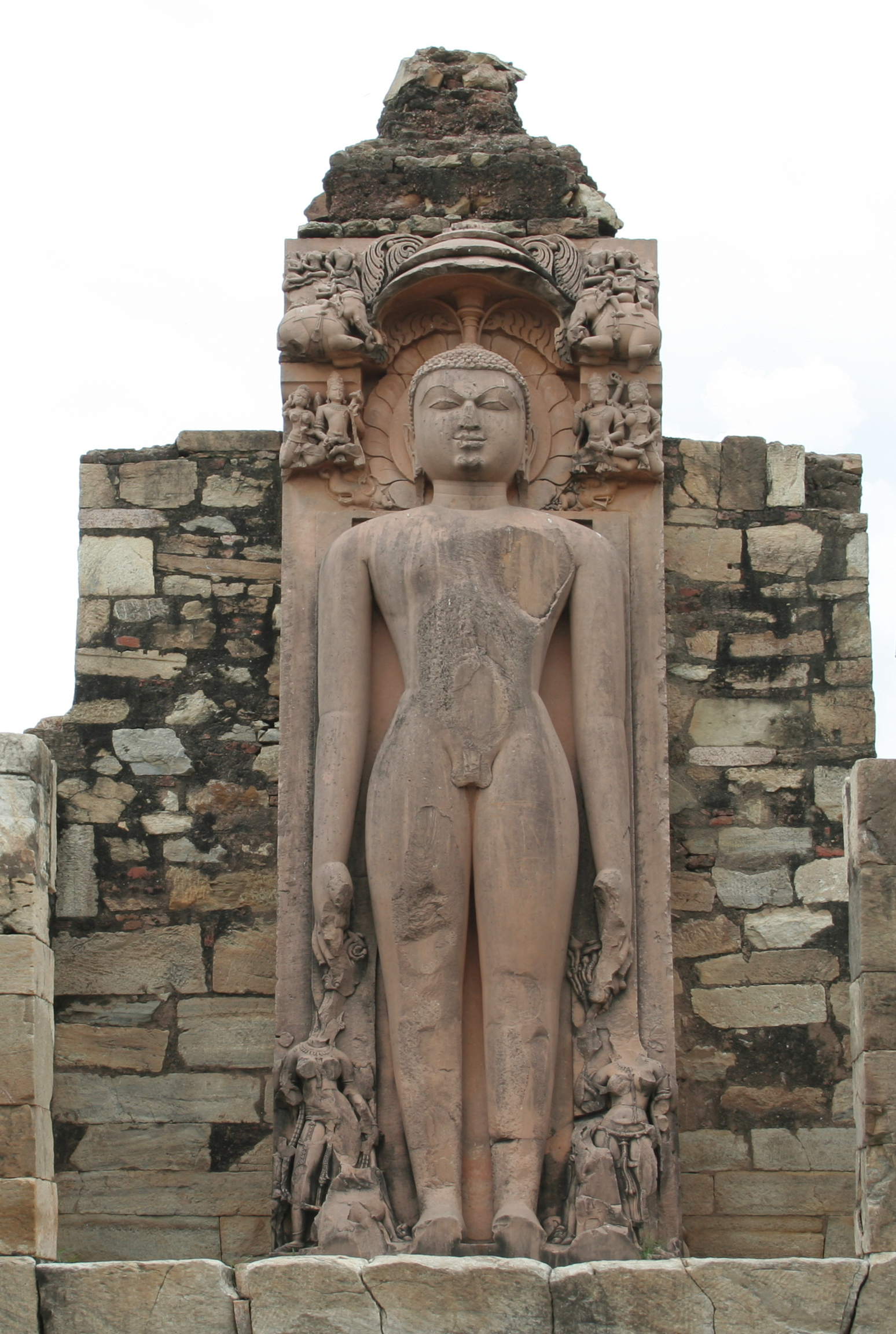
Naugaza Digambar Jain temple, 923 CE

== Temples ==
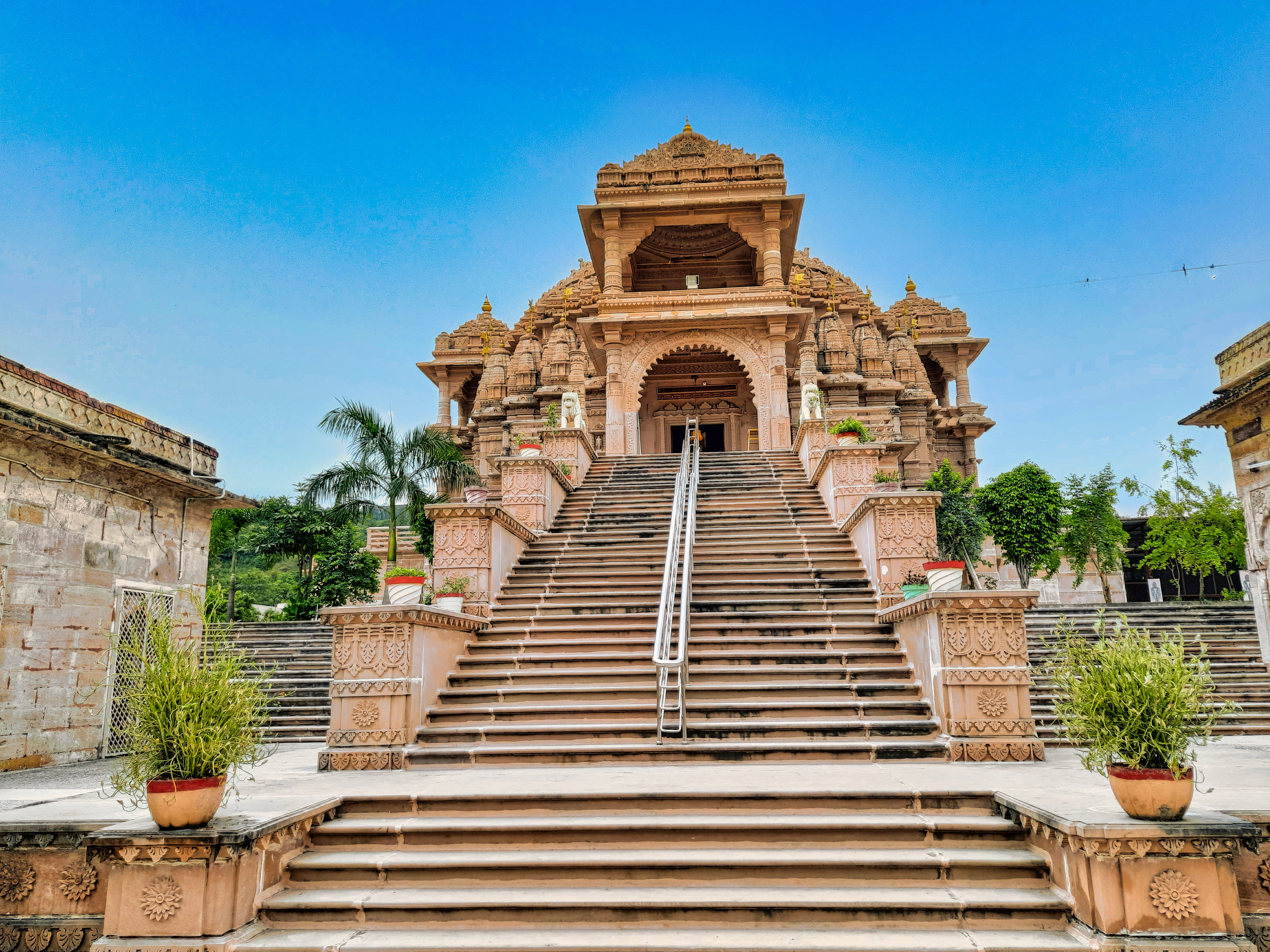
Ramtek Jain temple, Maharashtra

Shantinatha is one of the five most devotionally revered tirthankaras in Jainism, alongside Rishabhanatha, Neminatha, Pārśvanātha, and Mahavira. Consequently, numerous temple complexes across India and within the Jain diaspora are dedicated to him.

=== Places of birth and liberation ===
In northern and central India, Hastinapur in Uttar Pradesh is venerated as the traditional birthplace of Shantinatha, as well as the tirthankaras Kunthunatha and Aranatha. The Digamber Jain Bada Mandir Hastinapur is a major pilgrimage site commemorating this connection.

=== Other temples ===
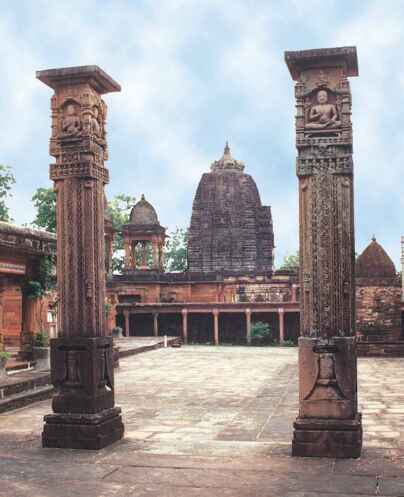
Shantinath Temple, Deogarh, Uttar Pradesh

In Madhya Pradesh, the 11th-century Shantinatha temple, Khajuraho (a UNESCO World Heritage Site) was constructed during the Chandela dynasty and features a 14 feet (4.3 m) standing idol of the deity. The Shantinath Temple, Deogarh in Uttar Pradesh includes a prominent Shantinatha temple dating back to the 9th–10th century Pratihara period. Other notable central Indian sites include the 12th-century Aharji Jain Teerth, the Śvētāmbara tirths of Semliya and Bhopawar, the Ramtek temple, and Beenaji. In Indore, the Kanch Mandir, constructed in the early 20th century by Seth Hukumchand, features an interior entirely decorated with glass and mirrors and serves as a shrine to Shantinatha.

In southern India, the Hoysala empire patronized several major Shantinatha shrines in Karnataka. The Shantinatha temple, Halebidu was constructed in 1192 CE using soapstone and is noted for its lathe-turned pillars. The Shantinatha Basadi, Jinanathapura, built around 1200 CE, is another prime example of Hoysala architecture. The 14th-century Odegal basadi on Vindhyagiri Hill in Shravanabelagola features a triple-shrine (trikuta) layout that includes Shantinatha alongside Neminatha and Rishabhanatha.

In western India, the Shantinath Jain temple, Kothara, Gujarat, is a major architectural site completed in 1861. Further veneration sites include the Pawagiri Jain temple and the Ladnu Jain temple in Rajasthan and Shantinath Jain Teerth in Pune, Maharashtra. Internationally, the Jain Centre in Leicester, United Kingdom, which serves as a central hub for the Jain diaspora in Europe, features a primary shrine dedicated to Shantinatha.

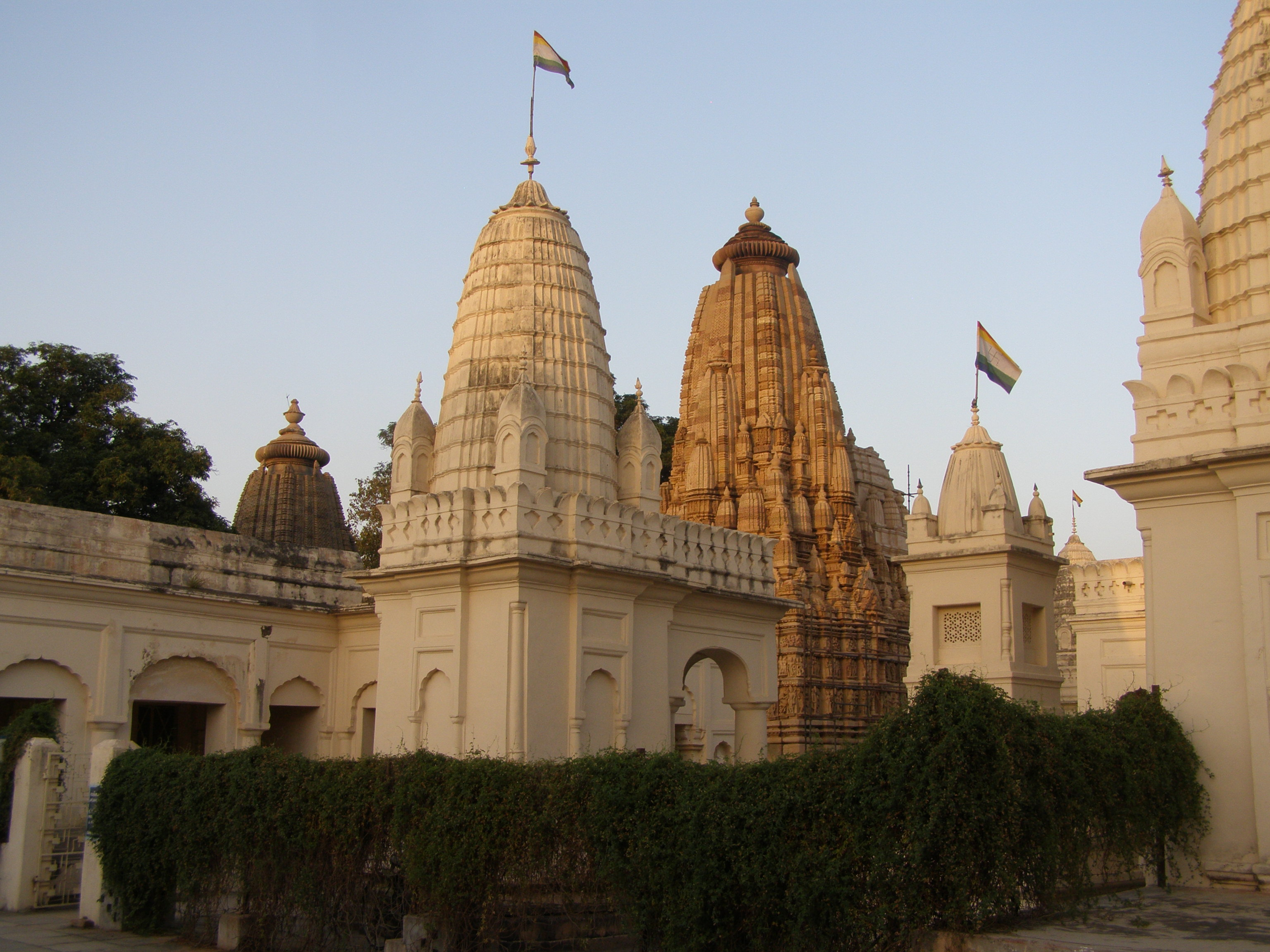
Shantinatha temple, Khajuraho

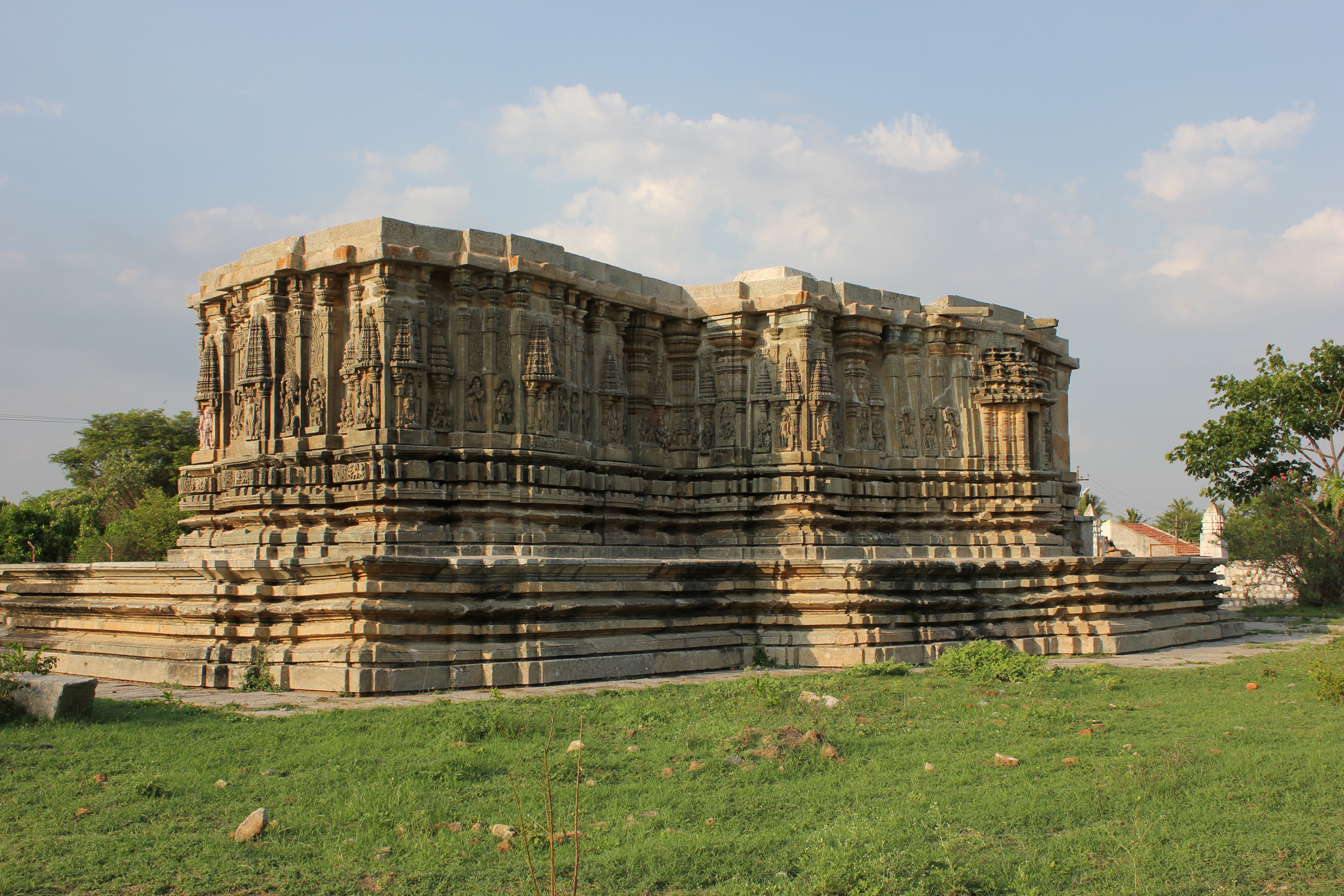
Shantinatha Basadi, Jinanathapura

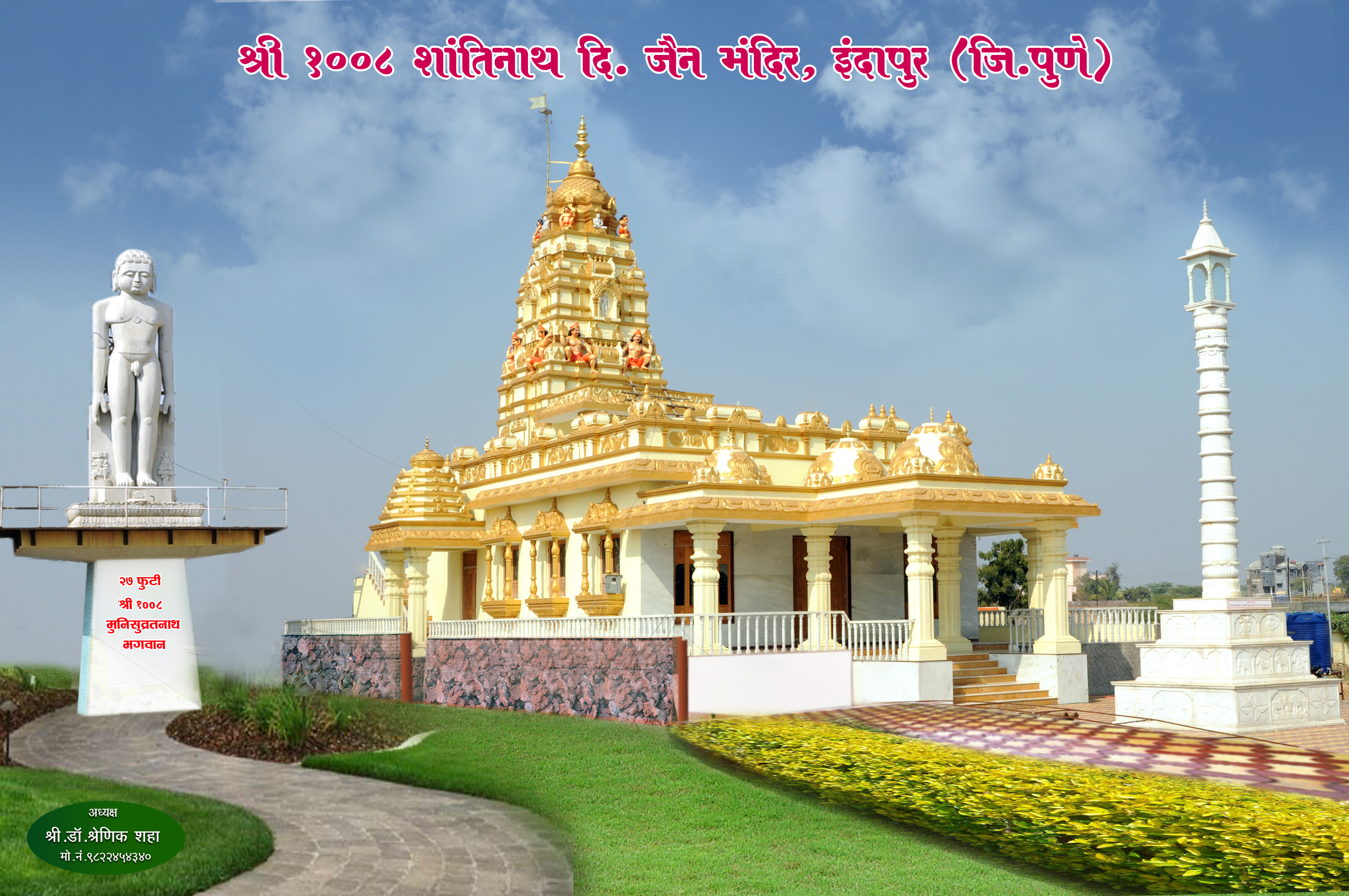
Shantinath Jain Teerth

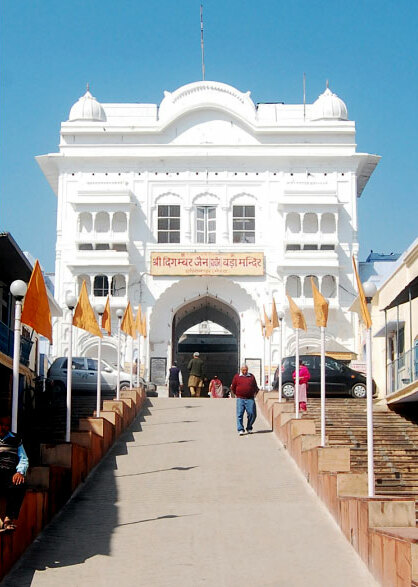
'Singh Dwaar' of Prachin Bada Mandir, Hastinapur

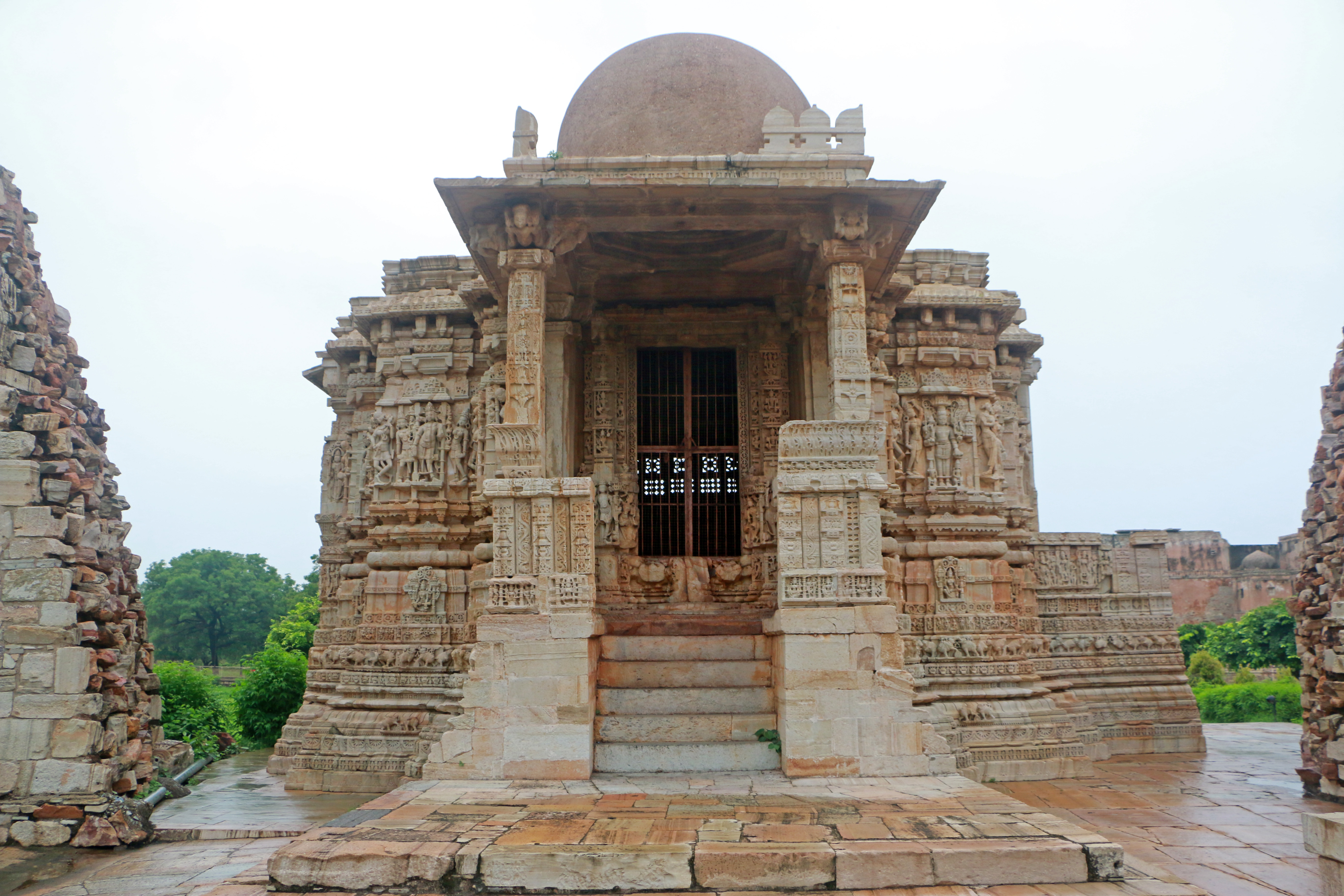
Shringar Chori, Chittor Fort

== See also ==
- God in Jainism
- Jainism and non-creationism
