= Aharji Jain Teerth =

Aharji Tirtha
- अहारजी (Hindi); Aharji Siddha Kshetra, Tikamgarh
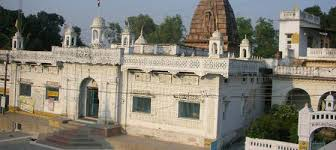
- Aharji Tirtha

Religion
- Affiliation: Jainism
- Deity: Shantinatha
- Festival: Mahavir Jayanti
- Governing body: Shri Digamber Jain Siddha Kshetra Aharji

Location
- Location: Aharji, Tikamgarh district, Madhya Pradesh, India
- Interactive map of Aharji Tirtha
- Coordinates: 24°44′21.8″N 78°59′26.5″E

Architecture
- Style: Chandela architecture
- Established: 10th-12th Century
- Temple: 8

Website
- www.jainteerth.com/teerth/aaharji.asp

Aharji Jain Teerth is a historical pilgrimage site for Jainism located in Aharji, Madhya Pradesh, on the road from Tikamgarh to Chhatarpur.

== Aharji Jain Teerth ==
Aharji group of temples were built during Chandella period. The main temple is famous for the beautiful colossal monumental image of Lord Shatinath from the. Bahubali temple is another important temple in the area. Aharji was a major Jain centre during the Chandella period. The archaeological importance of Ahar is also recognised by the Government of Madhya Pradesh, which describes the settlement as a former important Jain centre containing several ruins, old images and temples. The government survey records three old Jain temples at Ahar, one of which contains a monumental image of Shantinatha approximately 20 feet (6.1 m) high. There is an inscription dated 1049 CE inscribed on bronze idols of Shantinath, Aranatha and Kunthunath. It was the last major temple to be built here in the Chandella period. Several other smaller temples were built here at the same time as the main temple.

Aharji Jain Teerth is famous for the miraculous 22 feet (6.7 m) monolithic idol of Shantinath in Kayotsarga posture. The idol bears an inscription dated to 1180 CE (V.S. 1237).

Over 300 Jain images were found during excavation that were installed here from 954 CE to 1275 CE (VS 1011 to V.S. 1332), spanning the reigns of six Chandella rulers. The inscriptions give the names of 32 separate Jain communities that had built these temples, including Golapurva, Parwar, Khandelwal, Golalare, Jaiswal, etc.

The main temple is surrounded by several shrines and a museum.

== Shantinath image inscription ==
The Shantinath image has a long inscription on it that mentions that two brothers, Jahad and Udaichandra, belonging to the Grahapati community, built the temple during the rule of Chandella ruler Paramardhi, who is well known as Raja Parmal in the popular ballad Alha-Khand. They were the descendants of the builders of the Sahasrakuta temple at Banpur, Lalitpur. The image was carved by a sculptor named Papat Trivedi. mentions that several Chandella inscriptions mentioning the Grahapati individuals have been found and that they were noted for their significance and donations.

ओं नमो वीतरागाय॥ ग्रहपतिवंषसरोरुहसहस्त्ररष्मिः सहस्त्रकूटैर्यः। वाणसुरे व्यधितासीत् श्रीमानिह देवपाल इति॥ 1॥ श्री रत्नपाल इति तत्तनयो वरेण्यः पुण्यैकमूर्तिरभवद्वसुहाटिकायां। कीर्तिर्जगत्रय परिभ्रमणश्रमात्र्ता यस्य स्थिराजनि जिनायतनच्छले न॥ 2॥ एकस्तावदनूनबुद्धिनिधिना श्री शांतिचैत्याल। यो दिष्टयानंदपुरे परः परतरानंदप्रदः श्रीमता। येन श्रीमदनेषसागरपुरे तज्जन्मनो निम्र्मिमे॥ सोअयं श्रेष्ठिवरिश्ठगल्हण ईति श्रीरल्हणाख्याद। भूत्॥ 3॥ तस्मादजायत कुलाम्बरपूर्णचंद्रः श्रीजाहडस्तदनुजोयद चन्द्रनामा॥ एकः परापकृतिहेतुकृतावतारो धम्र्मात्मकः पुनरमो घसुदानसारः॥ 4॥ ताभ्यामषेषदुरितौघषमैकहेतुं निर्मापितं भुवनभूशणभूतमेतद्॥ श्रीषांतिचैत्यमतिनित्यसुखप्रदा तृ मुक्तिश्रियो वदनवीक्षणलोलुपाभ्याम्॥ 5॥ संवत् 1237 मार्ग सुदी 3 शुक्रे श्रीमत्परमर्द्धिदेवविजयराज्ये। चंद्रभास्करसमुद्रतारका यावदत्र जनचित्तहारकः॥ धम्र्मकारिकृतषुद्धकीर्तनं तावदेव जयतात् सुकीत्र्तनम्॥ 6॥ वाल्हणस्य सुतः श्रीमान् रुपकारो महामतिः॥ पापटो वास्तुषास्त्रज्ञस्तेन बिम्ब सुनिर्मितम्॥ 7॥

— An Aharji Inscription 12th century CE

== Gallery ==
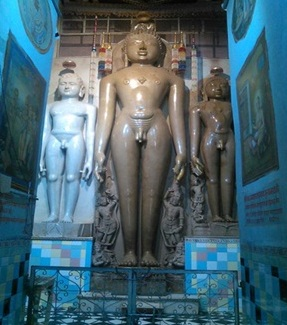
The 22 feet (6.7 m) Idol of Shantinatha

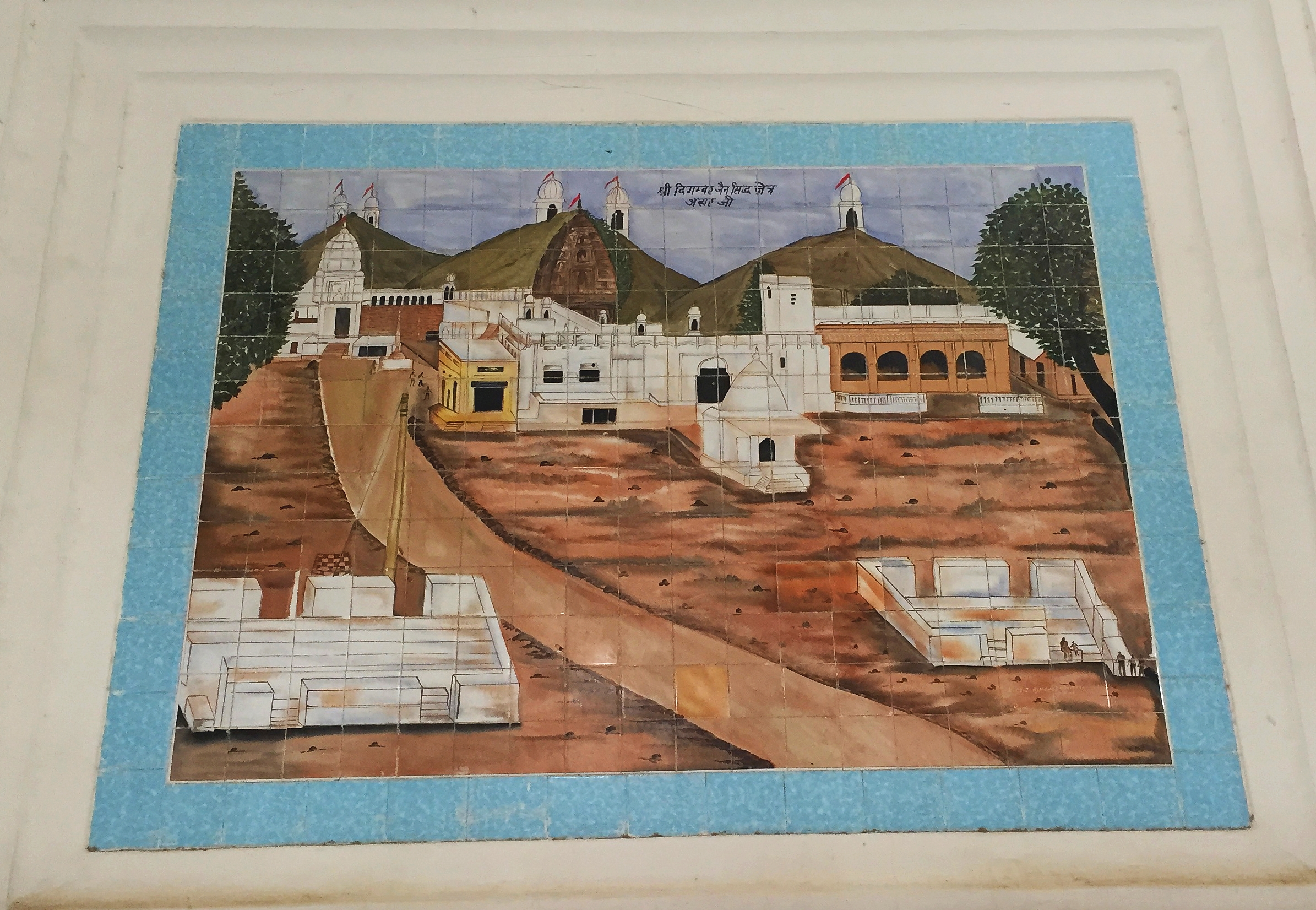
Aharji Mural at Nainagiri

== Location ==
The place is located in Taluka – Baldeogarh, District – Tikamgarh, Madhya Pradesh, about 25 km from Tikamgarh. The management committee is Shri Digamber Jain Siddha Kshetra Aharji Prabandhakarini Samiti, Nearby Cities include Tikamgarh and Chhatarpur

== See also ==
- Alha-Khand
- Grahapati Kokkala inscription
- Jain temples of Khajuraho
- Jainism in Bundelkhand
- Tirtha
