= Aharji =

Aharji Aharji Kshetra
- city
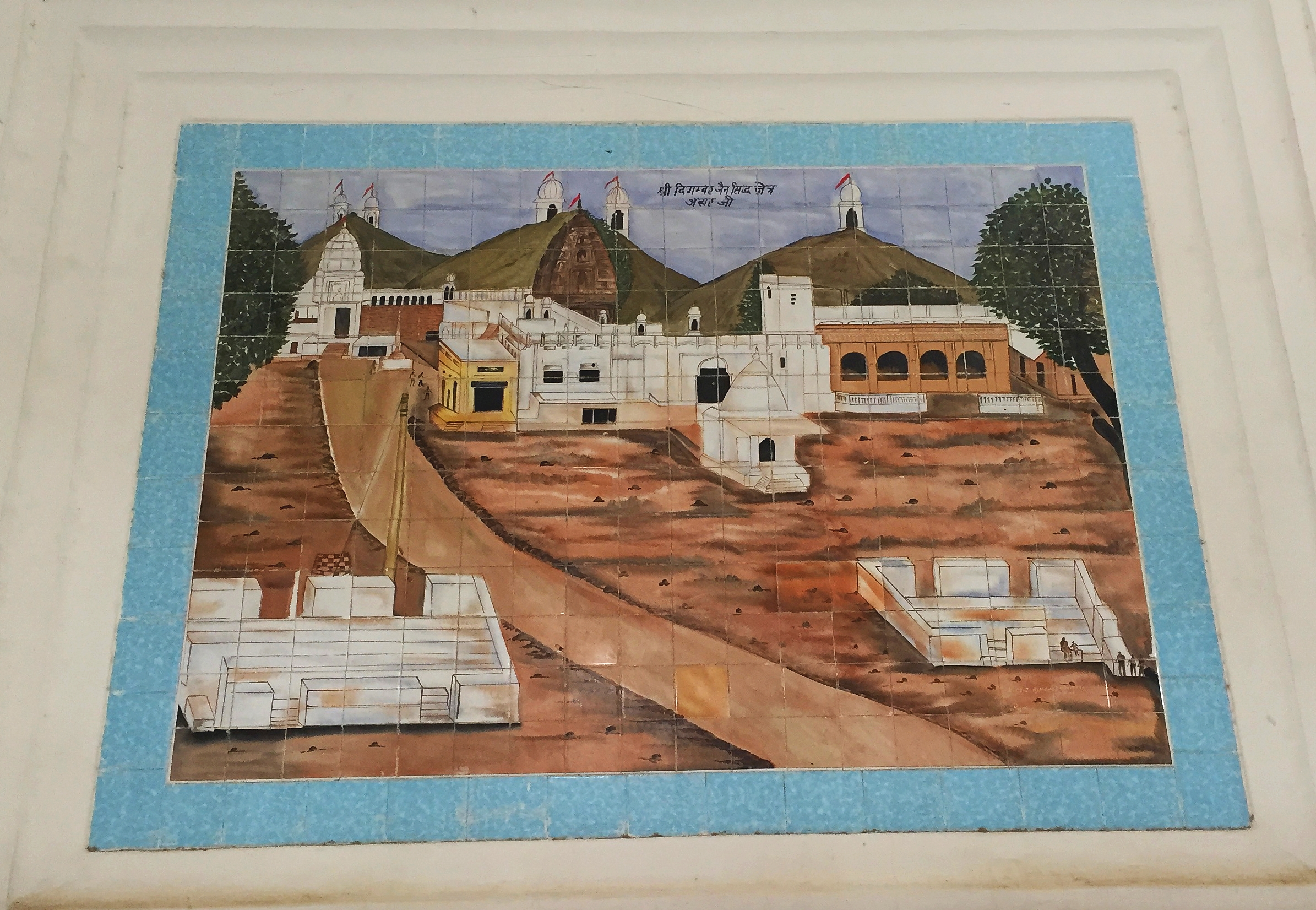
- Aharji Mural at Nainagiri Samosharana

- Location in Madhya Pradesh, India
- Coordinates: 24.75°N 79.14°E
- Country: India
- State: Madhya Pradesh
- District: Tikamgarh
- Elevation: 305 m (1,001 ft)

Languages
  - Official: Hindi
- Time zone: UTC+5:30 (IST)

Aharji is a historical pilgrimage site for Jainism in India. It is located in the central Indian state of Madhya Pradesh, on the road from Tikamgarh to Chhatarpur. This place is famous for Jain Temple.

== Aharji Jain Teerth ==
Aharji is a place full of natural attractive beauty. It is famous for the miraculous colossus of Lord (Shantinath) in standing (Khadagasana) posture. It is 18 feet in height.

The main temple is famous for beautiful monumental image of Lord Shatinath from the Chandella period. It has an inscription on it of 1180 AD (Vikram Samvat 1237). It was the last major temple to be built here in the Chandella period. Several other smaller temples were built here at the same time as the main temple.

Excavations have found a large number of Jain images that were installed here during 954 to 1275 AD (Samvat 1011 to Samvat 1332), spanning the reigns of six Chandella rulers. This was a major Jain center during the Chandella period. The inscriptions give the names of 32 separate Jain communities that had built these temples, including Golapurva, Parwar, Khandelwal, Golalare, Jaiswal etc.

Shantinath image inscription

The Shantinath image has a long inscription on it that mentions that two brothers, Jahad and Udaichandra, belonging to the Grahapati community, built the temple during the rule of Chandella ruler Paramardhi, who is well known as Raja Parmal in the popular ballad Alha-Khand. They were the descendants of the builders of the Sahasrakuta temple at Banpur. The image was carved by a sculptor name Papat. Trivedi mentions that several Chandella inscriptions mentioning the Grahapati individuals have been found, and that they were noted for their significance and donations.

== Location ==
The place is located in Taluka – Baldeogarh, District – Tikamgarh, Madhya Pradesh, about 25 km from Tikamgarh. The management committee is Shri Digamber Jain Siddha Kshetra Aharji Prabandhakarini Samiti, Nearby Cities include Tikamgarh and Chhatarpur

== See also ==
- Alha-Khand
- Grahapati Kokkala inscription
- Jain temples of Khajuraho
- Jainism in Bundelkhand
- Nainagiri
- Navagarh
- Tirtha
