= Parwar (Jain community) =

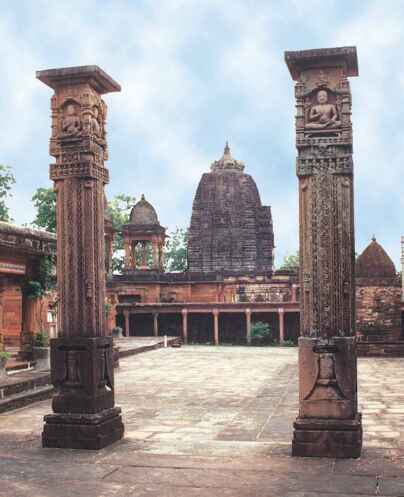
Shantinath Temple, one of the Jain temples of Deogarh in Uttar Pradesh

Parwar, or Paravāra (Hindi: परवार, Sanskrit: 𑀧𑁅𑀭𑀧𑀝𑁆𑀝, romanized: Paravāra) is a major Jain community in Bundelkhand, which is an area of central North India largely in Madhya Pradesh, but also includes the two districts of Lalitpur and Jhansi in Uttar Pradesh. Apart from these, Nagpur district of Maharashtra also has a very large Parwar community. There is an area in Itwari of Nagpur known as Parwarpura that has a large number of Parwari homes and shops. Most Nagpuri Parwaris have migrated from Sagar, Deori, and other small villages of the Sagar district of Madhya Pradesh. Parwar exclusively follow the Digambara movement.

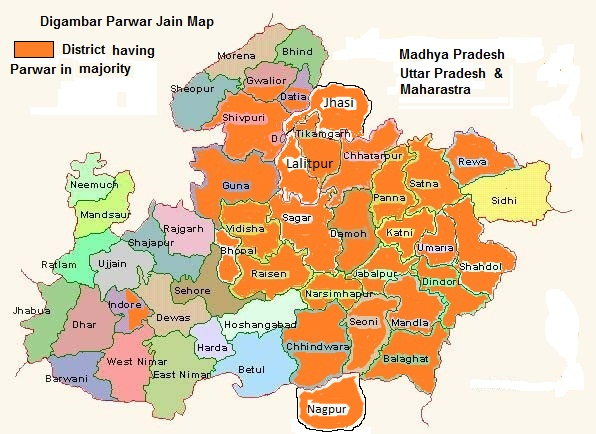
Map of districts having a large Parwar communities

Traditionally, the Parwars have practiced endogamy. There are twelve gotras in the community and each has twelve moor "lineages". A marriage within the same gotra or lineage is not allowed. Traditionally, a marriage within any of the eight branches (the moor of a boy or girl, mother's family, father's mother's family, etc) was not permitted, and ttus the community was termed ashtashakha.

A number of Jain scholars have belonged to this community, including Taran Svami, the founder of Taran Panth and the Bhattarakas of Chanderi. Rajneesh, the founder of the notorious new religious movement called the Rajneesh movement, was born in the Samaiya section of this community.

Sumerchand Diwakar, Nathuram Premi, Hiralal Jain, Mahendrakumar Nyayacarya, Phulacandra Shastri, Hiralal Jain, Balacandra Shastri, Jaganmohanlal Shastri, Devakinandan Nayak, Swami Satyabhakta (1899–1998), and many other illustrious scholars of Jainism were born in the Parwar community.

== History ==
A number of inscriptions mentioning the community have been found in the region adjacent to the Betwa river, which flows on the border of MP and UP. In the older inscriptions they are called Paurapatta or Puravada. The oldest inscriptions include those found at Vidisha (948 CE), Pachrai (1065 CE), Aharji (1152, 1153), Chanderi (VS 1252,13450), Sironj (VS 1299, 1316), Narwar (VS 1319). A long inscription at Deogarh of VS 1493 mentions Lakshaman Singhai and his large family, who installed an image of the tīrthaṅkara Shantinatha under the supervision of Bhattaraka Devendrakirti of Balatkara Gana. It is probably the first mention of the Singhai or Sanghapati title in the region.

Some authors have proposed a historic connection between the Parwar and the Porwal communities.

Jainism has had a continuous presence in this region since antiquity. Jainism flourished during the Gupta Empire in the Vidisha district. The Durjanpur idols installed during the rule of Ramagupta date to about 365. The Udaigiri cave Pārśvanātha inscription mentioning the lineage of Bhadranvaya is dated to 425. The great Shantinath temple at Deogarh was built before 862 CE, suggesting a prosperous Jain community in this region.

According to the Mahāvaṃsa, Devi, the wife of the Mauryan emperor Ashoka, was a daughter of a merchant of Vidisha, whose son Mahinda took Buddhism to Sri Lanka. It is likely that the Parwar community is a continuation of the ancient merchant community that has existed in the region.

== Organization ==
The Parwars are divided into 12 gotras, each gotra is further divided into 12 shakhas (mura)s. Traditionally 4 of the shakhas of the grandparents of the boy, and four of the shakhas of the grandparents of the girl were required to be distinct for a marriage to take place. Thus the Parwars were sometimes termed ashta-shaha.

There were once several social divisions among the Parwars, which are no longer significant.

Some Parwars follow Taran Panth and are called Samaiya, because Taran Swami based his teachings on Samayasara of Acharya Kundakunda.

Parwar Sabha was founded in 1917 at Ramtek, after the Bundelkhandiya Jain Sabha broke into community groups. In the 1924 convention, it was proposed that only four shakhas be considered for marriage, but the proposal was defeated. A newsletter Parwar Bandhu was published during 1929–1944.

Historical Parwar center

A "Parwar Directory" was published in 1924 which included population data, according to which the Parwar population then was 48,074. The community resided in 1438 towns and villages with largest population in Sagar, Jhansi, Jabalpur, Damoh and Tikamgarh districts. The largest number are in Lalitpur (1122 in 1924), Mungawali (481), Khaniadhana (320), Pachhar (Ashoknagar Isagarh), Mandawara (304), Sivni (358), Sagar (595), Bamora (374), Khurai (503), Bina-Itawa (358), Pindarai (Mandla 314), Jabalpur (1058) and Tikamgarh. This puts the majority of the major centers within a 50-mile radius from Deogarh (see , Map) along the Betwa river in early 20th century.

The main concentration of the Parwars is still in these towns; however, many of them have moved to major industrial cities further away such as Delhi, Mumbai and Bangalore. A few Parwar families have now migrated to America.

== Distinguished Paravāra Jains ==
- Bhattaraka Devendrakirti, founder of Chanderi and Gandhar/Rander seat.
- Pandit Nathuram Premi, Historian, publisher and editor (26 November 1881 – 30 January 1960)
- Osho Rajneesh (1931–1990), Indian godman, mystic and founder of the Rajneesh movement ( he was born in Taranpanth sector, founder of sect Taranswami Himself was Parwar)
- Pandit Balachandra Shastri, Traditional Jain Scholar, best remembered for his work on the Satkhandāgama and the Kasāyapāhuda
- Swami Satyabhakta, Wardha, philosopher, founder of Satya Samaj (1899–1998)
- Singhai Lakshmana, who installed Lord Shantinatha at Deogarh in 1436.

== See also ==
- Chanderi
- Balatkara Gana
- Jainism in Bundelkhand
- Golalare
- Golapurva
- Gahoi
