= Kathanera =

Jain Community

Kathanera (also known as Kathanere) is a small subgroup of Jain community in Northern India. The community was found to have very small numbers but they owned around twelve temples in total.

== See also ==
- Jainism in India
- Jainism in Uttar Pradesh
- Golapurva
- Parwar
