= Bahuriband =

Religion
- Affiliation: Jainism
- Deity: Shantinatha
- Festival: Mahavir Jayanti

Location
- Location: Katni, Madhya Pradesh
- Interactive map of Bahuriband
- Coordinates: 23°40′02.1″N 80°04′01″E

Architecture
- Established: 1125 AD
- Temple: 1

Bahuriband (or Bahoriband), near Katni in Madhya Pradesh, is a famous inscription at the feet of a colossal stone image of Jain Tirthankara Shantinath. The colossal statue is 12 ft 2 in (3.71 m) in height.

== Inscription ==
The inscription reads:

संवत १०..फल्गुन वदि ९ सोमे श्रीमद गयाकर्णदेव विजयराज्ये राष्ट्रकूटकुलोद्भव महासमन्ताधिपति श्रीमद् गोर्ल्हणदेवस्य प्रवर्धमानस्य || श्रीमद् गोल्लापूर्वाम्नाये वेल्लप्रभाटिकायामुरुकृताम्नाये तर्कतार्किक चूडामणि श्रीमन् माधवनन्दिनानुगृहीतः तस्साधु श्री सर्व्वधरः तस्य पुत्र महाभोज धर्म्मदानाध्ययनरतः तेनेदं कारितं रम्यम शान्तिनाथस्य मन्दिरं|| स्वलात्यम् सर्ज्जक सूत्रधारः श्रेश्ठि नमावितानं महाश्वेत.म निर्मितमतिसुन्दरं|| श्रीमच्चन्द्रकराचर्य्याम्नाय देशीगणान्वये समस्त विद्या विनयानन्दित विद्वज्जनाः प्रतिष्ठाचार्य श्रीमत् सुभद्राश्चिरं जयतु ||

The Bahuriband stone inscription from the reign of Kalachuri ruler Gayakarna mentions that one Mahabhoja, son of Sadhu Sarvadhara, from the Golapurva community erected a temple of Shantinath. The image was consecrated by the Acharya Subhadra who belonged to the line of Desiya Gana (a branch of Mula Sangh) in the amnyaya of Candrakara Acharya. The region was ruled by Mahasamanta Golhana Deva of Rashtrakuta clan.

The samvat is not clearly read, Alexander Cunningham estimated it to be Saka era 1020 to 1047 AD. Epigraphist Dr. Suman dates it to Vikram 1182 or 1125 CE. Gayakarna ruled during 1123-1153 CE, thus supporting 1125 CE.

An edict of Ashoka is engraved at a spot named Rupanath nearby.

== See also ==
- Jainism in Bundelkhand
- Rashtrakuta
- Golapurva
- Indian inscriptions
- Devanagari
- Tigawa Gupta period temple
