= Asati =

Asati is a merchant community in Bundelkhand region of Madhya Pradesh, India.

It is said that the Asatis originally hailed from a village near Ayodhya in Uttar Pradesh and later shifted to the area around Damoh in Madhya Pradesh. They subsequently migrated throughout the Bundelkhand region.

== History ==
In some texts the name is given as Asahati or Asaiti, but the community is mainly referred to as Asati.

Navalshah Chanderia, who wrote Vardhamana Purana in 1768 AD at Khataura, included the Asati community among the eleven merchant communities that are partly Jain. Russel and Hiralal in 1916 also mention a minority being Jain. Brahmachari Sitalprasad, in his introduction to an edition of the Mamala Pahuda (Taranpanthi Jain text) wrote that one of his used manuscripts was copied in an Asahati temple in 1624. The Taran Panth is followed by members of six communities in Bundelkhand, Asati being one of them. But note that all Asatis do not follow Jainism, and most of them follow Hinduism.

The community celebrates an annual Asati Diwas, on Sharada Purnima every year.

== Notable figures ==
Ganeshprasad Varni, one of the foundational figures of the modern North-Indian Digambar intellectual tradition during early 20th century was born into an Asati family.

== See also ==
- Gahoi
- Golapurva
