= Balachandra Shastri =

Indian scholar and linguist (1905-1986)

Pandit Balachandra Shastri
- Born: 1905; Sonrai, Bundelkhand, British India
- Died: 1986 (aged 80–81); Hyderabad, Andhra Pradesh
- Occupation(s): Editor, Linguist and Scholar

Pandit Balachandra Siddhanta-Shastri (पंडित बालचंद्र सिद्धान्तशास्त्री) was a scholar and linguist who bridged classical and modern scholarship in Jainism during the mid-20th century.

== Life ==
Born in 1905 at Sonrai, in the district of Sagar in Bundelkhand, Madhya Pradesh, he attended the traditional Jain institution at Sadhumal. He later studied at Kashi Vidyapith. He worked for several Jain institutions in India during his life as a scholar. His efforts resulted in the publication of several major Jain texts. He died in Hyderabad in 1985.

== Contributions ==
His contributions include

- Satkhandagama along with Dhavala: volumes 6–16, translation.
- Tiloyapannatti, vol. 1-2, translation.
- Padmanandi's Panchvinshati, translation and commentary.
- Jain Lakshnavali (Jain Paribhashik Sabdakosh) (An Authentic and Descriptive Dictionary of Jaina Philosophical Terms)1972-1979, editor.
- Dhyansataka Or Dhyanstav of Bhaskarnandi, editing and translation
- Atmanushasana of Gunabhadra, editing and translation.
- Lokavibhaga of Simhasuri, editing and translation.
- Punysarava-kathakosa of Ramachandra, editing and translation.

== See also ==
- Golapurva
- Satkhandagama
- Jainism in Bundelkhand
