= Singhai =

Singhai (also Sanghvi,sangoi, Shanghvi, Shingavi or Singhi from Sanskrit Sanghapati (संघपति), literally chief of the Sangha) is a hereditary title awarded in the past to leaders of the Jain Sangha.

Among the Digambara Jains the title is awarded for building a Jain temple with formal installation (Panch-kalyanak Pratishtha) of Tirthankara images with festivities, often accompanied with a gajrath. Among the Śvetāmbara Jains it is awarded for conducting a mass pilgrimage to major tirthas.

== Bundelkhand titles ==
In most north Indian Jain communities, the honorific "Sah" (Sanskrit Sadhu) has been widely used. It can be used by any Jain.

In Bundelkhand a system of titles, which are inherited, has been in use for several centuries.

=== Award of Singhai ===
A 1437 AD inscription at Deogarh uses the terms Singhai and Sanghadhipati. It mentions a pratishtha conducted by Bhattaraka Devendrakirti of Chanderi. A 1467 AD inscription on a metal image in Bhind uses the term Sanghai for the male members of a family and Sanghaini for two female members. These and other 15th century inscriptions suggest the presence of the title in Bundelkhand.

The tradition of the title Singhai exists in Bundelkhand among the Parvaars, Golapurvas and the Golarare. It also exists in the Bhadawar/Gwalior region among the Kharaua, and Varaiya communities. The terms Sanghavi, Sanghadhip and Sanghapati were used in the time of poet Raighu (1383–1468) for Gwalior Shravakas belonging to Agrawal and Golalare communities.

Navalsah Chanderia has described an elaborate Pratishtha with Gajrath conducted by his ancestors in 1594 at Bhelsi where they were awarded the title of Singhai. The temple built on this occasion still exists in Bhelsi. Vinodilal (about in 1690) his Phulamala Pachchisi mentions that organizing a pratishtha is rewarded by the title Sanghahi.

At the conclusion of the pratishtha function, a turban of chanderi cloth was formally placed on the head of the organizing shraavaka, and people in the congregation ritually saluted him saying "Singhaiji Juhaar".

=== Higher titles ===
In Bundelkhand a ranking of titles had existed in the past. A person who already has the rank Singhai, receives the title "Savaai Singhai" upon another gaja-ratha pratishtha. On a third occasion they receive the title "Seth", and following that the title "Shrimant Seth" is conferred.

Khurai Zamindar Nandlal had conducted gaja-ratha pratishtha on three occasions, 1834, 1839 and 1863 and thus had earned the titles Singhai, Savaai Singhai and Seth. His grandson Mohanlal had conducted pratishtha in 1893 and thus had earned the title Shrimant Seth. Gopal Sao Puran Sao of Seoni was awarded the title for conducting pratishthas in 1849 in Jabalpur and 1877, 1895 and 1902 at Seoni. In Vidisha, in 1933, Sitab Rai Laxmi Chand was given the title Shrimant Seth in Itawa for the funding the publication of Shatkhandagam text. Mathuradas Taraiya of Lalitpur was awarded the title in 1920s. Some of the Khag clan families in Karitoran, Lalitpur hold the title Savaai Seth, which is equivalent.

In 1924, among the Parwars, 1022 families held the title Singhai, 161 Sawai Singhai, 130 Seth, 1 Sawai Seth and 3 Shrimat Seth. Among the Golapurvas, in 1941, 1186 individuals held the title Singhai, 281 Sawai Singhai, 487 Seh and 8 Sawai Seth, out of a total population of 12569.

The Taranpanth Samaj officially does not support idols and thus do not conduct bimba pratishtas, however they conduct vedi pratishta. They now award titles Seth and Sawai Seth based on contributions to Taranpanthi institutions. Bhagwandas Jain of Sagar and his descendants were awarded the title Shrimant Seth by the Taranpanth Samaj in 1980s.

== See also ==
- Shah (Indian family name)
- Seth Mohanlal Jain Singhai
