= Jainism in Bundelkhand =

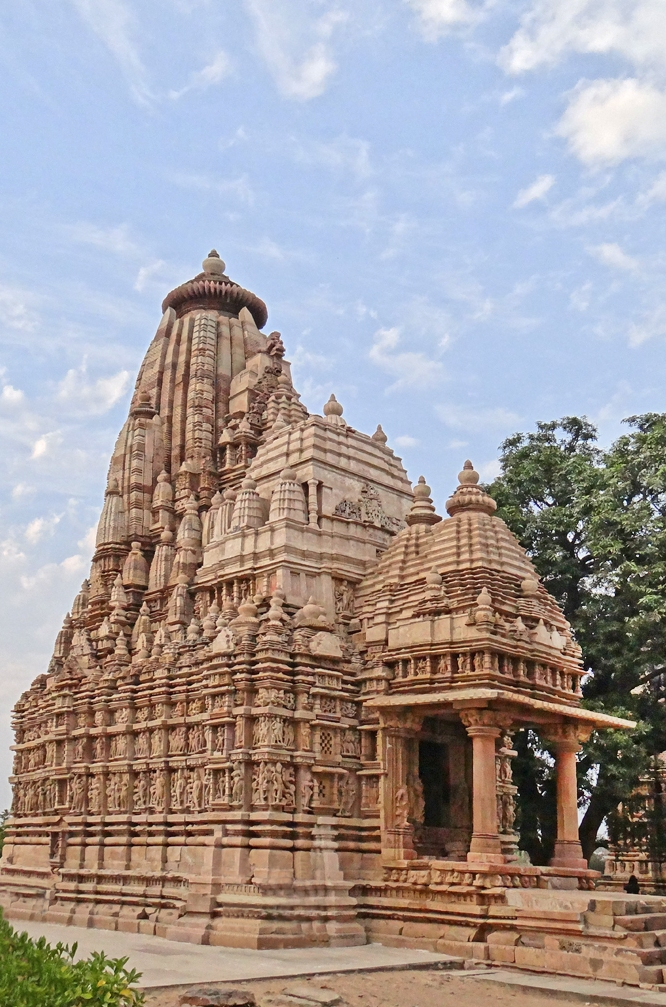
Parshvanatha temple, Khajuraho, a UNESCO World Heritage Site

Bundelkhand, a region in central India, has been an ancient center of Jainism. It covers northern part of Madhya Pradesh and south western part of Uttar Pradesh.

Bundelkhand was known as Dasharna or Jaijakabhukti in ancient times. The Betwa (Vetravati) and Dhasan (Dasharna) rivers flow through it.

It is one of the few regions in India where Jainism has a strong presence and influence. There are many ancient tirthas in Bundelkhand region. Many of the modern scholars and monks of Jainism belong to this region.

== Prominent tirthas ==
Many of the famous Jain tirthas, Vidisha, Gyaraspur, Deogarh, Lalitpur, Karguanji (Jhansi), Chanderi, Kundalpur, Khajuraho, Aharji, Paporaji, Dronagiri (Chhatarpur), Sonagir, Nainagiri, Mangalgiri (Sagar), Badagaon, Pateriaji, Beenaji, Nisaiji etc. are in this region.

== Jain communities ==
Bundelkhand is home to several Jain communities:

- Parwar
- Golapurva
- Golalare
- Teranpanthi (including Samaiya, Charanagare and Ayodhyavasi)
- Kathanera (also known as Kathanere)

The Khandelwals were originally from Rajasthan, but they have been present in Bundelkhand since ancient times.

Navalsah Chanderia in 1768 in his Vardhamana Purana mentioned 11 communities that were partly Jain. These include:

- Grihapati
- Nema
- Asati

A few among them are still Jain and follow the Teranpanthi sect.

भगवतोर्हतः चन्द्रप्रभस्य प्रतिमेऽयं कारिता महाराजाधिराज-श्री-रामगुप्तेन उपदेशात् पाणिपात्रिक-चन्द्रक्षमाचार्य्य-क्षमण-श्रमण-प्रशिष्य-आचार्य्य सर्प्पसेन-क्षमण-शिष्यस्य गोलक्यान्त्या-सत्पुत्रस्य चेलु-क्षमणस्येति

— The Ramagupta inscription found near Vidisha 375 CE

The Bhadavar region (Bhind, Morena, Etawah) is adjacent to Bundelkhand and is home to some like:

- Barhiya
- Golalare
- Kharaua
- Padmavati Purwar
- Lamenchu
- Jaiswal
- Golsinghare
- Budhele

== Gallery ==
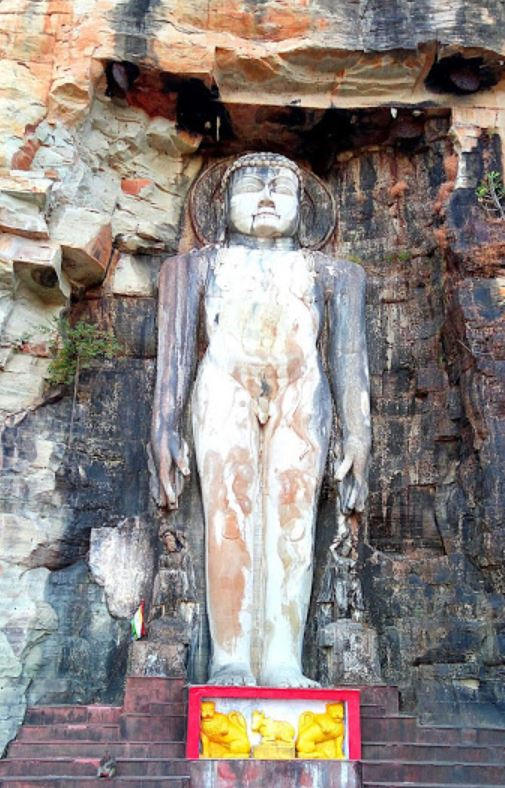
45 feet tall rock cut idol of Rishabhanatha at Khandargiri Jain Caves, Chanderi

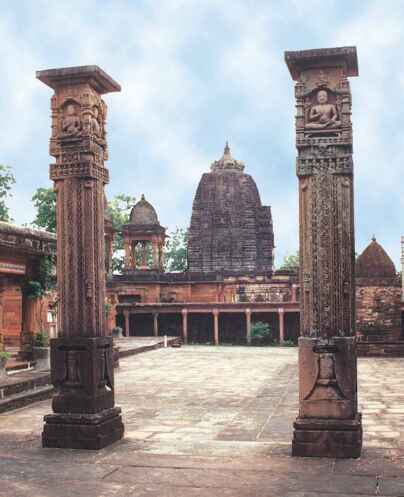
Shantinath Temple at Deogarh

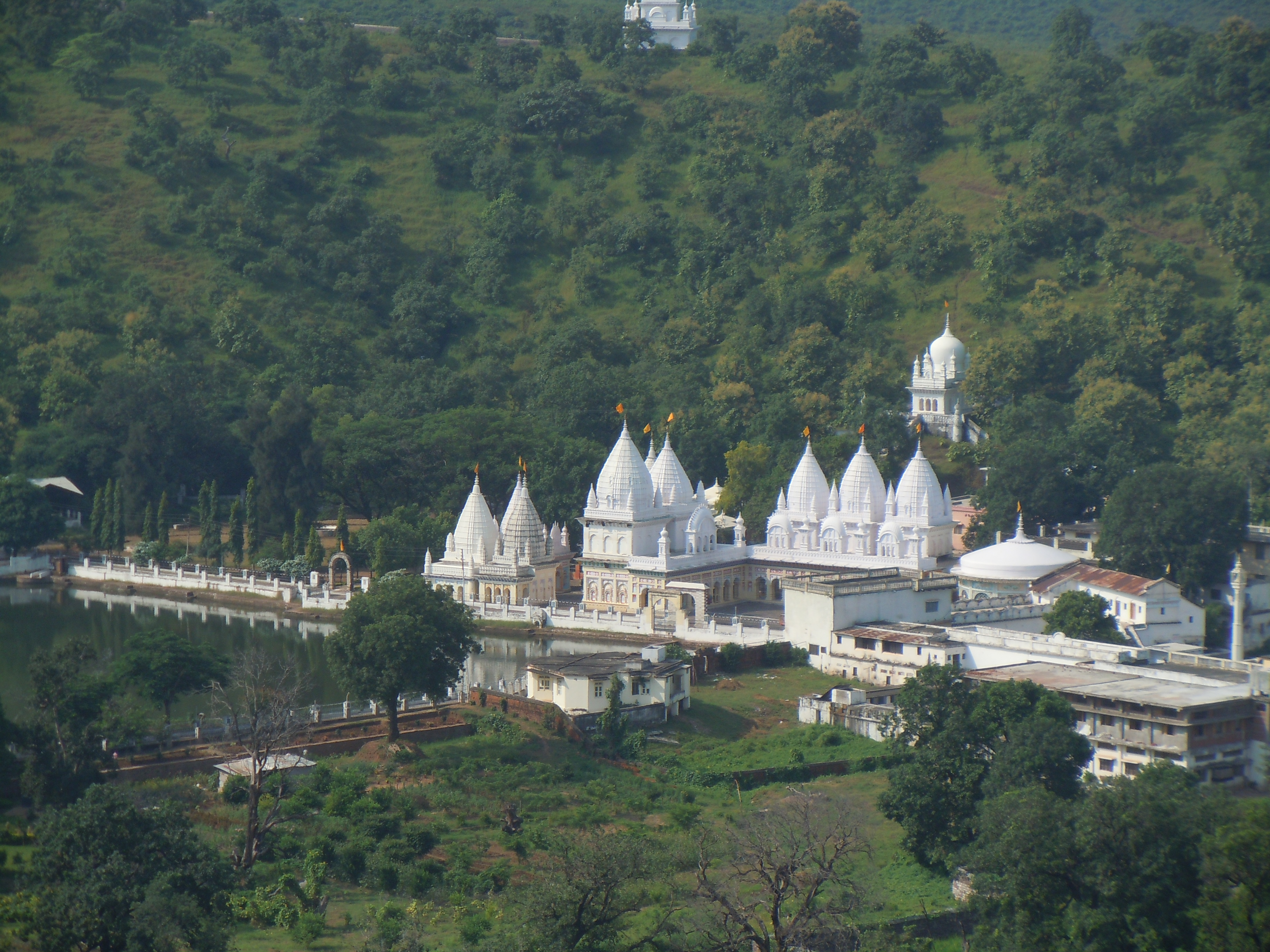
Kundalpur Tirth

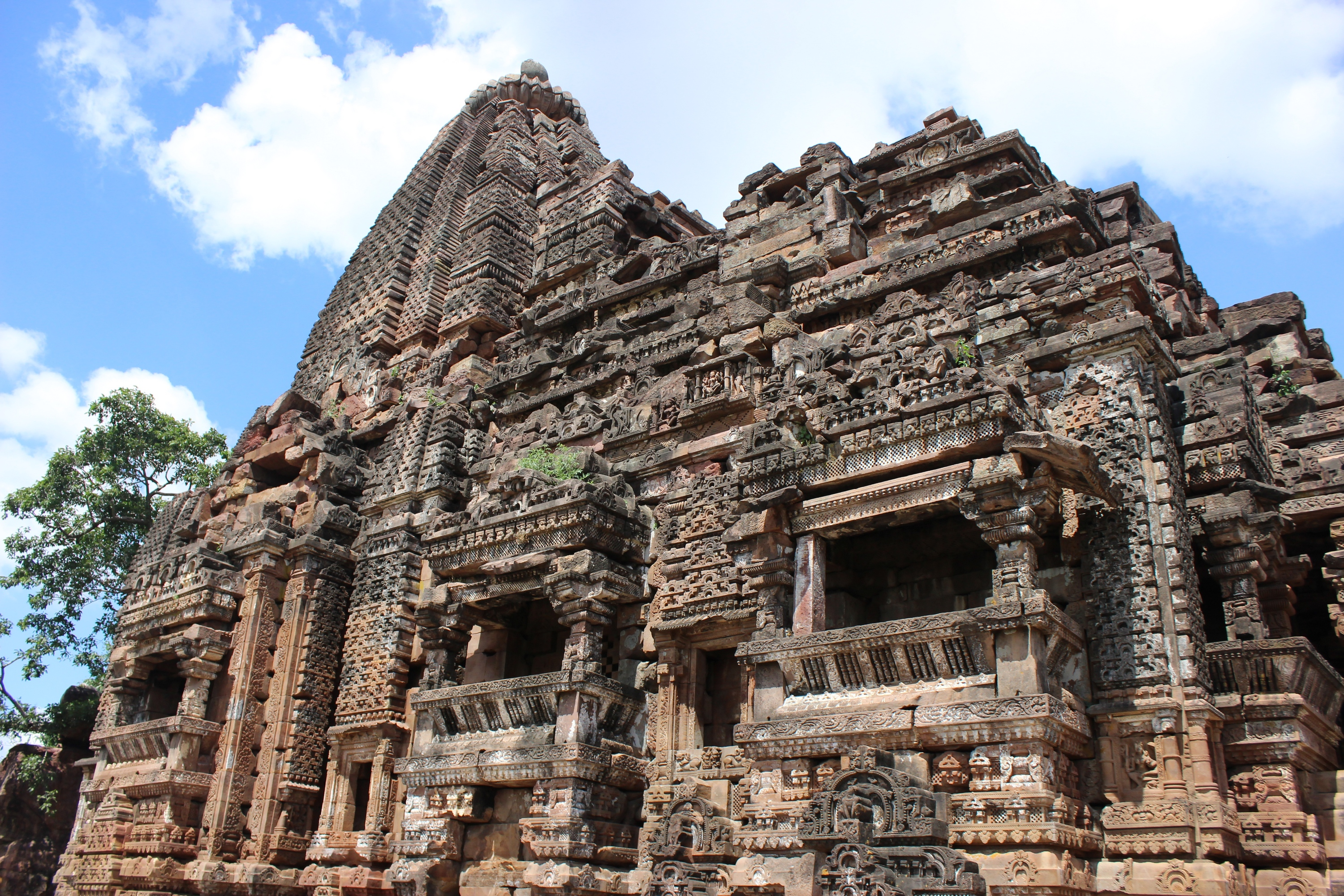
Maladevi Temple, Vidisha

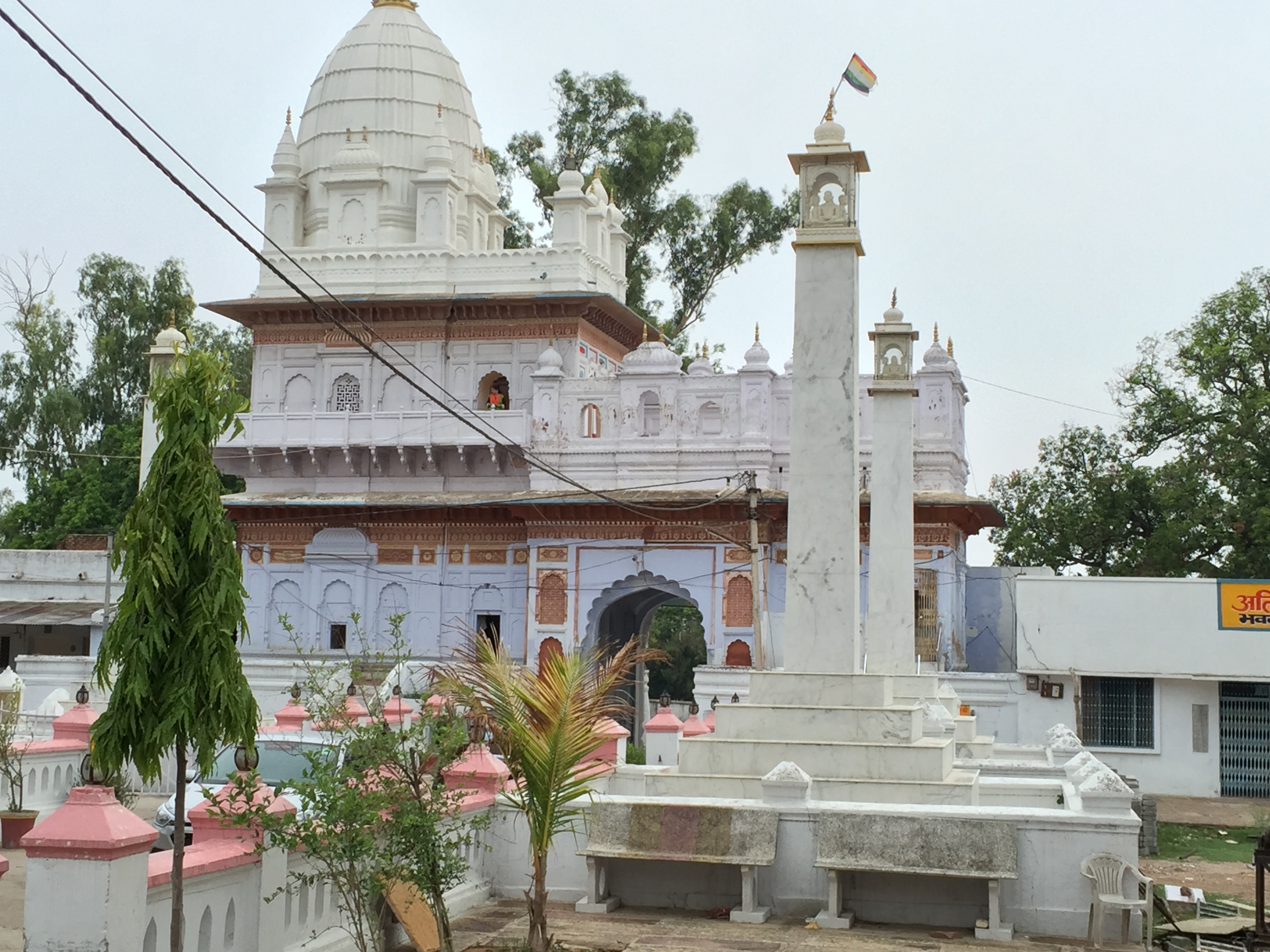
Paporaji

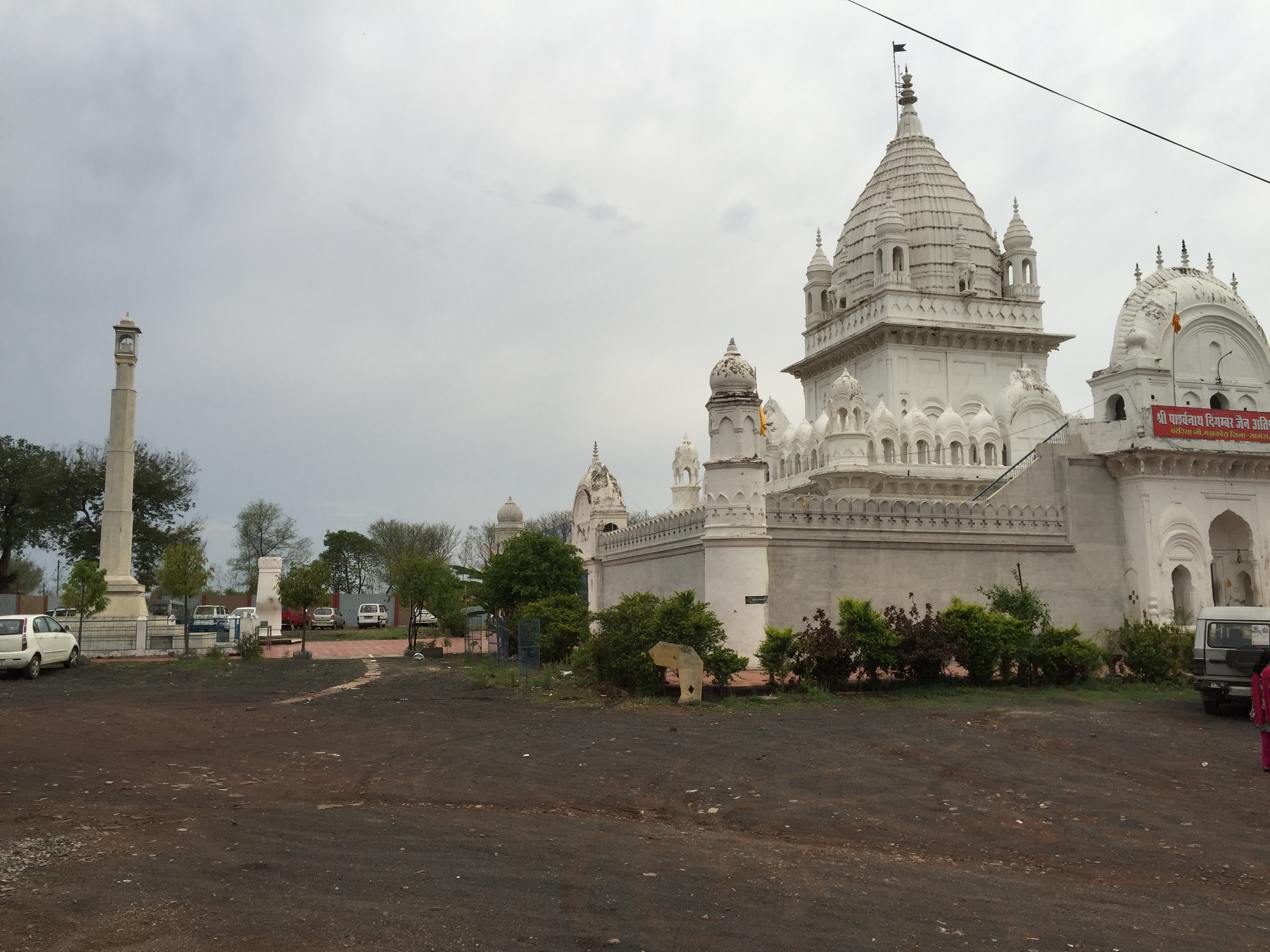
Pateriaji

== See also ==
- Mula Sangh
- Balatkara Gana
- Deogarh, Uttar Pradesh
