= Nema (community) =

Merchant community in Madhya Pradesh

Nema (or Neema or Neva) is a merchant community which is mainly found in Madhya Pradesh. It has also spread to Gujarat and Rajasthan. It originated from the Nimar region of western Madhya Pradesh, where this community is still concentrated.

Several old Jain inscriptions mentioning the Nema or Neva community have been found in Madhya Pradesh.

The Nemas are largely devout Vaishnavas. A group of Nemas that migrated to Vidarbha region a few centuries ago, follows Digambar Jainism. Those having presence in the Gujarat and Malwa region of Madhya Pradesh follow Śvetāmbara Jainism.

== Legend ==
Russell and Hira Lal state that:

They say that when Parasurāma was slaying the Kshatriyas fourteen young Rājpūt princes, who at the time were studying religion with their family priests, were saved by the latter on renouncing their Kshatriya status and declaring themselves to be Vaishyas. These fourteen princes were the ancestors of the fourteen gotras of the Nema subcaste, but the gotras actually bear the names of the fourteen Rīshis or saints who saved their lives. These sections appear to be of the usual Brāhmanical type, but marriage is regulated by another set of fifty-two subsections, with names which are apparently titular or territorial.

== See also ==
- Jainism
- Jainism in Rajasthan
