= Deogarh, Uttar Pradesh =

Deogarh
- Village
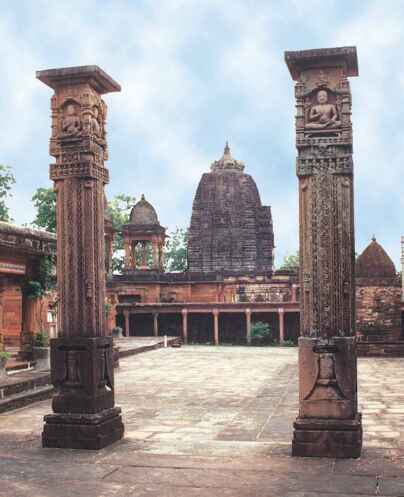
- The Shantinath Temple columns in the fort show Jain monks

- Location in Uttar Pradesh, India Deogarh (Uttar Pradesh)
- Coordinates: 24.526°N 78.238°E
- Country: India
- State: Uttar Pradesh
- District: Lalitpur

Government
  - Body: Gram panchayat

Area
  - Total: 10.49 km^{2} (4.05 sq mi)
- Elevation: 211 m (692 ft)

Population (2011)
  - Total: 783
  - Density: 74.6/km^{2} (193/sq mi)

Languages
  - Official: Hindi
- Time zone: UTC+5:30 (IST)
- PIN: 284403
- Telephone code: 0517

Deogarh is a village in Lalitpur district of the Indian state of Uttar Pradesh. It is located on the right bank of Betwa River and to the west of Lalitpur hills. It is known for Gupta monuments and for many ancient monuments of Jain origins inside and outside the walls of the fort.

The fort on the hill is dominated by a cluster of Jain temples on its eastern part, the oldest of these dating to the 8th or 9th century. Apart from Jain temples, the wall frescoes of Jain images of "iconographic and the stylistic variety", are special features of the fort. The three ghats (ghat means "flight of stone steps leading to the river"), which provide approach to the Betwa river edge from the fort – the Nahar Ghat, the Rajghat and the ghat with the Siddh ki Ghufa (saints cave) – are also of archeological significance.

The Deogarh monuments are protected by the Department of Archaeology of the Archaeological Survey of India (ASI), and managed through its Northern Circle Office located in Agra. ASI maintain an archaeological museum at the Deogarh site, which is noted for its treasured archaeological sculptures.

== Etymology ==
"Deogarh" derives from the Sanskrit Deo and garh, "God" and "fort", compounded to mean "fort of the Gods". This term, "House of God", is also widely used as a place name for villages in the vicinity of temples within fort-walls throughout India.

== Geography ==
Deogarh village, which has an area of 1,049.15 square kilometres (405.08 mi^{2}), lies on the right bank of the Betwa River, at the point where it joins the reservoir formed by the Rajghat Dam. The village also has two rock cut valleys known as Nahar Ghati (ghati means "valley") and Raj Ghati on its southern side along the river. The village is at the western end of the Lalitpur hill range, situated 33 kilometres (21 mi) south-east from Lalitpur town in Lalitpur district, 125 kilometres (78 mi) south of the divisional administrative centre at Jhansi, and 235 km from Gwalior. The nearest railway station is 12 kilometres (7.5 mi) away at Jhaklon. The village has an average elevation of 211 metres (692 ft).

The fort of Deogarh is in a valley which generally has a gentle slope. The valley is formed by the Betwa River at the western end of the hills of the Vindhya Range. Known earlier as Vetravati (Sanskrit, meaning "containing reeds"), the Betwa River is a tributary of the Yamuna River, and skirts the fort hill on its southern side. The river, flowing at a bend near the fort, has a rocky bed. It flows in a cascade of deep pools with steep rocky banks of sandstone formations. The fort is located on a precipice of the steep cliff, just above the river on its right bank.

== Demographics ==
According to the 2011 Census, the population of the Deogarh village was 783 spread over 152 households. Hindi and Bundeli are the languages spoken in the area. The distribution of male and female population was 406 and 377 respectively. The village had the presence of 331 Schedule Tribe population (165 male and 166 female) and one male of Schedule Caste. The literacy rate recorded was 377 persons (211 male and 110 female).

== History ==
Deogarh's strategic location in Northern India on the ancient route to the Deccan Plateau made it a historically important place. It was part of the Bundelkhand region which had trade and cultural links with the Deccan. Its antiquarian, archaeological and epigraphical importance are linked to the Gupta period and the Gurjara-Prathiharas during the 9th century (an inscription dated 862 found on the Shantinath temple attests this), the Chandela rulers in the 11th century, Gonds, the Muslim rulers of Delhi, the Marathas and the British eras. During the Jaina period temples were built in the Nagara style of architecture from 8th to 9th centuries extending to 17th century AD. In the Siddha-ki gufa (cave) near Raj Ghati valley inscriptions dated from 1285 to 1751 have been found.

The earliest religious influence in the Deogarh area can be traced to the Gupta period (320-550), (on the basis of an inscription on the Nahar Ghati) known as the "golden period" of Indian history. This was followed by the Jain period between the 8th and 17th centuries, where innumerable temples have been traced.

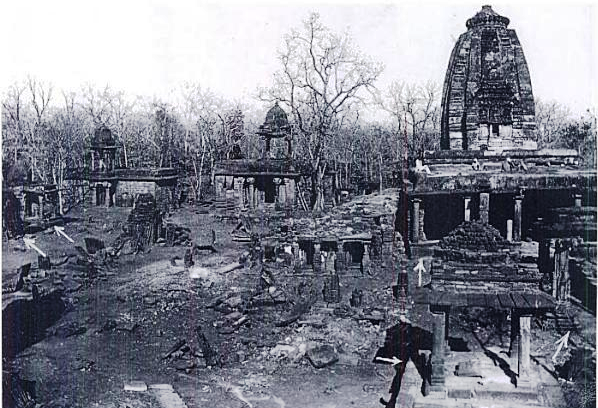
The Shantinath Temple (right) in the Jain temple complex in 1918 before restoration

The present village's history has not been examined at depth, even though many inscriptions have been located in the fort and the valley, relating to various stylistic and palaeographical denominations. Although the dynasties who ruled over the territory are known, who built what is not clear, except for the Jain temples, which were built by the merchant Jain community. More archaeological explorations would therefore be essential, to establish the linkages of building activities with the dynasties who ruled over the territory, considering the enormous amount of Hindu and Jain temple remains and artifacts found here.

The earliest history of Deogarh is that of the architectural evolution traced to the ancient Gupta period, which flourished between the 4th and 6th centuries in Northern India. During this period, the arts, science and literature saw aesthetic evolution. It was the period when Brahminical, Buddhist and Jain activities flourished.

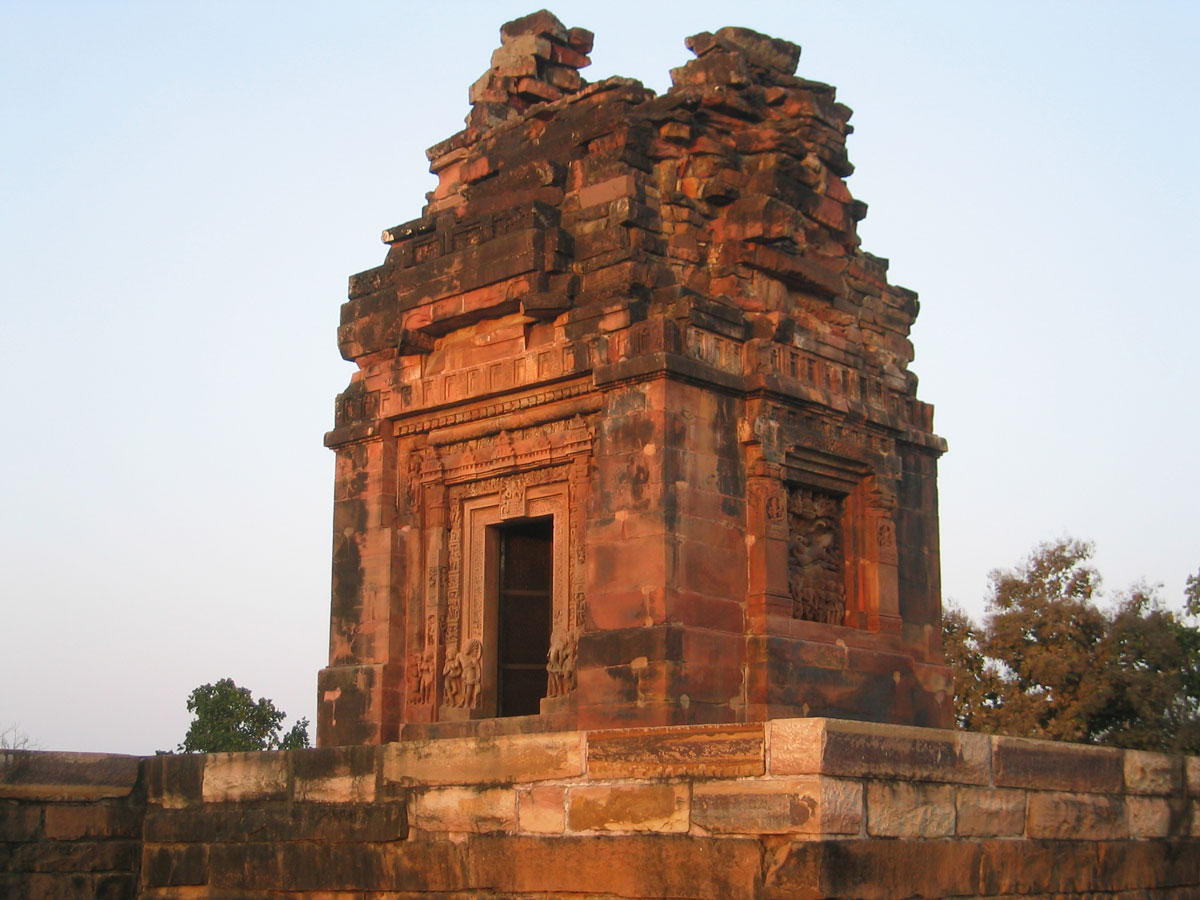
The Dashavatara temple or Vishnu temple, also called Gupta temple at Deogarh

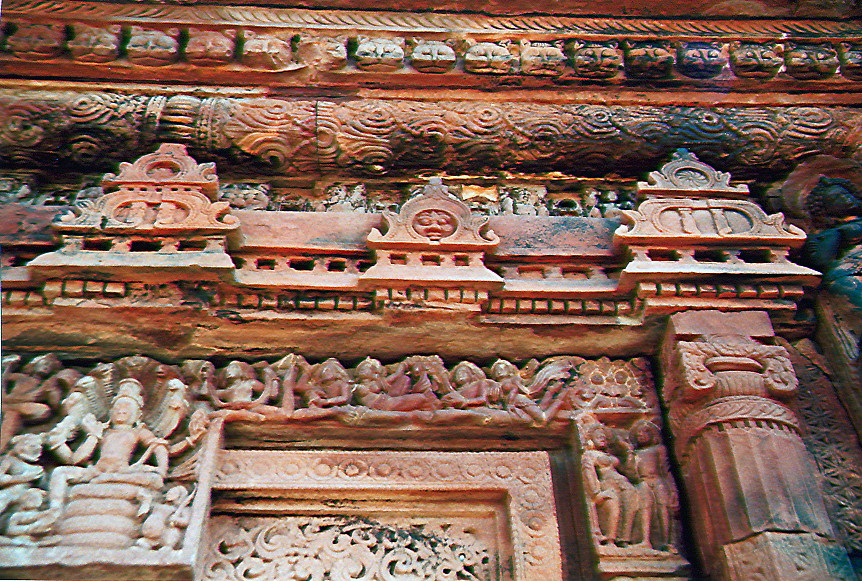
Entry frame of the Dashavatara temple

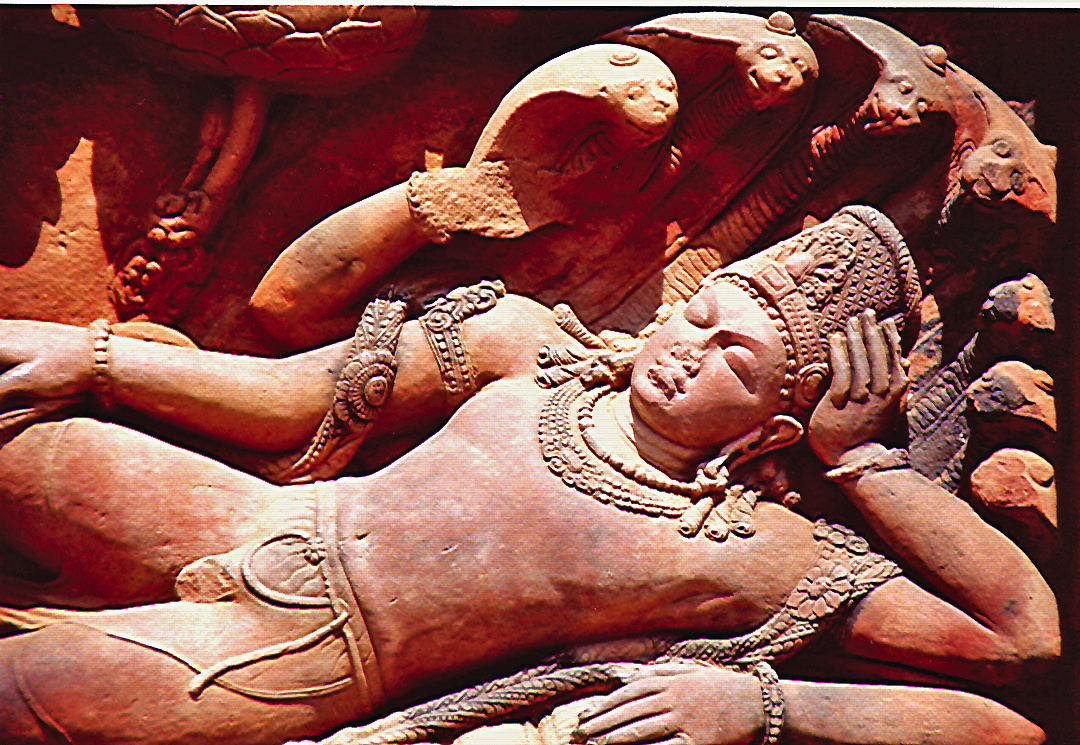
Vishnu reclining on the serpent Shesha (Ananta) on a side panel of the Vishnu temple of 5th century.

During this time, sculptural arts peaked and "India entered upon the classical phase of sculpture". Even though Guptas were Hindu rulers, the cultures of Buddhism and Jainism also flourished during their reign. During this period, Buddhist sculptures were more puritanical with total elimination of nudity in its depictions. However, transparent tight fitting drapery were dictated by moral values and hence, were restrained. Indian temple architecture emerged with figurine sculptures in decorative settings, attaining excellence of form. This is inferred from the large panel of Sheshashayi Vishnu (Hindu god Vishnu reclining on the serpent Shesha) at the Deogarh temple.

== Monuments ==
The Deogarh monuments can be categorized based on their location at valley and fort temples, which are generally built with sand stones of brick-red colour. The valley temples are mostly Hindu temples from the Gupta period near the Deogarh village.

=== Jain temple complex ===
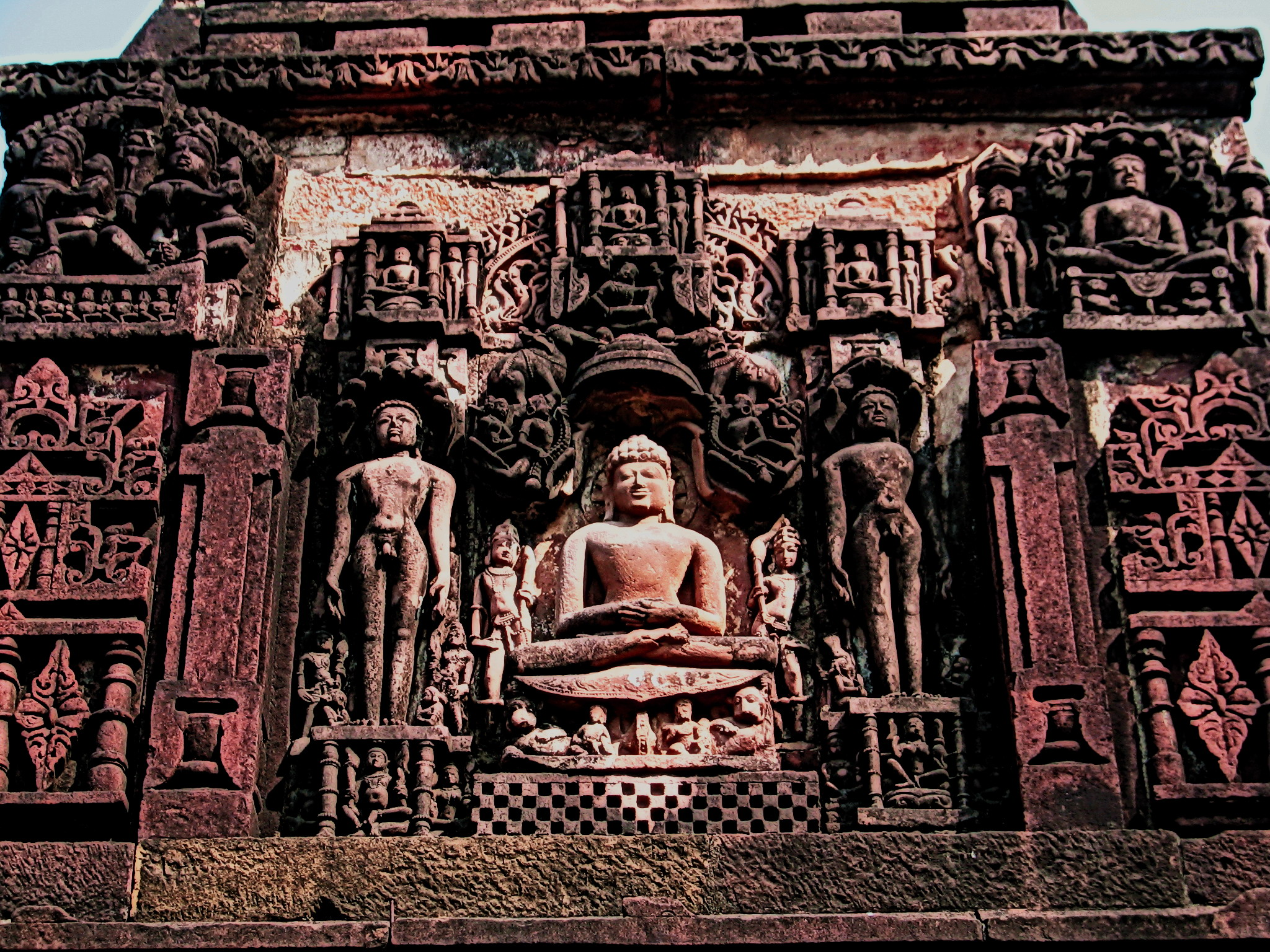
Pārśva and other tirthankaras from Jainism depicted on a panel in the Shantinath Temple

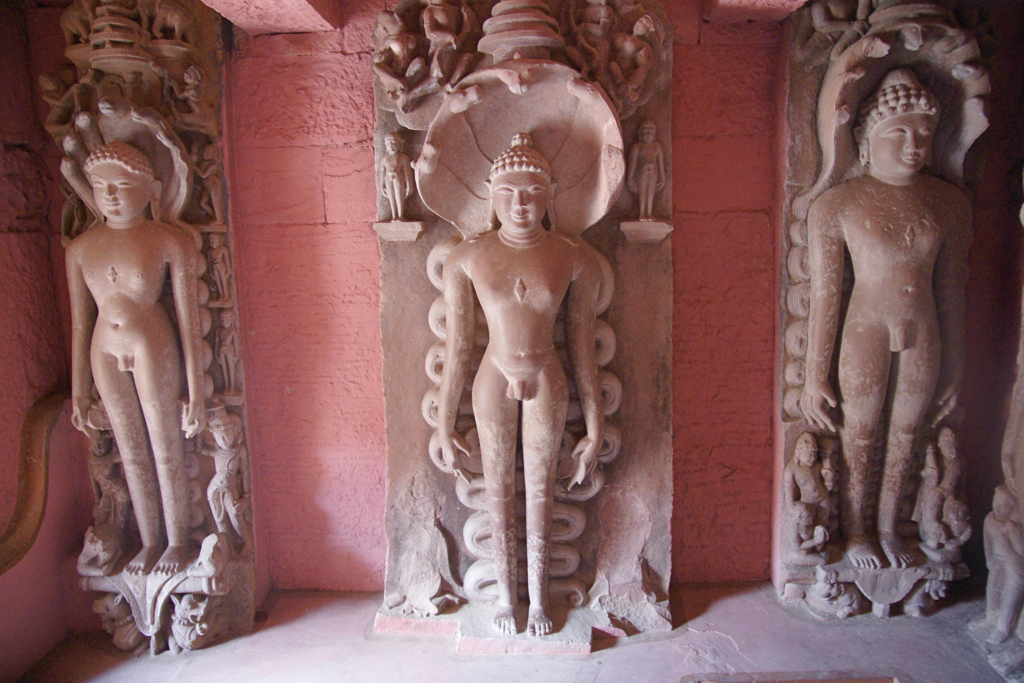
Pārśva and Supārśva

The fort temples are dominated by the Jain temples in the eastern part of the hill fort; the Jaina images here are mostly of the "iconographic and the stylistic variety". The Jain complex was built during 8th to the 17th century and consist of 40 Jain temples housing around 2,000 sculptures which is largest such collection in world. The Jain temples have a large number of panels depicting scenes from Jain mythology, Tirthankara images and votive tablets. The pillars are carved with a thousand Jain figures.

All temples are categorized into two distinct periods: the early medieval period and the medieval period. During the Islamic iconoclastic depredations the temples were devastated; this was compounded by the growth of vegetation and neglect of maintenance. The Jain community is managing the temples since 1939 and have done some restoration work.

The extravagance of the intricacies of the Jain sculptures are similar to that of nearby Gwalior in Madhya Pradesh and adjoining areas of Bihar. Jain sculptures lie scattered on both sides of the path from the gate, on the walls of the fort. A notable pillar seen here is called the Manastambha. The complete image of each of the 24 tirthankaras depicting the emblem of a bird, flower or animal are seen here. Images of Yaksha and Yakshini are also part of such depictions. Thousands of sculptures are seen embedded in the walls surrounding the complex. The large number of idols lying scattered around the fort area is attributed to the fact that this was the sculptors' workshop.

Worship at some of the Jain temples are still held regularly. The most famous of the Jain temples in the fort is the Shantinath temple, which was built before 862 AD. This temple committee oversees the protection of the monuments and work to improve the ambience of the entire place. It has been suggested however, that restoration works be carried out on more scientific terms, following guidelines set by UNESCO's World Heritage Sites.

=== Dashavatara temple ===
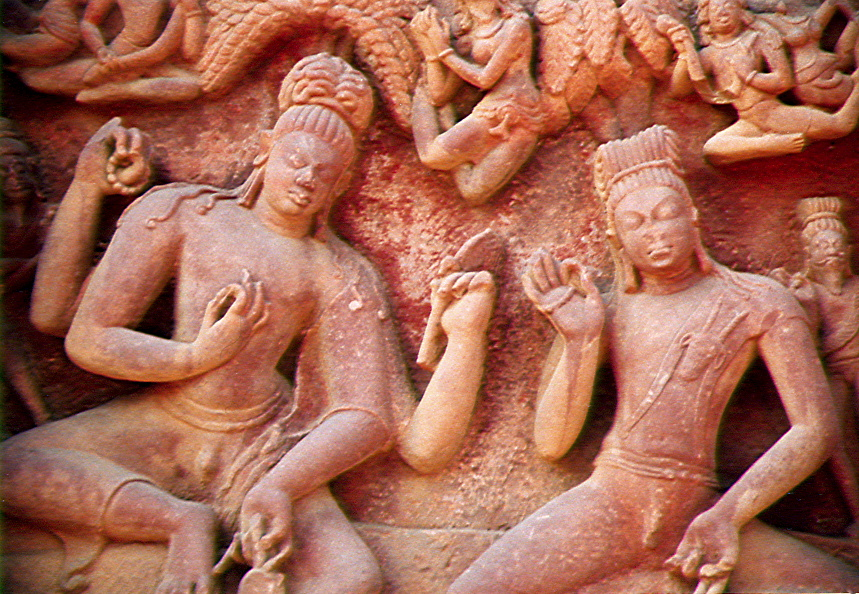
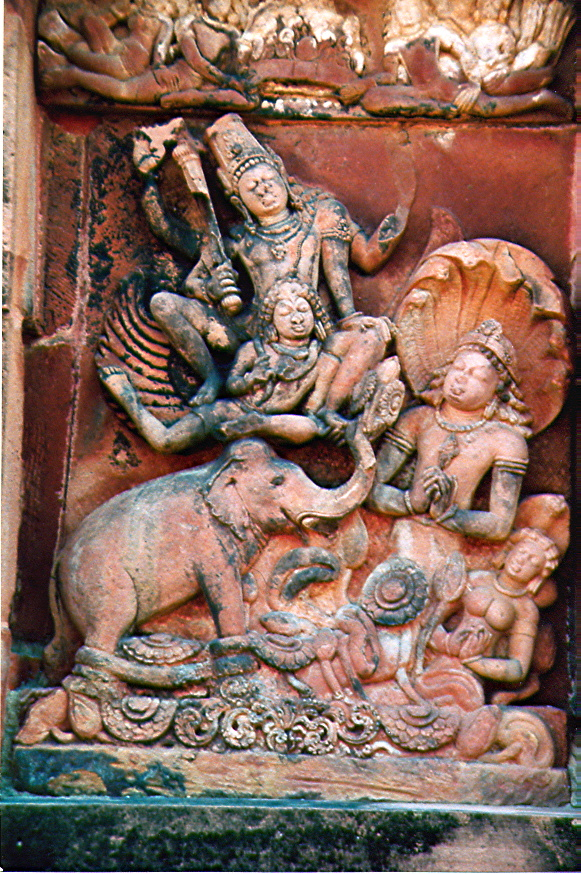
Left: Nara Narayana panel on the eastern wall of the Dashavatara temple. Right: Carved panel of Gajendra Moksha - Vishnu saves Gajendra, the elephant from clutches of crocodile on one of the walls of the Dashavatara temple.

The "Dashavatara Temple" or "Gupta Temple", built in 400-500 AD, is one of the oldest Hindu temple that is still existent until modern era. The temple dedicated to god Vishnu, was first discovered by Captain Charles Strahan. It was given its name by the archaeologist, Cunnigham. Archaeologists have inferred that it is the earliest known Panchayatana temple in North India. It was subsequently renamed by Cunningham as Dashavatara Mandir or Dashavatara Temple (because the temple depicts ten incarnations of Vishnu), and also as Sagar Marh (meaning: the temple by the well). It was the first North Indian temple with a shikhara or tower, although the shikhara is curtailed and part of it has disappeared. The temple has a high plinth and is set with a basement porch. The Dashavatara temple has a "compelling presence" in spite of its dilapidated condition. Sculpted panels are seen on the terraced basement, with carved figurines of river goddesses Ganga and Yamuna flanking the doorway to the sanctum sanctorum. In addition, on the side walls, three large carved panels of Vaishnava mythology related to Gajendra Moksha, the Nara Narayana Tapasya (austerities), and the Sheshashayi Vishnu (reclining on the serpent), are portrayed. A protective wall made of undressed stone was built around the temple after it was first discovered. However, the idol of the sanctum sanctorum of the temple is missing, believed to have been relocated elsewhere. The ancient treatise Vishnudharmottara Purana describes several temples including a "Sarvatobhadra temple", which has been identified by archaeologists and Indologists with the Dashavatara Temple.

=== Fort ===
The fort on the hill is located a few hundred yards east of Deogarh village. The fort, when originally built, was known as 'Karnali'. Subsequently, it was renamed "Kirtigiridurga" after it was built in 1057 (samvat 1154) during the reign of Chandela king Kirttivarman. However, some believe that fort was built earlier by the Pratihara rulers of Kannauj in the 9th century, changed hands from the builders to the Chandelas and the Bundelas, before it came under the control of the Scindias of Gwalior.

The fort has an external wall for the most part, except in stretches where the steep hill slopes towards the Betwa river. It is also subdivided by many internal walls. A circular structure, the west gate and the east gate (south-east of the Jain temples) are notable monuments. Additionally, there are two gates of entry into the fort, the "Hathi Darvaja" meaning "Elephant gate", and "Delhi Darvaja" which means "Delhi gate".

There are three ghats which provide approach to the Betwa river edge, which have archaeological significance. These are the Nahar Ghat, the Rajghat and the Ghat, with the Siddi ki Ghufa (Saints cave).

The Nahar Ghat ("nahar" or nav means boat, but also means canal. Either boat or canal could be interpreted because steps leading to water) at the east end of the fort, has steep steps that go down from the plateau of the fort to the Betwa river. The ghat is aligned parallel to the wall of the cliff and the river. The "Siddhi ki Ghufa" (Cave of the Saint), is an archaeological find, located on the cliff wall to the left, along the descent from the Nehar Ghat. While descending via the Rajghat, the cliff wall is to the right. It is a plain cave. The cave depicts, on its right, an image of the goddess Mahishasuramardini.

The cliffs above the three ghats are embellished with Gupta sculptures and inscriptions dating from various periods. The Nahar Ghat has about a dozen niches, which house lingas and various deities. From an archaeological perspective, this ghat is considered the richest of the three flights of steps. The Rajghat (Kings steps) also accommodate more than a dozen niches with lingas and statues, but the sculptures are small and in an unfinished state.

Matrika statues (seated) are also important archaeological finds at the Nehar Ghat and Rajghat sections, as they establish early sculptural activity in the 6th century. Both these matrika panels are flanked by images of Vinadhara Shiva (Shiva as "bearer of the vina") and his son Ganesha, though with differences in detailing. The sculpted figurines show large breasts, tiny waists and broad hips.

The Varaha temple dated to 7th century is situated in the southeast corner of the fort. It is located on a high jagati or platform. But it is in ruins except for a few architectural fragments such as a door frame and a pillar of an entrance porch. The mainidol has been moved to the sculpture shed here.

== See also ==
- Parwar
- Jainism in Bundelkhand
