= Nainagiri =

Indian pilgrimage site

Nainagiri (Reshandigiri)
- नैनागिरि (Hindi); Nainagiri Siddha Kshetra
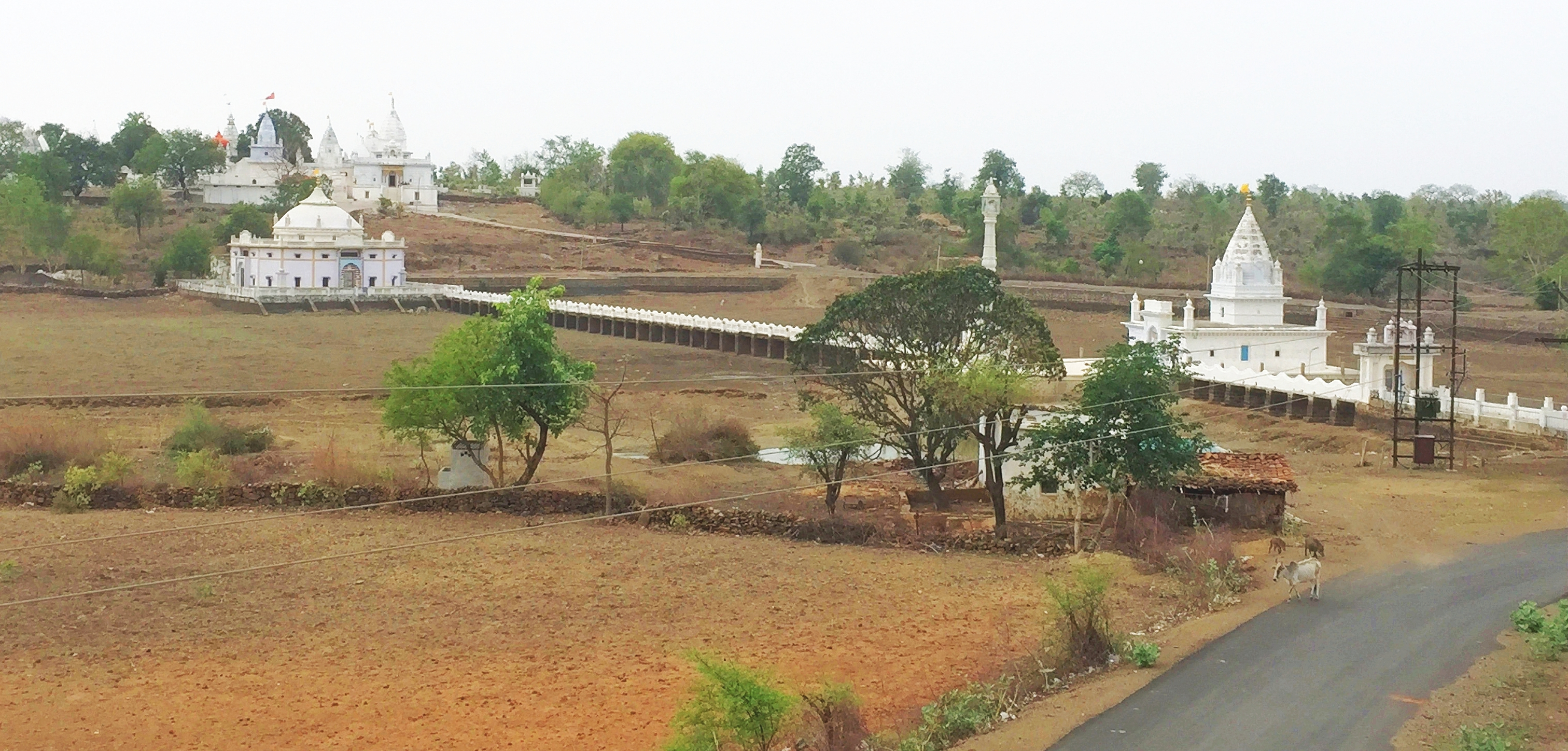
- Jain Siddha Kshetra Reshandigiri

Religion
- Affiliation: Jainism
- Deity: Parshvanatha
- Festival: Mahavir Jayanti
- Governing body: Shri 1008 Dig. Jain Siddha Kshetra Nainagiri (Reshandigiri) Management Committee

Location
- Location: Chhatarpur, Madhya Pradesh
- Interactive map of Nainagiri (Reshandigiri)
- Coordinates: 24.139°N 79.119°E

Architecture
- Established: 1053 AD
- Temple: 41

Website
- www.nainagirijainteerth.com

Nainagiri is a major pilgrimage site for Jainism in India. It is located in the central Indian state of Madhya Pradesh, it is 12 km from Dalpatpur and 25 km from Bukswaha. This tirth, also known as Reshandigiri, is a Siddha Kshetra where five ancient saints including Varadatta had attained nirvana.

== Significance ==
According to ancient Nirvanakanda text:

पासस्स समवसरणे सहिया वरदत्त मुणिवरा पंच |
रिस्सिन्देगिरि सिहरे णिव्वाण गया णमो तेसिं ||

Translation: Here at Resandigiri, the samosharana of Lord Parshvanath had come and Varadatta etc. five munis had attained nirvana. We bow to them.

Similar mentions are made in Hindi Nirvanakanda (1684 AD) of Bhaiya Bhagavatidas, and 1882 marathi text of Bhattaraka Devendrakirti of Karanja.

== Nainagiri Jain Tirtha Complex ==
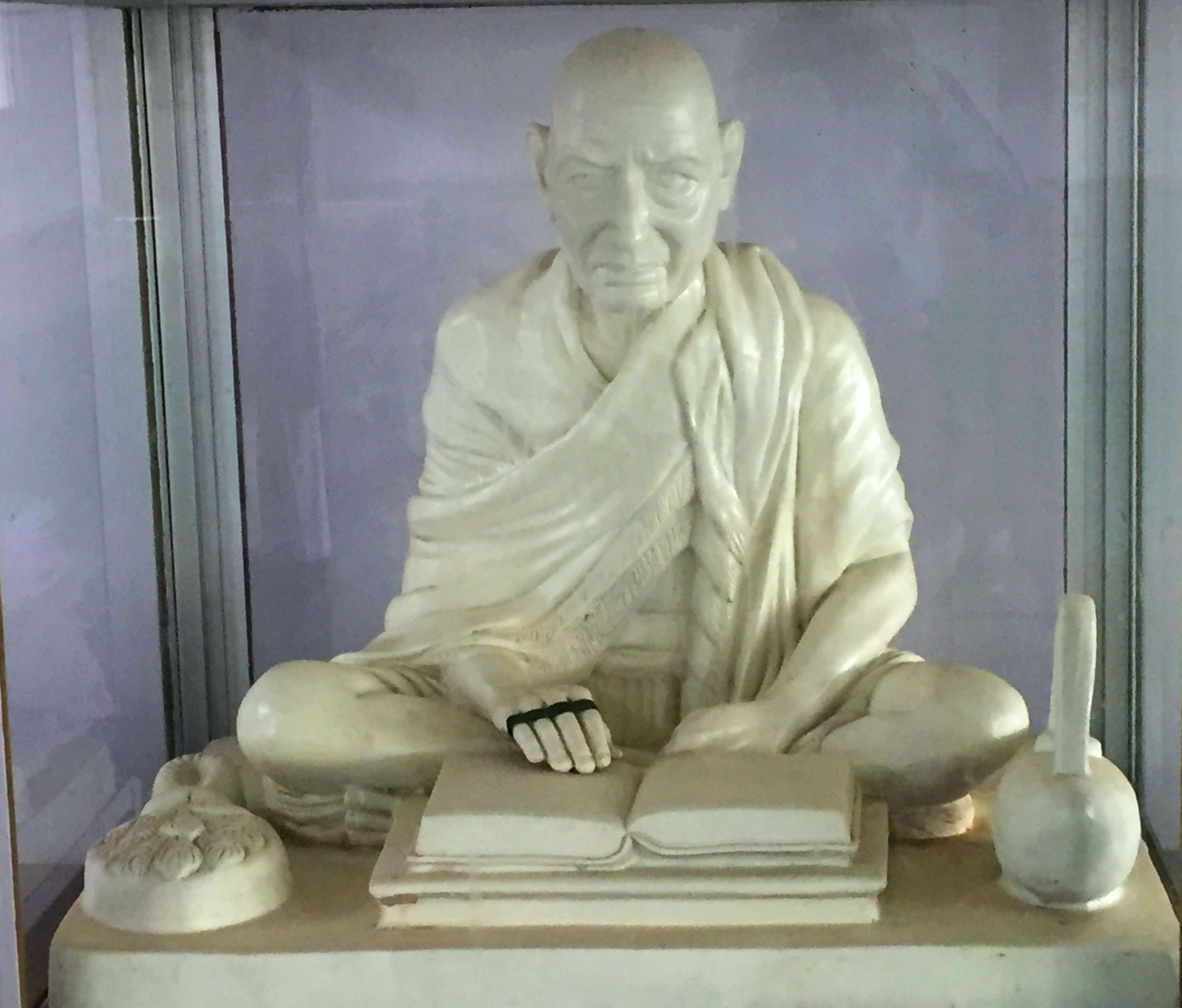
Statue of Kshullaka Ganeshprasad Varni at Nainagiri

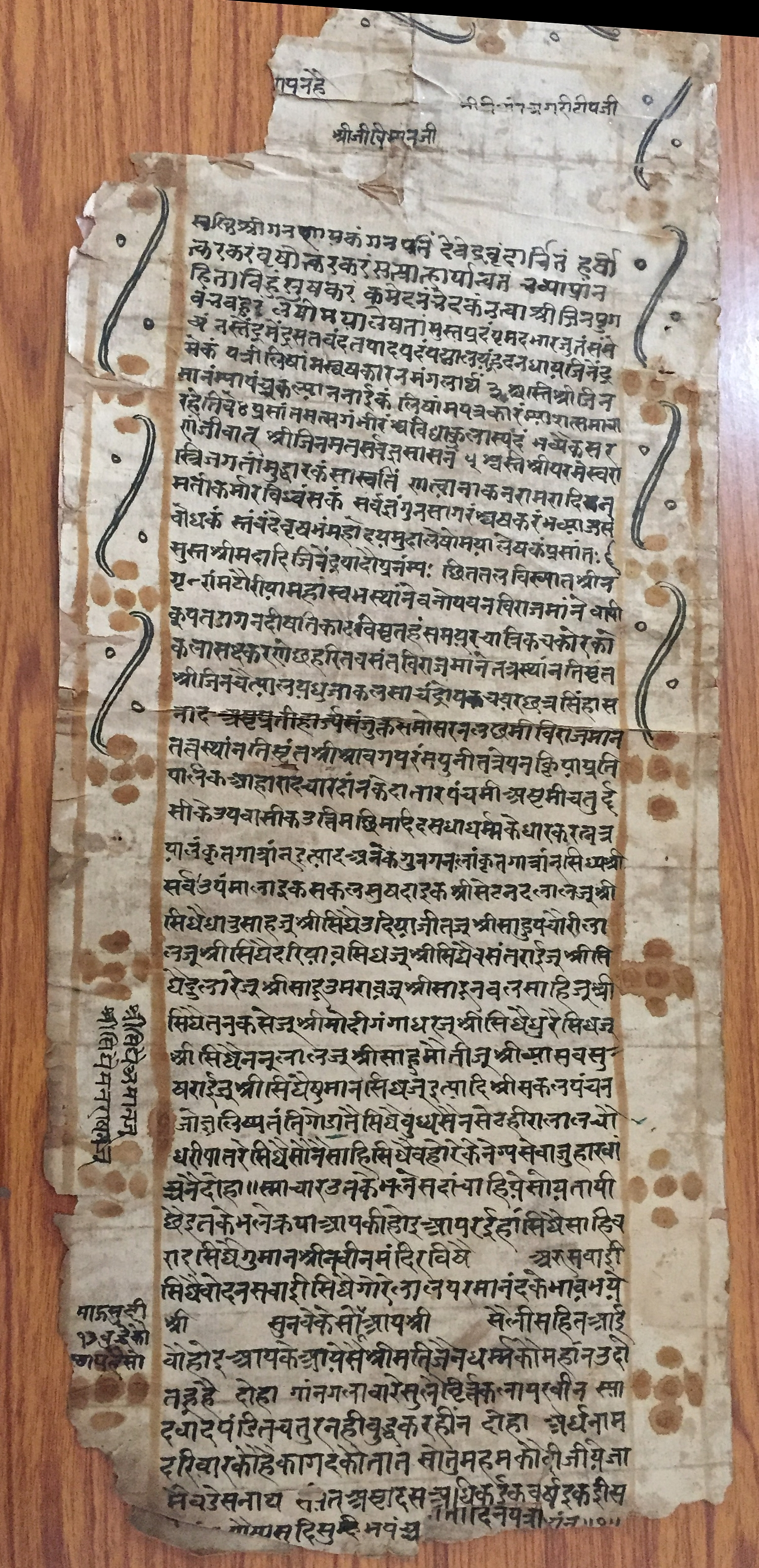
Historical document in the research center: Invitation from Ramtoria sangh

Naingiri Tirthkshetra includes a temple complex on the hill, two temples besides a lake, temples in the valley and a nearby siddha-shila.

The main temple complex is situated on a low hill, with 36 Jain Temples on hill and 15 in valley. The Jala-Mandir temple is in the middle of a pond, with a manastambha in the front. There is also a Samosharana Mandir on the other side of the pond. All the Jain temples on hill are surrounded by a wall.

The oldest temple, termed Bara Mandir, which is the eleventh temple, was unearthed a few centuries ago. According to an inscription of the temple, the year of completion was V.S. 1109 (1053 AD). The principal deity of this temple is Lord Parsvanatha in Kayotsarga 4 feet 7 inches high. This was installed in V.S. 2015 (1959 AD). A beautiful and artistic Gomeda Yaksha and Yakshini Ambika idol is also present here, with the Yakshini with a child in her lap.

The Parshvanath temple (Chauvisi Mandir) is the largest temple with a 16 foot tall idol of Lord Parshvanath of 1953 AD, along with images of the 24 tirthankaras and the images of the five munis who attained moksha here.

The picturesque Jal Mandir of Nainagiri was featured on the 2002 JAINA calendar. Recently a tall manastambha was erected in front of it. The grand circular samosharana mandir features paintings of famous tirthas.

Near the temple complex, there is a large rock in river Bevas termed siddha shila. It is said that on this rock Vardatta etc. minis attained nirvana. There is also an ancient altar about a mile from the tirtha. The rock has many prehistorical petroglyphs.

An old dharmashala building built by Shobharam Malaiya now houses an extensive library called "Acharya Devanandi D. J. Svadhyaya avam Shodha Sansthan". It also houses rare handwritten manuscripts. There are facilities for scholars to stay.

Nearby Singhai Satishchandra Keshardevi Higher Secondary School provides education to the local children.

== Recent History ==
A number of temples have images installed in VS 1943-1948 (1886-1892 AD). This was the time when Nainagiri emerged a major tirtha. In VS 1943 (AD 1886) a large pratishtha function with three separate gajarath chariots was organized, where one lakh (100,000) Jains are said to have attended.

In 1833 AD, Bhattaraka Surendrakirti of Gwalior had visited the tirtha while travelling to Shravanabelgola. He arrived from Dronagir and then proceeded to Kundalpur.

The tirth was often visited by Kshullaka Ganeshprasad Varni. In 1919, a convention was organized that inaugurate the Bharatvarshiya Golapurva Digambar Jain Sabha under his leadership.

Acharya Vidyasagar visited the tirtha, a spot where he took ahara (food offered by shravakas) and recovered from a serious ailment in 1978, is marked and is revered by the pilgrims. He stayed here during his chaturmas in 1978, 1981 and 1982, and also visited it at other times. He had given diksha to 72 munis and aryikas here. Acharyas Vishuddha Sagar and Vibhava Sagar have also been present on special events.

Baba Daulatram Varni had established a pathshala here in 1902, which was among the earliest in the Bundelkhand region. He wrote several books here including a bhasha (translation/commentary) of Gommatsar Jivakanda in 1904. The manuscript was reported as having been lost by Ganeshprasad Varni, however recently Suresh Jain has located the manuscripts and is being published. A memorial marking his samadhi in 1908 is present just outside the compound.

Famous Jain scholar Dr. Darbari Lal Kothia was born here.

== Facilities ==
There are three dharmashalas with the overall capacity of 1000. There is a bhojanalaya. There are facilities for visiting monks and scholars and a research library.

== Location ==
The place is located in tehsil Buxwaha, District – Chhatarpur, Madhya Pradesh. It is 13 km from Dalpatpur located on the Sagar-Kanpur National Highway 86.Nearest Bus Stand Dalpatpur 13 km, Buxwaha 25 km. Nearest Railway Station Sagar 58 km.

== Gallery ==
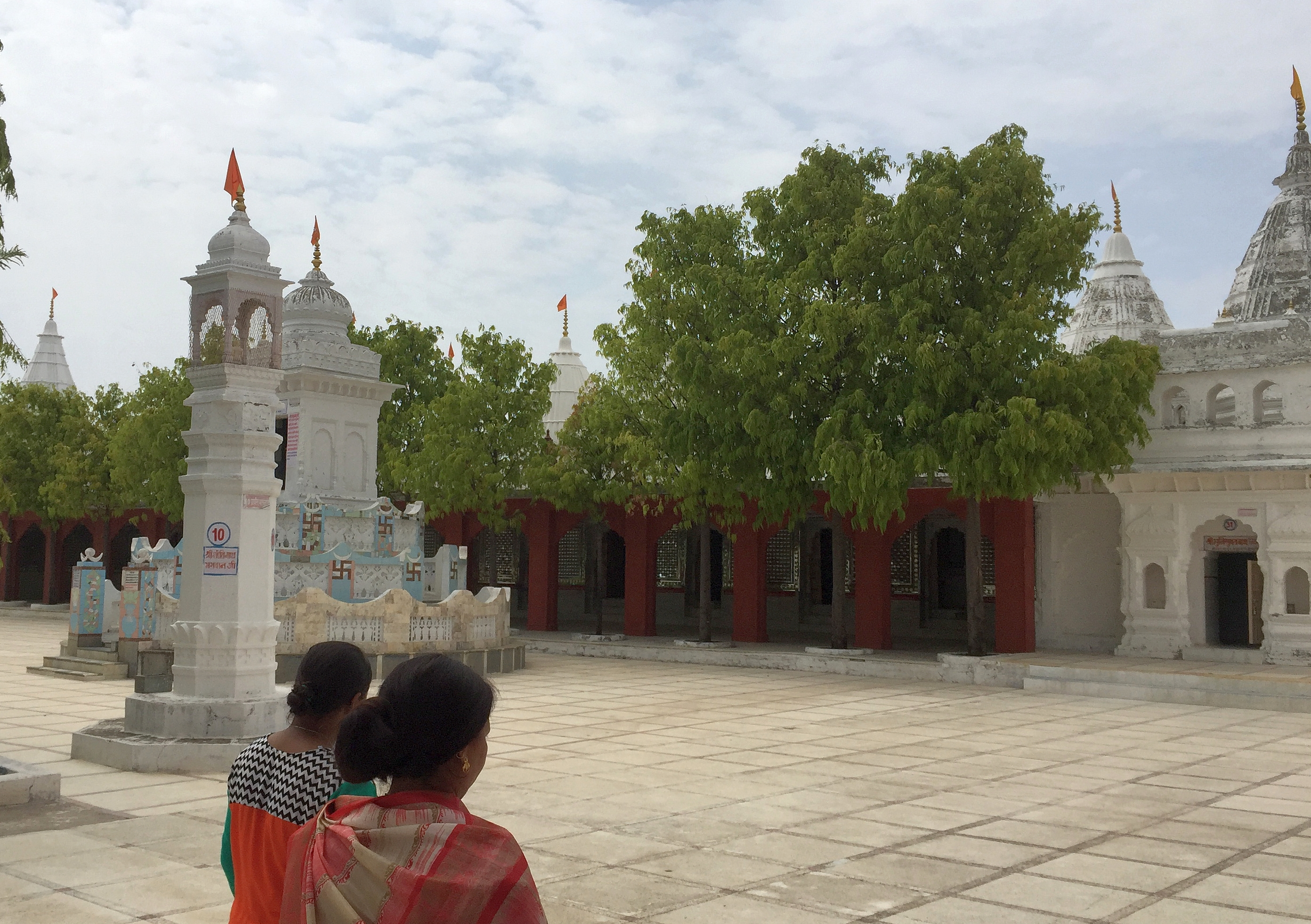
Nainagiri temple compound

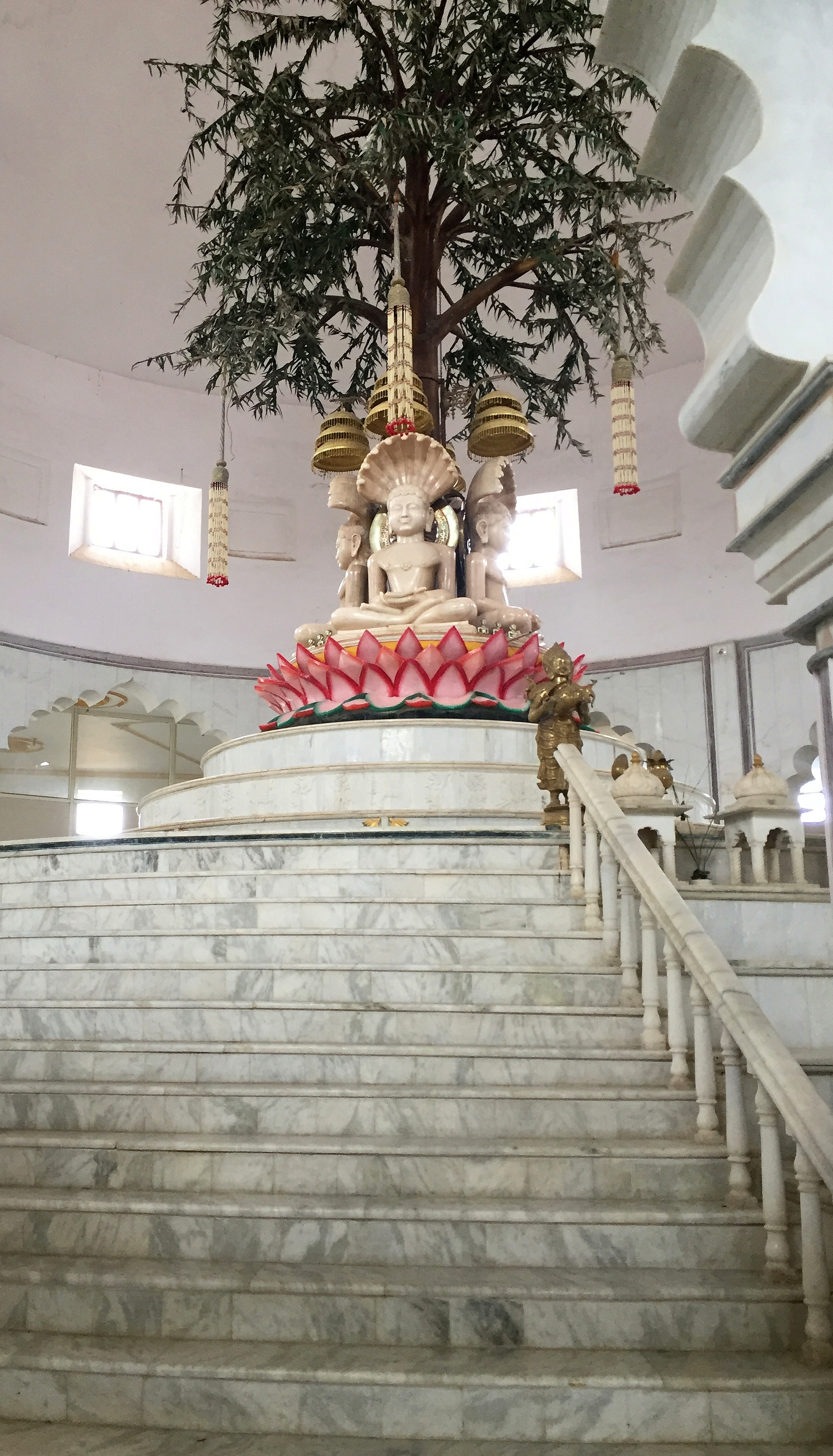
Nainagiri Samosharana temple

== See also ==
- Tirtha
- Jainism in Bundelkhand
- Aharji
