= Golalare =

Subgroup of Jain Community

Golalare (Sanskrit गोलाराडे, Hindi गोलालारे ) is a Jain community of Bhadawar and Bundelkhand region in India. Their original center is the Bhind-Etawah region on the banks of the Chambal river. Some of them have migrated to Bundelkhand region.

A section of the Golalare community is settled in Bundelkhand. Poet Devidas (Vikram 1780-1830 i.e. AD 1723-1773) of Digauda town in the Orchha kingdom, writes that his ancestors lived in the Sikasikahara village in the Bhadawar region. He mentions that his family belonged to Kharaua clan of the Golalare community.

A major section of the Golalare in the Bhadavar region are now known as Kharaua. Several clans of the Kharaua community have the title Pande (i.e. Pandit). These families produced scholars and priests. The bhattarakas of Balatkara Gana who had a seat at Ater, and Rura, were born in this community. Bhattaraka Gyanbhushan of Sagwada seat in Gujarat also belonged to this community.

== History ==
One of the earliest inscriptions from samvat 1237 mentioning the community have been found in the Aharji Jain Teerth Jain tirth, which was a major pilgrimage center during the rule of Chandela king Paramardi.

According to some of the inscriptions, the Golalare are descendants of the ancient Ikshvakus. This inscriscption mentions the dedication of a rock-carved shrine on the south-east side of the Gwalior fort near the rock-carved water reservoir.

सिद्धेभ्यः श्री ...सम्वत्‌ 1525 वर्षे चैत्र सुदी 15 मूलसंघे सरस्वती गच्छे बलाकार गणे श्री कुन्दकुन्दाचार्यान्वये आम्नाय भट्टारक श्री प्रभाचंद्र देवा ततो पट्टे .. भट्टारक श्री सिंहकीर्ति यतीश्वरा तेषाम्‌ उपदेशात्‌ श्री गोपाचल महादुर्गे श्री तोमरान्वये महाराजाधिराज श्री कीर्तिसिंह विजयराजे। ...सिद्ध प्रतिष्ठा श्री इक्ष्वाकु वंशोन्दवा गोलारोड ति मद्ये संघातिपति पम ॥श्री॥ ...सुहाग श्री तत्पुत्रा माणिक सं. अश्वपति सं. कुषराज सं.... ये तषाम मध्ये संघादिपतियम्‌। भूपतयः बंधु निज पुत्र पौत्रो श्री पार्श्वनाथ तीर्थश्वरम्‌ नित्यं पूज्याम्‌ प्रणमति श्री शांति रस्तु शिवम्‌ सुख नित्य आरोग्य भवतु... सिद्धरस्तु शत्रु निवारन कुल गोत्र वंशादष्टु इति श्री राजा श्रावक प्रजासुखी नो भवन्तु धर्मोवृद्धिताम्‌ श्री॥

— A Gwalior Fort Inscription Samvat 1525

The title Sanghapati (or Singhai) is awarded to a distinguished community member who conducts Gajarath Pratishtha.

== See also ==
- Chanderi
- Balatkara Gana
- Jainism in Bundelkhand
- Golapurva
