= Jain temples of Khajuraho =

UNESCO World Heritage Site in India

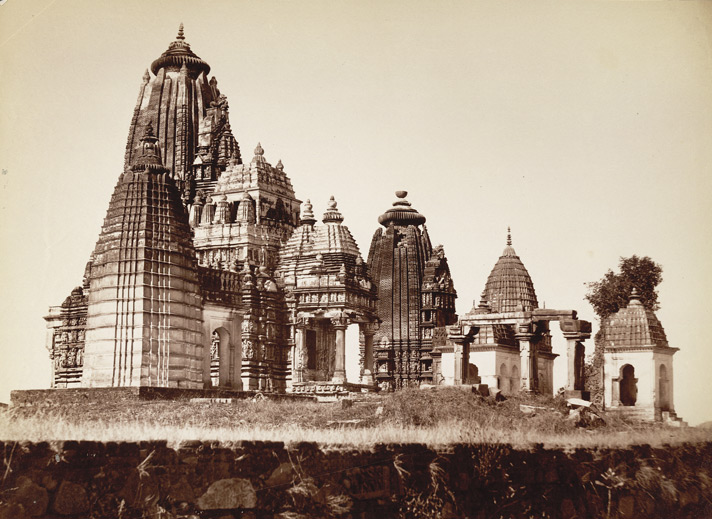
Jain temple cluster in Khajurao in 1885: L to R: a small temple, Parshvanath temple with entrance, Adinath temple, two smaller temples with ruins with three columns. The Shantinath temple, out of the view, would have been on the left

The Jain temples of Khajuraho are a part of the UNESCO World Heritage Site of Khajuraho. They are located in Chhatarpur district, Madhya Pradesh, India, about 175 kilometres southeast of the city of Jhansi.

== History ==
During the Chandela rule, many towns in Bundelkhand, including Khajuraho, were home to large and flourishing Jain communities. At Khajuraho the Jains apparently lived on the east side of town. A number of Jain temples from that period have survived in this part of Khajuraho in various states of preservation. Many Jain inscriptions from the Chandela period can be seen at Khajuraho. All the Jain temples are now enclosed within a modern compound wall constructed in the 19th century, with the exception of the Ghantai temple, when the restoration of the temples was initiated. There is also an archaeological museum where historical Jain artifacts from the chandella period are preserved.

A key difference between the Jain temples and most other Khajuraho temples is that the Jain temples are alive with active praying and worship. Digambar Jain monks still visit from time to time and can be seen meditating, studying or preaching.

== Temples ==
Two of the large temples still stand in a good state of preservation in the original form. The portico of the Adinath temple is a later addition. The enclosed Shantinath temple houses a massive monolithic Shantinath image. It also incorporates at least one other Chandella period temple. To the east of these temples are several small Chandella temples that have been restored using masonry. The temple complex underwent restoration in 1870 AD, when a Gajarath festival was organized by Kanchhedtilal Jain of Nagaur marking a renewal of the site accompanied by installations of new images, as indicated by the inscriptions. The stone structures were stabilized using masonry and the Shantinath temple was constructed incorporating two Chandella period temples.

There is a museum called Sahu Shanti Prasad Jain Samgrahalaya right outside the main compound constructed in 1984 to house sculptures of historical and artistic merit. There is a dharmashala to the south for the pilgrims.

A number of Jain inscriptions from the Chandella period have been found in Khajurao. The earliest is the Samvat 1011 (AD 954) in the Parshvanath Temple, and the last is Samvat 1234 (1177 AD, it is also the last Chandella era inscription in Khajuraho). Pratishtha events must have taken place in Samvat 1205 and 1215 with multiple images of those years. During the time of Kirttivarman (reigned c. 1060–1100 CE), the capital shifted to Mahoba, and Khajuraho declined. The Jain activity resumed around samvat 1915 (1858 AD), when the temples were repaired and installation of new images was restarted.

=== Parshvanath Temple ===
This temple contains an inscription dating from 954 AD by its builder Pahila, mentioning donation of gardens and requesting future generations to safeguard the temple. It mentions Chandella Dhanga as the reigning king.

A well known early magic square is found in this temple. This is referred to as the Chautisa (Thirty-four) Yantra, since each sub-square sums to 34.

=== Adinath Temple ===
The Adinath Jain temple contains an idol with an inscription dated to year 1027 during the rule of Chandella king Madanavarman. The sculpture features Adinatha with an ushnisha on his head and dharmachakra with a small bull figure.

=== Shantinath Temple ===
The Shantinath Temple is a modern composite structure that incorporates sections of several temples and has several shrines. The main section has a 15 feet (4.6 m) idol of Lord Shantinath with an inscription of year 1028(V.S. 1085).

=== Ghantai Temple ===
The Ghantai Temple was built around 960 AD by Chandela kings of Khajuraho. This temple was dedicated to lord Rishabha as Chakreshvari is seen in this temple along with Nine planets and Gomukh yaksha.

== Gallery ==
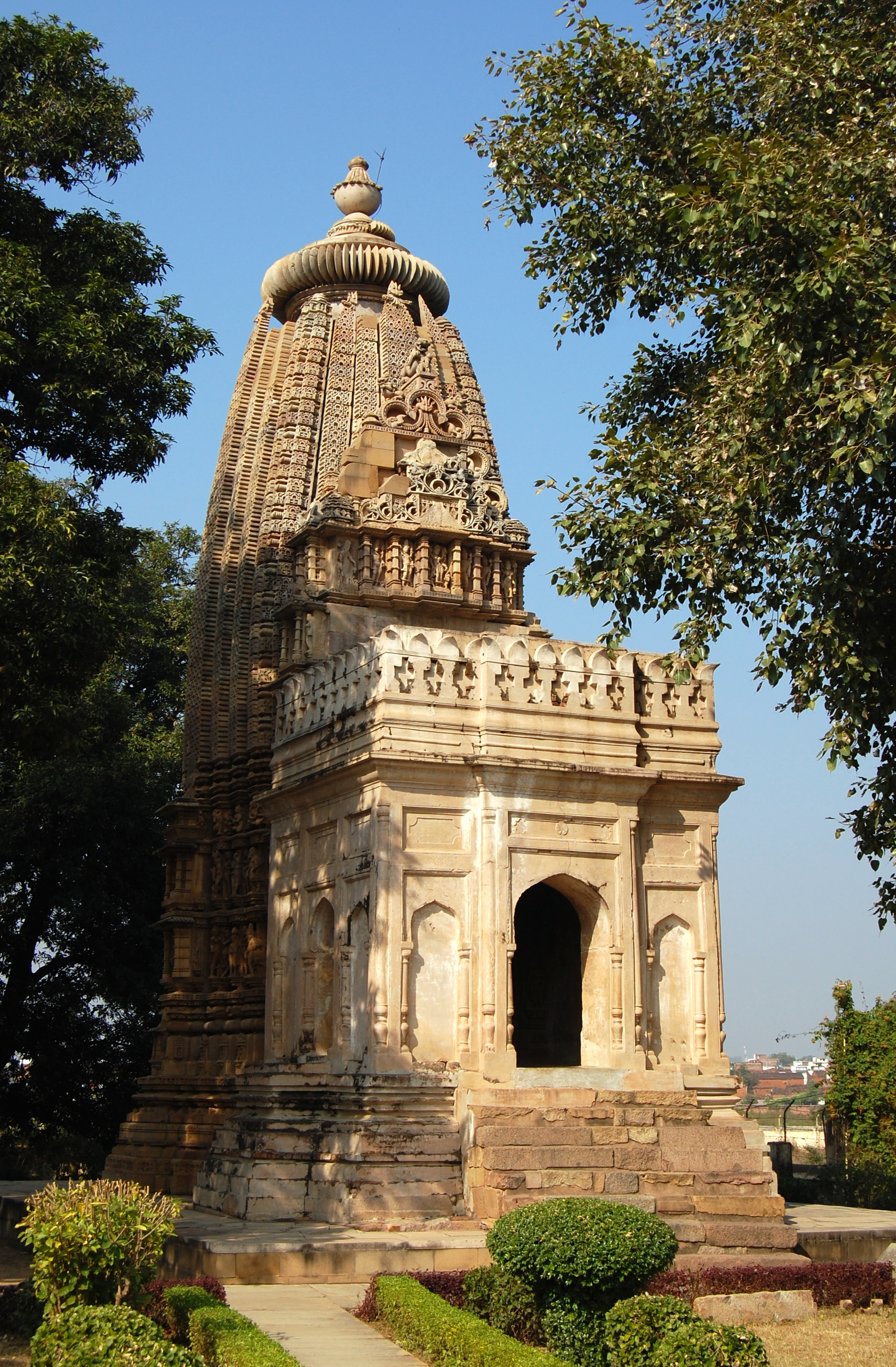
Adinath Temple in Khajuraho

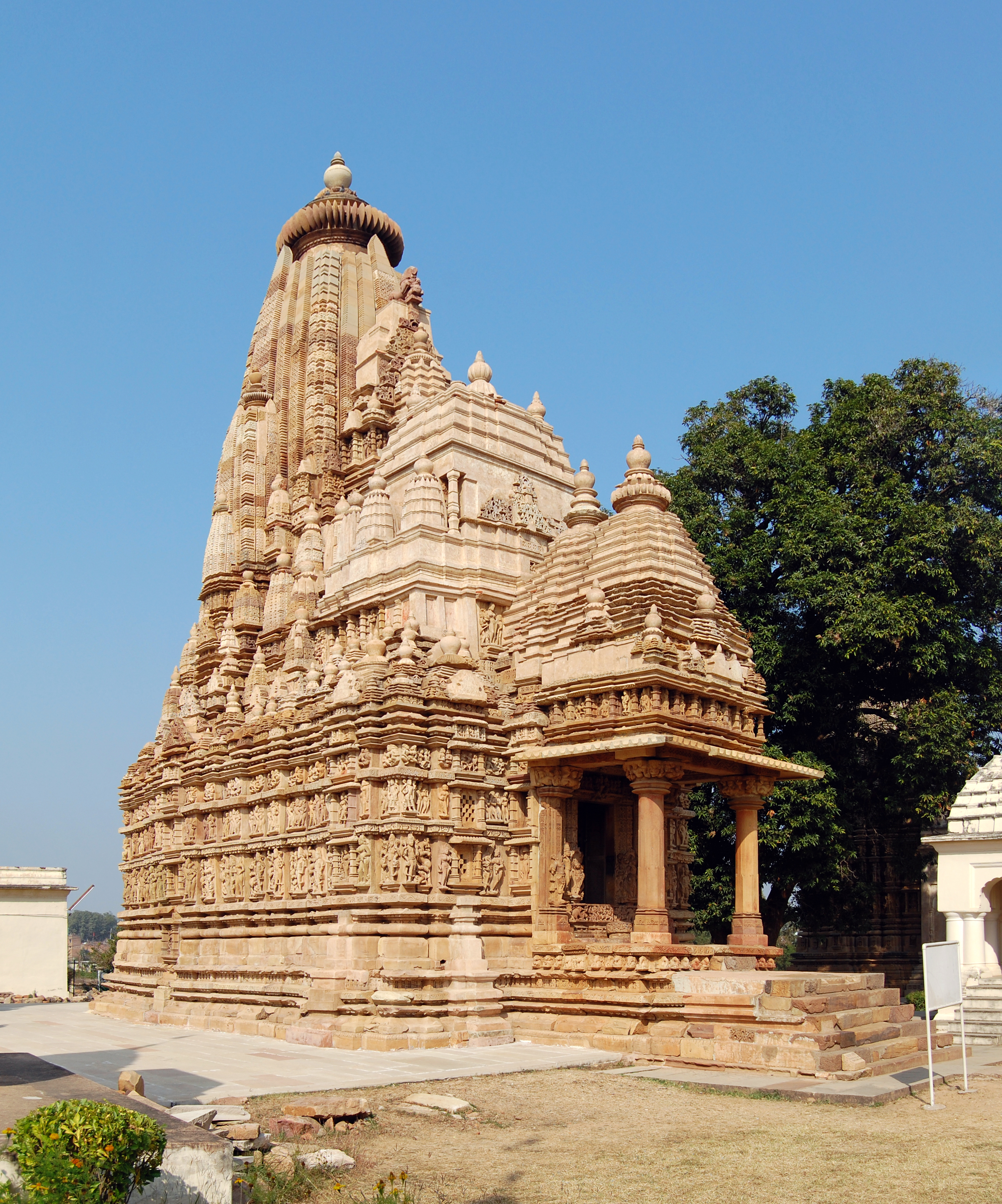
Parshvanath Temple in Khajuraho

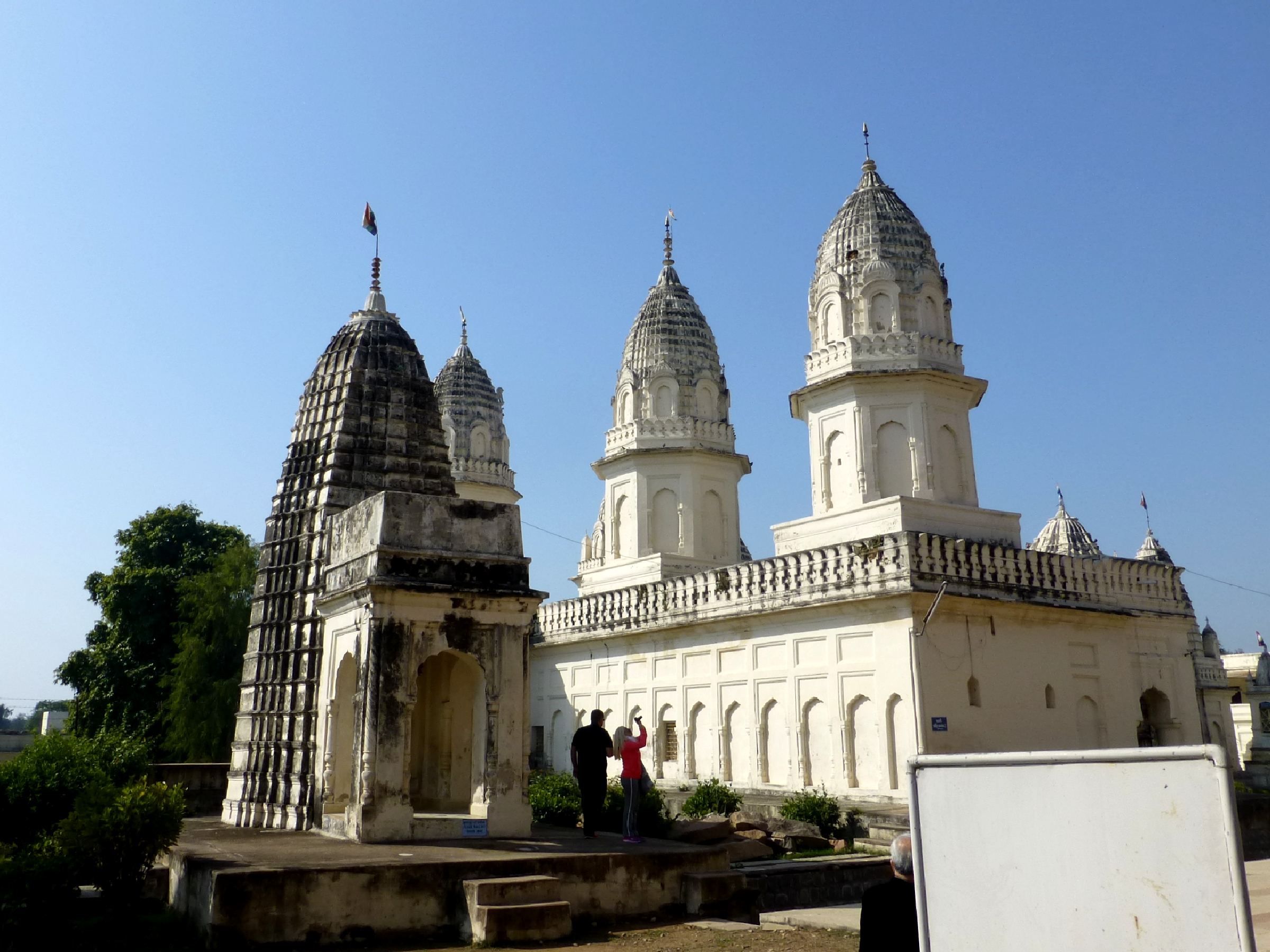
Shantinath Temple in Khajuraho

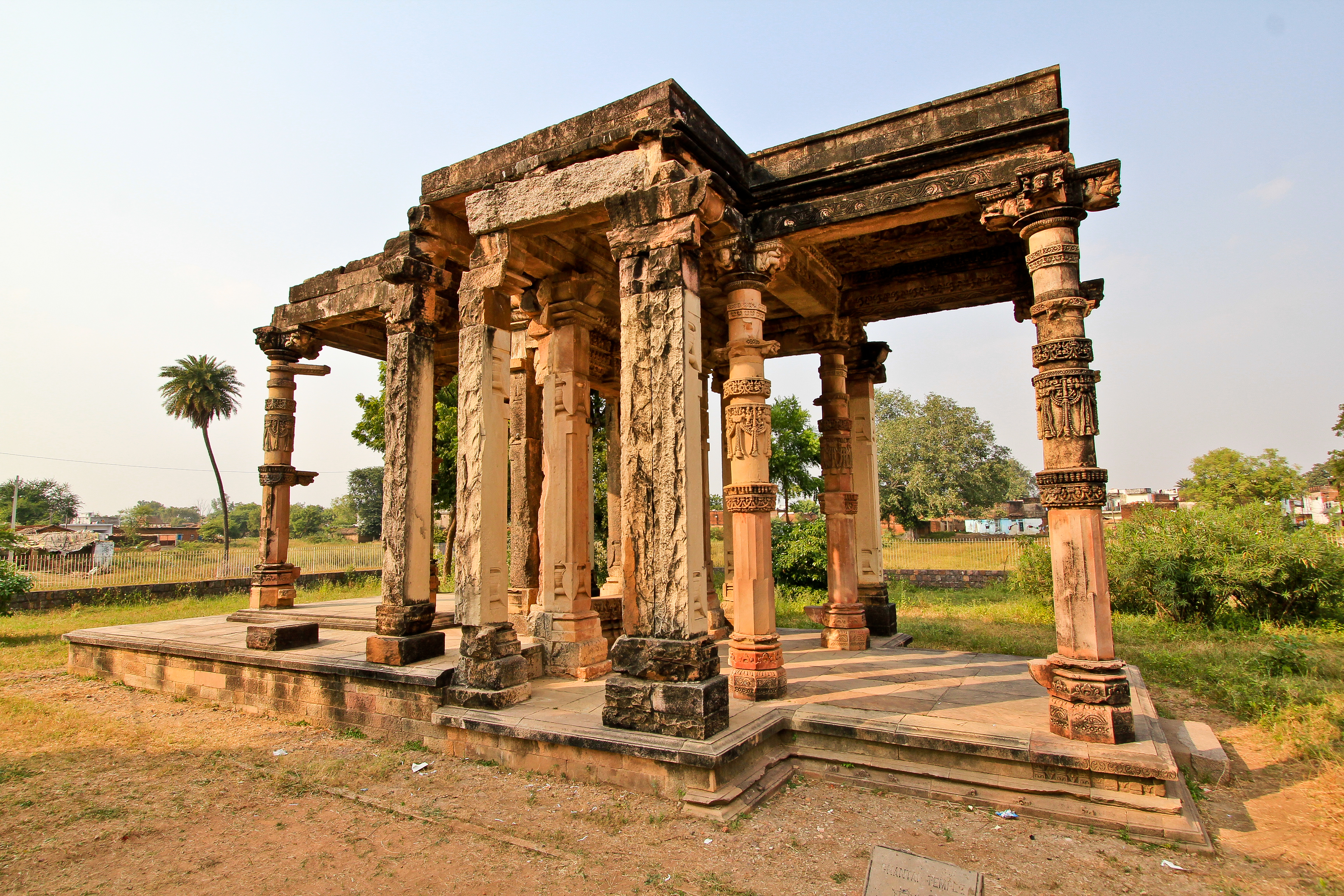
Ruins of Ghantai Temple

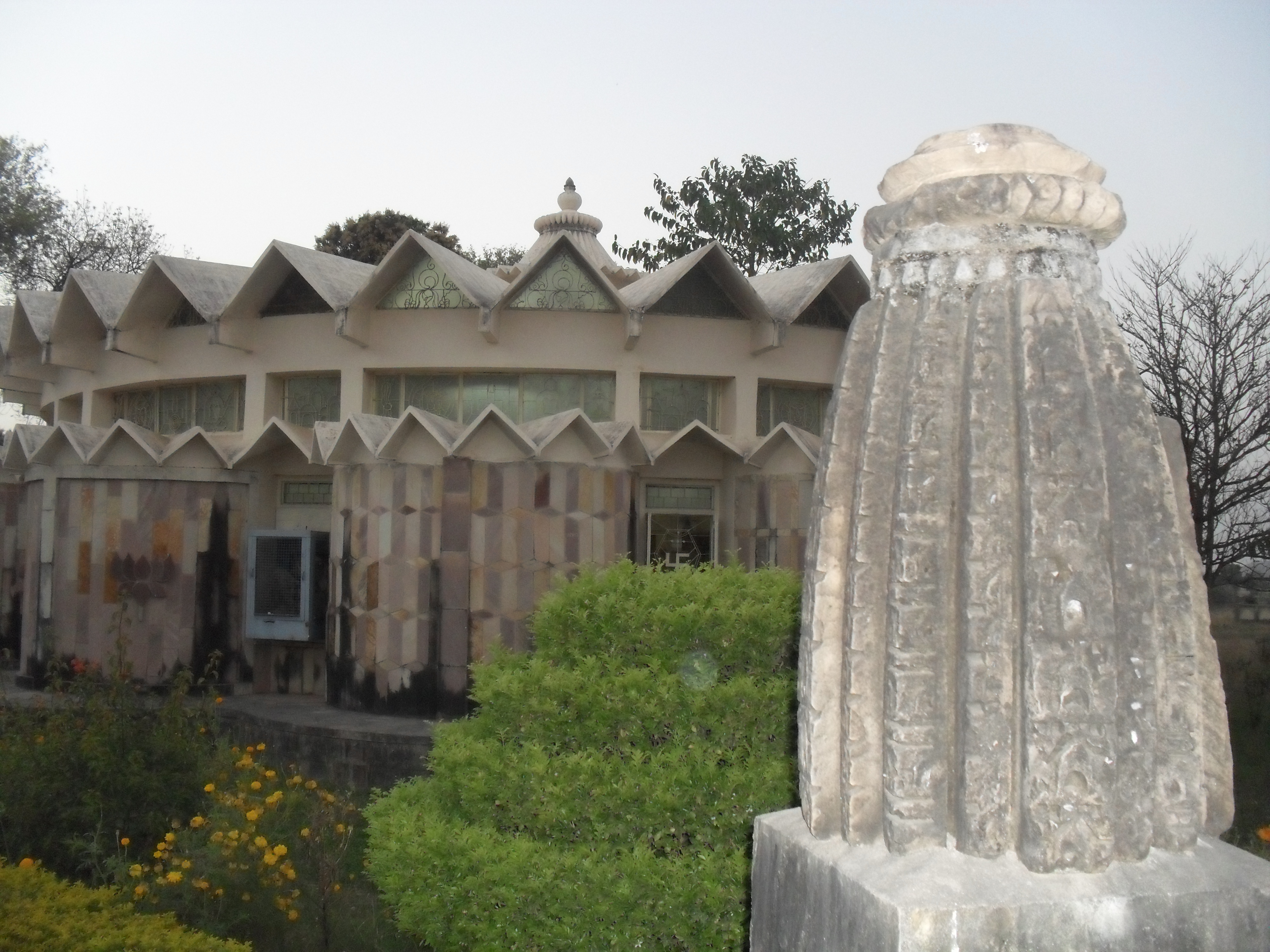
Jain Museum, Khajuraho India

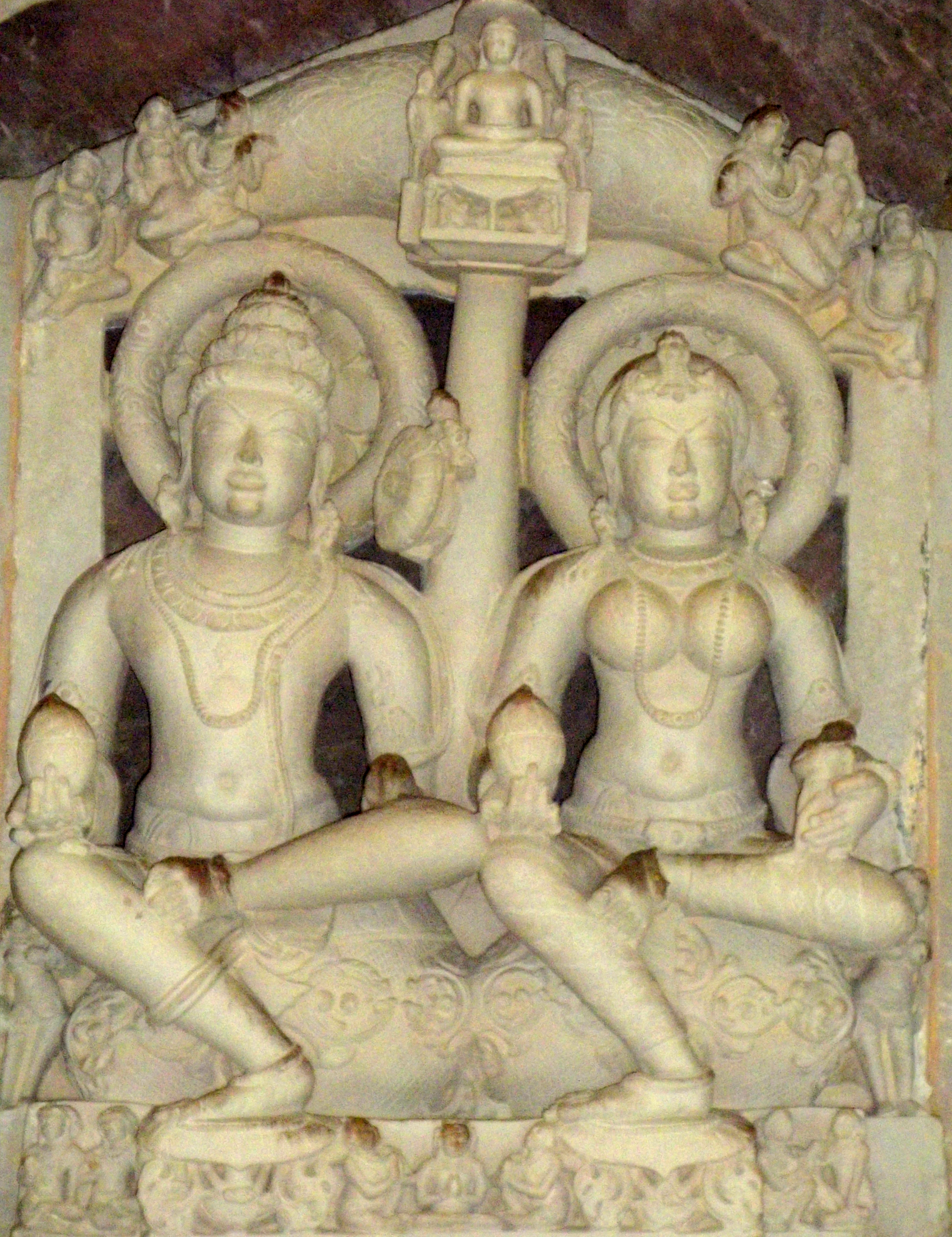
Image of King Nabhi and Mata Marudevi at Jain Museum, Khajuraho(alternatively identified as Sarvanubhuti & Kushmandini).

== See also ==
- Pawagiri Jain temple
- Jainism in Bundelkhand
- Jain sculpture

== Sources ==
- "Santhinatha Temple". Archaeological Survey of India, Bhopal Circle.
- Ali Javid; Tabassum Javeed (2008). World Heritage Monuments and Related Edifices in India. Algora. ISBN 978-0-87586-482-2.
- Umakant Premanand Shah (1987). Jaina Iconography. Abhinav. ISBN 9788170172086.
