= Gahoi =

Central Indian merchant community

Gahoi is a merchant a Vaishya-Bania community in central India.

Gahois are divided into 12 gotras, each gotra is divided into six alls. They have traditionally interdined with the Parwar Jain community of Bundelkhand.

The "Grahapati" family mentioned in the Grahapati Kokkala inscription is believed to be from the same community that is now known as Gahoi. This inscription at Khajuraho, dated Vikram Samvat 1056, Kartika (1000–1001 AD), is the earliest known reference to the Grahapati family. Unlike all other Chandella-era Grahapati inscriptions which are Jain, this refers to a Shiva temple, although Verse 3 suggests that the builder also worshipped Jinas. An inscription is of Vikram samvat 1011 mentioning Pahilla, regarded to have been a Grahapati, who built a Jain temple during the reign of Dhanga at Khajuraho. This temple is among those that still exist at Khajuraho.

A bronze Jain Altarpiece with Parshvanatha, Shantinatha, and Vasupujiya is preserved in the Los Angeles County Museum of Art. It was installed by Sadhu Sandhan, son of Kuntha, of Grahapati family in Vikram 1121 (1178 AD).

== Notable people ==
- Maithili Sharan Gupt, a Hindi poet
- Ashutosh Rana, Bollywood Actor

== See also ==
- Beejamandal
- Golapurva
