= Panch Kalyanaka Pratishtha Mahotsava =

Panch Kalyanaka Pratishtha Mahotsava is a traditional Jain ceremony that consecrates one or more Jain Tirthankara icons with celebration of Panch Kalyanaka (five auspicious events). The ceremony is generally held when new Jain temple is erected or new idols are installed in temples. 5 names of panch kalyanak are Chyavan (conception) Janma (birth) Diksha (renunciation) Keval Gyan (omniscience) Moksha (liberation)

== Panch Kalyanaka ==
Gajrath chariot in Tada, Bundelkhand

The five kalyanakas are the five major events associated with a Tirthankara are:

1. Chyavan (conception)
2. Janma (birth)
3. Diksha (renunciation)
4. Keval Gyan (omniscience)
5. Moksha (liberation)

These events are celebrated in relation to icons of Tirthankaras which is called Pratishtha. After the pratishtha the statue represents the Tirthankara, and becomes a worshippable object.

A pratishtha must be authorised by an acknowledged leader of the sangha, an Acharya or a Bhattaraka, or a representative (pratishthacharya), who can recite the sacred suri-mantra to mark the final step in the installation ceremony. The Śvetāmbara sect requires a ceremony called anjana-shalaka. Once an idol is fully installed, it must be worshipped daily.

The Bhattaraka Devendrakeerti of Humbaj is the only Bhattaraka who has participated in the installations in overseas countries including USA, Canada and Australia.

In Bundelkhand region, a panch-kalyanak pratishtha is accompanied by a gaj rath (chariot drawn by elephants) procession.

== See also ==
- Jainism
- Tirthankara
