= Golapurva =

Golapurva is an ancient Digambar Jain community from the Bundelkhand region of Madhya Pradesh.

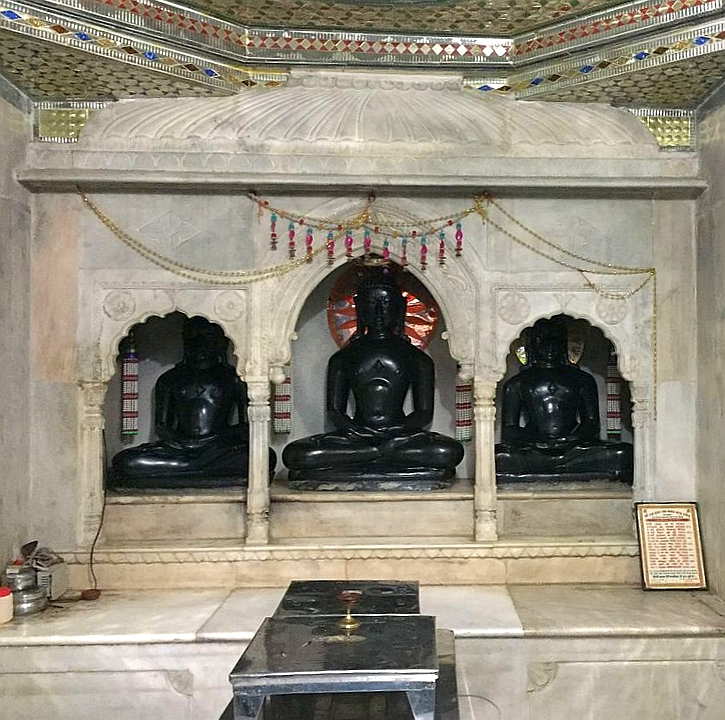
Paporaji idols of Lord Adinath belonging to 1145(VS 1202) in the underground chamber installed by families of Sahu Galle and Sahu Tuda of Golapurva anvaya

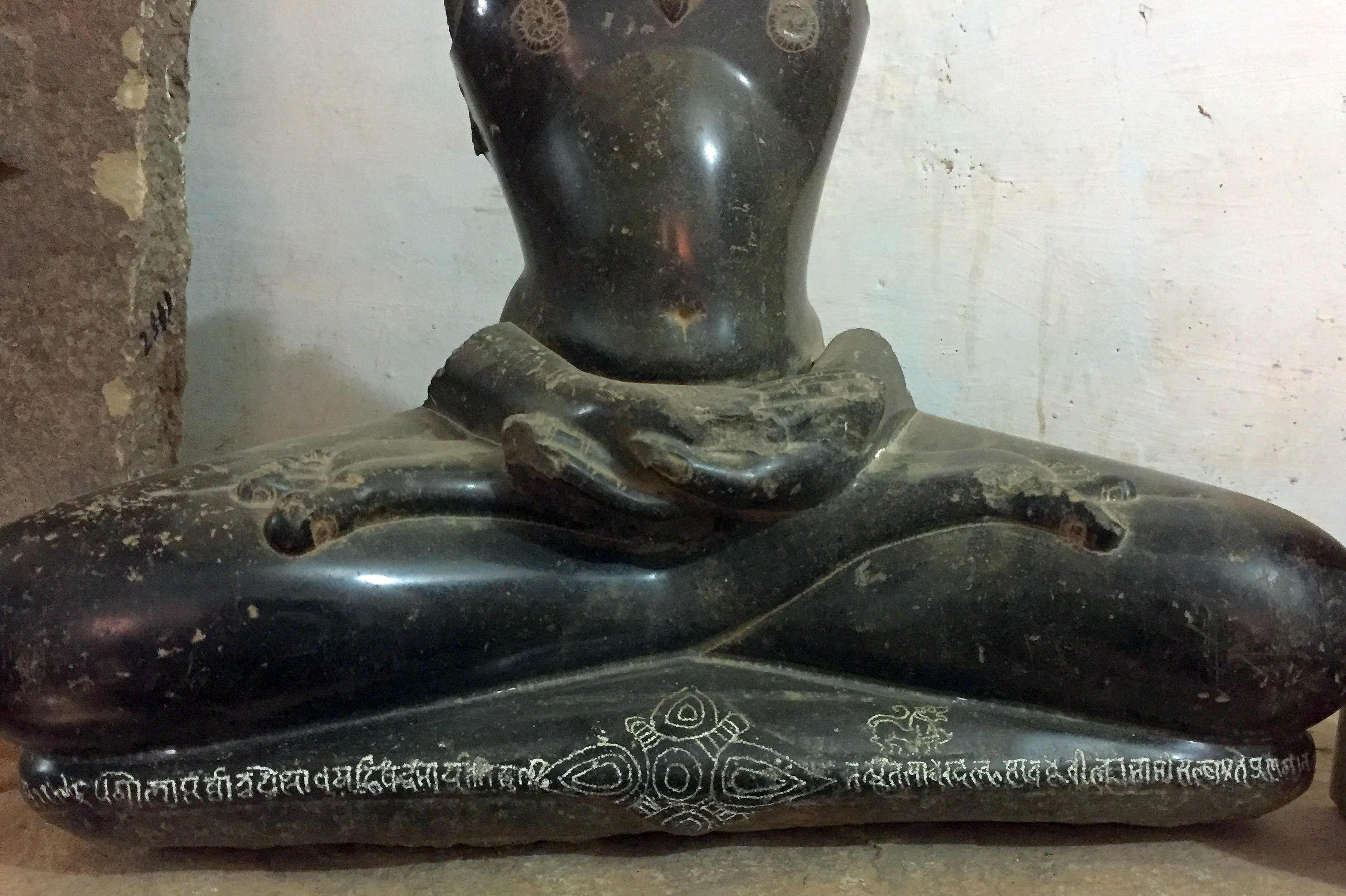
Chandella period sculpture of 1138 AD at Navagarh with inscription mentioning Golapurva Mahichandra

== History ==
Jainism had a continuous presence in the Bundelkhand region since antiquity. Jainism was flourishing during the Gupta period at Vidisha region. The Durjanpur idols installed during the rule of Ramagupta date to about 365 AD. The Udaigiri cave Parshvanath inscription mentioning the lineage of Bhadranvaya is dated to 425 AD. The great Shantinath temple at Deogarh was built before 862 CE, suggesting existence of a prosperous Jain community in this region.

A number of Chandella-period inscriptions mentioning the Golapurva community have been found. These include Jagatsagar Lake (now in Dhubela museum) (Sam. 1119 i.e. 1062 AD), Urdamau (Sam. 1149, 1171 i.e. CE 1092 and 1114), Bahuriband (1125 AD), Mau (sam 1199), Jatara (Sam 1199), Aharji (sam 1202), Chhatarpur (sam. 1202), Paporaji (sam 1202), Mau (sam 1203), Navagarh (sam 1195, 1203), Mahoba (sam. 1219) etc. With the exception of Bahoriband, all the oldest inscriptions have been found in the vicinity of the Dhasan River (Sanskrit Dasharna).

संवत १०..फाल्गुन वदि ९ सोमे श्रीमद गयाकर्णदेव विजयराज्ये राष्ट्रकूटकुलोद्भव महासमन्ताधिपति श्रीमद् गोल्हणदेवस्य प्रवर्धमानस्य श्रीमद् गोल्लापूर्वाम्नाये वेल्लप्रभाटिकायामुरुकृताम्नाये तर्कतार्किक चूडामणि श्रीमन् माधवनन्दिनानुगृहीतः तस्साधु श्री सर्व्वधरः तस्य पुत्र महाभोज धर्म्मदानाध्ययनरतः तेनेदं कारितं रम्यम शान्तिनाथस्य मन्दिरं

— The Bahuriband Inscription 1125 CE

The towns historically connected with the Golapurva community are in Chhatarpur, Tikamgarh, Sagar and Damoh districts in Madhya Pradesh and Lalitpur district in Uttar Pradesh. This region still has a large population of Golapurvas,

According to Vardhamana Purana of Navalsah Chanderia, the Golapurvas originated from a place termed Goelgarh. It is also the view of Pt. Nathuram Premi and Pt. Munnalal Randheliya that the community originated from a place termed Golla. It has been identified as Gwalior or a town Golapur in Bundelkhand region, or a region termed Golladesh mentioned in a Shravanabelagola inscription. There exists two Jain communities named Golalare (Golarade in Sanskrit) and Golsinghare in Bhind/Itawa region who might be related. There is also a Brahmin community named Golapurab who are a branch of the Sanadhya Brahmins in Agra region and are stated to have originated from Gola village in Sanadhya Samhia (गोलाग्रामगताः केचित् गोलापूर्वाः).

== Legends ==
A legendary account of the origin is given in Navalsah Chanderia's "Vardhamana Purana" written in 1769 AD. In this account the poet gives a history of the Golapurvas, tracing his own descent, his ancestor who lived at Chanderi in remote antiquity, gajaratha pratishta by his ancestors in 1634 AD at Bhelsi, and settlement of his ancestors at Khataura, where he was born. The temple built by his ancestors at Bhelsi still exists.

Navalsah Chanderia mentions that Lord Adinath visited at a place named "Goyalgarh", where the local residents took the shravaka vratas from him.

There is a tradition that the Golapurvas are descendants of the ancient Ikshvaku clan. The inscription is at Saurai of Sam. 1864 states that the builder of the temple Singhahi Mohandas belonged to Ikshvaku vamsha, gotra Padmavati of the Golapurva community and baink Chanderia. It is also mentioned in some of the inscriptions at Nainagiri in Madhya Pradesh.

== Notable people ==
- Kshullaka Chidananda, founder of 30 schools in Bundelkhand (Sam. 1958-1970 AD).
- Pandit Balachandra Shastri, Early modern Jain Scholar, remembered for his work on the Satkhandāgama, Kasāyapāhuda and Jaina Laksanavali (1905–1985).
- Muni Kshamasagar, author and poet
- Sahityacharya Pandit Dr. Pannalal Jain, editor of widely quoted classical Jain texts
- Niraj Jain, Satna, Archeologist, historian, poet, author of many books related to Jain philosophy.

== See also ==
- Jainism in Bundelkhand
