= Jaiswal Jain =

Religious Group in India

Location of Dubkund, historical Jaiswal center

Jaiswal Jains are one of the Jain communities of northern India. They are mainly located in the Gwalior/Agra region. The term "Jaiswal" indicated as being residents of a place named Jayas or Jais.

Some authors have identified Jais with Jais in Raebareli district. A legend identifies it as Jaisalmer. However, there are documented mentions of Jaiswal Jains prior to the settlement of Jaisalmer which was founded in 1156 by Rawal Jaisal. The famous Dubkund Jain inscription of 1088 AD is the earliest mention of the Jayas town. The Apabhraṃśa Jain poet Lakshmana composed the Jinadatta Charitra in sam. 1275 and Anuvaya Rayana Payiiva in sam. 1313, both at Tihuangiri (Tribhubangiri) near Bayana. Thus the place Jayas must have been in the vicinity of Gwalior region. Several of the cave temples on the sides of the Gwalior Fort hill have inscriptions mentioning that they were constructed by Jaiswals. Some of the patrons of poet Raidhu in Gwalior were Jaiswal.

== Prominent Jaiswal Jains ==
- Poet Bulakhichand, author of Vachankosha in sam. 1707
- Dr. Nemichandra Shastri Jyotishacharya 1922-1974
- Ravindra Jain, poet and music director

== See also ==
- Jain community
