= Vijayvargiya =

Trading community in India

Vijayvargiya (also Vijayvargia, Vijayvergiya, Vijaywargiya, Vijayvergia, Vijay) is a merchant or (Vaishya-Baniya) community mainly from Rajasthan and Madhya Pradesh.

According to tradition, it originated from the historical Khandela town in northern Rajasthan. Maheshwaris and Khandelwal communities also trace their origin to Khandela.

They mainly live in Rajasthan ( in Jodhpur, Tonk, Bharatpur, Jaipur, Ajmer, Bhilwara, Chittaurgarh, Udaipur, Kota and Bikaner districts) and western Madhya Pradesh ( in Rajgarh, Nimach, Mandsour, Ratlam, Indore, Guna, Bhopal and also in Gwalior districts) . They are also located at Kolkata, Mumbai, Hyderabad, Agra, Ahmedabad, Vadodara, Surat, Pune, Delhi, Faridabad, Ballabgarh, Chennai, Chandigarh, Bangalore, Nagpur, Gurgaon, Ranchi, Jhansi, America. They are mainly Vaishanava(Vaishya). The Ram Snehi sect was founded by Swami Ram Charan (1718–1798) at Shahpura, Bhilwara by establishing Ramdwara was born in this community.

Vijayvargias’ are basically Vaishnava, but there are isolated examples of them being Shaivas also. In the field of spiritualism also Vijayvargias’ are known to have been blessed by the ‘Ramsnehi Sect’; Swami Shri Ramacharan ji Maharaj was its founder. According to a colophon of Pandva Purana of AD 1545 and a Shivpuri inscription of 1646 AD, some of them have been Jain and were regarded a branch of Saraogi Jains.

== See also ==
- Ram Charan Maharaj
- Ramdwara
- Shahpura, Bhilwara
