= Ram Jan =

First acharya of the Ramsnehi Sampradaya

Ram Jan was the first acharya of the Ramsnehi Sampradaya, after the foremost guru Ram Charan Maharaj. He formalized the sampradaya on the principles given by his guru.

Ram Jan also commissioned the construction of the Ram Niwas Dham, the main Ramdwara, situated at Shahpura, Rajasthan, which is the samadhi of Ram Charan Maharaj. Swami Ram Jan Maharaj was also responsible for editing and collating the poetical-spiritual speeches of Ram Charan Maharaj into the form of a giant book, the Vaani Ji.

== See also ==
- Ram Charan Maharaj
- Shahpura, Bhilwara
- Ram Kishor
- Ram Dayal
