= Khandelwal =

Khandelwal may refer to:

- Of, from or related to Khandela, a city in Rajasthan, India
  - Khandelwal (surname), Indian toponymic surname from Khandela
  - Khandelwal communities
    - Khandelwal Vaishya, a Vaishnava Vaishya trading community originally from Khandela
    - Khandelwal Jain or Sarawagi, a major Jain community originally from Khandela
