= Shanti-Sthala =

Samadhi in Rajasthan

Shanti-Sthala is the samadhi of the 13th head of Ramsnehi Sampradaya, Swami Ji Shri Ramkishorji Maharaj. It is located in Ramniwas Dham, Shahpura, Bhilwara. On entering Ram Niwas Dham, it is situated around 50 metres to the left of Ram Charan Dwar. It is made of yellow limestone sourced from Jaisalmer. It is surrounded by a green courtyard.

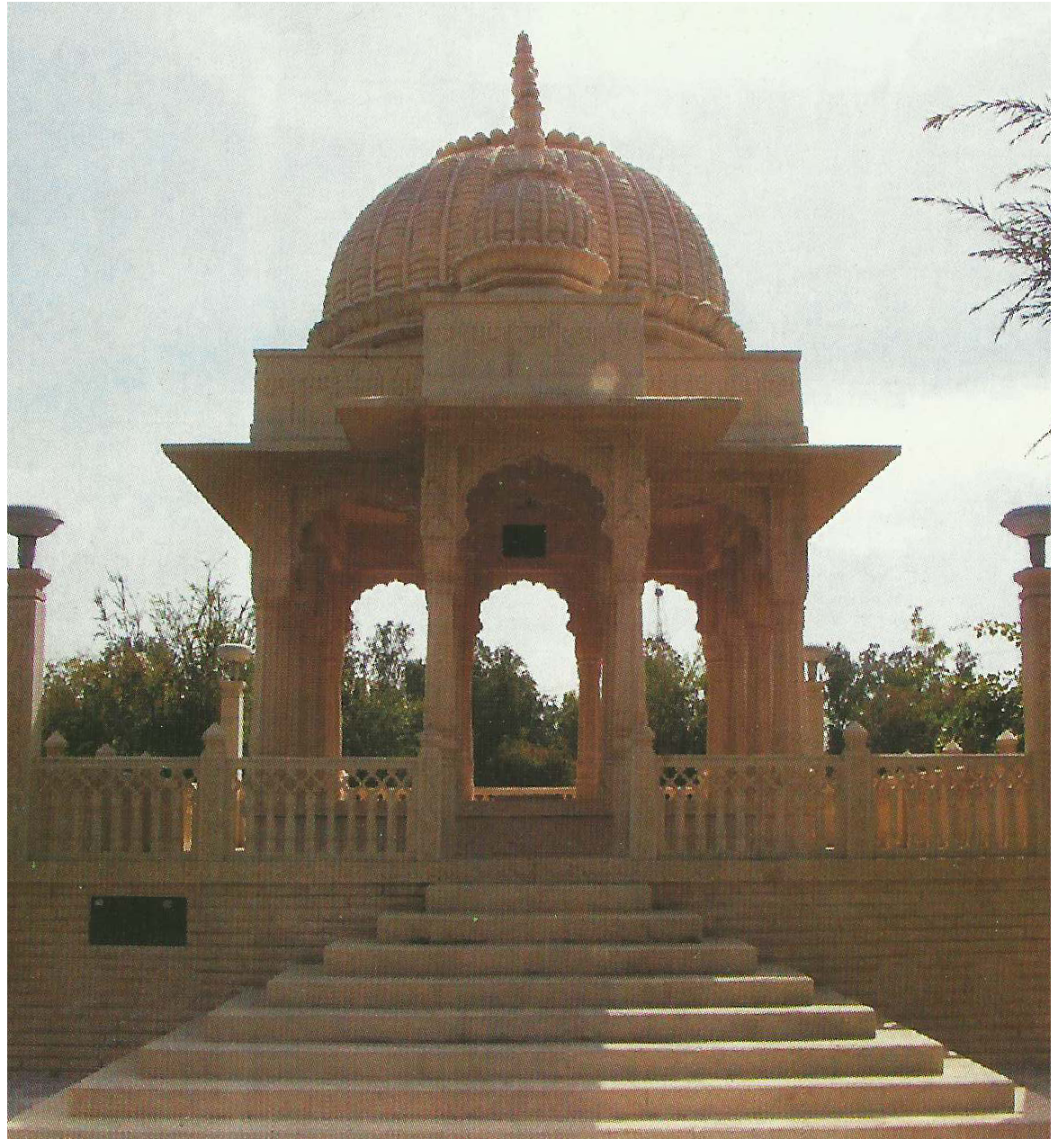
Shanti-Sthala

The Indira Gandhi National Centre for the Arts mentions the Shanti Sthala:

"…it is extraordinarily beautiful with great carvings and decoration. It is a chhatri composed of 12 pillars and on elaborated carved dome. The sthal is fronted with right of steps. The porch has an extended verandah. The dowar of the dome has relief recessed niches. The finial is beautiful and topped with Kalash."

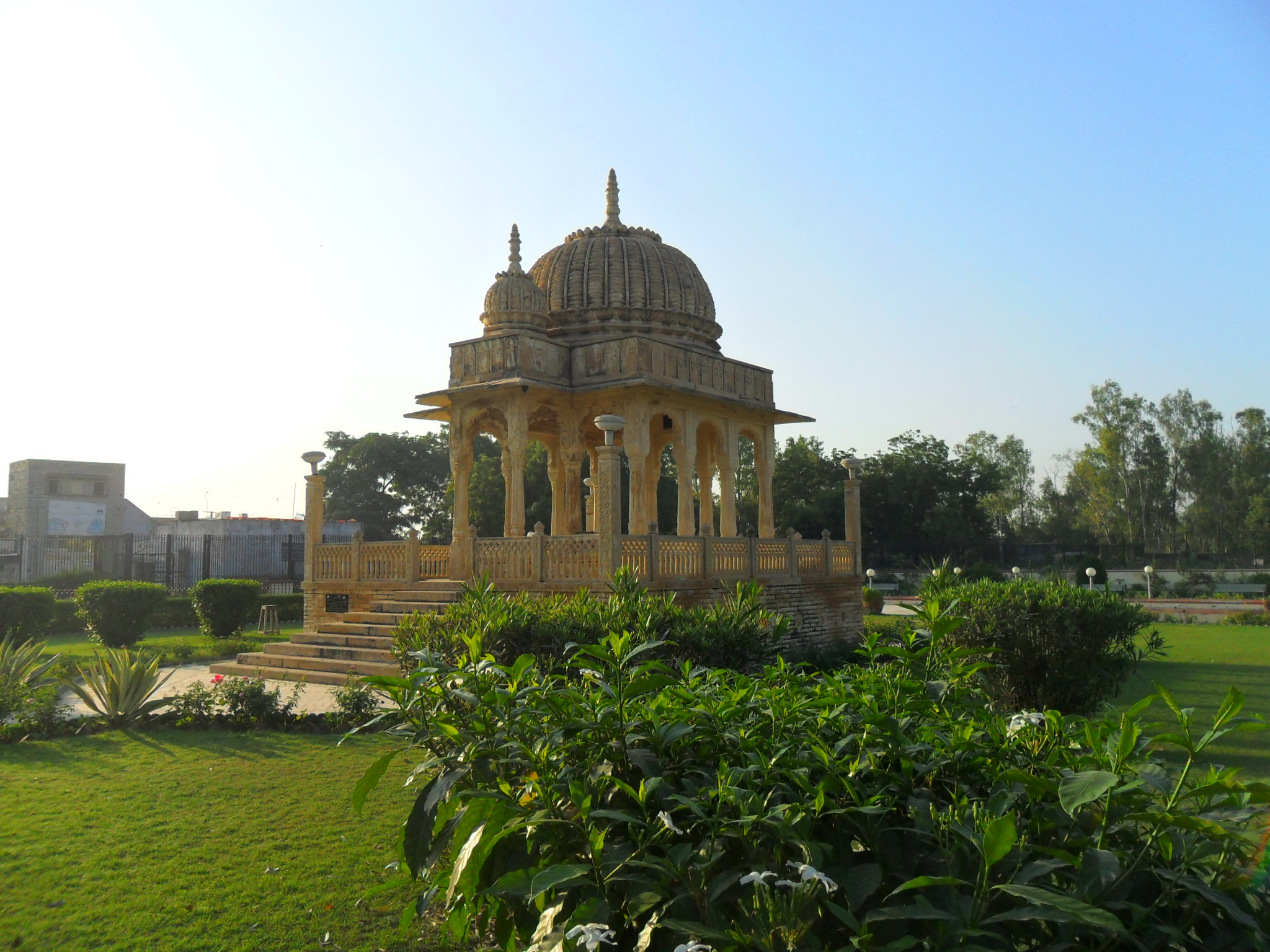
Shanti-Sthala (Alternate view)

== See also ==
- Ram Charan Maharaj
- Shahpura, Bhilwara
- Ram Kishor Ji Maharaj
- Ramdwara
- Sri Ram Snehi Bhaskar Magazine
