= Nancy Loudon =

Scottish gynaecologist (1926–2009)

Nancy Beaton Loudon OBE FRCPE FFSRH
- Born: Nancy Mann; 28 February 1926; Black Isle, Ross and Cromarty, Scotland
- Died: 20 February 2009 (aged 82); Edinburgh, Scotland
- Education: University of Edinburgh
- Occupations: physician, gynaecologist
- Known for: establishing family planning clinics
- Relatives: John Loudon (husband)
- Medical career
- Sub-specialties: women's health, birth control
- Research: contraception
- Notable works: Handbook of Family Planning (1985)

Nancy Beaton Loudon OBE FRCPE (née Mann; 28 February 1926 – 20 February 2009) was a Scottish gynaecologist. She devoted her professional life to pioneering, and ensuring provision of family planning and well woman services. She was a fore-runner in the specialty of 'community gynaecology'.

== Early life and education ==
Nancy Mann was born at Killen on 28 February 1926, the eldest daughter of Helen and Alec J. Mann. Her father was a prominent farmer on the Black Isle, and a county councillor. Loudon showed her academic potential early by becoming Dux of Fortrose Academy in her final year of school. She began her medical studies at the Medical School of the University of Edinburgh in 1944, during war-time, graduating in 1949. She was one of only a small number of students each year who obtained their medical degree 'with honours'.

== Career and research ==
After graduation she worked as a registrar specialising in obstetrics and gynaecology at Simpson's maternity hospital, Edinburgh, under the supervision of Professor Robert James Kellar. When she became engaged to marry fellow gynaecologist, John Loudon, Kellar declared that there was no place for a married woman in obstetrics and she was forced to resign her post. Two years later, John Loudon was to accept the registrar post under Professor Kellar that Loudon had been forced to resign.

Loudon's return to medical practice was a weekly session in the Edinburgh Mothers' Welfare clinic, a family planning clinic. This clinic, the first in Edinburgh, was run on a voluntary basis by two doctors, Maeve Marwick and Alexandra Lothian.

Initially, the clinic had spartan premises - an old shop, possessing a cold tap only, and with the waiting room furnished with wooden benches. However, in 1957 a bequest of £2,000 allowed the purchase of premises in Dean Terrace, a Georgian town house carefully chosen for its secluded location. The clinic remained there for over 50 years, until it moved to Chalmers Community Clinic in Lauriston Place, at that point becoming a combined family planning, well woman and sexual and reproductive health clinic.

Birth control 'need', and word-of-mouth, meant local women flocked to the newly established clinic in Dean Terrace, and it became a groundbreaking centre for the new methods of contraception that were becoming available. Loudon took over as Principal Medical Officer in 1972, and at that time the clinic was Branch 50 of the Family Planning Association (FPA). The clinic was later subsumed into Lothian Health Board.

At the Dean Terrace clinic, Loudon worked with a team during a period of expansion in family planning services despite ongoing challenges. The clinic expanded its services to include well-woman screening, vasectomy, sexual problems clinics, and workplace screening in local factories. She also established the Lothian Abortion Referral Service, which was intended to improve the management of women seeking abortion by reducing delays.

She pursued academic medical interests, and held a lectureship in the Department of Obstetrics and Gynaecology at the University of Edinburgh. She was involved in research on contraception, in particular, steroid hormones, and her research work led to over 70 scientific publications. In 1985 she wrote a textbook, The Handbook of Family Planning, which has continued as a popular text for doctors working in the field - the fifth edition, edited by University of Edinburgh colleagues including Professor Anna Glasier, was published shortly before she died.

She was chairperson of the UK National Association of Family Planning Doctors, and held many other national medical roles. She was not afraid to challenge the establishment when the needs of women were threatened. In her time, the medical specialty of Family Planning has become firmly established in the UK, now known as the Faculty of Sexual and Reproductive Healthcare.

Loudon retired in 1988.

== Awards and honours ==
Following retirement, she was awarded the William Y Darling Bequest by Edinburgh District Council for Good Citizenship, by a unanimous committee vote. Subsequently, she was elected a fellow of the Royal College of Physicians of Edinburgh, and her contribution to medicine was marked with an OBE in 1992.

== Personal life ==
Loudon was supported throughout her professional life by her husband, John Loudon, retired consultant obstetrician and gynaecologist. She had two sons and by 2009 had six grandchildren. She died 20 February 2009.

== Selected works ==
- Loudon, Nancy; Newton Richard John (1985). Handbook of Family Planning. Churchill Livingstone.
