= Mahesh Navami =

Biggest festival of the Maheshwari community

- Type: Maheshwari
- Significance: Origin Day of Maheshwari Community
- Date: Jyeshtha Shukla Navami
- Related to: Lord Shiva, Goddess Parvati

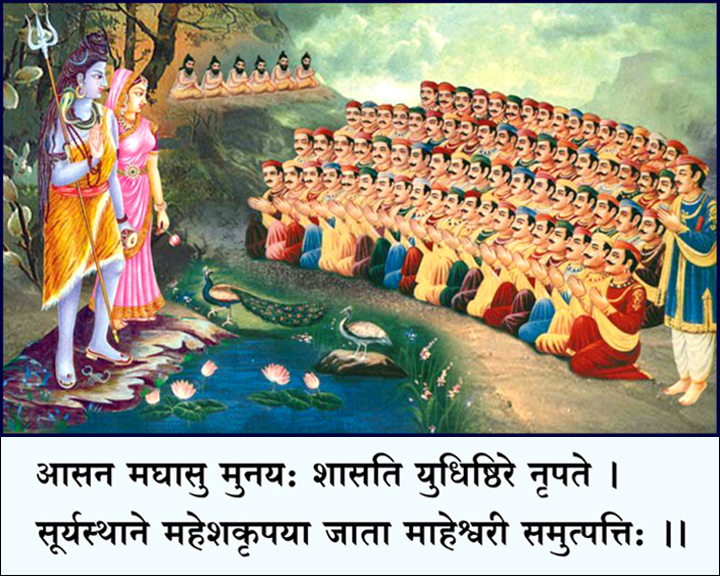
Picture of the origin of Maheshwari Community by Lord Maheshji (Devadhidev Shiva) and Goddess Parvati

Mahesh Navami (Devanāgarī: महेश नवमी) is a Hindu festival dedicated to Lord Shiva, celebrated primarily by the Maheshwari community as the day of their divine origin. It falls on the ninth day (Navami) of the Shukla Paksha (waxing phase) in the Hindu month of Jyeshtha (May-June).

Religious and cultural events are performed on this day. This festival reveals complete devotion and faith to Lord Mahesha and Goddess Parvati. It is the most important day in all this community people where several cultural events and rallies are arranged together to make unity and dignity amongst all. The main motto is to spread message of service, sacrifice, and righteousness.

== Legend ==
There are many legends associated with Mahesh Navami. One popular legends narrates that once a group of hunters entered a sage's ashram and disturbed its peace. Angered by their actions, Lord Shiva cursed them to turn into stones. The hunters' wives performed penance and prayed to Shiva for mercy. Moved by their devotion, Shiva agreed to lift the curse on the condition that the hunters abandon their violent profession and take up a peaceful occupation. Accepting this, the hunters became traders and came to be known as the Maheshwari community, with Lord Shiva regarded as their divine ancestor.
