= ICBP =

ICBP may refer to:

- International Centre for Birds of Prey
- International Consortium of British Pensioners, a lobby group for frozen state pensions
- International Council for Bird Preservation, now BirdLife International
