= Narendra Patel, Baron Patel =

British obstetrician and life peer

The Right Honourable The Lord Patel KT FMedSci FRSE
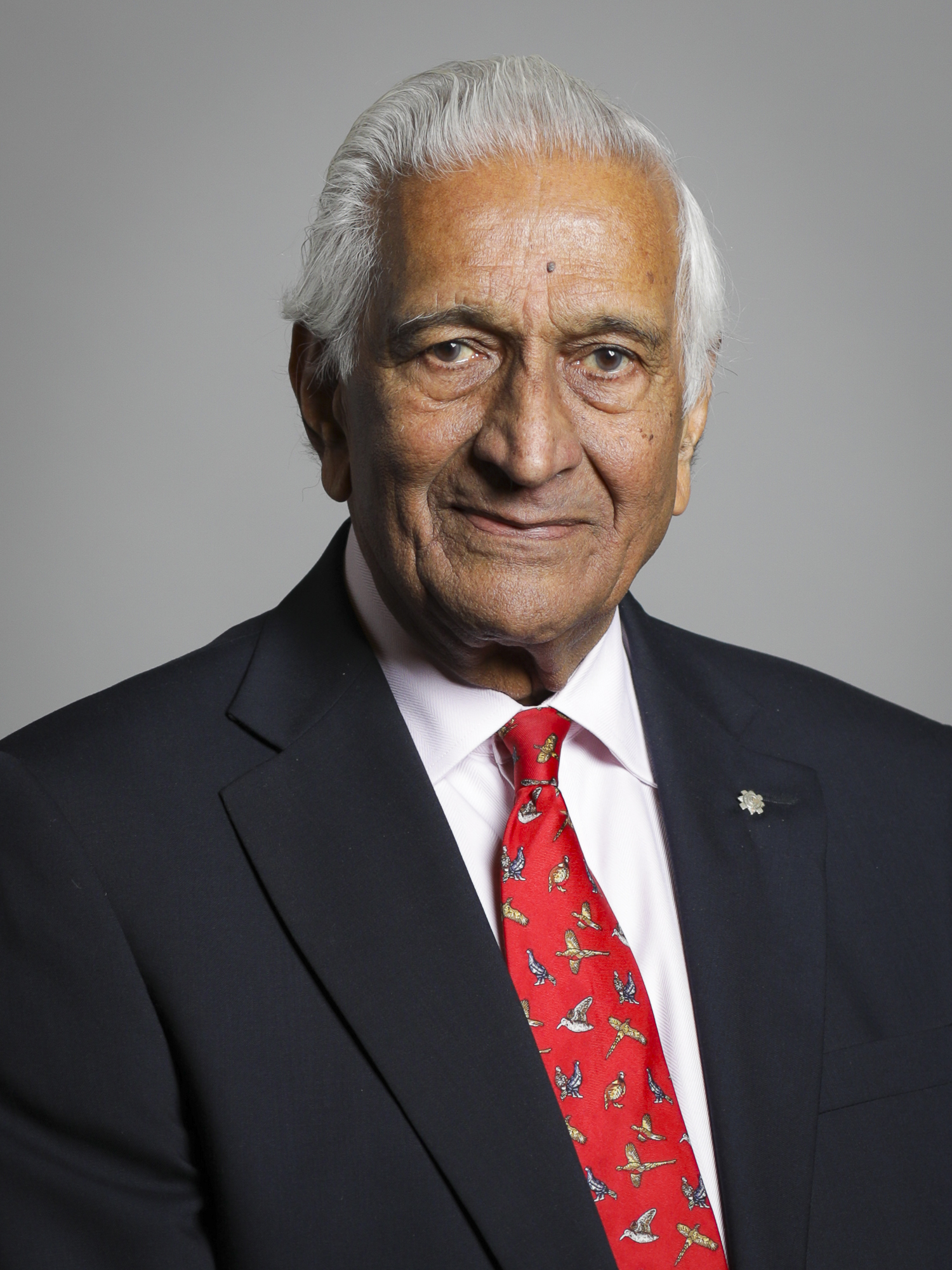

Chancellor of the University of Dundee
- In office 2006–2017
- Preceded by: Sir James Black
- Succeeded by: Dame Jocelyn Bell Burnell

Member of the House of Lords
- Lord Temporal
- Life peerage 1 March 1999

Personal details
- Born: 11 May 1938 (age 88) Lindi, Tanganyika (now Tanzania)
- Party: None (crossbencher)
- Spouse: Helen Dally
- Education: University of St Andrews (Queen's College, now University of Dundee)
- Profession: Obstetrician

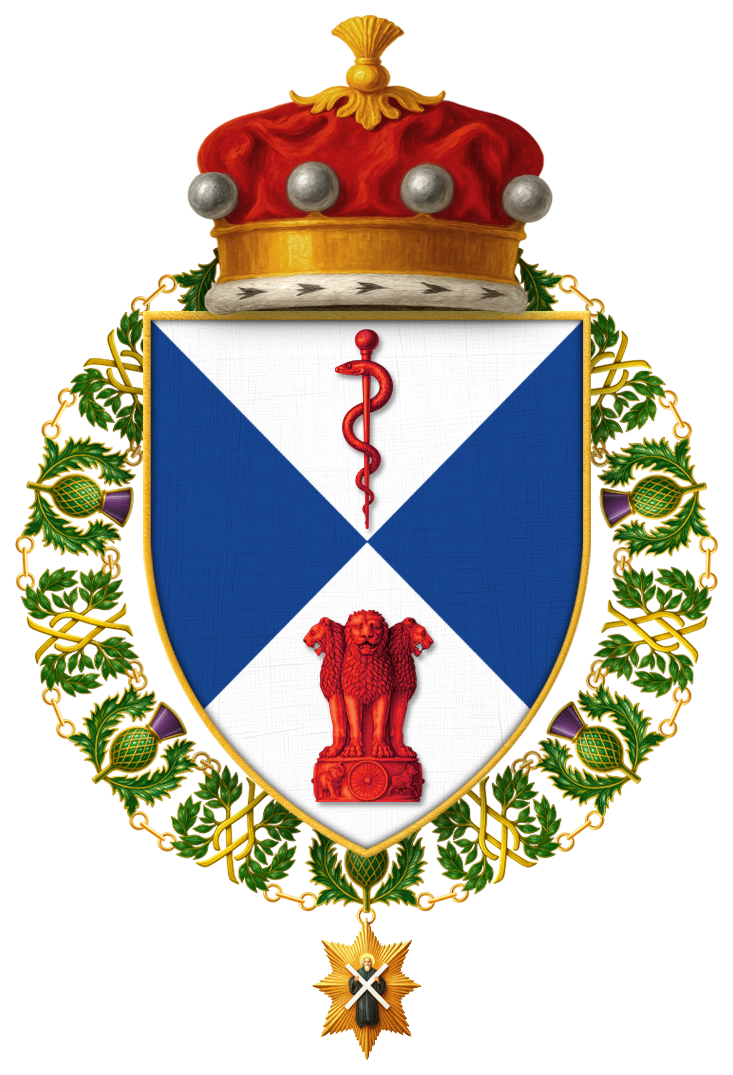
Shield of Arms of Narendra Babubhai Patel, Baron Patel, KT, FMedSci, FRSE

Narendra Babubhai Patel, Baron Patel (born 11 May 1938) is a Tanzanian-British obstetrician and crossbench life peer. He served as president of the Royal College of Obstetricians and Gynaecologists from 1995 to 1998 and as Chancellor of the University of Dundee from 2006 to 2017.

== Early life ==
Patel was born in Lindi, Tanganyika (now Tanzania), on 11 May 1938, of Indian Gujarati emigrants and studied medicine at Queen's College, University of St Andrews, (now the University of Dundee) graduating in 1964. He worked for more than thirty years at Dundee's Ninewells Hospital, becoming a consultant obstetrician in 1974. Patel's clinical and academic interests include high risk obstetrics, premature labour, foetal growth retardation, obstetric epidemiology and quality of the standards of health and clinical provision.

== Career ==
Patel became a member of the Royal College of Obstetricians and Gynaecologists in 1969, and a fellow in 1988. He was elected a fellow of the Royal Society of Edinburgh in 1999. He served as chairman of the Academy of Medical Royal Colleges of Scotland 1994–95, and of the Academy of Medical Royal Colleges of the UK 1996–98. He was president of the Royal College of Obstetricians and Gynaecologists from 1995 to 1998, having been honorary secretary from 1987 to 1992 and vice-president 1992–95.

Lord Patel was the vice president of the charity Attend from 2012 to 2014 when he was elected president of the organization. He currently holds the position of president of Attend.

== Honours ==
Patel received a knighthood in the 1997 Birthday Honours, and was created a life peer on 1 March 1999, as Baron Patel, of Dunkeld in Perth and Kinross. He has served as vice-president of the All-Party Parliamentary Group on Maternity Services since 2002 and of the group on Infertility Services since 2003, as well as being chairman of the Stem Cell Steering Committee since 2003. He has been a member of the Science and Technology committee since his elevation.

In 2006, Lord Patel was appointed Chancellor of the University of Dundee. As part of his investiture he chose to bestow honorary degrees on the Baroness Cox and Professor Anna Glasier OBE.

Lord Patel has been awarded honorary fellowships by numerous professional bodies, including the American College of Obstetricians and Gynecologists (1996), the Society of Obstetricians and Gynaecologists of Canada (1997), the Royal College of Physicians of Edinburgh (1997), the Royal College of Surgeons of Edinburgh (1997), the Royal College of Physicians and Surgeons of Glasgow (1998), the Royal College of Surgeons of England (1998), the Royal Australasian College of Obstetrics and Gynecology (1998), the Royal College of Anaesthetists (1998), the Royal College of Physicians of Ireland (2000), the Faculty of Public Health (2003), the Royal College of General Practitioners (2004) and the Royal College of Psychiatrists (2005), and is an honorary member of the German, Finnish, Argentinian, Chilean and Italian Societies of Obstetrics and Gynaecology. He has been awarded honorary degrees by Edinburgh Napier University (1996), the University of Aberdeen (2001) and the University of St Andrews (2001) (all D.Sc.), the Universities of Stellenbosch (2001) and Athens (2004) (both M.D.), and the University of Dundee (2004) (LL.D.)

On St Andrew's Day, 30 November 2009, Lord Patel was appointed to the Order of the Thistle by Queen Elizabeth II. The Order of the Thistle is the highest chivalric honour in Scotland. In the UK as a whole it is second only to the Order of the Garter amongst chivalric orders. The order honours Scottish men and women who have held public office or who have contributed in some way to national life. Lord Patel became the first Asian appointee in the Order's 322-year history. The order was officially presented by the queen during an audience at Buckingham Palace on 9 June 2010.

Patron of SafeHands for Mothers, a UK-based charity whose mission is to improve maternal and newborn health by harnessing the power of the visual, through the production of films.

On 6 May 2023, Lord Patel took part in the Coronation of Charles III and Camilla, presenting the monarch with the Coronation Ring.

Academic offices
Preceded by James Black	Chancellor of the University of Dundee; 2006–2017	Succeeded by Dame Jocelyn Bell Burnell
Orders of precedence in the United Kingdom
Preceded by The Lord Macdonald of Tradeston	Gentlemen; Baron Patel	Followed by The Lord Stevenson of Coddenham
