= Ram Dayal =

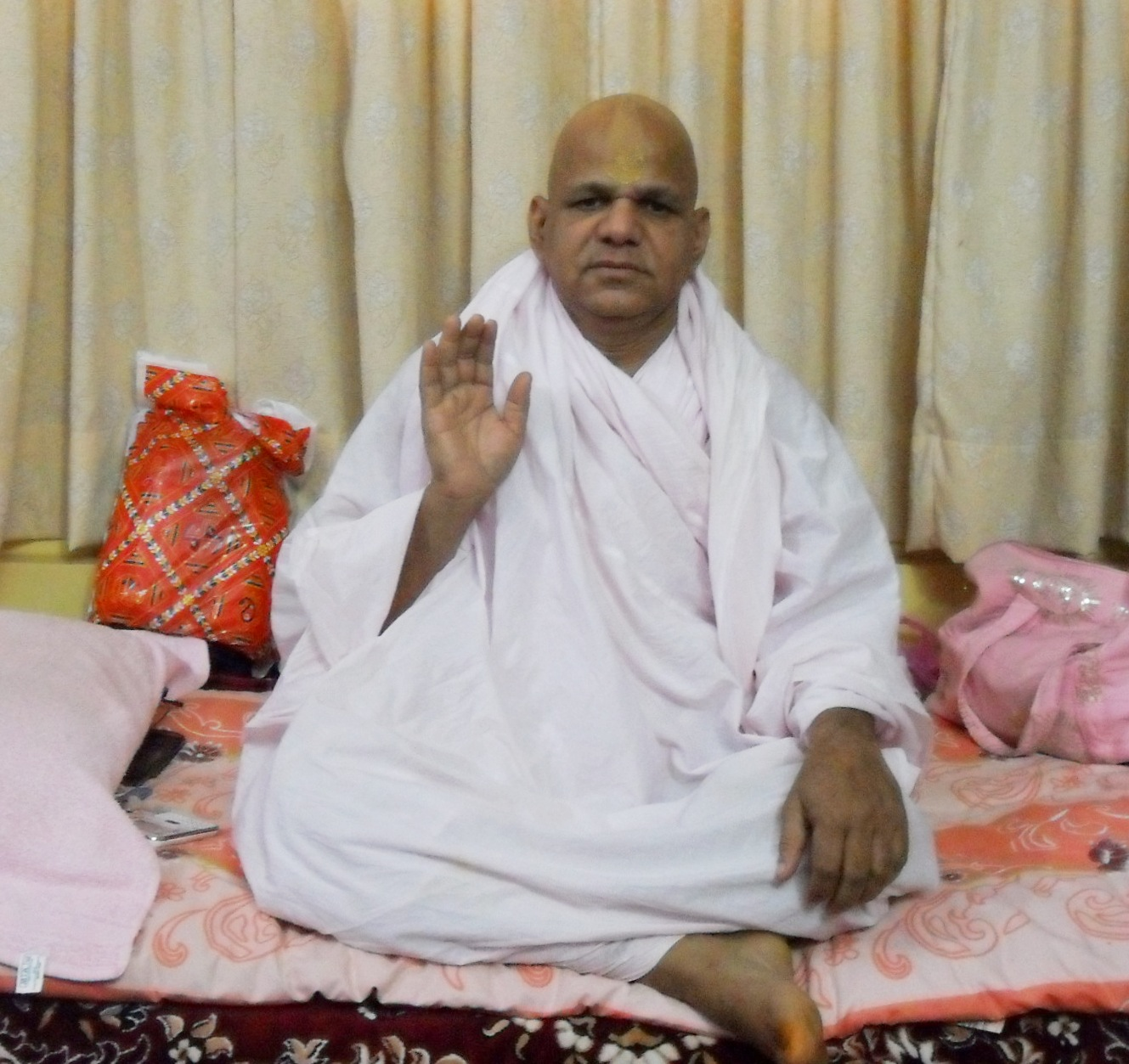
- Ram Dayal in 2012
- Born: 26 September 1956 (age 69); Indore
- Occupation: Spiritual leader

Ram Dayal is the current head of the Ramsnehi Sampradaya (headquarters Shahpura, Bhilwara).

Dayal was born on 26 September 1956 in Indore.

He was accepted as a disciple by Bhagatram Ramsnehi (based in Chittorgarh), on Falgun Budi 14, Bikram Samwat 2030.

On 20 January 1994, he was elected as the head of the Ramsnehi Sampradaya, by members of the organization, as per the tradition. He succeeded Ramkishor at the position.

The Ramsnehi trust runs the following activities inspired by him :

- Ramsnehi Chikitsalaya (Hospital) in Bhilwara
- Swami Ramcharan Kanya Vidyapeeth (Women's College), Bhilwara
- Go-shala in Pushkar, Rajasthan

He is conducting the 265th "Chaturmasa" stay at Vrindavan, India.

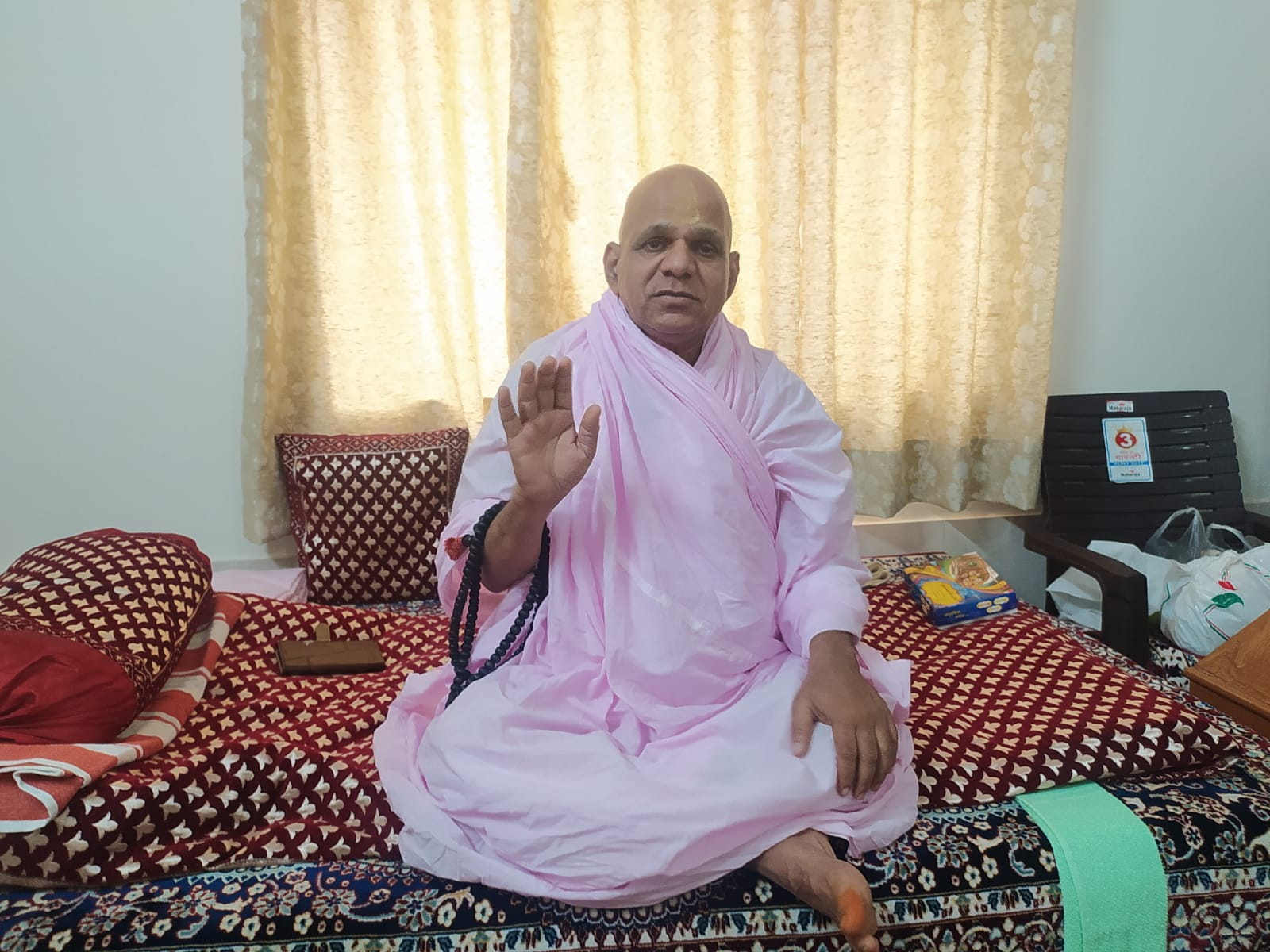
Swami Ji Shri Ram Dayal Ji Maharaj at Vrindavan 265th Chaturmasa event

== See also ==
- Ram Charan Maharaj
- Shahpura, Bhilwara
- Ram Kishor Ji Maharaj
- Ramdwara
- Sri Ram Snehi Bhaskar Magazine
