= Sarawagi =

The Sarawagi or Saraogi or Sarawgi Jain community, meaning a Jain Śrāvaka, is also known as the Khandelwal. They originated from Khandela, a historical town in northern Rajasthan.

The Sarawagi community owes its name to a strong historical association with Jainism. Also technically the term Sarawagi or shravaka is applicable to all Jains, the Khandelwal Jains is the only community that has used it extensively, although the term is sometimes also used by Jain Agrawals in Rajasthan.

The Khandelwals have 84 divisions. The legendary origin of these divisions is given in a 17th-century book, "Shravakotpatti Varnanam". It mentions how the ruler Girakhandel of Khandela was planning to sacrifice one thousand Jain monks in a naramedha yajña. However, with the assistance of goddess Chakreshvari, muni Jinasena persuaded the ruler to give up violence. The ruler along with his eighty-three chiefs became Jain Śrāvakas, giving rise to eighty-four gotra.

== Organizations ==
The Khandelwal Digambar Jain Mahasabha was founded by Lunkaran Pandya of Jhalarapatan and Padam Chand Benara of Agra (both then living in Bombay) on 28 Feb. 1916 in Bombay. The first convention of the Mahasabha was held in 1920, where the publication of "Khandelwal jain Hitechchhu" was initiated. Several regional branches of the Mahasabha were established; however, they all became inactive around 1932. The Mahasabha has been revived recently, its current office is in Lucknow.

It has recently several published directories. So far the community count has been done for 1794 towns with 29,944 families and 185,556 individuals. This does not include the city of Jaipur, which is the largest center.

== Prominent Khandelwal Jains ==
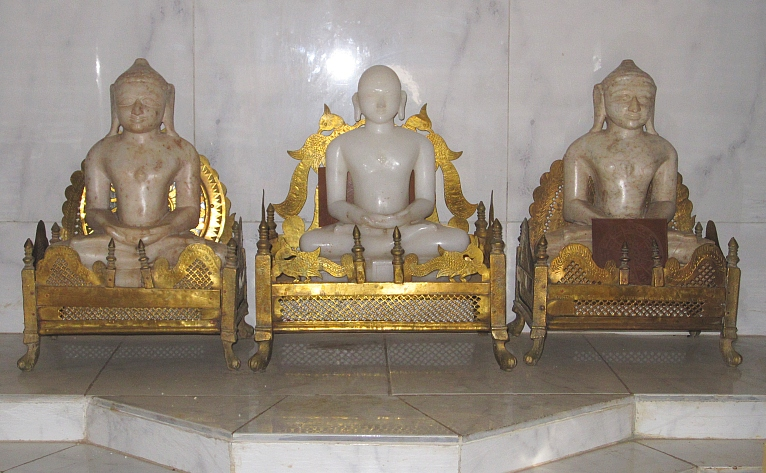
Two idols consecrated by Jivaraj Papriwal with a modern idol in the middle, Bilahri Jain Temple, Katni

संवत १५४८ वर्षे वैशाख सुदी ३ श्री मूलसंघे श्री जिनचन्द्रदेव साह जीवराज पपडीवाल नित्यं प्रणमंति सहर मुडासा राजा स्योसिंघ

— A dedicatory Inscription of Jivaraj Papdiwal of samvat 1548

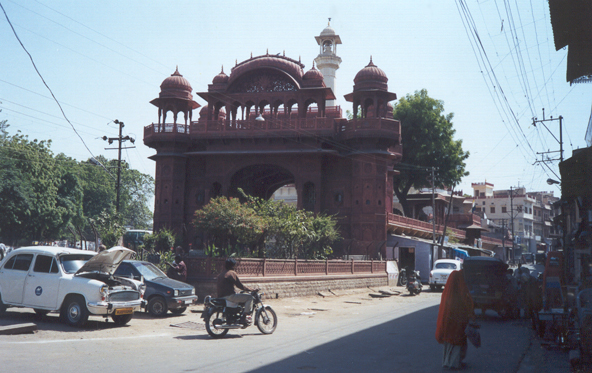
Soniji ki Nasiya, Ajmer constructed by Rai Bahadur Seth Moolchand and Nemichand Soni.

- Jivaraj Papriwal (Pratishtas in 1491 AD)
- Pandit Todarmal (1719–1766), author of Moksh Marg Prakashak
- Poet Bhudhardas (1700–1765)
- Poet Budhjan, 1770-1838 CE

== Agarwal Sarawagis ==
The term Sarawagi is also used by are Agarwal Sarawagis from Churu as well as other districts of Rajasthan. They are a section of Agrawal Jain community.

== See also ==
- Agrawal Jain
- Jainism
- Jainism in Rajasthan
- Kasliwal
