= Kasliwal =

Kasilwal is a surname. Notable people with the surname include:

- Asha Kasliwal, British Indian doctor
- Mansi Kasliwal, Indian-American astronomer
- Munnu Kasliwal (born 1958), Indian jewelry maker
- Narendra Mohan Kasliwal (1928–2021), Indian judge
- Nemi Chandra Kasliwal (1909-1978), Indian politician
- Sir Seth Hukamchand Kasliwal (1874–1959), Indian freedom fighter
- Vidhi Kasliwal, Indian film director and producer
