= Jivaraj Papriwal =

Indian Jain artist

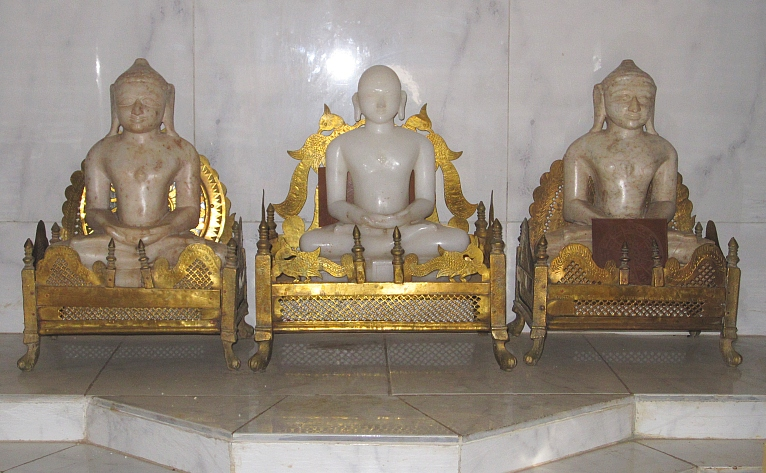
- Two idols consecrated by Jivaraj Papriwal with a modern idol in the middle, Bilahri Jain Temple, Katni

Personal life
- Born: Surat, Gujarat, India
- Notable work(s): Installation of Jain images in Punjab, Haryana, Bengal, Bihar, Bundelkhand, Rajasthan, Gujarat, Maharashtra, and Karnataka
- Known for: Installer of as many as 100,000 Jain images
- Occupation: Trader
- Sect: Digambar and Śvetāmbara

Jivaraja Paprival was the installer of as many as 100,000 Jain images in the 15th century, now found in Jain temples all over India. He was a trader in the town of Modasa believed to be in Gujarat. He was probably born in Surat, Gujarat.

India was overrun during the twelfth and thirteenth centuries by Turkish invaders. The two centuries following were a period of great devastation in North India. Temples were demolished and idols were defaced. These temple images had marked the tradition and identity of the Jain congregations, but few were left.

Paprival resolved that regardless of cost, and the fierce political climate he would find a way to install as many images of Lord Jina as may be needed by Jain communities residing in towns and villages situated anywhere in India. He commissioned teams of workers to cut slabs of marble from quarries and employed armies of craftsmen to carve the images.

संवत १५४८ वर्षे वैशाख सुदी ३ श्री मूलसंघे श्री जिनचन्द्रदेव साह जीवराज पपडीवाल नित्यं प्रणमंति सहर मुडासा राजा स्योसिंघ

— A dedicatory Inscription of samvat 1548

On April 12, 1491, Bhattaraka Jinachandra Deva of Mula Sangh supervised a grand pratishtha or consecration of as many as 100,000 images.

Jivaraja, with an enormous train of carts, then embarked on a pilgrimage to nearly all the Jain Tirthas of India. Braving the possibility of hostile confrontations with the invaders, wherever shravakas along the way lacked an idol he installed images.

Today the images can be seen in Punjab, Haryana, Bengal, Bihar, Bundelkhand, Rajasthan, Gujarat, Maharashtra and Karnataka, installed by Jivaraja in temples of the Digambar and Śvetāmbara sects. Each statue is one to two feet high, composed mostly of white marble but with a few blue, black and green hues, and inscribed with a text mentioning Jivaraja Papdival.

One image was discovered during excavation in the Multan fort, which had a Jain population before the partition. It was placed in a local temple. After the Partition of India it was left behind with a handful of Jains remaining. One of the persons saw in a dream that the image needs to be moved. Just as the image was being moved, the neighborhood was overtaken. It is now in Jaipur. Several images were found at Sammet Shikhar during an excavation in 2000.

Today, in thousands of Jain communities all over India, the shravakas once again possess symbols of the faith thanks to Jivaraja's audacity and vision. Since then, the Indian state of Rajasthan has been the major carving center for Jain idols.

== See also ==
- Sarawagi
