= Anna Glasier =

Anna Glasier OBE FFSRH FRCOG FRSE
- Education: University of Bristol; University of Bristol
- Occupations: physician, clinical research, academic
- Known for: research into emergency contraception
- Relatives: Phillip Glasier (father); Jemima Parry-Jones (sister)
- Medical career
- Field: reproductive medicine
- Sub-specialties: women's health, birth control
- Research: contraception

Annabelle "Anna" Frances Glasier OBE, FFSRH, FRCOG FRSE is an English physician in the field of reproductive medicine. Glasier is a world expert on emergency contraception, and her work has been instrumental in making it available in the UK and other countries without medical prescription.

== Education ==
In 1973, Glasier graduated from the University of Bristol with a BSc. She then attended the University of Edinburgh graduating with a MBChB in 1976. She specialised in obstetrics and gynaecology, working under the supervision of Allan Templeton. She passed her MD in 1983, qualifying as a doctor. Her thesis was on the hormonal mechanisms underlying lactational infertility.

== Career ==
In 1989, Glasier became a clinical scientist at the Medical Research Council Unit of Reproductive Biology. She held the position of Director of Family Planning and Well Woman Services at NHS Lothian from 1990-2010, and was Lead Clinician for Sexual Health. Her research specialities are reproductive health, and she is globally recognised in the field of emergency contraception, with her work playing an instrumental role in its deregulation.

She has worked with international organisations, including the Population Council in New York, and the World Health Organization, where she chaired the Human Reproduction Programme’s Scientific and Technical Advisory Group from 2004 to 2008.

She is an honorary professor at the London School of Hygiene and Tropical Medicine (Department of Public Health and Policy) and the Emeritus Professor in the Centre for Reproductive Health at the University of Edinburgh.

== Awards and honours ==
- OBE for services to women's health, 2005
- Honorary Doctor of Laws from the University of Dundee, 2006
- Lifetime achievement award, Society of Family Planning, 2012
- Honorary graduate of the University of Aberdeen, 2014
- Fellow of the Royal Society of Edinburgh, 2015
- Fellow of the Royal College of Obstetricians and Gynaecologists

== Personal life ==
Glasier is the daughter of Phillip Glasier and sister of Jemima Parry-Jones, both noted for their work with birds of prey.
