= Kanwat =

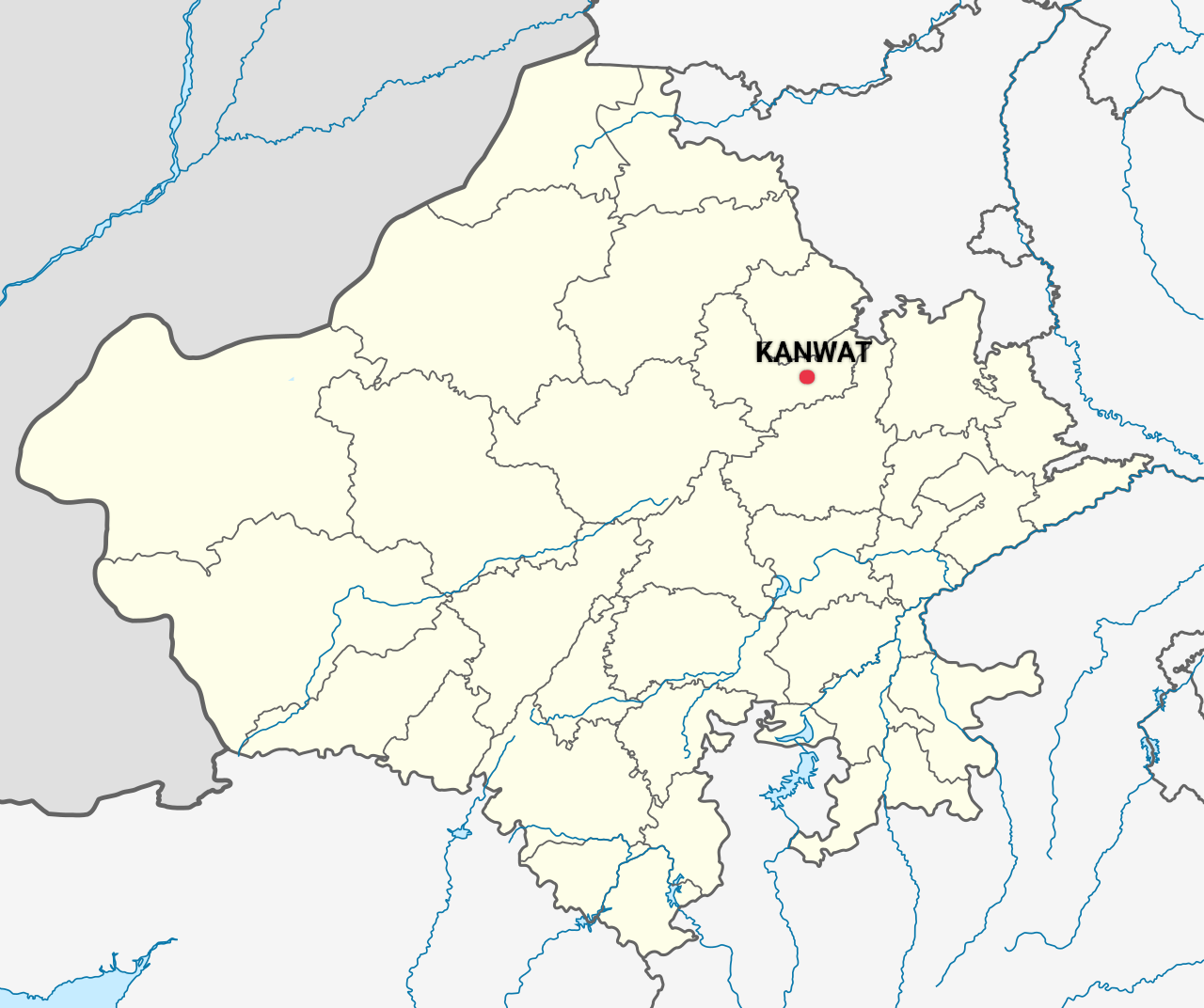
Kanwat

Kanwat is a village in Khandela tehsil of Sikar district in Rajasthan. As per the Population Census 2011, there are 1,357 families residing in Kanwat. The total population of Kanwat is 7,903 out of which 4,100 are males and 3,803 are females.

The population of children of age 0–6 years in Kanwat is 1041 which is 13% of the total population. There are 541 male children and 500 female children between the age 0–6 years.

As per the Census 2011, the literacy rate of Kanwat is 79.6%. Thus Kanwat has higher literacy rate compared to 71.9% of Sikar district. The male literacy rate is 92.72% and the female literacy rate is 65.49% in Kanwat.

Situated on the banks of river Kantali, this city is the largest gram panchayat of Khandela tehsil. It occupies its place in the main education towns of Rajasthan.

Kanwat is also very important from the point of view of business, it is the business center of nearby villages.
