= Ram Kishor =

- Title: 13th -acharya of the Ramsnehi Sampradaya, H.Q. Shahpura

Personal life
- Born: Chaitra Shukla 5, 1976, Vikram Samvat Village Dhabar, District Pali, Marwar, India
- Died: 8 January 1994 Padra, Gujarat, India
- Resting place: Shanti Sthala Shahpura, Bhilwara, Rajathan, India

Religious life
- Religion: Hinduism
- Initiation: Diksa–Falgun Sudi 11, 1983 Vikram Samvat

Senior posting
- Post: Guru, Sannyasi, Acharya
- Predecessor: Darshan Ram
- Successor: Ram Dayal

Sanskrit name
- Sanskrit: राम किशोर

Ram Kishor was the 13th head of the Ramsnehi Sampradaya (headquarter Shahpura, Bhilwara).

== Early life and Sannyasa initiation ==
Ram Kishor was born in 1918 at village Dhabar, district Pali, Rajasthan, in a Rajpurohit family to father Bhaironsinghji and mother Kesharbai.

At the age of 9, he was initiated into Sannyasa by the Ramsnehi saint Kaaraj Ram at Gangapur, Rajasthan. Thereafter he committed himself to studying the scriptures of the sampradaya, as well as Hindu scriptures. He resided at Ramdwaras of Khurja (Bulandshahar) and Charkhewalan, Delhi. He was under tutelage of Gyani Ram at the latter place.

== Philosophy ==
Along with religion and spirituality, his focus was on national issues as well. He participated in the Delhi Shiv Mandir Satyagraha in 1939 and was subsequently jailed for 2 months. He was also an active participant in the Arya Samaj Satyagraha at Hyderabad in 1938.

== Leadership of Ramsnehi Sampradaya ==
He was designated the head of Ramsnehi Sampradaya on Chaitra Shukla Asthami Vikram Samvat 2016 (1960 A.D.). He succeeded Darshan Ram.

He is credited with changing the Ramsnehi Sampradaya to a more contemporary one. Till 1972, all Ramsnehi saints followed the founder's dictum to travel exclusively on foot. Ram Kishor, on the earnest request of devotees, started travelling by car and plane. This enabled a wider reach for the Sampradaya in India as well as abroad. Ram Kishor travelled to Bangkok, Singapore, Malaya, Australia and Fiji for spreading Indian culture and teachings of Ram Charan Maharaj.

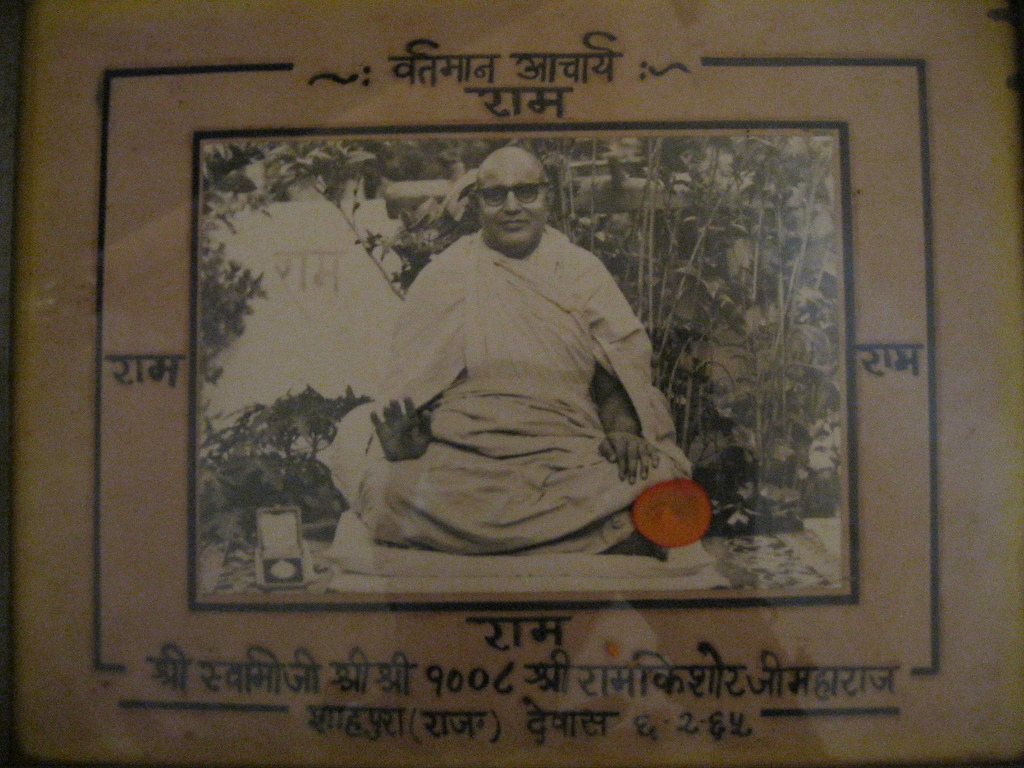
Ram Kishor at Dewas, Madhya Pradesh

He initiated the setting up of temporary centres of Ramsnehi Sampradaya at the Kumbh Melas at Ujjain, Prayag and Haridwar.

He was responsible for starting the Sri Ram Snehi Bhaskar Magazine for improving the outreach of the Ramdwara. . Ram Kishor Ji Maharaj is also the founder of the Ramsnehi Sanskrit Vidyalaya, a school which specializes in Sanskrit education, situated at Shahpura.

Ram Kishor has worked for upliftment of women, tribals as well as downtrodden castes.

== Death ==
Ram Kishor expired on 8 January 1994. He is succeeded by Ram Dayal. His samadhi is Shanti-Sthala located at Shahpura Ramdwara.

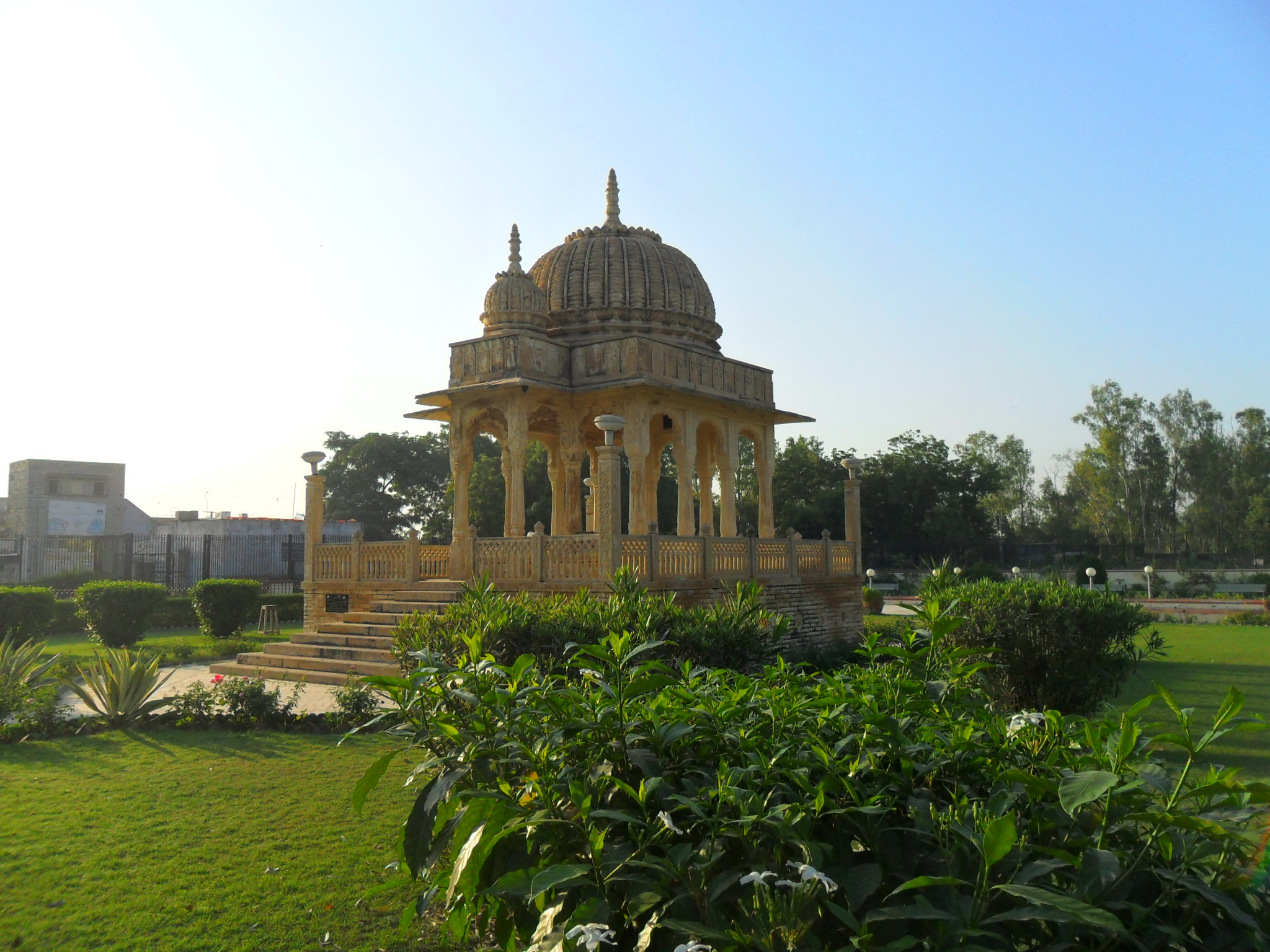
This is the samadhi of the 13th head of Ramsnehi Sampradaya, Ram Kishor. It is located in Ramniwas Dham, Shahpura, Bhilwara

== See also ==
- Ram Charan Maharaj
- Shahpura, Bhilwara
- Ramdwara
