= Killen, Highland =

Coordinates: 57.59376°N 4.20811°W

Killen
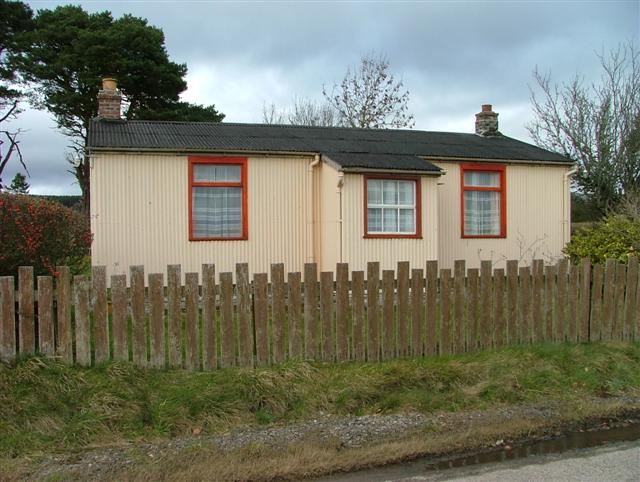
- Roadside Cottage

- Location within the Ross and Cromarty area
- OS grid reference: NH681581
- Council area: Highland
- Country: Scotland
- Sovereign state: United Kingdom
- Post town: Avoch
- Postcode district: IV9 8
- Police: Scotland
- Fire: Scottish
- Ambulance: Scottish

Killen is a small remote rural hamlet, located 3 miles (4.8 km) west of Fortrose, on the Black Isle, Ross-shire, Scottish Highlands and is in the Scottish council area of Highland.

== Notable people ==
- Nancy Loudon, Scottish gynaecologist
