= Khandelwal (surname) =

Khandelwal is a toponymic surname from Khandela in Rajasthan, India. Notable people with the surname include:

- Gulab Khandelwal (1924–2017), Indian poet
- Hemant Khandelwal (born 1964), Indian politician
- Purshottam Khandelwal, Indian politician
- Pyarelal Khandelwal (1925–2009), Indian politician
- Rajeev Khandelwal (born 1975), Indian actor
- Rohit Khandelwal (born 1989), Indian model, actor and television personality
- Varun Khandelwal, Indian television actor
- Vijay Kumar Khandelwal (1936–2007), Indian politician
