= Asha Kasliwal =

UK medical practitioner

- Known for: President of the Faculty of Sexual and Reproductive Healthcare (FSRH)

Asha Kasliwal is a British physician and past President of the Faculty of Sexual and Reproductive Healthcare (FSRH).

== Education ==
Asha Kasliwal immigrated to the UK in 1995 after studying in Mumbai and working in Oman. After graduation, she was a member of the Royal College of Obstetricians and Gynaecologists (RCOG) trainees committee as a representative of overseas doctors.

Kasliwal's main areas of academic and medical focus are care and clinical standards quality, gynaecology within communities, hormone replacement therapy for women undergoing menopause, pregnancy and abortion, and the commissioning of accessible contraceptive and sexual health resources.

Kasliwal was inspired to pursue medicine by Anandibai Gopal Joshi, one of the earliest known Indian women physicians.

== Career ==
Other titles that Kasliwal has are: consultant in community gynaecology and reproductive health care, clinical director for Manchester's Contraception and Sexual Health service, and clinical director for the South Manchester Community Gynaecology service. She is also a specialist member of the "Quality Standards for Contraceptive Services" committee within the National Institute for Health and Care Excellence (NICE), and has been featured in the Royal College of Physicians exhibition, Women in Medicine.

Before becoming the president of FSRH, Kasliwal was the vice president of quality and standards in the FSRH from September 2014 to her election as president of the group, and the clinical director & consultant in community gynaecology and reproductive health.

=== As president of FSRH ===
Succeeding Chris Wilkson's five-year term, Kasliwal became the president of FSRH on 28 July 2016, after being elected to the position in May 2016.

Her priorities within this office included:

- Continue FSRH's engagement with multiple organisations, such as the British Association for Sexual Health and HIV (BASHH), RCGP, and RCOG
- Continue to support Sexual and Reproductive Healthcare (SRH) professionals and commissioners through providing quality standards of care and training
- Expand the inclusivity of all FDRH committees, but particularly nurses and General Practitioners
- FSRH promotion
- Increase the accessibility, availability, and quality of reproductive and sexual healthcare

She was succeeded by Janet Barter in September, 2022.

In 2024, Kasliwal is a member of the International Federation of Gynaecology and Obstetrics, and the chair of their Committee on Contraception. She also runs a menopause clinic.
