= Khandela =

- city
- Location in Rajasthan, India Khandela (India)
- Coordinates: 27.36°N 75.30°E
- Country: India
- State: Rajasthan
- District: sikar
- Elevation: 318 m (1,043 ft)

Population (2011)
  - Total: 22,044

Languages
  - Official: Hindi
- Time zone: UTC+5:30 (IST)
- Vehicle registration: RJ-23

Khandela is a city and municipality in the Sikar district of the Indian state of Rajasthan.

== Etymology ==
Khandela is associated with the origin of Maheshwari Banias, Khandelwal Jains (Sarawagi), Khandelwal Banias and Khandelwal Brahmins. The Khandelwal Jains have 84 divisions. The legendary origin of these divisions is given in a 17th-century text, "Shravakotpatti Varnanam".

The name Khandela is believed to have been originated from the Kshtriya kingdom named Khadaksen kharwad(Jadoun). He had 72 sons from whom 72 clans of Khandelwal originated. Some of those clans are Atolia, Tasid, Akar, America, Mali, Rajoria, Haldia, Raot, Bushar, Pithalia, Vaid, Thekura and Bukhmaria.

== Geography ==
Khandela is at 27.36°N 75.30°E. It has an average elevation of 318 metres (1043 feet).

== Demographics ==
As of 2001 India census, Khandela had a population of 22,475. Males constitute 51% of the population and females 49%.

Khandela has an average literacy rate of 57%, lower than the national average of 59.5%: male literacy is 69%, and female literacy is 45%. In Khandela, 18% of the population is under 6 years of age.

== See also ==
- Khandelwal (disambiguation)
- Sikar
- Shrimadhopur
- Neem-Ka-Thana
- Danta Ramgarh
- Kanwat
