= Jemima Parry-Jones =

British ornithologist (born 1949)

Jemima Parry-Jones MBE
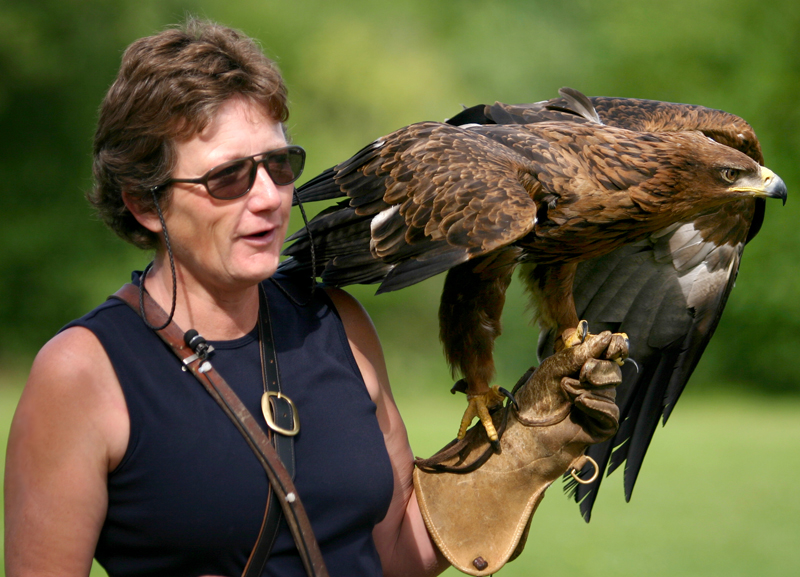
- Born: Jemima Glasier; 6 March 1949 (age 77)
- Education: Guildford School of Acting
- Title: Director of International Centre for Birds of Prey
- Spouse: Jo Parry-Jones
- Parent: Phillip Glasier
- Awards: MBE June 1999
- Website: www.icbp.org

Jemima Parry-Jones MBE (née Glasier; born 6 March 1949) is a British authority on birds of prey (raptors), a conservationist, author, raptor breeder, lecturer, consultant and is the Director of the International Centre for Birds of Prey.

She is the daughter of Phillip Glasier. In 1967, her father started the first specialist collection of birds of prey in the UK.

Parry-Jones has written seven books, co-authored various scientific papers and assisted in the research for many more.

She was appointed a Member of the Order of the British Empire (MBE) in the 1999 Birthday Honours for services to bird conservation.
