= International Centre for Birds of Prey =

Conservation centre in Gloucestershire, England

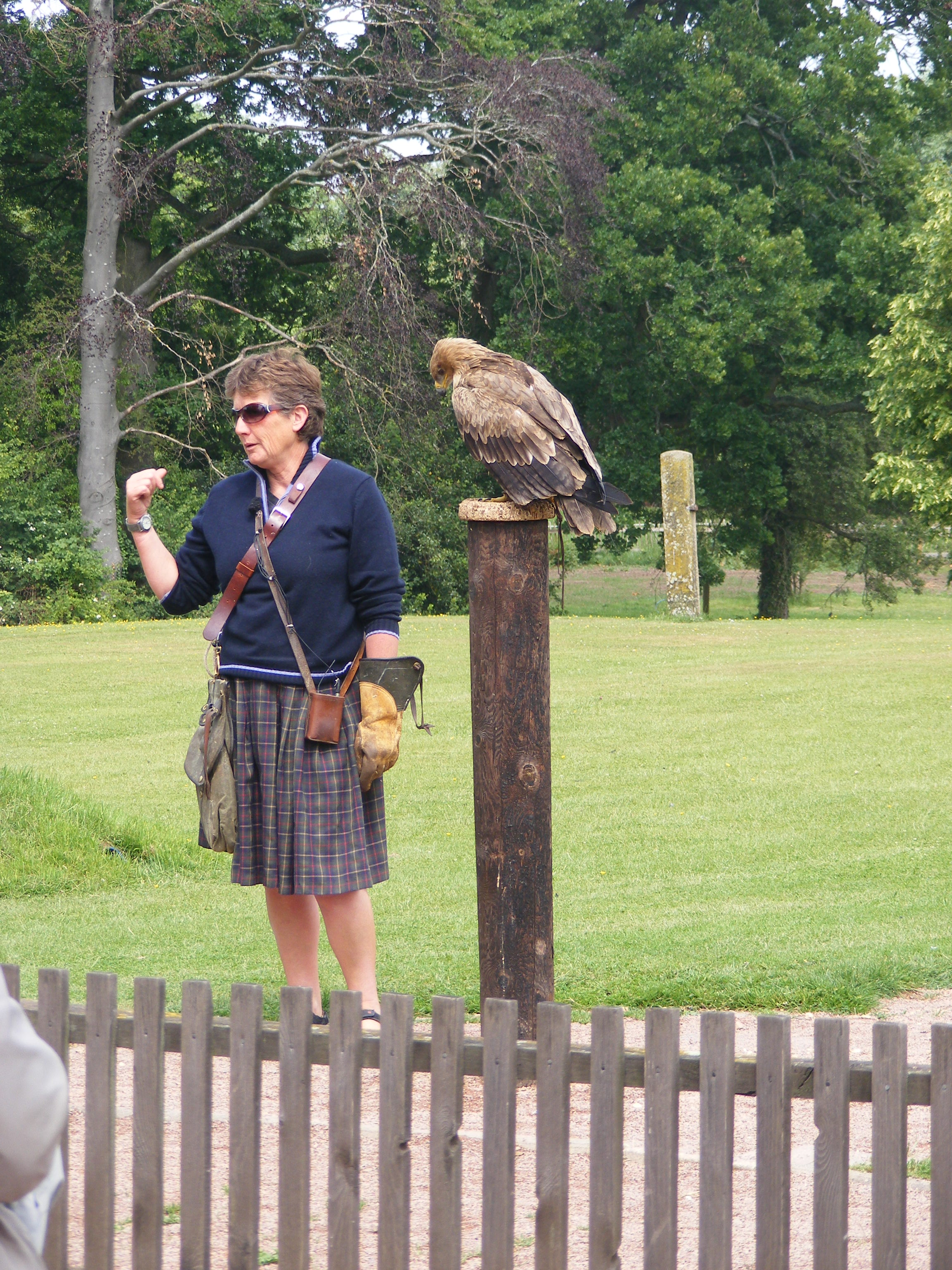
Jemima Parry-Jones with an Indian Tawny Eagle (Aquila rapax)

The International Centre for Birds of Prey (ICBP), formerly the National Birds of Prey Centre, in the United Kingdom houses a large collection of birds of prey with over 60 species of owls, eagles and hawks. It works towards the conservation of birds of prey through education, captive breeding, research and rehabilitation. The centre is located at Boulsdon near Newent in Gloucestershire. The Director is Jemima (Glasier) Parry-Jones.

== History ==
The ICBP was originally established, as the Falconry Centre, by Phillip Glasier as a specialised zoo containing only birds of prey, including falcons, hawks, eagles and owls. It had the aim of educating people about birds of prey and their value in the world. It also aimed to teach falconry. It first opened to the public on 25 May 1967. As of 2023, it is closed to the public.
