= Balatkara Gana =

Ancient Jain monastic order in India

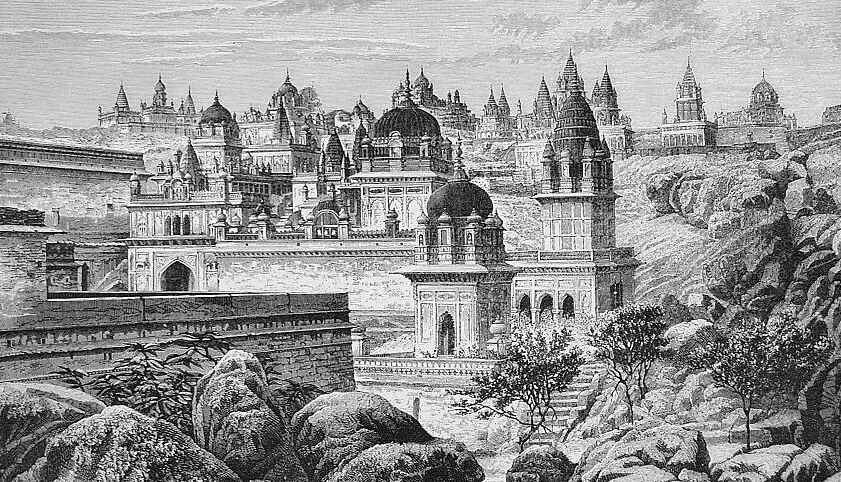
The sacred temple city at Sonagir, a major center of Bhattarakas of Balatkara Gana. From "India and Its Native Princes" By Louis Rousselet, Charles Randolph Buckle London : Chapman and Hall, 1875

Balatkara Gana is an ancient Jain monastic order. It is a section of the Mula Sangh. It is often termed Balatkara Gana Sarasvati Gachchha. Until the beginning of the 20th century, it was present in a number of places in India. However all its seats in North India became vacant in early 20th century. It survives only at Humbaj in Karnataka, which is its ancient seat.

The Bhattaraka seat at Humcha was founded in the 8th century AD, during the reign of Jinadatta Rai, founder of the ruling dynasty of Santar. In 1048 AD, the Mahamandaleshwara Chandarayarus made a donation to a Bhattaraka of Balagara-gana at Balligame near Banavasi in present-day Karnataka. Thus, the Bhattaraka seat at Humcha (or Humbaj) may be one of the oldest of its kind. The current Bhattaraka Srimad Devendrakeerthi Bhattaraka Maharaj has supervised 31 pratishthas outside India.

Balatkara Gana arrived in North India in the 13th century as attested by inscriptions at Un (Vikram 1218), Ahar (Vikram 1228) and Hoshangabad (Vikram 1271.

There exists a chronology (Pattavali) of the northern Indian tradition the early part of which was composed during the time of Bhataraka Prabhachandra II. Early part of the chronology is supported by a 13th-century inscription associated with the building of the Kirti Stambh of Chittor. The disciples of Bhattaraka Prabhachandra founded several branches and sub-branches in several regions of India.

== North India branches ==
Prabhachandra (1318–1368) is regarded to be the first Bhattaraka of Delhi (see Jainism in Delhi) who reigned during 1318–1388. His pupil Padmanandi (1368–1418) had three disciples.

- Sakalakirti (1420–1475), first Bhattakra of Idar lineage.
- Devendrakirti, who had two disciples:
  - Vidyanandi, who founded the Rander-Surat lineage.
  - Tribhuvanakirti who founded the Chanderi lineage.
- Shubhachandra (1418–1450), whose disciple Jinachandra (1450–1514), both Bhattarakas of Delhi, had three pupils:
  - Ratnakirti, founder of Nagaur lineage of 26 Bhattarakas into 20th century.
  - Prabhachandra II, who had two pupils:
    - Dharmachandra, founder of Chittore/Amer/Jaipur lineage
    - Sumatikirti, founder of Gwalior lineage. A branch of this later managed Sonagir until 1974.

The dates for the Bhattarakas of Delhi were computed by Dr. Jyotiprasad Jain.

== Pattavalis (pontifical genealogies) ==
There exist several pattavalis of Mula Sangh-Balatkara Gana-Saraswati Gachchha.

- By Dr. Hoerncle, published in The Indian Antiquary, Oct 1891, p341-361; March 1892, pp. 57–85 . These include Pattavalis

A (1840 CE Nagaur includes Jnatis), B(1840 Chittor includes Jnatis ), C (1450CE), D(1822-1826 CE), E (1880CE, includes Jnatis).

- Amer-Jaipur Pattavali, given by Siddhantacharya Phulachandra Shastri (referred to as Ujjain Pattavali).
- Gwalior-Bateshwar Pattavali, given by Pt. Jhammanlal Jain Tarkatirtha.

The pattavalis give the following segments

- Bhaddalpur, Dakshin Desh (South country) or Malwa, 26 Acharyas
- Ujjain, 18 Acharyas
- Baran (Near Kota), 12 Acharyas
- Gwalior (or Chittor and Baghera), 14 Acharyas
- Ajmer (From Vishalakirti to Prabhachandra, the last Acharya)
- Delhi (Bhattarakas Prabhachnadra, Padmanandi, Shubhachandra and Jinachandra

Because of occasional shifting, some of the monks may have lived in different places at different times, causing some disagreements in the pattavalis.

Three inscriptions describing the construction of Kirti Stambha of Chittor have been found that mention Vishalakirti-Shubhakirti-Dharmachandra thus conforming the names going back to 13th century.

== See also ==
- Kirti Stambha
- Mula Sangh
- Bhattaraka
- Acharya
- Jainism in Delhi
