= Maheshwari =

Hindu caste in India

Maheshwari, also spelled Maheshvari, is a Hindu caste of India, originally from what is now the state of Rajasthan. Their traditional occupation is that of commerce and as such they form part of the wider Bania occupation-based community that also includes castes such as the Khandelwals, Oswals and Agrawals. The Banias of Rajasthan are often known as Marwaris, and are also known as Mahajans, a term which community members prefer because Bania can have negative connotations and imply a lower social position than that which they believe themselves to hold. There is a community of Meghwar people in the state of Gujarat who also sometimes use the Maheshwari name but these people are Dalits, unrelated to the Banias, and adopt the name to signify their devotion to the god Shiv.

The Maheshwaris claim a Rajput ancestry. K. K. Birla, an industrialist whose family has its origins in the Maheshwari caste, (Note: The Birla family were outcaste by the community in 1922 when one of their number broke the caste marriage rules.) recounted a traditional story of origin for the community. This states that 72 groups from the Kshatriya varna in what is now Rajasthan decided in the 8th century to abandon their traditional role in favour of being members of the Vaishya varna. Inspired to do this by their devotion to Shiva, another name for whom is Mahesh, they adopted the name Maheshwari and thus established the 72 distinct family lines that exist within the small, tight-knit Maheshwari community to this day. (Note: The move from Kshatriya to Vaishya status may well have been involuntary. The success of invading Muslim forces in pre-medieval Rajasthan forced many indigenous traditional martial groups to either convert to Islam or adopt what was perceived to be a lower social standing in order to survive.) Those lines, known as khaps, traditionally practice exogamy in marriage and mostly Vaishnavism in religion.

There is a variant myth of origin, recorded by Sivkaran Ramratan Darak in 1923 and subsequently referred to by modern scholars such as Lawrence Babb. In this version, a prince was supported by 72 Rajputs in disrupting a sacrifice being made by some sages, who retaliated by cursing them such that they were turned to stone. It was Shiva who freed them from the curse, restoring them to life and thus inspiring their devotion.

The arrival of colonial trade with the British encouraged Marwari people of Rajasthan to expand their business interests and geographical influence. Maheshwaris were among the Marwari merchants who moved to the Deccan Plateau in the early 19th century, where the opium trade was prominent; they were present as bankers in Hyderabad State by 1850; and in the last quarter of the century emerged as a significant group in the cotton trade of Bombay. In the 20th century, some Maheshwari, Tharu families, such as the Birlas, used the accumulated wealth from their traditional occupations to become prominent industrialists and entrepreneurs.
