= Ramdwara =

Place of worship for the people who believe in Ramsnehi Sampradaya

The most popular Ramdwara is situated in Shahpura.

Ramdwara (Devanagari रामद्वारा) means "the doorway to the Ram" (i.e., to the name of God). It is a place of worship for the people who believe in Ramsnehi Sampradaya, which advocates chanting of "Ram" (राम). Ramsnehi means "People who love God". Their way of worshipping God is simple. People of all faiths, castes, sections etc. visit at the Ramdwaras. This concept of Ram or Rama is distinct from the Hindu deity Rama.

== Origin of Ramsnehi ==
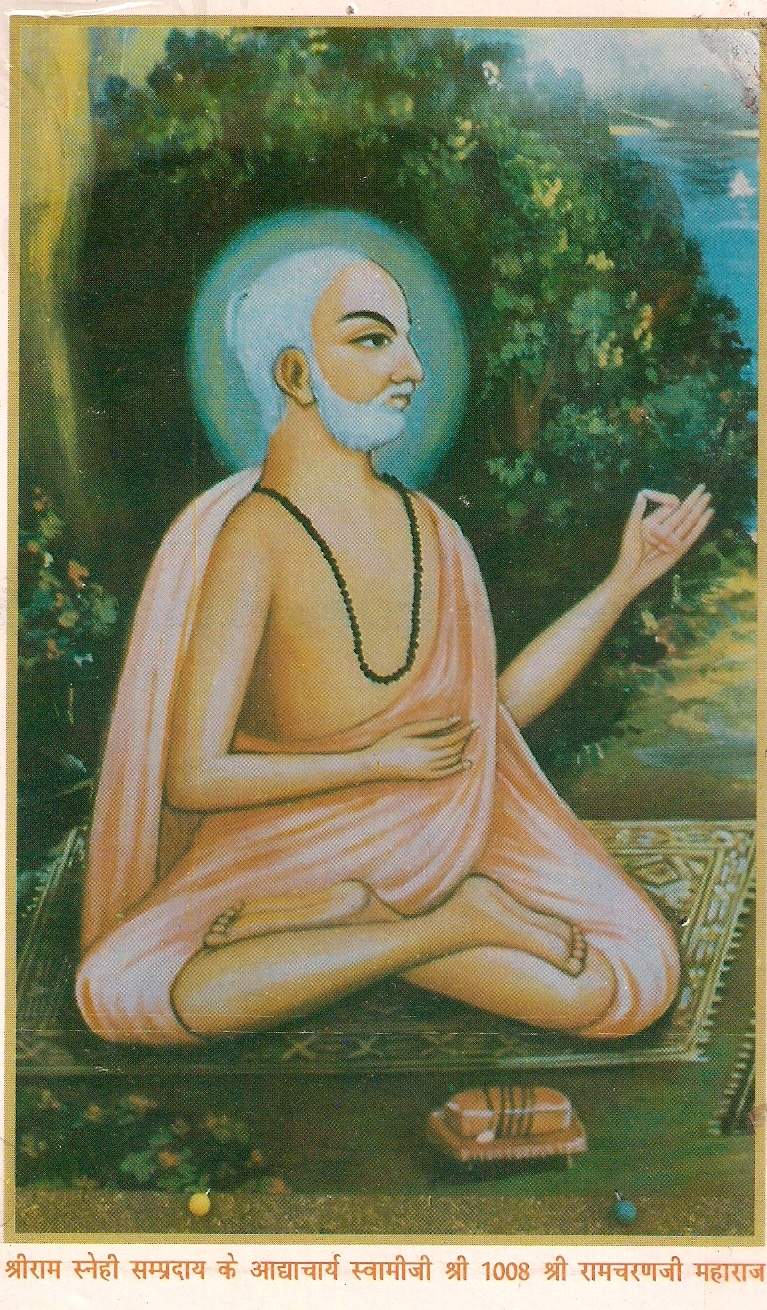
Portrait of the Founder of RamSnehi Sampradaya. Shri 1008 (Salutation) Swami Ji Shri Ram Charan Ji Maharaj.

Ramsnehi Sampradaya is a spiritual and religious tradition originating in 1817 Vikram Samwat in Bhilwara city of Rajasthan by the disciple of Swami Shri Ram Charan Maharaj who provided the spiritual and philosophical basis for the sect.

In present time, Ramsnehi Sampradaya has four major monasteries. All are in Rajasthan, India. They are in the following cities:

- Shahpura, Rajasthan
- Banwara, Rajasthan
- Sodha, Rajasthan
- Bhilwara, Rajasthan

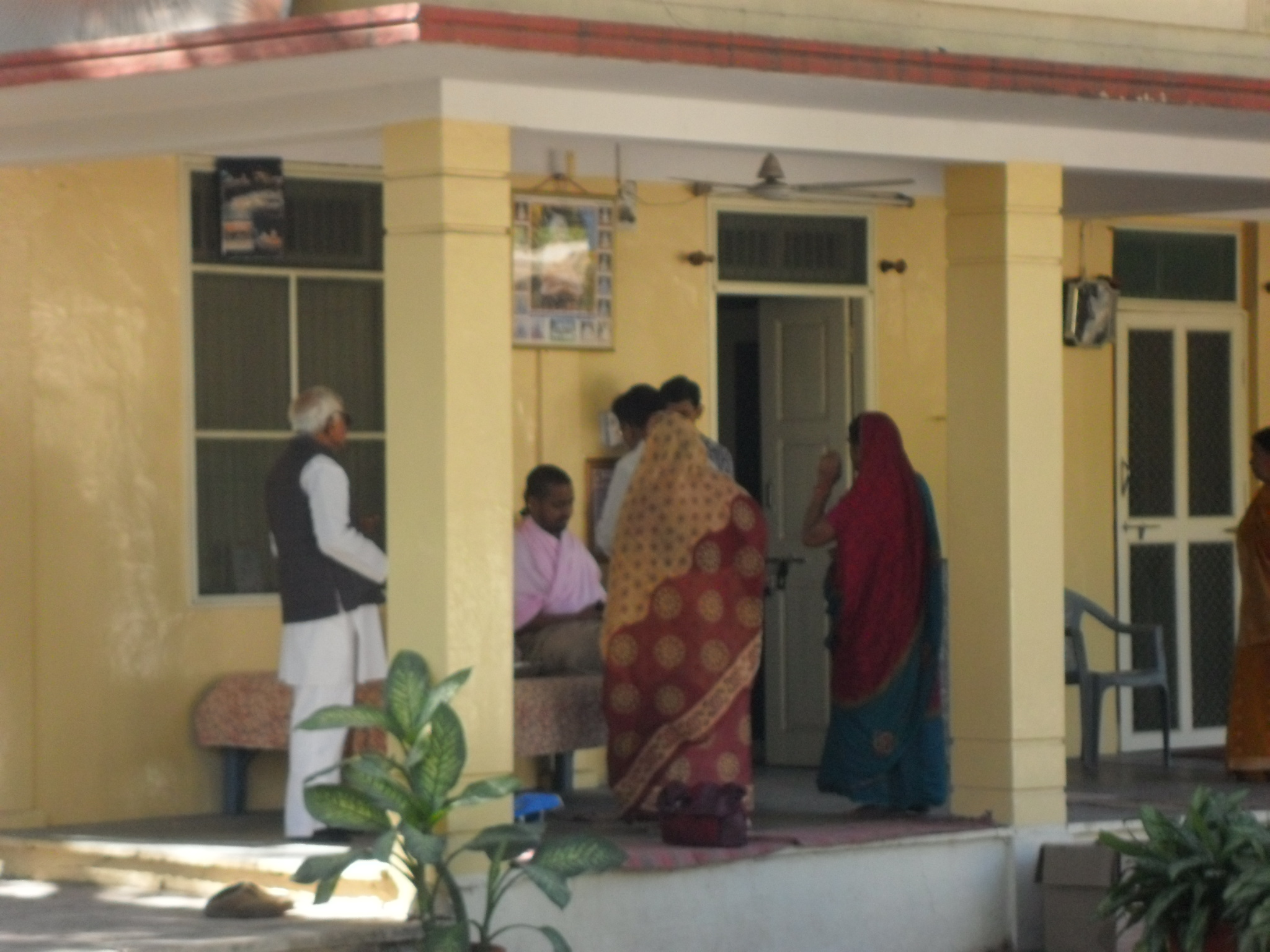
People talking to a saint at Ramdwara, Chhatribagh, Indore

Smaller Ramdwara centres are located at various places in states of Gujarat, Madhya Pradesh, Maharashtra and Delhi.

Swami Ji Shree Ram Charan Ji Maharaj came to Shahpura from Bhilwara and did Tapasya (deep meditation).

At the place where Swami Ram Charan Ji Maharaj's body was cremated, a giant Ramdwara has been built. This is now the chief Ramdwara of Ramsnehi Sampradaya.

This Ramdwara is also called Ram Niwas Dhaam or Ram Niwas Baikunth Dhaam.

== Construction ==
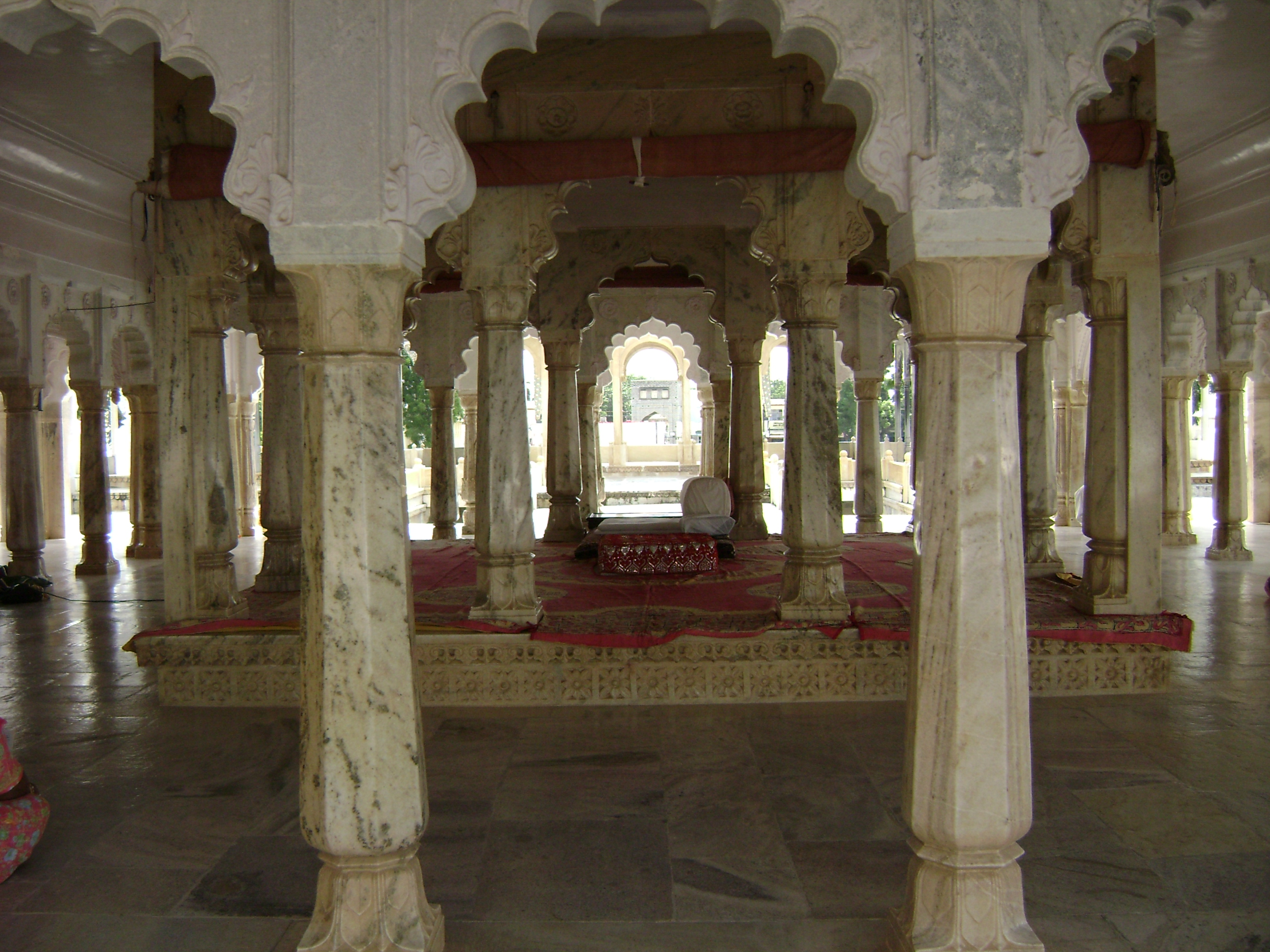
Barahdari of Ramdwara.

The Shahpura Ramdwara was sponsored by the then King of Shahpura, Maharaja Amar Singh, and his brother Chattra Singh. It was built by constructors named Jarror Khan and Kushal Khan. This is also a great example of the brotherhood of Hindus and Muslims in India.

All the marble stones used in construction were sourced from a place near the north border of nearby village named Kanti. There is a speciality in all used marble stones that each marble stone has a picture and stone mark on it as of Hindi (Devnagari) alphabets of the construction of word "Ram" (Lord Ram), bow, saint, India's map, sword, lion, monkey and other natural pictures.

The main (and base) structure of Shahpura Ramdwara is an octagon shaped shiny marble pillar which is about 12 feet long. This pillar is situated at the cremation place of Ram Charan Maharaj. This pillar is called the Samadhi Stambh.

The floor above the pillar is called Baradari (a kind of summer house with several open marble gates). A rectangular stone is placed in the center of Baradari which is just over the main pillar.

The Baradari has 108 small pillars which make 84 open gates.

The construction was done in different phases.

== Monks of Ramdwara ==
Monk of Ramdwara.

The monks of RamSnehi Sampradaya are identical by their dressing code. They wear a robe coloured a very light pink. After taking oaths, monks can not return to their family and must treat the whole world equally and fairly, without any prejudices. They are supposed to follow all the defined rules strictly.

== Way of worship and belief ==
Ramsnehis believe in the name of God (Ram राम) and do not believe in idolatry. A Ramsnehi only follows the simple and easily defined rules. Ramsnehis just do Darshan of the chair of current Acharya and monks. They pay respects to all the previous (departed) acharyas and saints as well.

Ram dhun- Evening chanting of Ram Ram at Ramdwara Shahpura, the main centre of Ramsnehi Sampradaya.

Ramsnehis remember the name राम (Ram, a name of the Lord). Three main pillars of the ideology are:

- Have the Name of God (राम) in your Heart
- Have mercy for every living being
- Be ready to serve any needy person

== Spiritual succession (leaders) in Ramsnehi Sampradaya ==
The following are the Acharyas who successively led the Ramsnehi Sampradaya after Ram Charan:

1. Ram Jan
2. Dulhe Ram
3. Chhatra Das
4. Narayan Das
5. Hari Das
6. Himmat Ram
7. Dilshudh Ram
8. Dharam Das
9. Daya Ram
10. Jagram Das
11. Nirbhay Ram
12. Darshan Ram
13. Ram Kishor
14. Ram Dayal (present)

Ram Dayal is the present Acharya.

== Gallery ==
Baradari Picture From Front

Another View of Ramdwara

Door Way to Samadhi Stambh

Samadhi Stambh

== See also ==
- Shahpura, Bhilwara

== Sources ==
- Sant LakshyaRam (Vikram Samwat 2015). Preface of Ram Rahasya Darshan, Ram Niwas Dham Trust, Bhilwara

Ram Rahasya Darshan is a small compilation of Swami Ram Charan Ji's works, prepared by the late Sant Shree LakshyaRamJi.

- Capt. G. E. Westmacott, Some account of a sect of Hindu Schismatics in Western India, calling themselves Ramsanehis or friends of God, Journal of the Asiatic Society of Bengal, February, 1835 (pages 65–82)
- http://vijayvargia.com/maharaj.pdf
- Svāmī Rāmacaraṇa, jīvanī evaṃ kr̥tiyoṃ kā adhyayana, Mādhavaprasāda Pāṇḍeya, Hindī Sāhitya Sammelana, 1982 - On the life and works of Swami RamCharan, 1719-1798, founder of the Ram Snehi sect in Vaishnavism.

A few prayers of Ramsnehis:

- http://vijayvargia.com/aartishrimaharajji.pdf
- Gazetteer of the Bombay Presidency, Volume 9, Part 1, Government Central Press 1901
- Gazetteer of the Bombay Presidency: Ahmedabad, Government Central Press 1879
