= College of Sexual and Reproductive Healthcare =

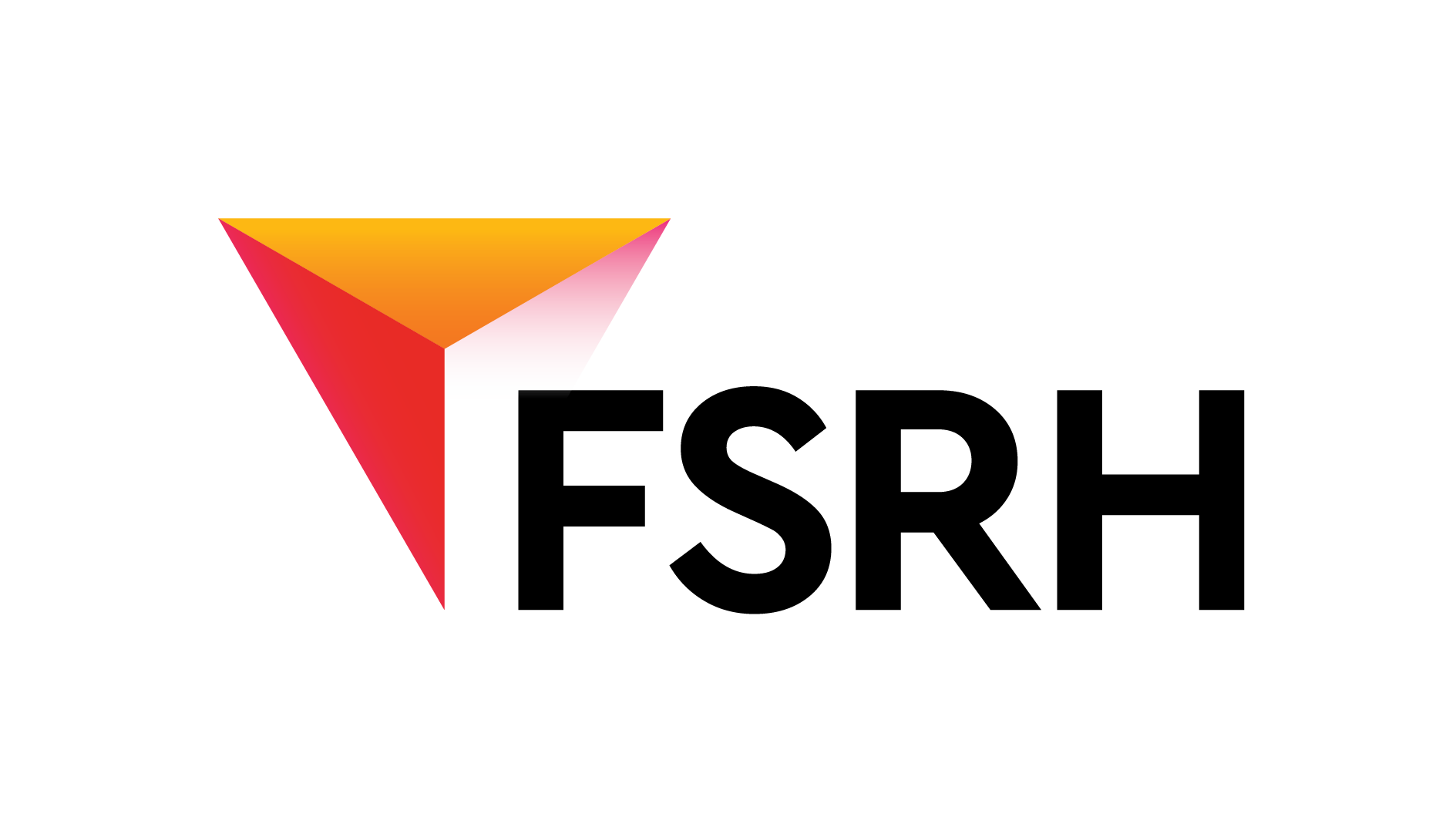
- Logo before the organisation's renaming in 2025
- Former names: Faculty of Sexual and Reproductive Healthcare, Faculty of Family Planning and Reproductive Health Care
- Motto: We believe that access to sexual and reproductive healthcare is a fundamental right.
- Established: 1993
- President: Dr Janet Barter
- Vice-president: Dr Cindy Farmer, Dr Charlotte Porter, Dr Manisha Singh, Dr Zara Haider, Dr Maryam Nasri
- Location: London, United Kingdom
- Website: www.cosrh.org

The College of Sexual and Reproductive Healthcare (CoSRH) previously FSRH, is a British professional membership body dedicated to improving the practice of sexual and reproductive healthcare, and is the voice for professionals working in this area. As a multi-disciplinary organisation, it sets clinical guidance and standards, provides training and lifelong education, and champions safe and effective sexual and reproductive healthcare across the life course for all. It represents over 14,000 healthcare professionals. The organisation believes that access to SRH is a fundamental right. They work together with members and partners to shape better sexual and reproductive healthcare for all.

Their vision is of high-quality sexual and reproductive health at every stage of our lives.

In 2024, the president is Dr Janet Barter; she succeeded Dr Asha Kasliwal in the post.

== History and Mission ==
The National Association of Family Planning Doctors was established in the early 1970s, when approximately 1000 family planning clinics were handed over to the National Health Service (NHS) to be managed by the Local Area Health Authority Public Health departments. This left no medical body to represent doctors working in this field that could facilitate sharing of good practice and the development of standards, guidelines and training.

In 1972, the Royal College of Obstetricians and Gynaecologists (RCOG) established the Joint Committee on Contraception (JCC) in partnership with the Royal College of General Practitioners (RCGP), which took over the FPA's training role. In 1974, the National Association of Family Planning Doctors (NAFPD) was formed to represent doctors working in the field and disseminate good practice.

The first president of NAFPD was Professor Sir Stanley Clayton who was also President of the RCOG, which cemented the connection between what is now the Faculty and the RCOG. NAFPD published the first issue of what is now the Journal of Family Planning and Reproductive Health Care C the following year in 1975.

On 26 March 1993, the Faculty of Family Planning and Reproductive Healthcare was set up as part of the Royal College of Obstetricians and Gynaecologists and in 1997 the Clicinal Effectiveness Committee was established. The name of the Faculty changed to the Faculty of Sexual and Reproductive Healthcare (FRSH) in 2007. Lastly, the name changed to College of Sexual and Reproductive Healthcare in 2025.

The College's works to advance medical knowledge and training in sexual and reproductive health care, as well as promoting high standards of professional practice in the area encourage improvements in quality and provide a voice for professionals involved in SRH. These underpin the main purpose of the organisation, to ensure that patients are safely and properly cared for.

== Membership ==
CoSRH Membership is open to healthcare professionals who have passed their qualifications and maintain appropriate continuous professional development (CPD). It offers a range of membership options based on qualifications, professional interests, and career stages. The types of membership available are:

- Diplomate Membership: Awarded to individuals who have successfully completed the CoSRH Diploma qualification. Diplomate members enjoy access to a benefits package that supports their ongoing professional development, including free recertification for maintaining their qualifications. This membership is ideal for healthcare professionals who are committed to advancing their skills in SRH.
- Associate Membership: Available to candidates who have completed one of the CoSRH's Letters of Competence (LoC) qualifications, such as LoC IUT or LoC SDI. Associate members gain access to a wide range of benefits that help them stay informed and continue developing their expertise in SRH.
- Membership of the CoSRH (MCSRH): Awarded to candidates who pass both Part I and Part II of the MCSRH examination, typically undertaken by Specialty Registrars in Community Sexual and Reproductive Health (CSRH). MCSRH members have access to a comprehensive package of resources and professional development opportunities that support them throughout their careers.
- Affiliate Membership: Open to anyone with an interest in sexual and reproductive health, Affiliate membership is not tied to any formal qualifications. Affiliate members gain access to a range of resources that help them stay informed and connected with the SRH community.
- Affiliate International Membership: Available to candidates who have completed the SRH International Programme. This membership is designed for international healthcare professionals who wish to stay engaged with SRH developments globally. CoSRH offers various CPD and training opportunities for international members.
- Retired Membership: Available to existing CoSRH Members, Diplomates, Associates, Affiliates, or Fellows who are retiring from all paid practice. Retired members retain access to a range of member benefits, including continued opportunities for engagement and networking within the SRH field.

Members benefit from ongoing educational opportunities, access to the latest SRH resources, and the chance to network with other professionals in the field of sexual and reproductive healthcare.

== Examinations ==
The College of Sexual and Reproductive Healthcare (CoSRH) awards Membership of the College of Sexual and Reproductive Healthcare (MCSRH) by examination. This qualification is recognised in the field of sexual and reproductive healthcare and is held by clinicians who provide expert care across community, primary, and acute healthcare settings. The MCSRH qualification is a mark of expertise and professional development in sexual and reproductive healthcare (SRH).

Examination Components

The MCSRH has two parts, each designed to assess a candidate's knowledge, skills, and clinical competence:

- Part I: Single Best Answer (SBA) Examination – This section evaluates candidates on core knowledge required for sexual and reproductive health. The exam consists of multiple-choice questions, with candidates selecting the single best answer from a list of options.
- Part II: Knowledge Assessment Test (KAT) and Objective Structured Clinical Examination (OSCE) – This component includes both a Knowledge Assessment Test (KAT) and an OSCE, which assesses clinical skills and decision-making abilities in a practical context.

The syllabus for the MCSRH examination is based on the Community Sexual and Reproductive Health (CSRH) Curriculum Capabilities in Practice (CiPs), ensuring that candidates are tested on relevant and up-to-date knowledge and competencies necessary for their professional practice.

Both the Part I and Part II examinations are conducted online via secure online testing platforms, allowing candidates flexibility in exam scheduling and location.

== Training and certification ==
The College of Sexual and Reproductive Healthcare (CoSRH) offers a variety of qualifications aimed at enhancing the skills and knowledge of healthcare professionals in sexual and reproductive health. These qualifications cater to different areas of expertise, ensuring that practitioners meet high standards of care.

Letters of Competence (LoC) are awarded to professionals trained in specific contraceptive techniques. This includes:

- The LoC in Subdermal Contraceptive Implants Insertion and Removal (LoC SDI-IR) and the LoC in Subdermal Implants Insertion Only (LoC SDI-IO), which focus on the insertion and removal of contraceptive implants.
- The LoC in Intrauterine Techniques (LoC IUT), awarded to those trained in the insertion of intrauterine devices (IUDs).

The CoSRH Diploma (DCSRH) is a core qualification, designed for healthcare professionals delivering basic sexual and reproductive health services. This qualification equips practitioners to provide high-quality contraception and SRH care.

The Online Theory Assessment (OTA) forms part of the qualification pathway and tests the theoretical knowledge required for certain certifications.

For those specialising in menopause care, the CoSRH offers:

- The Menopause Care Professional Certificate, a qualification aimed at providing foundational skills in menopause management.
- The Menopause Care Professional Diploma, which is an advanced qualification for professionals delivering specialist menopause care.
- The Menopause Care Special Skills Module, designed for clinicians who wish to further develop their skills in managing menopause.

The CoSRH also provides Special Skills Modules (SSM) in specific areas of sexual and reproductive health, including:

- Abortion Care, which equips professionals with the skills to provide safe and effective abortion services.
- Ultrasound, which focuses on the use of ultrasound technology in SRH.
- Vasectomy, which provides the necessary training for clinicians performing vasectomies.

These training programmes ensure that healthcare professionals are well-prepared to offer expert sexual and reproductive healthcare across various settings.

CoSRH works with Wellbeing of Women to fund a one-year research scholarship.

== Publications ==
The college publishes a journal, the Journal of Family Planning and Reproductive Health Care, which was established in 1974. The Journal of Family Planning and Reproductive Health Care was relaunched in 2018 as BMJ Sexual & Reproductive Health.
