= Khandelwal Vaishya =

Khandelwal
Regions with significant populations
- India (Rajasthan)

Languages
- Hindi, Marwari, English

Religion
- Jainism, Hinduism

Related ethnic groups
- Brahmans. Vaishya

Khandelwal is a Marwari trading community originally from Khaṇḍela, a historical town in northern Rajasthan, India. Khandelwals are mainly present around the Rajasthan districts of Jaipur, Dausa, Sikar, Alwar, Bharatpur, Gangapur and Ajmer.

== Origin ==
The Khandelwal community traces its origin and name from Khandela, a town in Sikar district. They believe their name derives from a sage called Khandel, whose 72 1/2 sons started the 72 1/2 gotras (clans) into which the community is divided. Each clan worships its own kuldevi. These Gotras are subdivision of the community.

The 72 Sons, 72 Gotras are Aakad, Aameria, Aatoliya, Akar, Badaya, Badgoti, Badhera, Bajargan, Bamb, Banawadi, Batwada, Bhandaria, Bhimwal, Bhukhmaria, Budhwaria, Bushar, Dangayach, Dans, Dass, Dhamani, Dhokariya, Dusad, Farsoiya, Ghiya, Haldiya, Janghiniya, Jasoriya, Jhalani (Zalani), Kanungo, Kath, Kathoriya, Katta, Kayathwal, Kedavat, Kharwal, Khunteta, Khuthera, Kilkiliya, Kodiya, Kulwal (Koolwal), Labhi, Machiwal, Mali, Mamodia, Manakbohra, Matha, Meharwal, Methi, Nainiwal, Natani, Naneria, Narayanwal, Pabuwal, Patodia, Pitaliya, Rajoria, Rawat (Raot), Shahra, Sakunia, Samariya, Samoliya, Sethi, Sirohiya, Siroya, Soukhia, Tambi, Tamolia, Tasid, Tatar, Thakuria (Thekura), Todwal, Vaidh (Viaidya).
