= Ram Charan (guru) =

Indian Hindu saint

guru Ram Charan
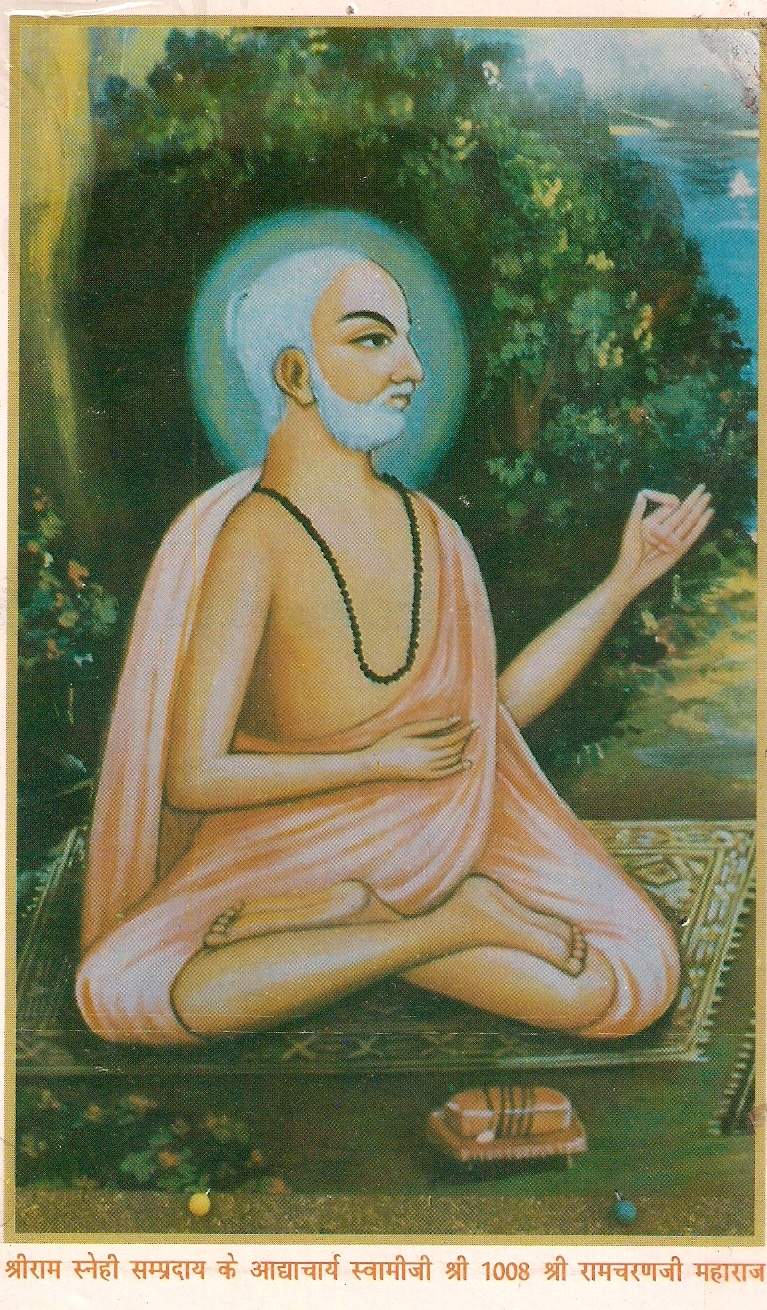
- Title: Founder-acharya of the Ramdwara, H.Q. Shahpura

Personal life
- Born: Ram Krishna Vijayvargiya; 24 February 1720 Soda Village, Tonk District, Mewar, India
- Died: 1799 (aged 78–79) Shahpura, Bhilwara, Rajasthan, India
- Resting place: Shahpura, Bhilwara, Rajasthan; 25.620253 N,74.92153 E

Religious life
- Religion: Hinduism

Religious career
- Post: Guru, Sannyasi, Acharya
- Predecessor: Kripa Ram

Ram Charan (Hindi: राम चारण) (1720–1799)) is the Rajasthani Hindu guru, inspirator of a religious tradition called Ramsnehi Sampradaya or Ramdwara. He initiated and illustrated Nirguna (absolute) Bhakti, although he was not against Saguna Bhakti. He initiated and tried to eliminate "show", blind faith, hypocrisy and misled existing in the Hindu religion and preferred to worship the 'name of God', Rama, over God, to not get involved in false "show" activities.

== Early life ==
Ram Charan was born in Vijayvargiya (Vaishya) family at Sodha, a village in Malpura tehsil the Tonk district of Rajasthan on 24 February 1720 (Māgh Shukla 14 in Bikram Samwat 1776). His father's name was Bakhat Ram Vijayvargiya and his mother's name was Devhuti Devi. His parents lived in Banwara village near Malpura, Rajasthan. Charan's childhood name was "Ram Kishan".

Charan married Gulab Kanwar and became Patwari after marriage. After some time the king of Jaipur (Amber, India) Jai Singh II of Amber offered him the post of Divan of Jaipur of Malpura branch.

== Spiritual life ==
Ram Charan began to lose interest in materialism after his father's death in 1743 AD. One day he found out about the forecast of Bhringi Saint about his destiny. On that same night he dreamt that a saint saved him from drowning in a river. The next day, he got permission from his family indirectly to leave home forever and began his quest to know God and find a perfect spiritual Guru in 1808 Bikram Samwat. Some believed that he left his house leaving his wife and a daughter behind.

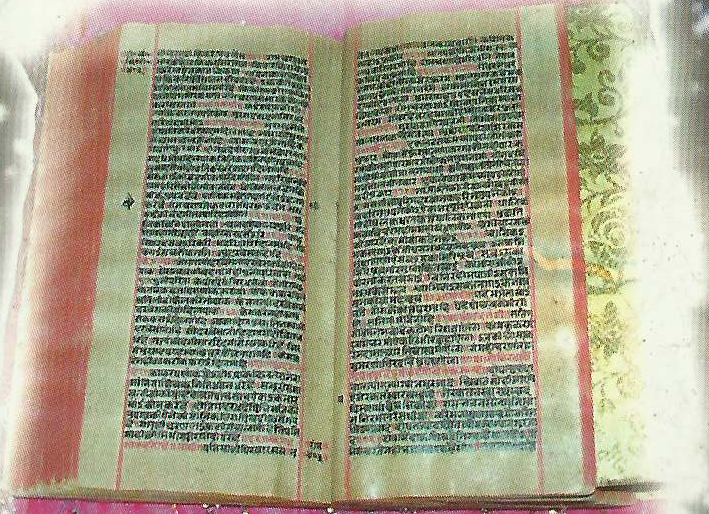
Picture of oldest version of "Anubhav Vaani", the collection of works composed by Ram Charan Maharaj. It originally belonged to Saroopabai, the daughter of NavalRamji. It is handwritten and illustrated. About 200 years old, now kept at Shahpura Ramdwara.

He started travelling southwards, asking people about the saint he saw in his dream, explaining what the saint would look like. Finally, he found the saint "Kripa Ram" in Dantra village near Shahpura in Bhilwara district of Rajasthan. He became a disciple of Kripa Ram Maharaj and followed him. For nine years of tapasya he lived under the command of saint Kripa Ram. Kripa Ram was a disciple of Sant Das. During those nine years, Ram Charan performed many miracles which are still well known among the local people and "Ram Snehi Samprday". He also became very popular for his unique nirguna Bhakti. He visited many places, explaining his experience and advising people to eliminate "show", blind faith, hypocrisy and misleading teachings in the Hindu religion. He came to Bhilwara in 1817 (Bikram Samwat)and selected one lonely place named Miya Chand's bawri ( Step Well) for tapasya. By this time, he had reached the extreme level of Tapasya and reaching on the way to Nirvana.

== Philosophy ==
Ram dhun- Evening chanting of Ram Ram at Ramdwara Shahpura, the main centre of Ramsnehi Sampradaya.

Ram Charan advocated saying Raam Raam (Hindi: राम राम) as the way of reaching the ultimate. He preached selfless devotion as a means to realise God. He promoted Bhakti in general, trying to eliminate conflicts between Saguna and Nirguna types. Vaani Ji, the collection of works composed by him, focuses on knowledge, devotion and detachment. The spiritual master, Guru has been given the highest status by Swamiji in his own life, as is said in his shlokas. Often, the Guru is equated with 'Raam'. The student or seeker is told to avoid reading huge texts and instead focus on chanting Raam Raam as the simplest means to self-realization. The supreme being is present everywhere, in every living being. Swamiji followed the Vishishtadvaita school of thoughts. Non violence to any living being, including insects is a central tenet. The Bhagvatam is referred to most frequently, compared to other ancient Indian texts.

== Social Reform ==
Ram Charan was against blind idolatry, which was prevalent during his time. His philosophy was that we must love God, and not merely create a show. He taught people to treat people equally, a king as well as a poor person. Also, he said that we must not discriminate on the basis caste or creed.

Guru "Kripa Ram Ji" Sitting on floor and Guru of Kripa Ram ji "Santdas Ji" (Sitting on chair)

RamCharan Ji Maharaj also emphasised that instead of going to various places and searching for God, one must look inside oneself. Following Maharaj Ji, it is only necessary to engage in spiritual practices, at one's own place, with proper and essential guidance of one's Guru.

== Death ==
Ram Charan died in 1799 (Vaisakha Krishna 5 in Bikram Samwat 1855).

== Works ==
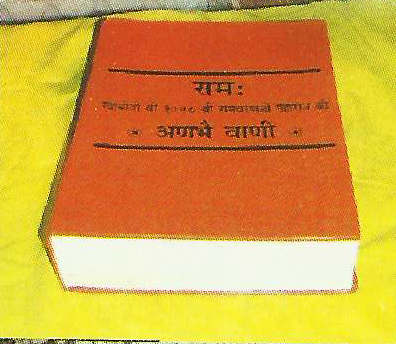
Picture of latest version of "Anubhav Vaani", the collection of works composed by Ram Charan Maharaj.

Granth Chintamani - From "Anubhav Vaani" of Swami Ji Shri Ram Charan Ji Maharaj, Founder Acharya, Ramsnehi Sampradaya. This has been recorded at Ramdwara Shahpura, district Bhilwara, Rajasthan

Swami Ram Charan Ji's works are collected in 'Vaani Ji'(वाणी जी) consisting of 36250 compositions. Each of these was spoken by him to his disciples. The first 8,000 were noted by his disciple from Bhilwara, Naval Ram Ji. His collection in "Anubhav Vaani" is considered to be biggest religious book written on the teaching of any saint. The remaining ones were noted, collected and edited by his disciple Ram Jan Ji Maharaj (who also succeeded him as the head of the 'Ramsnehi Sampradaya' after his death). In Bikram Samwat 1981 (1925 CE), the complete Vaani Ji was published for the first time under the title :'Swami Ji Ram Charan Ji Maharaj ki Anubhav Vaani', from Shahpura. The latest edition has been published by Ram Niwas Dham, Shahpura (Bhilwara), in 2005 CE.

Since this compilation, due to its large size, was found to be difficult for an individual to use, various smaller one were released, with at least one being published, by Sant LakshyaRam in Bikram Samwat 2015, on Vijayadashami day, from 'Chhatribagh' Ramdwara at Indore as 'Ram Rahasya Darshan'.

Vaani Ji contains Swamiji's teachings in the form of poetry of various types(metres). There are also 'Bhajans' with indications of the Raaga which should be preferably used for them.

== Formation of Ramsnehi Sampradaya ==
In the same year (1817 Bikram Samwat), disciple Ram Jan Ji of Ram Charan Maharaj formed "Ram Snehi Sampradaya" ( Ram Snehi Spiritual Tradition).

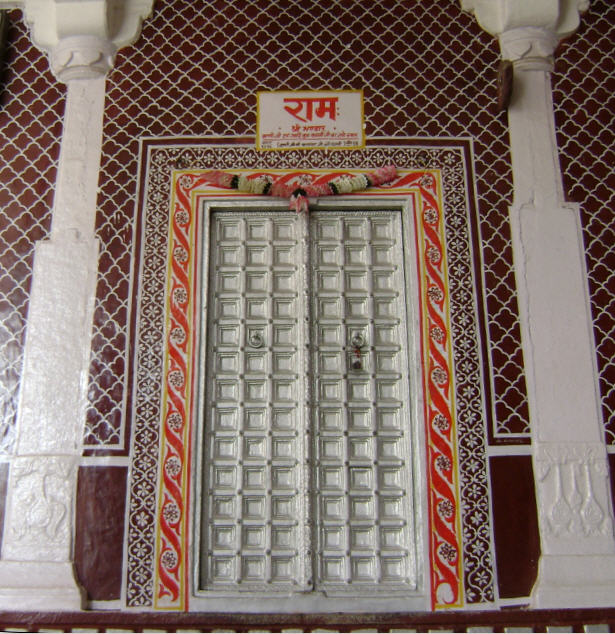
This is the room where original Speech (Anubhav Vaani) is placed.

The place of worship of believers of Swamiji is called a Ramdwara. Since Swamiji's times, the organisation has headquarters at Shahpura in Bhilwara district of Rajasthan. The Ramsnehi Sampradaya is currently led by Swami Ji Shri Ram Dayal Ji Maharaj.

== See also ==
- Ramdwara
- Shahpura, Bhilwara
- Vijayvargiya
- Ram Kishor Ji Maharaj
