= Shahpura, Bhilwara =

Shahpura
- City
- Location in Rajasthan, India
- Coordinates: 25.63°N 74.93°E
- Country: India
- State: Rajasthan
- District: Shahpura
- Established: 1706
- Founder: Bharat
- Elevation: 364 m (1,194 ft)

Population (2011)
  - Total: 30,320

Languages
  - Official: Hindi, Rajasthani
- Time zone: UTC+5:30 (IST)
- Postal code: 311404
- Vehicle registration: RJ 51
- Website: https://shahpura.rajasthan.gov.in/

Shahpura is a city and tehsil headquarter of Shahpura tehsil in Bhilwara district, in the Indian state of Rajasthan. It was made a district on 17 March 2023. But was cancelled by the state government later.

== Governance ==
Shahpura is a Municipality city and district headquarters of Shahpura district, Rajasthan. Shahpura city is divided into 35 wards for which elections are held every five years.

The municipality supplies basic amenities including water and sewerage. It is authorized to build roads and impose property taxes.

== Demographics ==
In 2011 the Shahpura municipality had a population of 30,320 of which 15,279 are males and 15,041 are females. The sex ratio is 984 females for every 1,000 males, compared to the state average of 928 to 1,000 (females to males).

Children between the ages of 0-6 number 3997 or 13.18% of the total population. The child sex ratio is around 929 females to 1,000 males, with the state average of 888 girls for every thousand boys. The literacy rate is: 77.84% of the population over 7 years are literate, higher than state average of 66.11%. For males around 87.47% are literate, while 68.14% of females are.

Shahpura municipality hosts 5,671 households.

=== Religion ===
The population is 79.83% Hindu, 18.36% Muslim, 0.03% Christian, 0.04% Sikh and 1.71% Jain.

Religion in Shahpura City
1. Hinduism (79.8%)
2. Islam (18.4%)
3. Christianity (0.03%)
4. Jainism (1.71%)
5. Sikhism (0.04%)

== Economy ==
As of 2011 9,986 residents were engaged in work or business, including 7,685 were males and 2,301 females. 89.36% were engaged in main work while 10.64% were engaged in marginal work.

== History ==
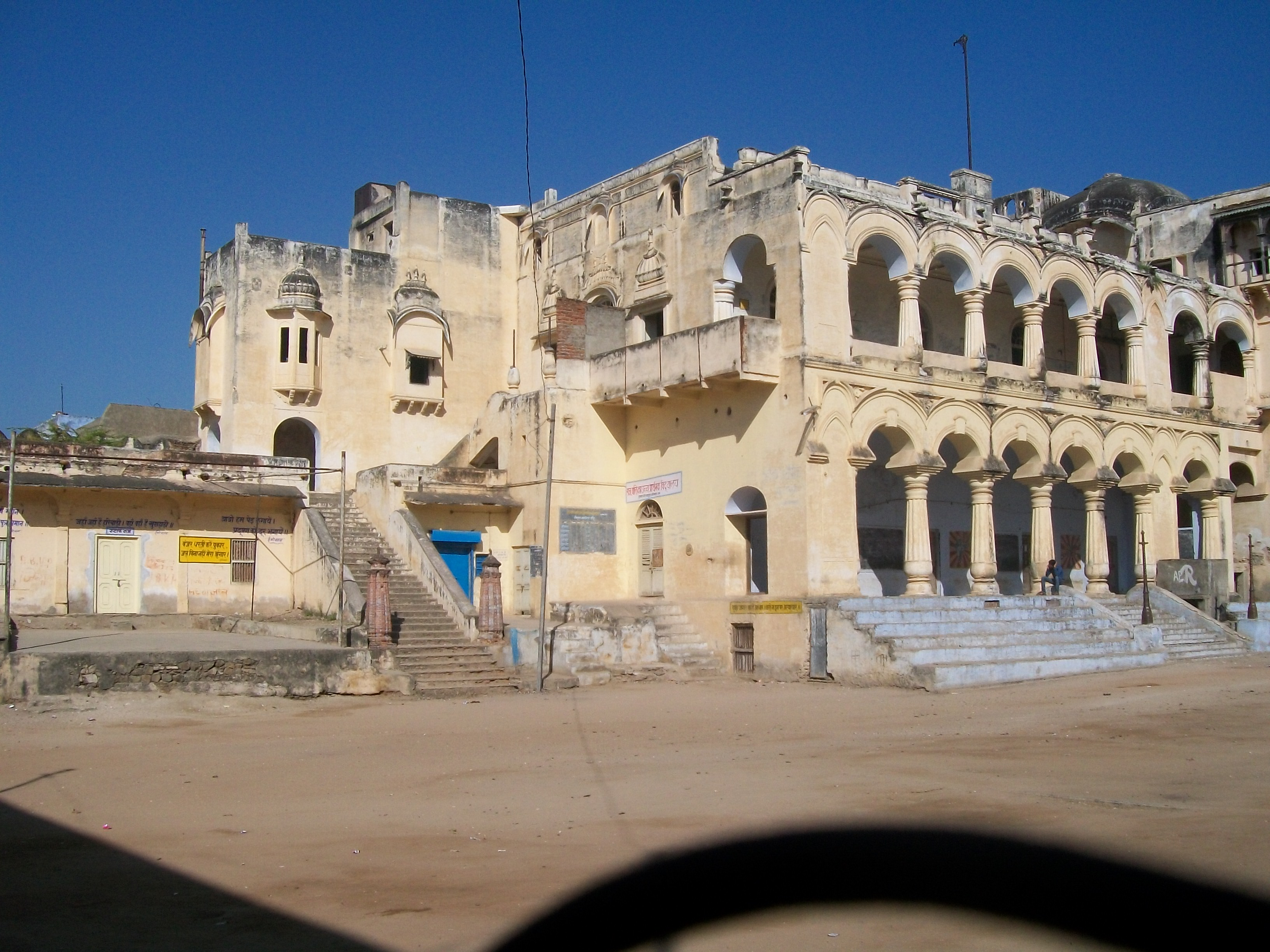
Mahalo Ka Chowk

Shahpura is known as the jagir (estate) of Surajmal, second son of Maharana Amar Singh I (r. 1597–1620); their title is 'Raja Dhiraj'.

Many of Mewar's nobles were against Maharana Ari Singh II (r. 1761–1773). Ari Singh wooed Umaid Singh to his side and gave him the Pargana Kachola (District of Kachola). Umaid died at Ujjain, fighting for the Maharana against Madhav Rao Sindhia. In 1869, Nahar Singh, who had been adopted, became the ruler of Shahpura (he had been the son of Balwant Singh of Dhanop). In 1903, the British appointed him a Knight Commander of the Order of the Indian Empire (KCIE), and entitled him to a 9-gun salute. He became a member of the Mehdraj Sabha. Later, he refused to go into the service of Maharana Fateh Singh, claiming to be an independent ruler. However, the British ruled that he would have to comply, every second year, and pay Rs. 1 Lakh to the Maharana as a penalty for not attending his court.

A municipality was established at Shahpura in 1939.

== Shrines and temples ==
The Biggest and most popular Ramdwara is situated in Shahpura.

Shahpura is a place of pilgrimage for the followers of the Ram Snehi sect. They have a shrine in the town called Ramdwara. The chief priest there is the head of the sect. Pilgrims from across the world visit the shrine. A fair called Phooldol Mela continues for five days after Holi. by Ramdwara Temple.

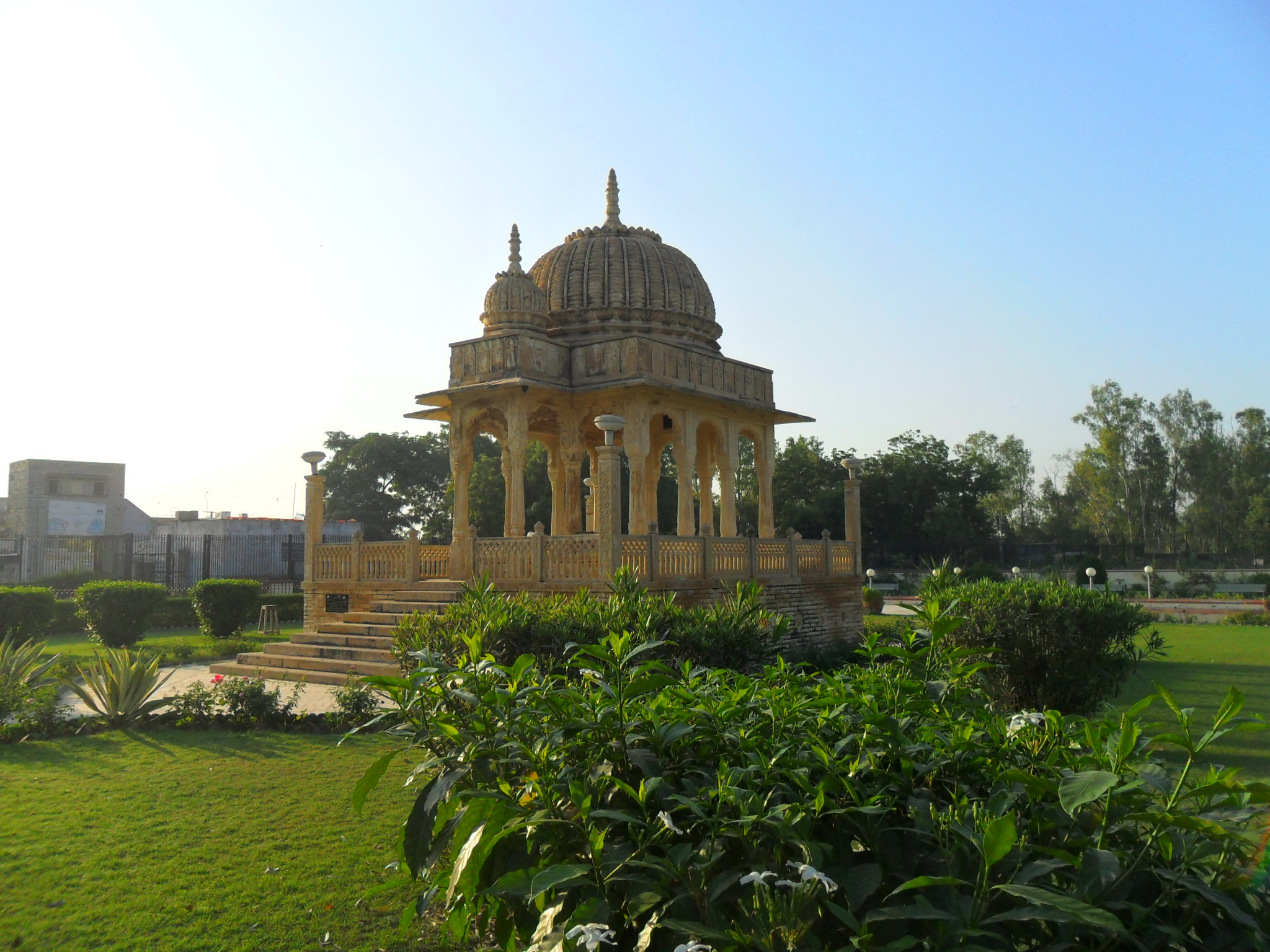
This is the samadhi of the 13th head of Ramsnehi Sampradaya, Swami Ji Shri Ramkishorji Maharaj. It is located in Ramniwas Dham, Shahpura, Bhilwara

The temple of Charbhuja Nath is situated in the middle of the city, as well as a Hanuman temple called Balaji ki Chatri.

Eight Prachin Jain temples including four Swetamber Sampradaya and four Digamber Sampradaya.
