= Khatik Mohalla =

Khatik Mohalla is the name of a village or locality where Hindu Khatik people live and may refer to:

- Khatik Mohalla (Jabalpur), Madhya Pradesh
- Khatik Mohalla (Meerut), Uttar Pradesh
- Khatik Mohalla (Mathura Cantt), Uttar Pradesh
- Khatik Mohalla (Shahpura), see Khatik Mohalla Street, Rajasthan

== See also ==
- Khatik, an ethnic group
- Khatik (surname)
