= Khatik (surname) =

Rajoria

खटीक
- Language: Hindi, English, Telugu

Origin
- Language: Hindi
- Origin: India
- Region of origin: India, Pakistan, Nepal

Other names
- Variant forms: Khateek, खटिक

Khatik (खटीक) is an Indian surname, mostly used in the Khatik caste. The name is derived from the Sanskrit word khattka or kautik meaning butcher or hunter. Notable people with the surname include:

- Amar Singh Khatik, Member of the Legislative Assembly of Uttar Pradesh
- Banshi Lal Khatik, Member of Legislative Assembly, Rajsamand, Rajasthan
- Harishankar Khatik, Member of Legislative Assembly, Jatara
- Ramesh Prasad Khatik, Member of Legislative Assembly, Karera, Madhya Pradesh
- Shakuntala Khatik, Member of Legislative Assembly
- Uma Devi Khatik, Member of Legislative Assembly, Hatta, Madhya Pradesh
- Virendra Kumar Khatik, Pro tem Speaker, 7 times, Member of Parliament, Tikamgarh, Madhya Pradesh
- Dinesh Khatik, Member of 17th Legislative Assembly, Hastinapur, Uttar Pradesh
- Atul Khatik, former MLA, Hastinapur
- Munshilal Khatik, State cabinet minister, Madhya Pradesh.
- Uttamchand Khatik former MLA
- Shankar Lal Khatik former MP, Sagar
- Ganeshram Khatik, former MLA, Pathariya
- Kamta Prasad Khatik, MLA, Kolaras
- Omprakash Khatik, 3 times MLA, Kolaras
- Dariyav Khatik, former MLA, Jhajjar
