= Bandhaji =

Jain tirtha

Coordinates: 25.0403°N 78.74304°E

Shri Bandhaji

Religion
- Affiliation: Jainism
- Deity: Ajitnatha
- Festival: Mahavir Jayanti

Location
- Location: Tikamgarh district, Madhya Pradesh, India
- Interactive map of Shri Bandhaji

Architecture
- Established: 18th Century
- Temple: 1

Bandhaji is a historic Jain tirtha about 35 km from Tikamgarh.

== History ==
The 900 year old black colored idol of principal deity Bhagwan Ajitnatha is installed in a basement of Shri Bandhaji Atishaya Kshetra. According to historical and archeological evidence available this Kshetra seems to be more than 1,500 years old.

The seven Bhonyare (Basements) are quite famous in ‘Bundelkhand’. They are situated in ‘Pava’, ‘Deogarh’, ‘Seron’, ‘Karguvan’, ‘Bandha’, ‘Papora’ and ‘Thuvon’. It is said that these seven Basements were constructed by two brothers namely Devpat and Khevpat. The two ancient spired temples are also constructed here which are worth seeing from the point of view of art and magnificence.

This Kshetra is quite wealthy from the point of view of archeology. The important matter related to Jainism is scattered anywhere in fields, pounds, ancient forts and in old temples. It seems that this place was developed during the time of Chandel Kings and Bhonyare (Basement) constructed during the time of Muslim rulers to keep idols safe.

== Main Temple & Idol ==
At Atishaya Kshetra Bandhaji, the idol of principal deity Bhagwan Ajitnath is installed in ancient Bhonyara. It was created and reverenced in 1142 (Samvat 1199). It is a black colored 2.5 feet high Padmasana idol. On both sides of this idol are several 2 feet high Kayotsarga idols of Bhagwan Adinath and Bhagwan Sambhavnath are installed respectively. These idols were both reverenced in 1152 (Samvat 1209). The other idols of Bhagwan Adinath, Sambhavnath and Neminath are also installed here. The huge spired temple is built near Bhonyara and it is 65 feet high. This temple was constructed in dense forest. Built in 18th century, this temple is quite artistic. There is one small temple near the spired temple. The small temple was possibly a ‘Math’ in ancient times and later it was converted into a small temple. Like ‘Gandhkuti’ it is quite artistic. There are 12 doors in this altar and ‘Dharmachakra’ is created in center of this temple.

== See also ==
- Paporaji
- Aharji
