= Paporaji =

Jain Temple in Madhya Pradesh

Paporaji Jain Tirth
- Shri Jain Atishaya Kshetra Paporaji
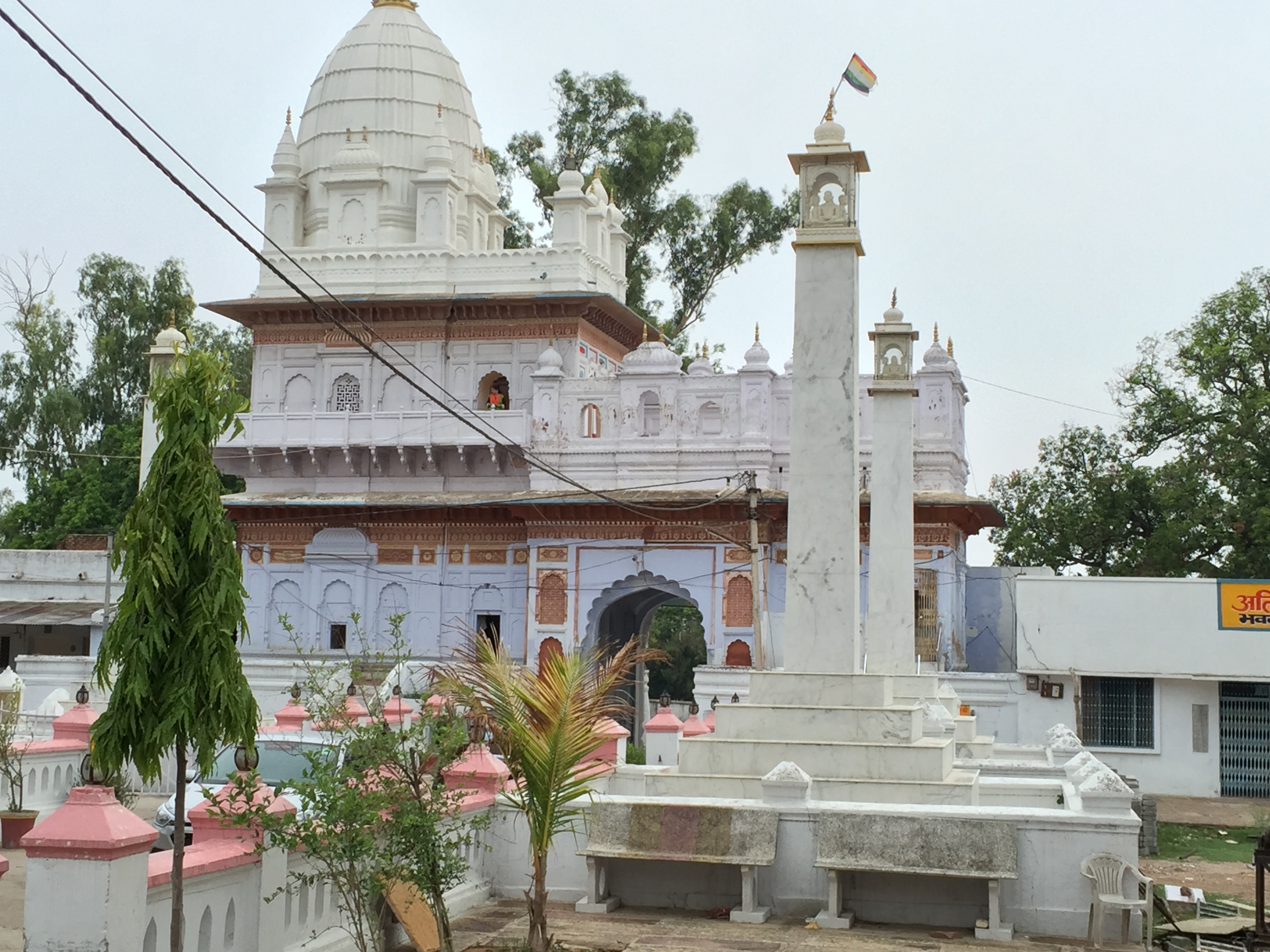
- Paporaji Jain Tirth

- Location within Madhya Pradesh

Religion
- Affiliation: Jainism
- Deity: Adinath
- Festival: Annual Mela Kartik Sudi 13-15
- Governing body: Shri Dig. Jain Atishaya Kshetra Papouraji Managing Committee

Location
- Location: Tikamgarh, Tikamgarh district, Madhya Pradesh
- Coordinates: 24°44′50″N 78°50′00″E

Architecture
- Established: 12th century
- Temple: 108

Paporaji, also called Pampapur, a temple site in Madhya Pradesh, India, 5 km east of Tikamgarh. The site is a center for the Jain religion. This is an atishaya kshetra ("miraculous holy place"), with 108 shrines.

== History ==
Poporaji is more than eight hundred years old. The site has two basements; one of them has three idols. The idol of Bhagwan Adinath is made of shining black stone and is two feet and eight inches in height. Idols inside are also in same color and stone. Two of the three Adinath idols were installed in V.S. 1202 (AD 1145) according to the inscriptions on them and are oldest at this Kshetra.

In 1783, the ruler of Orchha Vikramajit (1776–1817) shifted his capital from Orchha to Tehri and renamed it Tikamgarh, which is in the vicinity of Papora. An inscription of Vikrama 1840 (AD 1784) suggests that the site then had emerged as a tirtha. Motilal Varni (an associate of Ganesh Varni), had established a religious school which has produced several distinguished scholars like Darbari Lal Kothia. He had donated his own collection of handwritten manuscripts to the school.

== Architecture ==
The oldest temples mainly from 18th and 19th century, are in the part termed Prachina Samucchaya, which includes two underground chambers (bhoyras) from the 12th century. In 1860 AD, a unique cluster of 24 temples was constructed. At the same time the chariot-shaped temple that serves as the grand entrance gate was constructed. A number of temples were constructed in 1965. Many temples have notable old and modern wall paintings. Temple construction has gradually continues, with a circular Bahubali temple being among the recent ones.

Prayers and worship take place in the temple basement and in Chandraprabhu Mandir, with an idol dated samvat 1524 that is regarded to be helpful in materializing the desires of pilgrims. The temple of Lord Parshvanath contains a unique image of Padmavati devi.

In addition to the 108 temples, there exists a school and a library founded by Motilal Varni, an Udasina Ashrama and a hostel for the students. Four dharmashalas, a rest house and a dining hall is also in the tirth kshetra compound.

Atishaya – Here exists an ancient little pond. It is said that when pilgrims dropped a paper listing of required utensils in this pond, the utensils were received from the pond and used by the pilgrims. After use and cleaning, these utensils were returned to the pond and utensils thus disappeared back into the water. This miracle is not seen nowadays because one person did not return the utensils received from the pond.

Here is a well known as ‘Patrakhan Well’. It is said that an old woman organized a party on the completion of a big temple (Temple No.-1) in samvat 1872. Suddenly the water of the well was finished and lack of water for guests was felt. Then that old women entered the well and reached the bottom. Then as she started her heartfelt prayers, water began flowing in the well and as the old woman was lifted from the well, the level of water also increased simultaneously. Thus the honor of that old sacred woman was kept. This well still exists near the mess of school here.

== Administration ==
The administration and day-to-day activities of Paporaji are controlled by the Shri Digamber Jain Atishay Kshetra Paporaji Prabhandhkarini Committee. The committee is renewed every five years by general election.

== Gallery ==
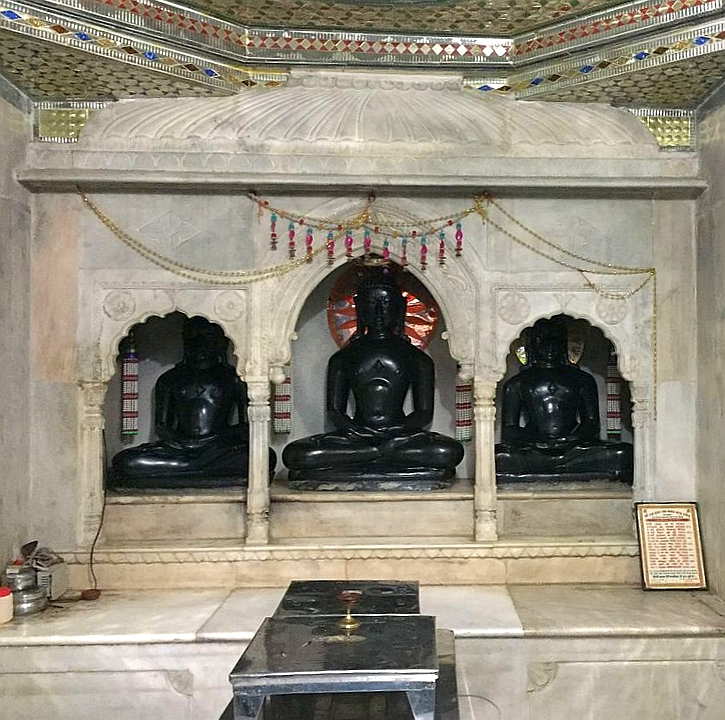
Three historical idols of Lord Adinath belonging to 1145(VS 1202) in the underground chamber

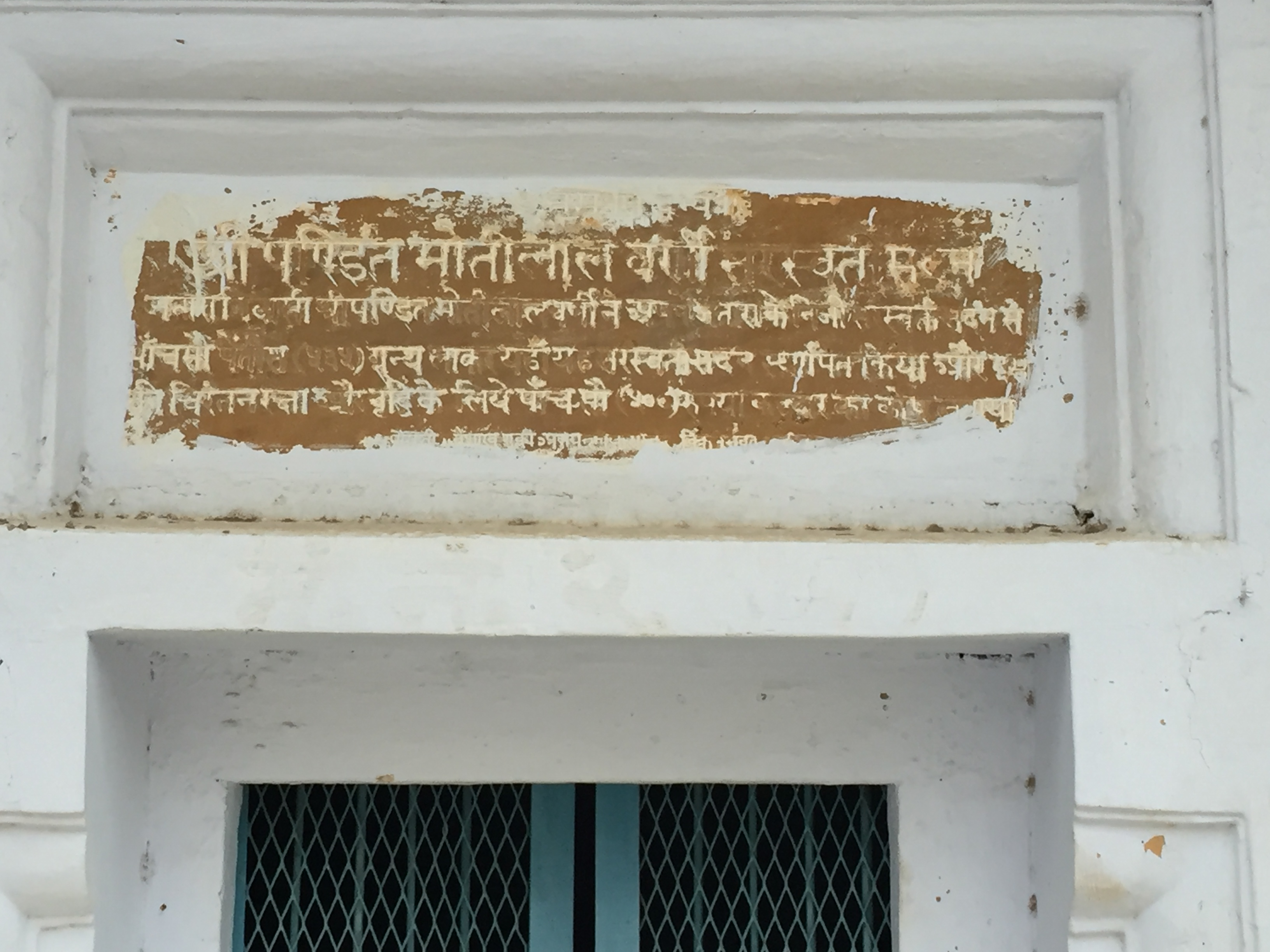
Motilal Varni Sarasvati Sadan Plaque

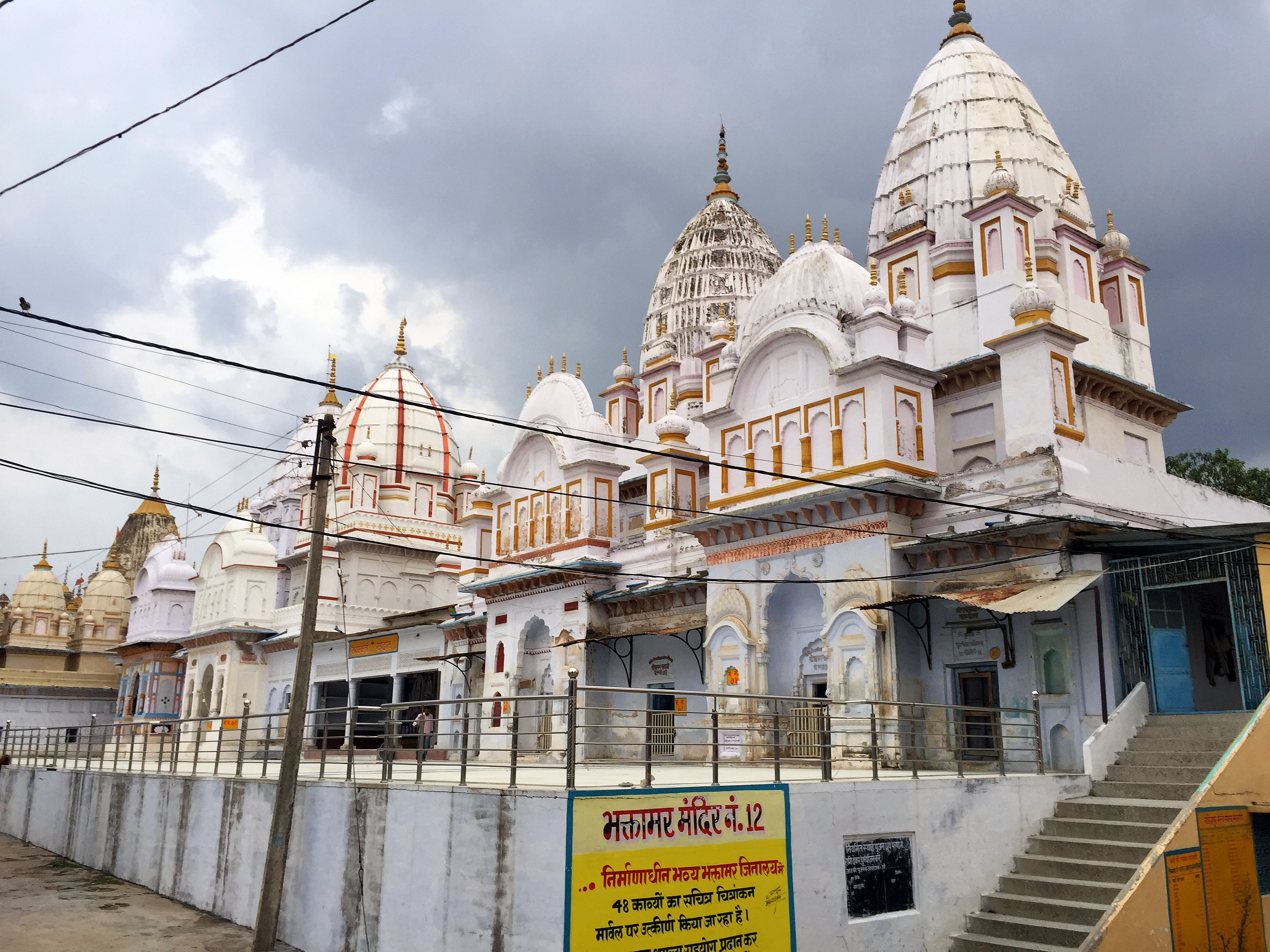
Some of the temples at Paporaji

== See also ==
- Bandhaji
- Aharji
- Nainagiri
- Navagarh
- badagaon
