= Banshi Lal Khatik =

Indian politician

Banshi Lal Khatik Ex MLA

Member of the Legislative Assembly
- In office 2003–2008
- Constituency: Rajsamand (Lok Sabha constituency)

Personal details
- Born: 1 May 1967 (age 59) Lawa sardargarh, Rajsamand, Rajasthan
- Party: Bhartiya Janata Party
- Occupation: Politician
- Profession: Farmer & politician

Banshi Lal Khatik is an Indian politician and a Member of the Legislative Assembly of India. He represents the Rajsamand (SC) constituency of Rajasthan and is a member of the Bhartiya Janata Party political party.

== Early life and education ==
Banshi Lal Khatik was born in a Hindu Khatik family in Lawa sardagargh, Rajasthan.

== Political career ==
Banshi Lal has been a MLA for one term. Before making his debut in politics he was a social activist in Rashtriya Swayamsevak Sangh. He represented the Rajsamand constituency and is a member of the Bhartiya Janata Party political party. He defeated Banshi Lal Gahlot (INC) with total votes 63294 (55.91%)
