= Bhonyra =

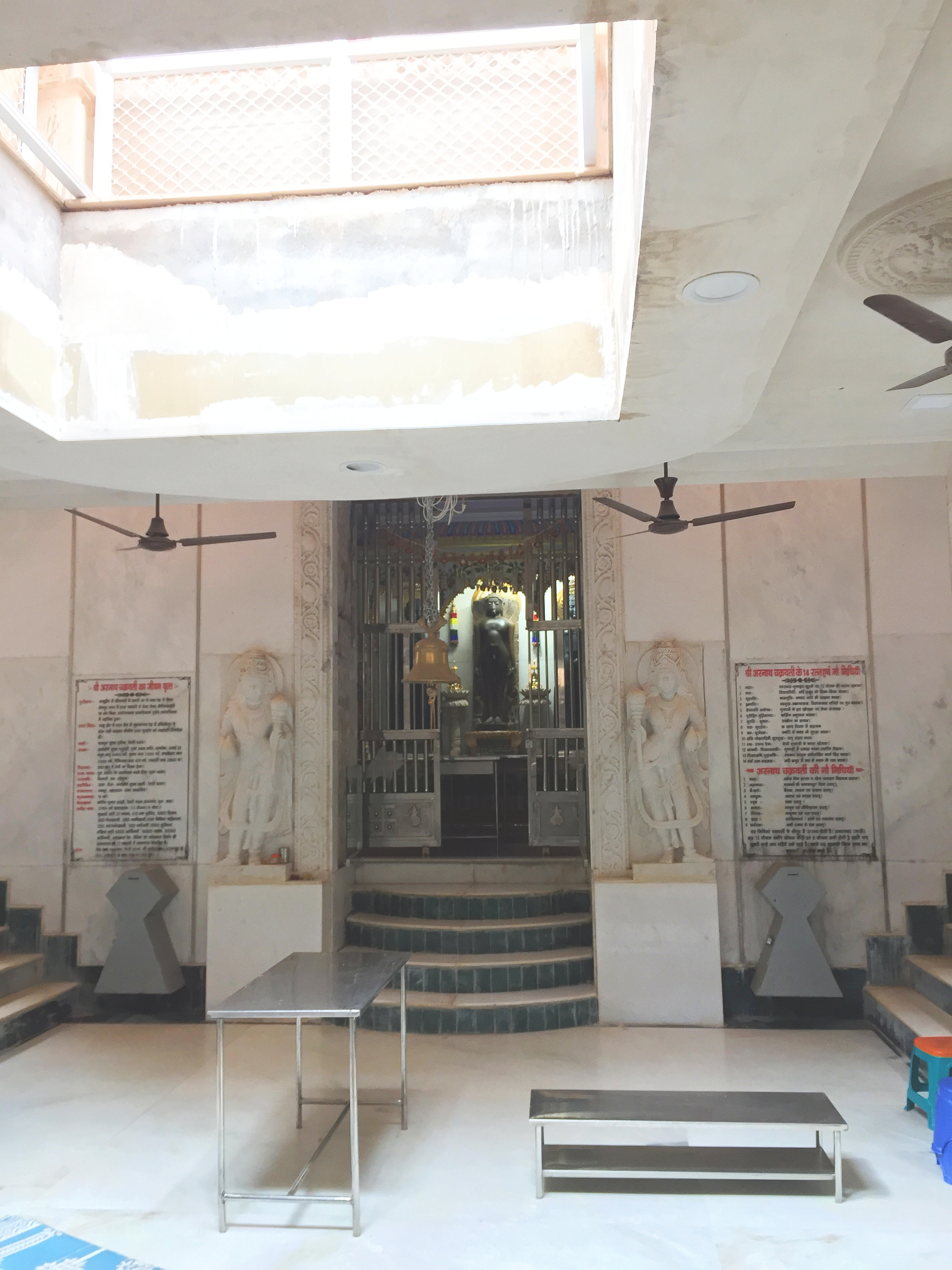
Underground chamber in Navagarh discovered in 1950s

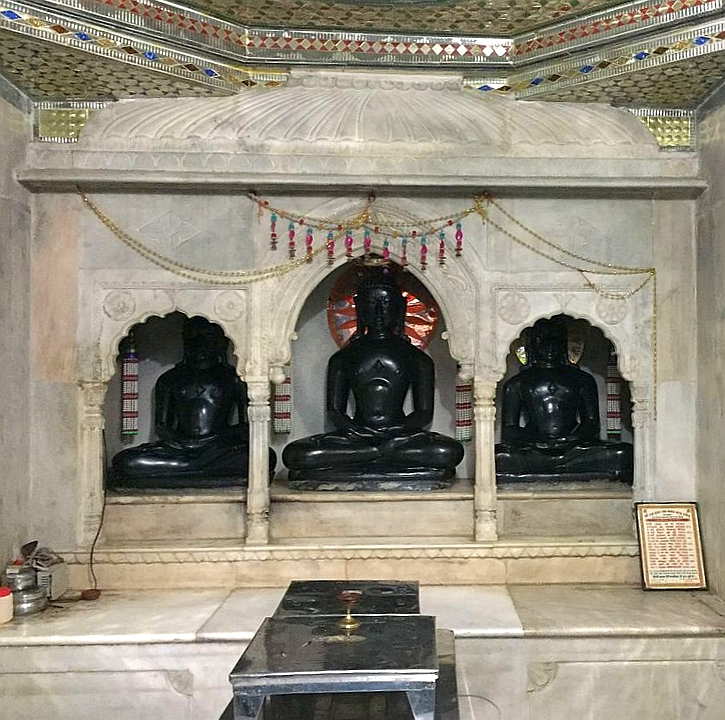
Three historical idols of Lord Adinath belonging to 1145(VS 1202) in the underground chamber at Paporaji

In Jainism, a Bhonyra (Prakrit languages: भोंयरा Bhōnyarā, Sanskrit: भूमिगृह Bhūmigr̥ha) is an underground chamber with Jain images. In the past, it was used to conceal sacred idols during times of disturbance.

There are several Jain temples in Bundelkhand that existed as a concealed bhonyra chamber for several centuries before being rediscovered.

In 2001, an entire Jain temple was found beneath a mound known as Rajgadhi Timbo at Umta, Gujarat. It was apparently buried to protect it from the destruction about 800 years ago.

In some regions, it became a common practice to build a bhonyra attached to the temple. Naya Mandir in Delhi has a concealed chamber. A visitor in 1876 described it:

In Delhi I found a Jain temple which was wholly unknown to Europeans well acquainted with the city; and on prosecuting inquiry, I got its priest to open to me a concealed chamber containing large statues of several of the Tirthankaras richly ornamented.

The chamber has now been given the form of a cave, suitable for peaceful meditation by visiting Jain monks.

A few years ago, several Jain idols were rediscovered in a bhonyara in Sanghiji temple, Sanganer in Rajasthan.

Some of the Jain temples in Ahmedabad have an underground chamber.

== See also ==
- Raja Harsukh Rai
- Jainism in Delhi
- Sanganer
- Hansi
- Chausa hoard
