= Navagarh Tirth =

Pilgrimage site in Uttar Pradesh, India

Jain Atishaya Kshetra Navagarh
- नवागढ
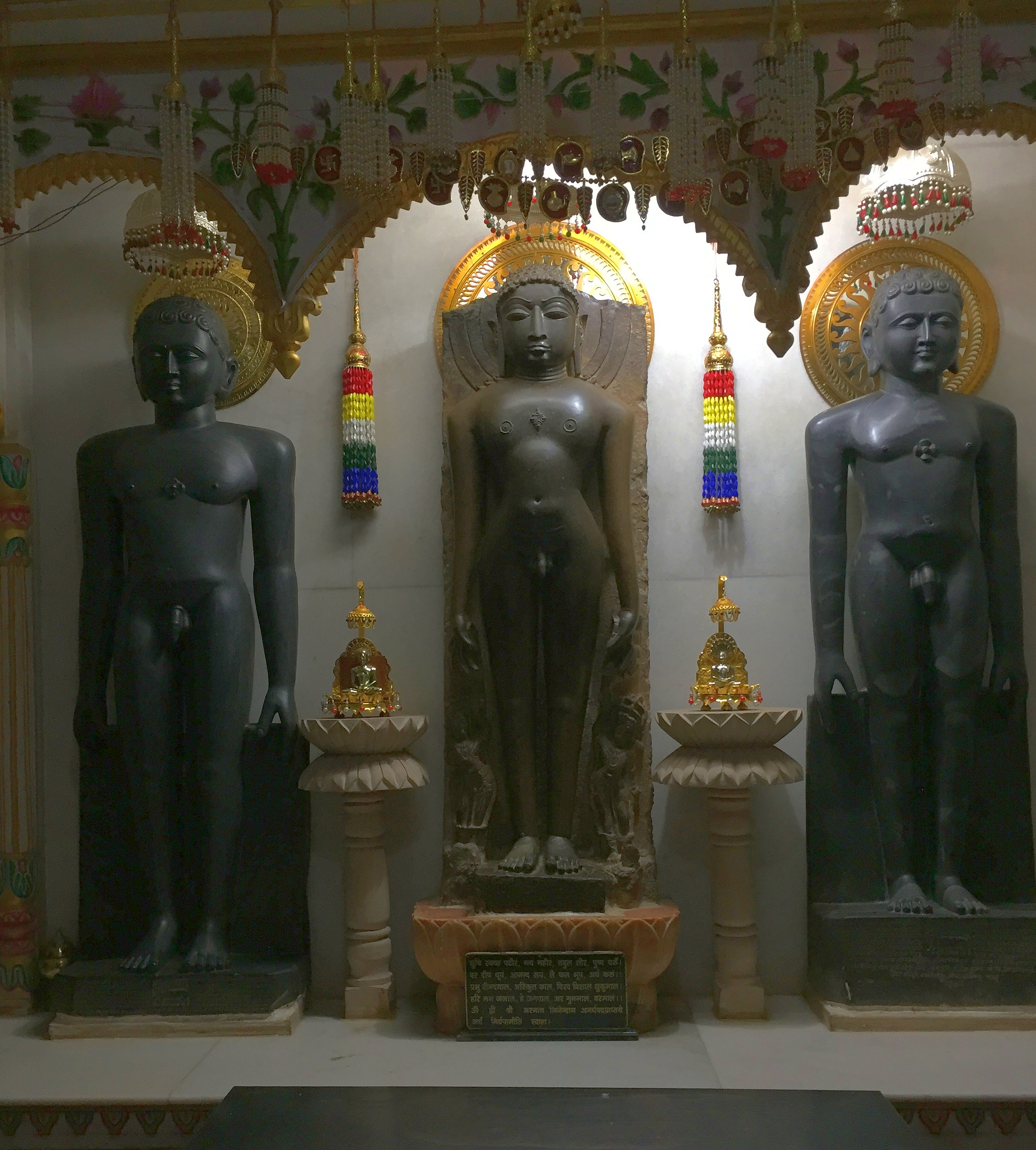
- Lord Aranatha in Navagarh Bhonyra, Chandella Period

Religion
- Affiliation: Jainism
- Deity: Aranatha
- Festival: Mahavir Jayanti

Location
- Location: Lalitpur, Uttar Pradesh
- Interactive map of Jain Atishaya Kshetra Navagarh
- Coordinates: 24.556°N 78.935°E

Architecture
- Established: 12th century
- Temple: 1

Navagarh is a Jain Tirth (pilgrimage site for Jainism) in India. It is located at the Nabai village near Sojna in central India in Uttar Pradesh, just across the border from Madhya Pradesh. It is 65 km east from Lalitpur and 110 km north from Sagar. This ancient cite was excavated in 1959. It is the only tirth in India where the main deity is the ancient image of Lord Aranatha, preserved in the ancient underground chamber.

== Navagarh Tirth ==
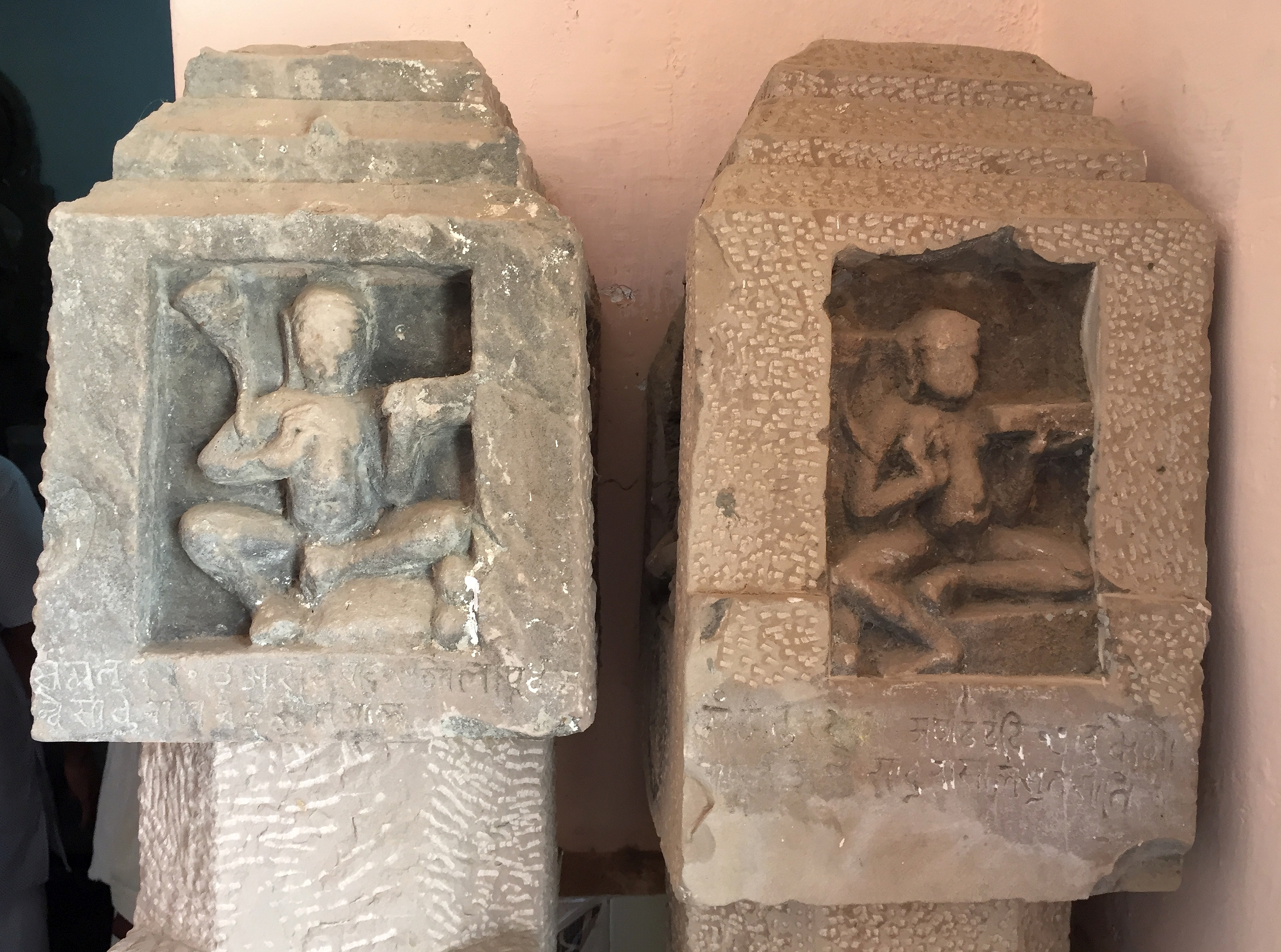
Sojna Stambhas with Upadhyaya images

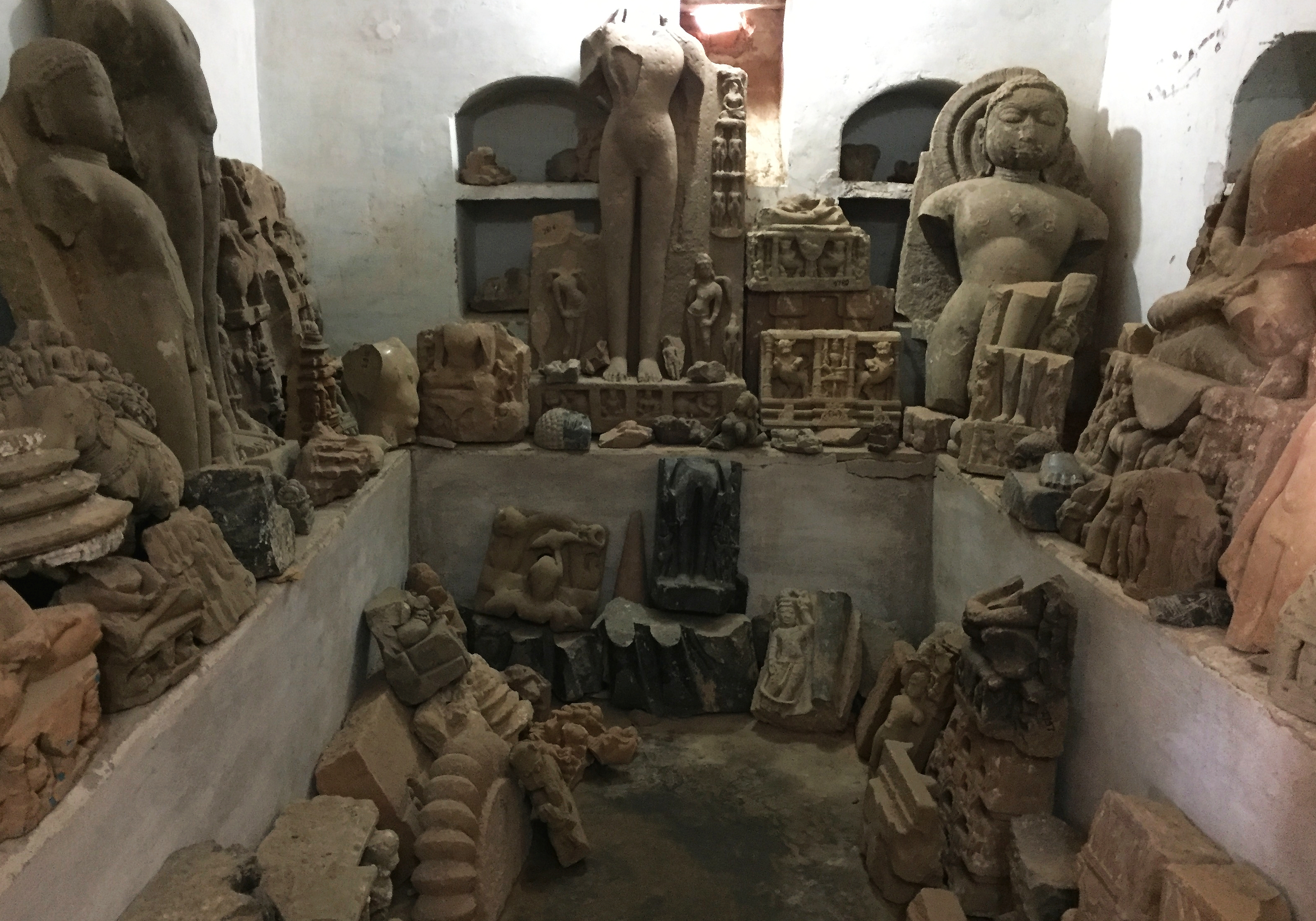
Ancient artifacts in the sangrahalaya

Navagarh is a place of natural beauty being surrounded by rocky wilderness. It is famous for the crafted life size image of Lord (Aranatha) in standing (Kayotsarga) posture. It is in the Chandela style and finely polished. It does not have an inscription, but a fragment of a Shantinatha image from the same chamber has the date samvat 1202.

There are nearby prehistoric rock shelters where Jain monks used to meditate. Some of them contain prehistoric drawings.

== Discovery and development ==
In 1940s the site was noted as a collection of ruined sculptures and a set of columns inscribed with Samvat 1203 in a nearby village. There was a platform under a tree with a large number of ancient Jain historical relics. It was explored by Pt. Gulabchandra Pushpa, an Ayurvedic physician (later famous as a Pratishthacharya) while visiting nearby Mainwar village. The exploration yielded the image of Lord Arnath in an underground chamber, along with a number of intact as well as damages idols. In 1959, systematic development was initiated with the advice of note Jain archaeology expert Niraj Jain of Satna. Since the spot was in a forest, it was proposed that the main image should be transported to nearby town, however it was opposed by local villagers. In 1990, an initial structure was built with a boundary wall. Gajrath festivals organized in 1985 and 2011.

It was decided that the image of Lord Arnath should be kept in the same underground chamber (Bhonyra) which was accessible only though narrow staircases. A spacious chamber was excavated in front of the bhonyra allowing a large space for the worshippers.

The tirth has been visited by Acharyas Vidyasagar, Vardhmansagar, Devnandi, Padmanandi, Viragsagar, Gyansagar, Vishuddhasagar, vibhavasagar as well as a number of other munis and aryikas.

== Historical statues and inscriptions ==
In addition to the bhonyra, the compound includes two additional shrines with modern and ancient images and a sangrahalaya, where a large number of historical idols and fragments are preserved. These include idols of Lord Adinath and Lord Parshvanath from early middle age (500-1000 AD). Lower fragment of a finely polished black schist Mahavira image dated samvat 1195 (1138 AD) mentions Golapurva Mahichandra, his son Delhan and their family members. Four columns dated samvat 1202 once reused in a reservoir at Sojna are also preserved.

== Development ==
The tirth has been developed by Pt. Gulabchandra Pushpa, who has served as a Pratishthacharya for numerous Jain temple installations, and is now overseen by his son Br. Jaikumar Jain Nishant, who is also a noted Pratishthacharya.

== Facilities ==
There are 20 rooms in the Hospice (Dharmashala). There is a Canteen (Bhojanshala) available for delicious food.

== Location and nearby tirths ==
Atishaya Kshetra: Paporaji 30 km, Siddha Kshetra Aharji 55 km, Siddha Kshetra Drongiri 55 km, Siddha Kshetra Badagaon 15 km.

== Gallery ==
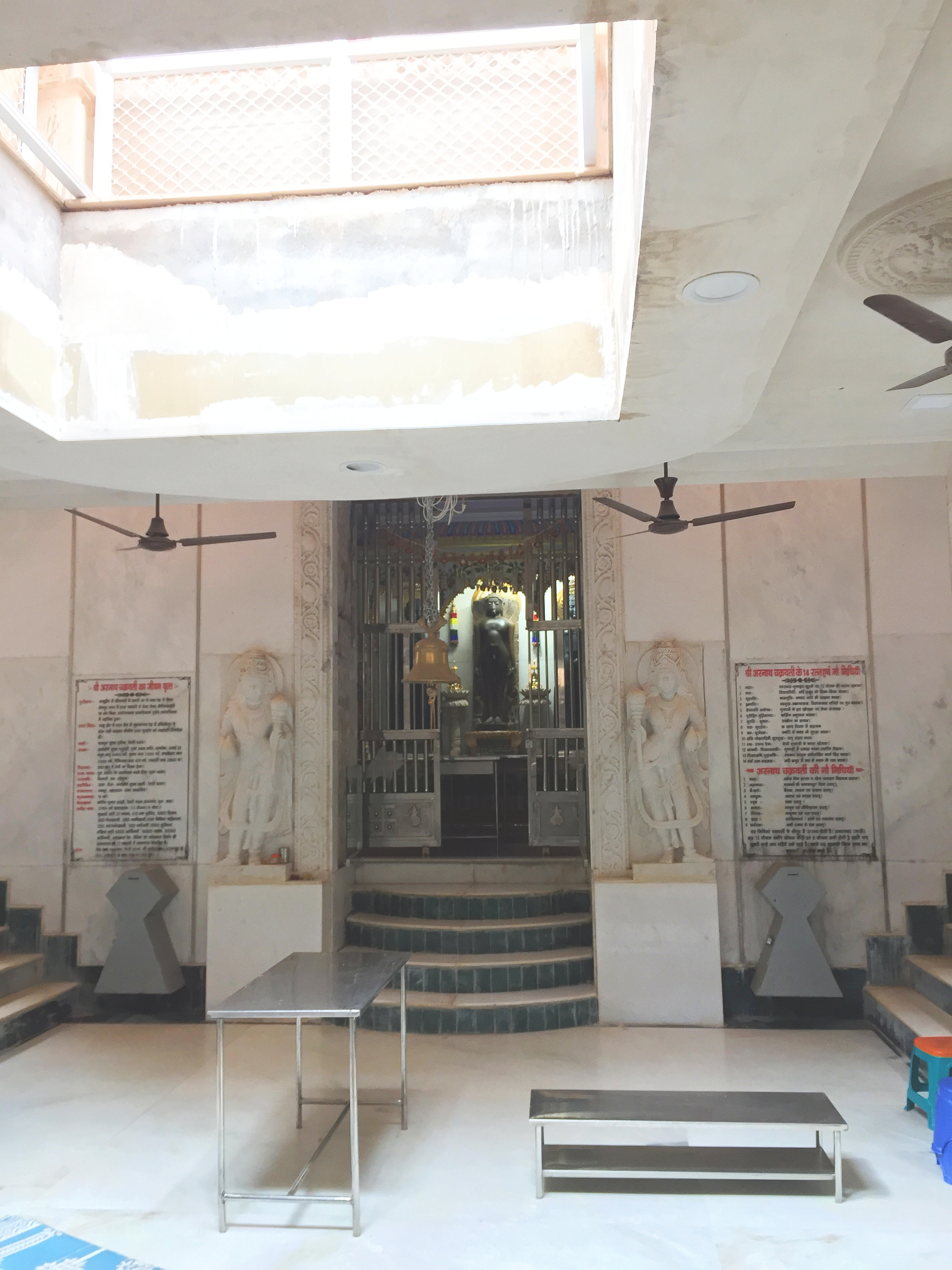
Underground chamber in Navagarh

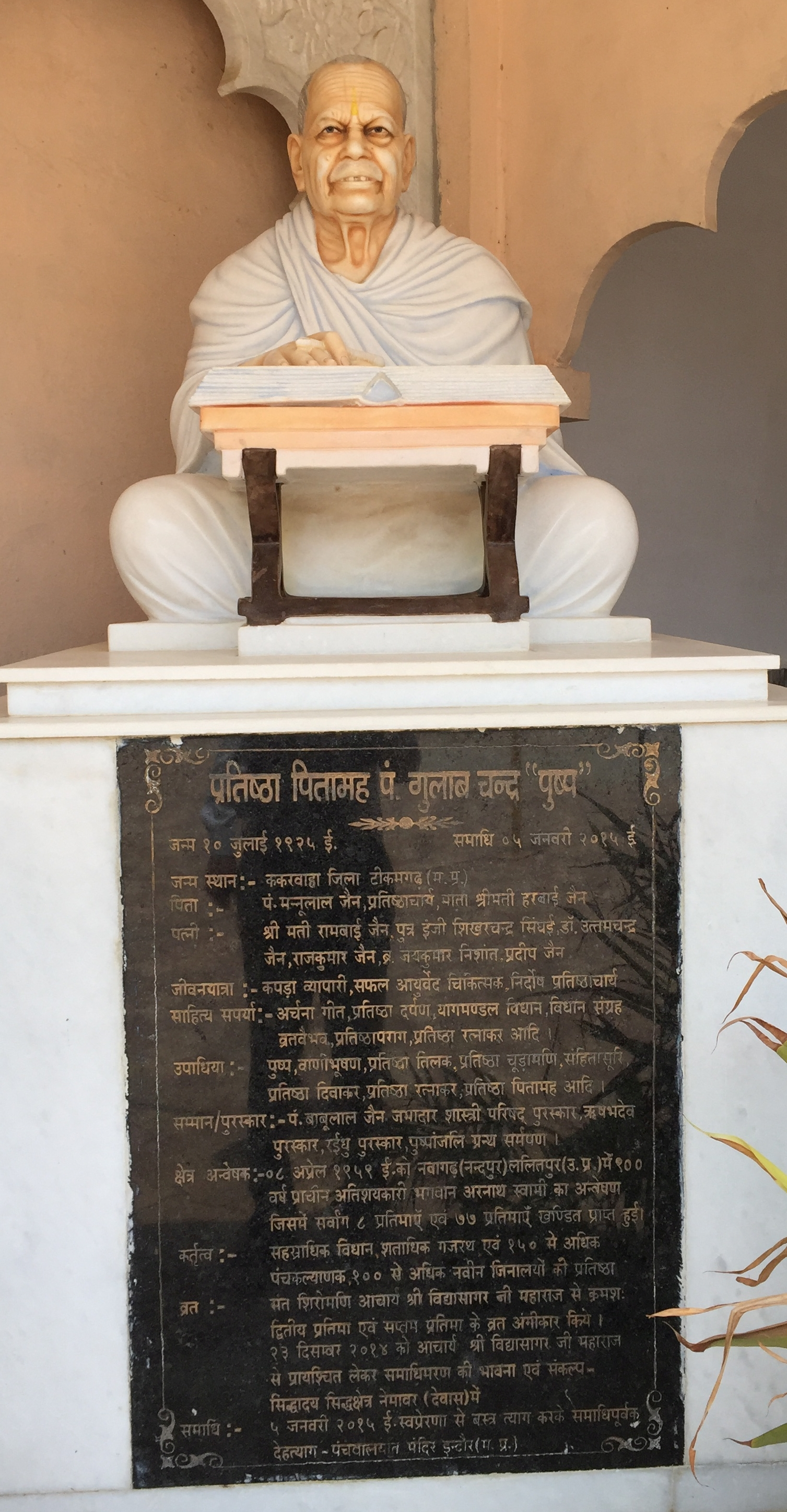
Bust of Pratistha Pitamah Gulabchandra Pushpa, founder and developer

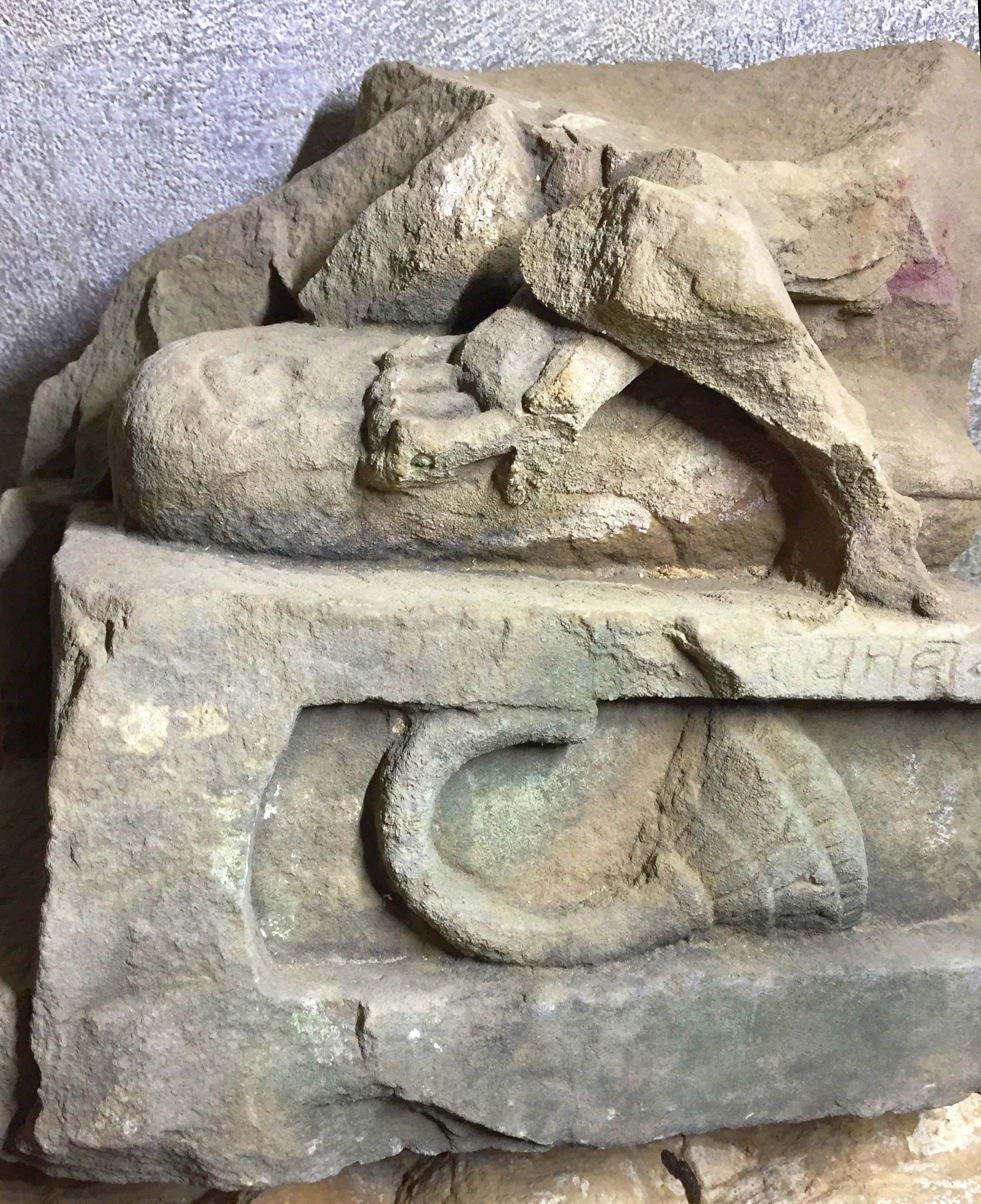
Fragment with inscription mentioning a Bhattaraka with a pichchhi

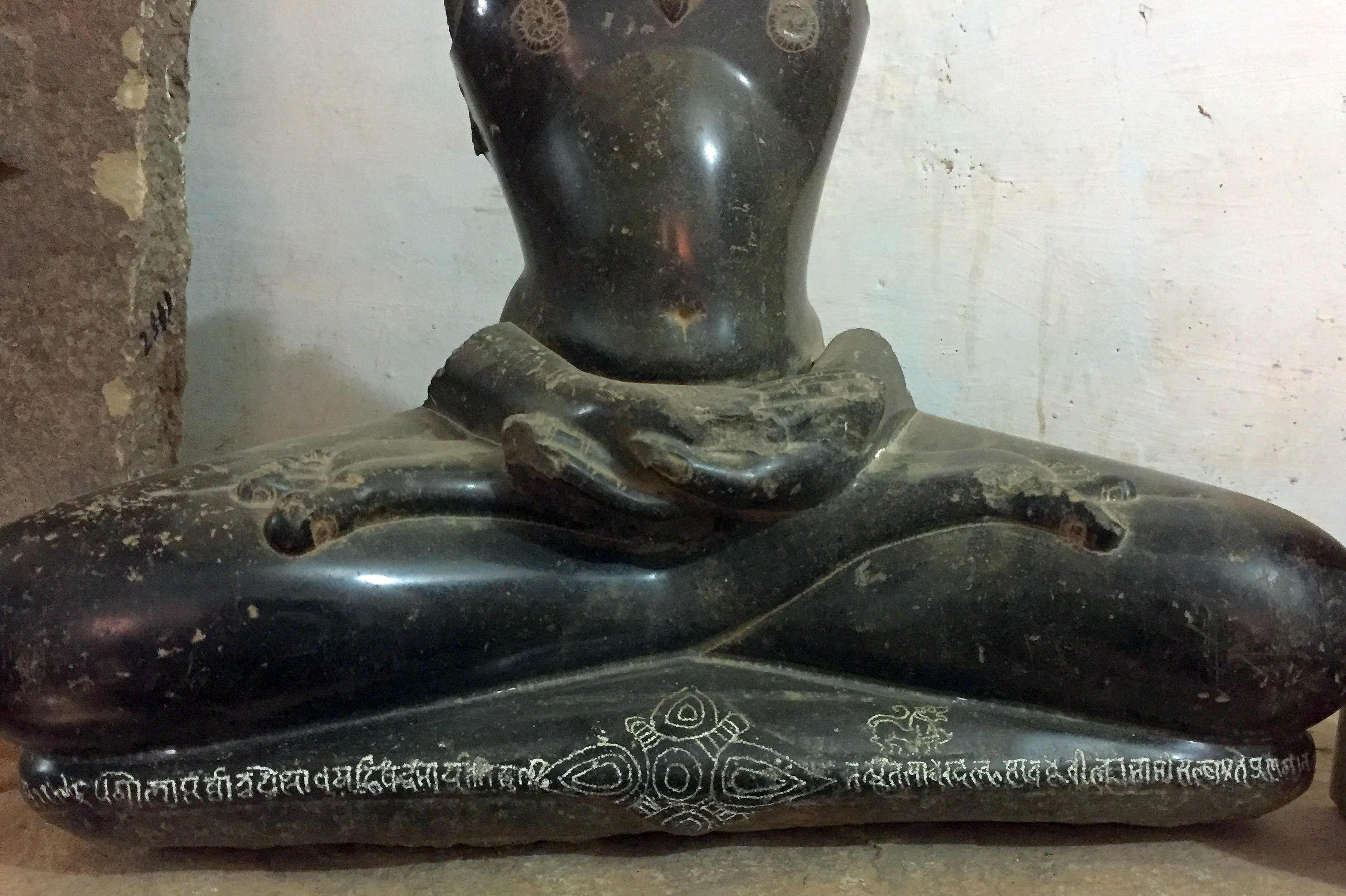
Mahavira image installed by Golapurva Mahichandra

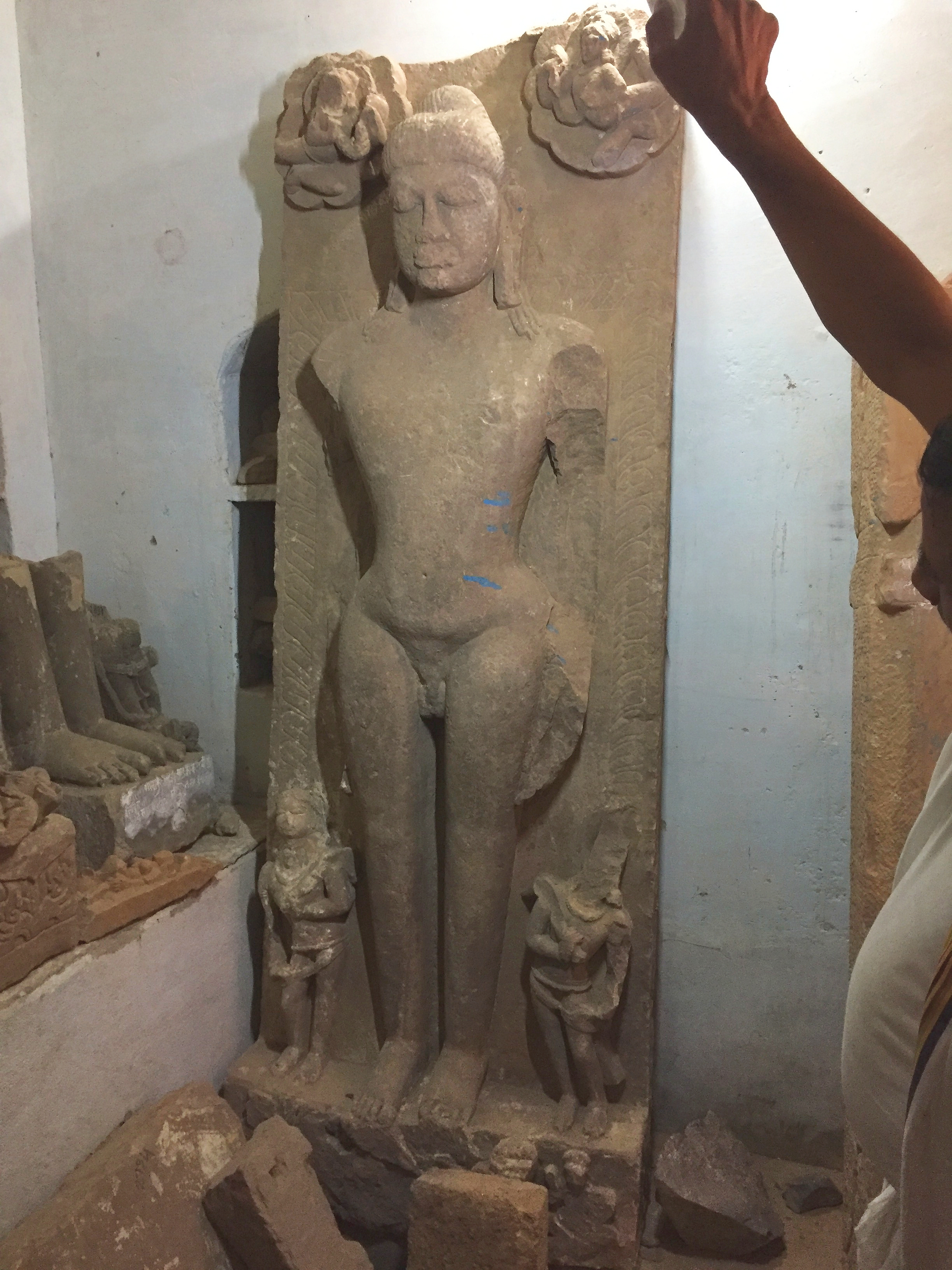
Adinath image in Navagarh from early Middle age

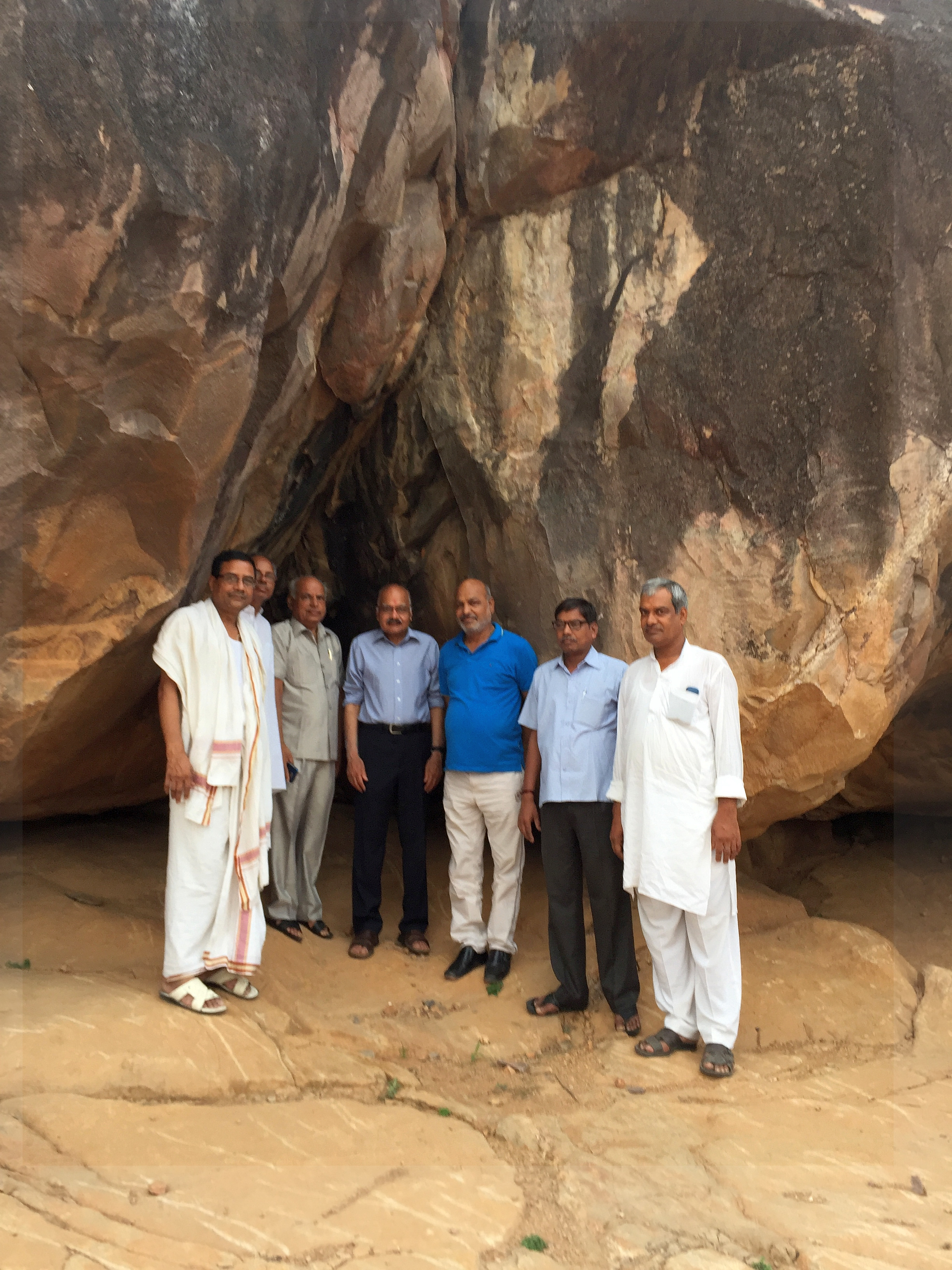
Rock Shelter used by Jain monks at Navagarh

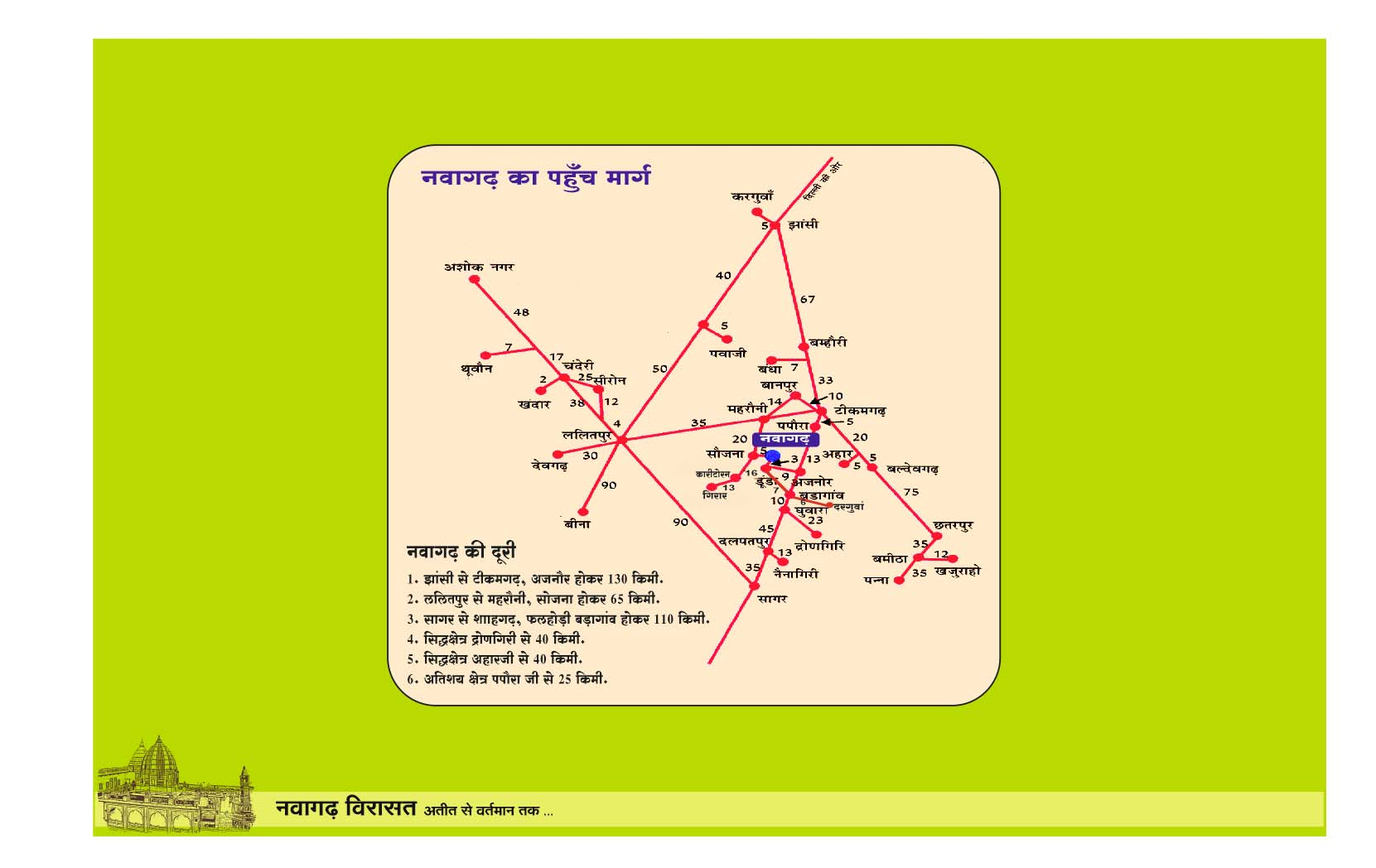
Route to reach Navagarh Atishaya Kshetra

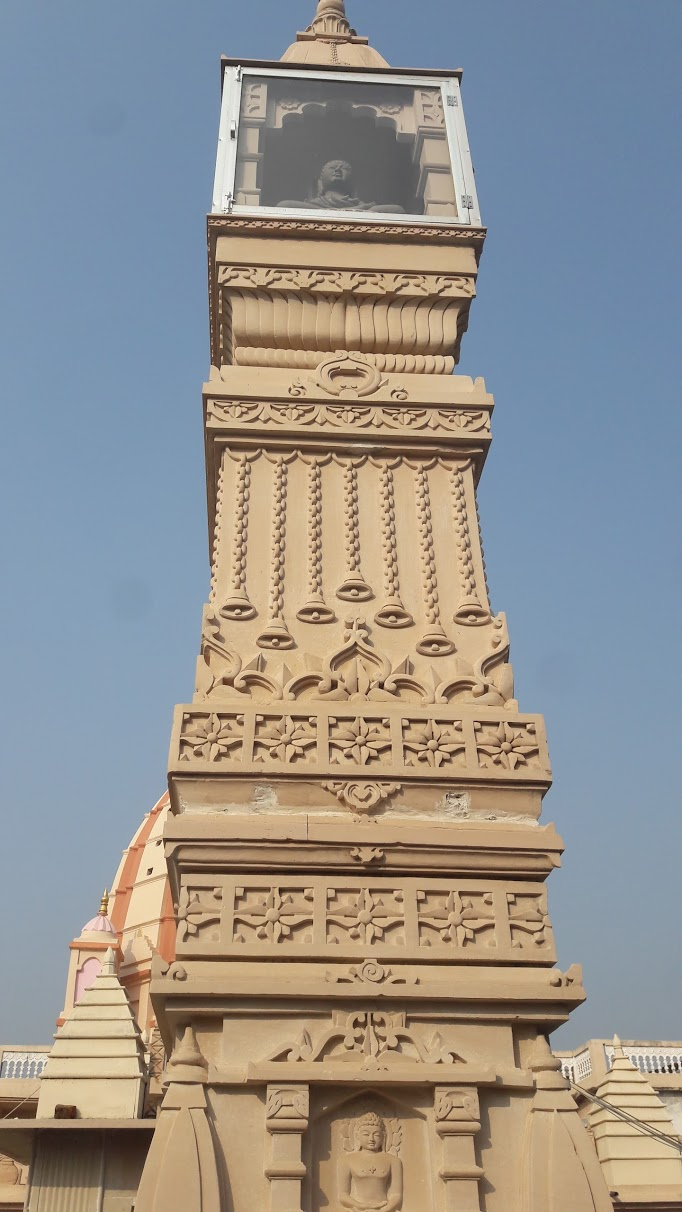
Honorific(MaanStambh) Navagarh Teerth

== See also ==
- Tirtha
- Jainism in Bundelkhand
