= Asgari Bai =

- Born: 25 August 1918; Bijawar, Chhatarpur
- Origin: Chhatarpur district, Madhya Pradesh, India
- Died: 9 August 2006 (aged 87) Tikamgarh, Madhya Pradesh
- Genres: Hindustani classical music, Mewati Gharana
- Occupation: Classical Vocalist
- Years active: 1937–2005

Asgari Bai (25 August 1918 – 9 August 2006) was an Indian Dhrupad singer. She was a recipient of Padma Shri, Tansen Samman, Academy Samman and Shikhar Samman.

== Early life and career ==
Asgari Bai was born in Bijawar, Chhatarpur, to a family of court singers. Her mother, Nazir Begum, was a court singer for the Bijawar royal family, and her grandmother, Balayat Bibi, was a court singer for the Ajaigarh princely state.

She had come with her mother, Nazeera Begum, to Tikamgarh, where at age eight, she started her musical training under Ustad Zahur Khan, a noted Dhrupad singer from Gohad, Bhind. Under his tutelage, she trained rigorously for fifteen years and eventually became the main court singer for the Orchha State and remained so till age 35.

That is when, she married Chiman Lal Gupta, a textile mill manager in Agra, and had five sons and three daughters. However after the death of her husband in 1958, she was abandoned by her in-laws, and returned to Tikamgarh. Here, she started selling pickles to make ends meet but continued her riyaz on the side. Eventually, at age 63, she gave her first public performance at the Allauddin Khan Sangeet Samaroh in Gwalior in 1981. Soon, she made a name for herself with "her phenomenal command over tala, her breath-control and exquisite delineation of ragas" and an uncanny similarity of her voice to Begum Akhtar.

In her last years, she fell into dire straits and even offered to return her awards. Subsequently, then Madhya Pradesh Chief Minister Babulal Gaur sanctioned Rs 1 lakh for her. She made news shortly before her death when she alleged that her eldest son Babu forged her signature and withdrew over Rs 1 lakh from her pension account and also tried to sell her awards. She died on 9 August 2006 in Tikamgarh, following a prolonged illness and was survived by four sons and three daughters. The following day, she was laid to rest in Tikamgarh, with full state honours.

== Awards ==
She received Tansen Samman of the Madhya Pradesh government in 1985, the Sikhar Samman in 1986, and Sangeet Natak Akademi Award in 1986, given by the Sangeet Natak Akademi, India's National Academy of Music, Dance & Drama, and receiving the Padma Shri in 1990.

== In popular culture ==
Ashgari Bai (1998), an Indian documentary film directed by Priti Chandriani and Brahmanand S. Singh, explores her life as an exponent of Dhrupad.
