= Tikamgarh =

City in Madhya Pradesh, India

- City
- Tikamgarh
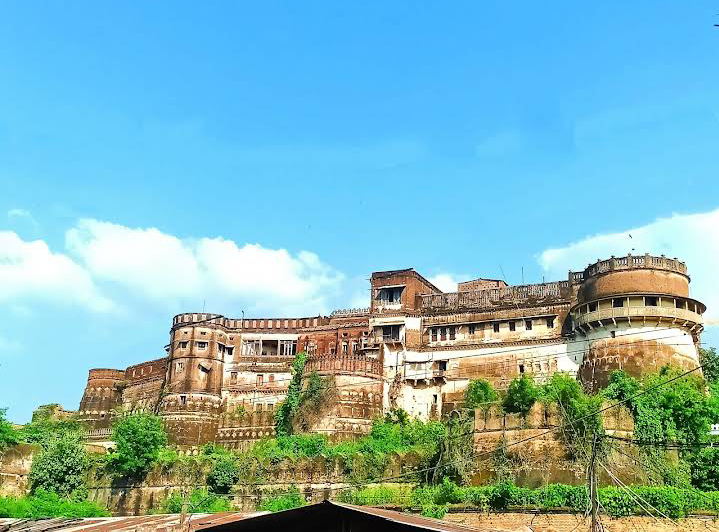
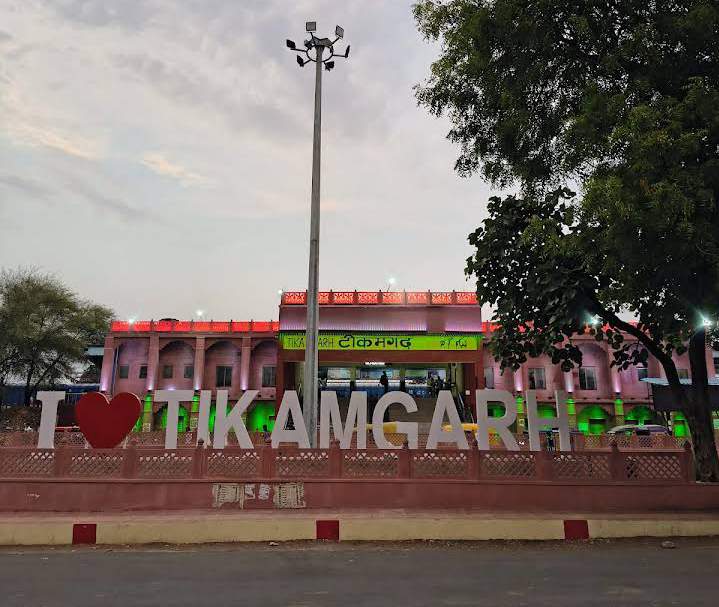
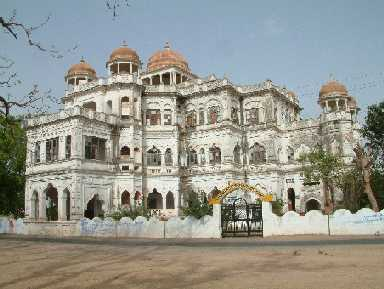
- Tikamgarh Fort Railway Station Tal Kothi Tikamgarh

- Location in Madhya Pradesh, India Tikamgarh (India) Tikamgarh (Asia)
- Coordinates: 24°44′50″N 78°51′00″E
- Country: India
- State: Madhya Pradesh
- Region: Bundelkhand
- Division: Sagar
- District: Tikamgarh
- Established: 1783 AD
- Named for: Krishna as Tikam

Government
  - Body: Municipality

Area
  - Total: 21 km^{2} (8.1 sq mi)
- Elevation: 349.170 m (1,145.57 ft)

Population (2011)
  - Total: 79,106
  - Density: 3,800/km^{2} (9,800/sq mi)
- Demonym: Bundelkhandi

Language
  - Official: Hindi
- Time zone: UTC+5:30 (IST)
- PIN: 472001 (HPO)
- Telephone code: 07683
- Vehicle registration: MP-36
- Sex ratio: 911
- Literacy: 74.9%
- Distance from New Delhi: 500 kilometres (310 mi) N (land)
- Website: tikamgarh.nic.in

Tikamgarh (also spelled Tikamgadh) is a town and tehsil in Tikamgarh district in the Indian state of Madhya Pradesh. The city serves as a district headquarters. The earlier name of Tikamgarh was Tehri (i.e., a triangle) consisting of three hamlets, forming a rough triangle, which is why there is still a locality in Tikamgarh known as 'Purani Tehri' (Old Tehri). Until Indian independence in 1947, Tikamgarh was part of the kingdom of Orchha, which was founded in the 16th century by the Bundeli chief Rudra Pratap Singh, who became the first King of Orchha. In 1783 the capital of the state was moved to Tehri, about 40 miles (64 km) south of Orchha, which was home to the fort of Tikamgarh, and the town eventually took the name of the fort. The district is famous for the old fort of Kundar known as Garh Kundar, which was built by Khangars and remained the capital of Khangar rulers from 1180 to 1347.

== Etymology ==
The original name of the town was Tehri. In 1780, the ruler of Orchha Vikramajit (1776–1817) shifted his capital from Orchha to Tehri and renamed it Tikamgarh (Tikam being a name of Krishna).

== History ==
Orchha was founded in the 1501 AD, by the Bundela chief, Rudra Pratap Singh, who became the first King of Orchha, (r. 1501-1531) and also built the Fort of Orchha. He died in an attempt to save a cow from a lion. The Chaturbhuj Temple was built, during the time of Akbar, by the Queen of Orchha, while Raj Mandir was built by 'Madhukar Shah ju Dev' during his reign, 1554 to 1591.

During the rule of Mughal Emperor, Jahangir, his ally, Vir Singh Deo (r. 1605-1627) reigned here, and it was during this period that Orchha reached its height, and many extant palaces are a reminder of its architectural glory, including Jahangir Mahal (b. ca 1605) and Sawan Bhadon.

During the reign of Jehangir, in 1618, Raja Veer Singh Deva Bundela of Orchha had built Keshavdeva temple at the cost of thirty-three lakhs in Mathura. A French traveller Tavernier visited Mathura in 1650 and had described the octagonal temple built in red sandstone. Italian traveller Niccolao Manucci who worked in Mughal court has also described the temple. Mughal prince Dara Shikoh had patronised the temple and donated a railing to the temple. The railing was removed by Mathura governor Abdun Nabi Khan on the order of Mughal emperor Aurangzeb and he built Jama mosque on the ruins of the Hindu temples. During the Jat rebellion in Mathura, Abdul Nabi Khan was killed in 1669. Aurangzeb attacked Mathura and destroyed that Keshavdeva temple in 1670 and built Shahi Eidgah in its place.

In the early 17th century, Jhujhar Singh rebelled the Mughal emperor Shah Jahan, whose armies devastated the state and occupied Orchha from 1635 to 1641. Orchha and Datia were the only Bundela states not subjugated by the Marathas in the 18th century. The town of Tehri, now Tikamgarh, about 52 miles (84 km) south of Orchha, became the capital of Orchha state in 1783, and is now the district town; Tehri was the site of the fort of Tikamgarh, and the town eventually took the name of the fort.

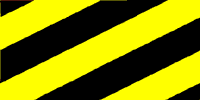
Flag of princely state of Orchha, Tikamgarh

Hamir Singh, who ruled from 1848 to 1874, was elevated to the style of Maharaja in 1865. Maharaja Pratap Singh ju Dev (born 1854, died 1930), who succeeded to the throne in 1874, devoted himself entirely to the development of his state, himself designing most of the engineering and irrigation works that were executed during his reign. In 1901, the state had an area of 2,000 sq mi (5,200 km^{2}), and population of 52,634. It was the oldest and highest in rank of all the Bundela states, with a 17-gun salute, and its Maharajas bore the hereditary title of First of the Prince of Bundelkhand. Vir Singh, Pratap Singh's successor, merged his state with India on 1 January 1950. The district became part of Vindhya Pradesh state, which was merged into Madhya Pradesh state in 1956.

Today Orchha is almost a nondescript town with a small population, and its importance is maintained only due to its rich architectural heritage and tourism. However the name of the Orchha State continued to be in use, as can be seen in the inscriptions of Jain tirth Paporaji, now on the outskirts of Tikamgarh.

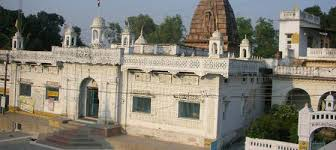
Aharji Jain Teerth

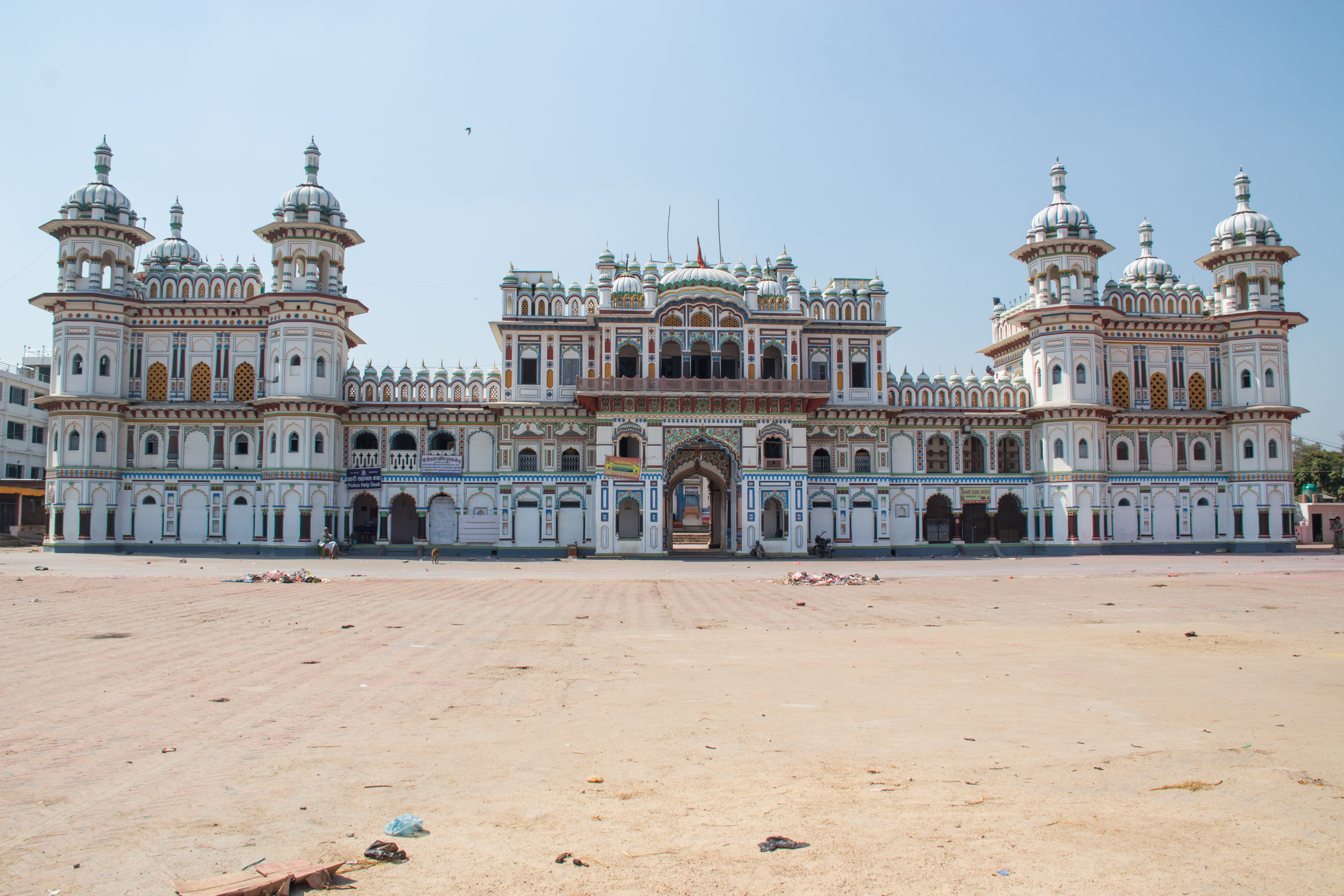
Janaki temple

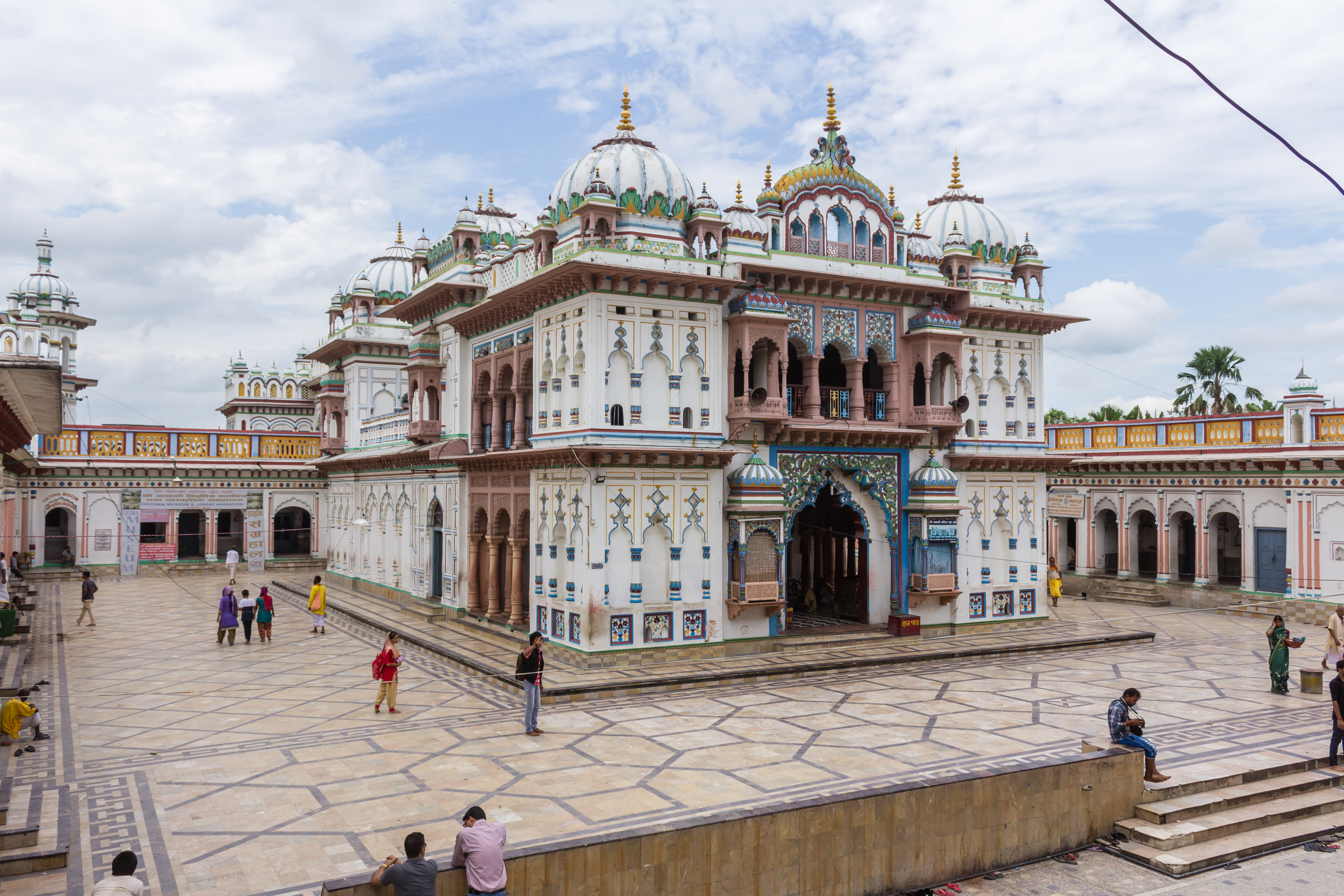
interior view of Janaki temple

== Climate ==
Climate data for Tikamgarh (1991–2020, extremes 1968–present)
Month	Jan	Feb	Mar	Apr	May	Jun	Jul	Aug	Sep	Oct	Nov	Dec	Year
Record high °C (°F)	36.2 (97.2)	37.5 (99.5)	42.0 (107.6)	47.1 (116.8)	47.5 (117.5)	46.6 (115.9)	45.0 (113.0)	41.0 (105.8)	39.0 (102.2)	38.3 (100.9)	36.1 (97.0)	33.3 (91.9)	47.5 (117.5)
Mean daily maximum °C (°F)	24.6 (76.3)	27.9 (82.2)	33.9 (93.0)	38.3 (100.9)	41.9 (107.4)	39.1 (102.4)	33.2 (91.8)	31.8 (89.2)	32.6 (90.7)	33.1 (91.6)	30.1 (86.2)	26.4 (79.5)	32.9 (91.2)
Mean daily minimum °C (°F)	7.3 (45.1)	11.3 (52.3)	16.9 (62.4)	21.6 (70.9)	25.3 (77.5)	25.6 (78.1)	23.5 (74.3)	23.2 (73.8)	22.7 (72.9)	18.5 (65.3)	13.2 (55.8)	9.2 (48.6)	18.2 (64.8)
Record low °C (°F)	0.2 (32.4)	0.5 (32.9)	5.0 (41.0)	7.6 (45.7)	11.6 (52.9)	16.0 (60.8)	16.0 (60.8)	16.0 (60.8)	8.0 (46.4)	10.0 (50.0)	3.2 (37.8)	0.0 (32.0)	0.0 (32.0)
Average rainfall mm (inches)	4.0 (0.16)	11.6 (0.46)	2.9 (0.11)	0.3 (0.01)	3.3 (0.13)	98.6 (3.88)	301.7 (11.88)	168.9 (6.65)	118.5 (4.67)	10.0 (0.39)	4.6 (0.18)	1.9 (0.07)	726.3 (28.59)
Average rainy days	0.1	0.9	0.9	0.1	0.7	4.4	12.5	8.8	5.9	0.6	0.1	0.2	35.2
Average relative humidity (%) (at 17:30 IST)	58	54	46	35	30	48	71	74	70	62	60	57	55
Source: India Meteorological Department

== Demographics ==
As per 2011 Indian Census, Tikamgarh has a population of 79,106, of which 41,399 are males and 37,707 are females. Population in the age range of 0 to 6 years is 9,376. It has an average literacy rate of 74.9%, with male literacy of 79.2% and 70.3% female literacy. The effective literacy rate of 7+ population of Tikamgarh was 85.0%, of which male literacy rate was 90.0% and female literacy rate was 79.6%. The Scheduled Castes and Scheduled Tribes population was 11,779 and 1,424 respectively. Tikamgarh had 14587 household in 2011.

== Administration ==
Tikamgarh is a Municipality city in district, Tikamgarh city is divided into 27 wards for which elections are held every 5 year. Tikamgarh Municipality has total administration over 14,587 houses to which it supplies basic amenities like water and sewerage.

== Industry ==
Tikamgarh has emerged as a major center for brass statues. While the metalcrafting tradition in small towns has decline with the emergence of major trade centers. the tradition of casting bronze statues was established by Bhainalal Soni in 1950s, who traditionally made silver ornaments in the local style. The President of Indian has awarded Harish Soni and Dhaniran Soni for their craftsmanship.

== Transportation ==
=== Roads ===
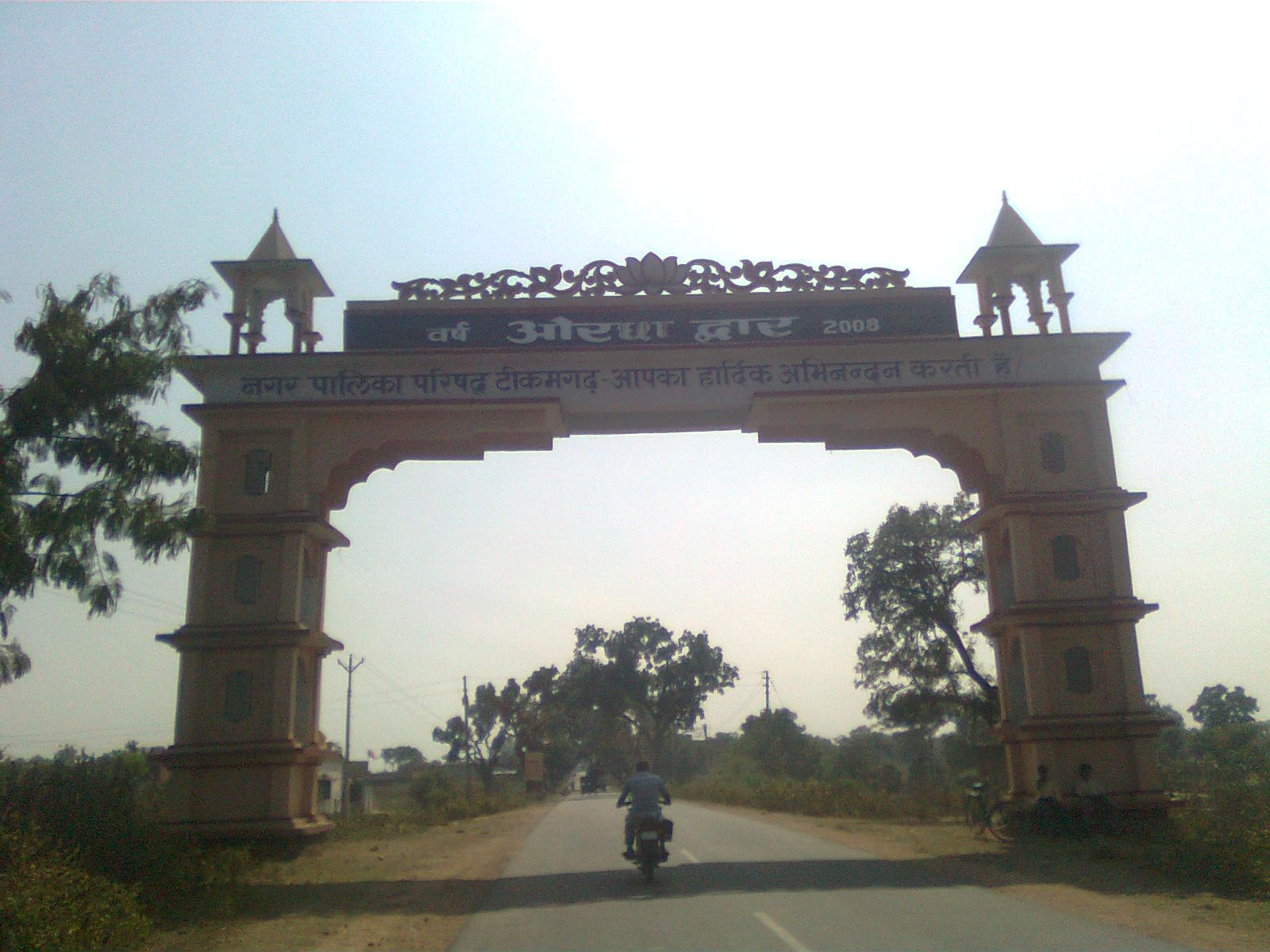
Welcome gate at Jhansi Road in Tikamgarh

There are daily bus services to every part of the state. Highways passing through Tikamgarh include NH-12A, SH-37, and SH-10. Dr. Syama Prasad Mookerjee Bus Stand has daily services to New Delhi, Lalitpur, Nagpur, Kanpur, Indore, Bhopal, Jhansi, Gwalior, Jabalpur, and Sagar.

=== Railways ===
The construction of railway line to Tikamgarh has been completed in 2012. On 26 April 2013 was connected with railway services. The rail services begun from Lalitpur (Uttar Pradesh) to Tikamgarh and was started under the Lalitpur-Singrauli Rail Project. The first train to travel between the two stations was Tikamgarh-Jhansi (Uttar Pradesh) passenger train. The train was sanctioned between the two stations in the Rail Budget of 2012–13. The railway line between Tikamgarh and Lalitpur rail route is 52 kilometre long. Union Minister Pradeep Jain flagged off the train at Lalitpur station.

=== Airways ===
Khajuraho is the nearest (125 km) airport from where daily flights operate for Delhi and Agra.

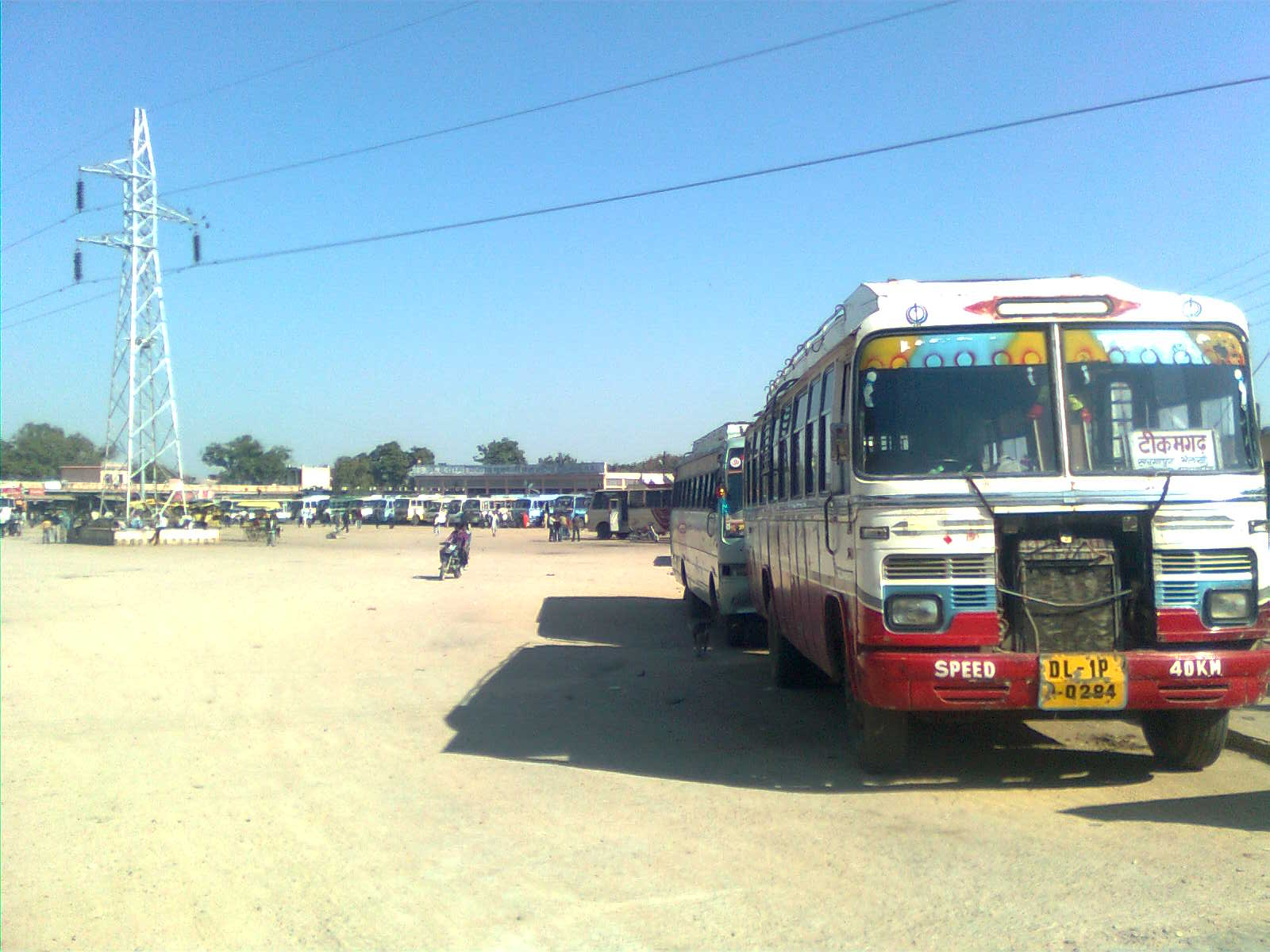
Half view Of Bus Stand (Tikamgarh)

Tikamgarh Railway Station

== Places of interest ==
Places of interest within 10 km include:

- Kundeshwar, Famous temple of God Shiva

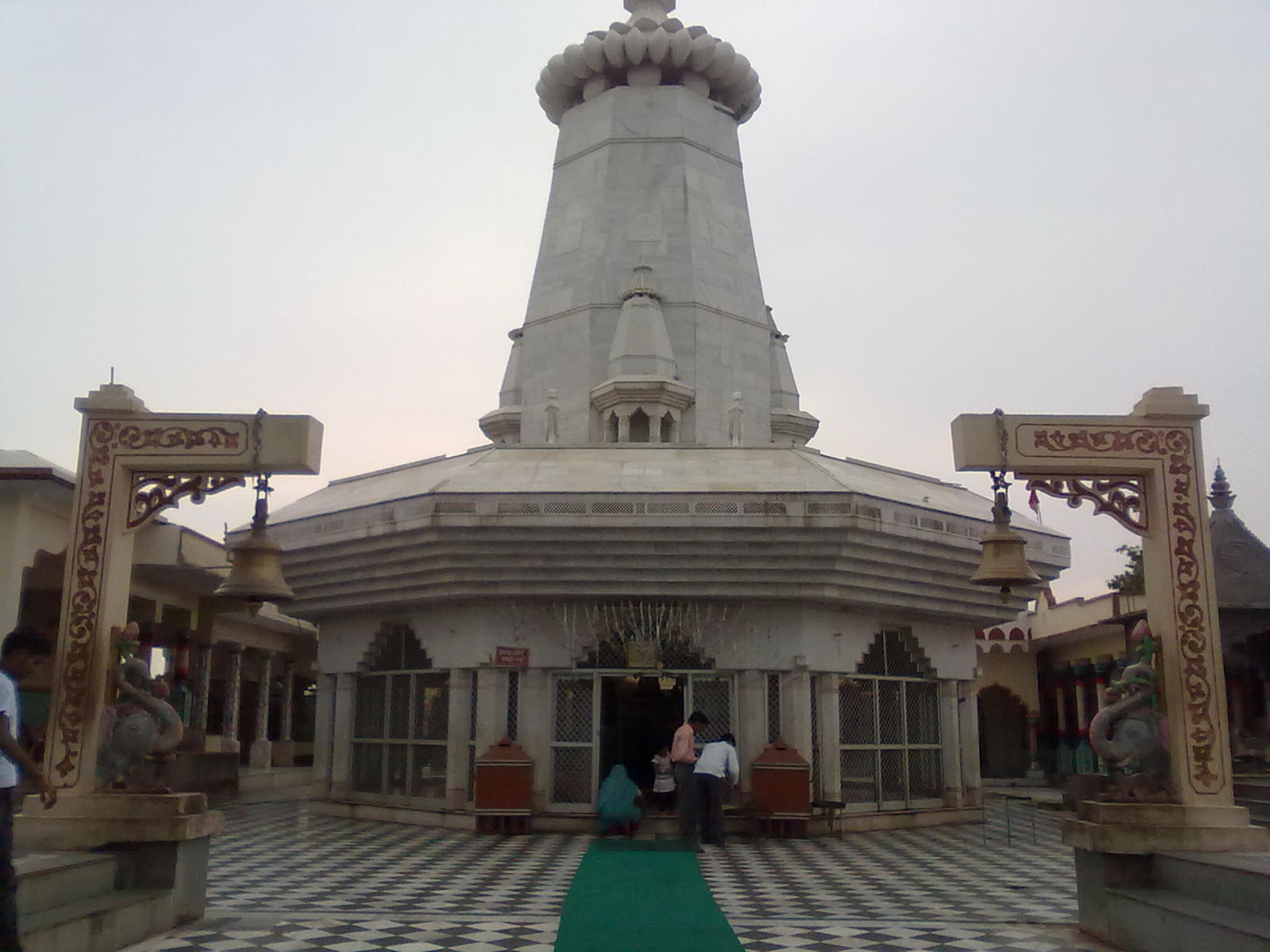
Kundeshwar Temple Tikamgarh

River view at Kundeshwar, Tikamgarh

- Paporaji, Famous Temple of Jain Culture, here's many temple dedicated to lord Mahavira
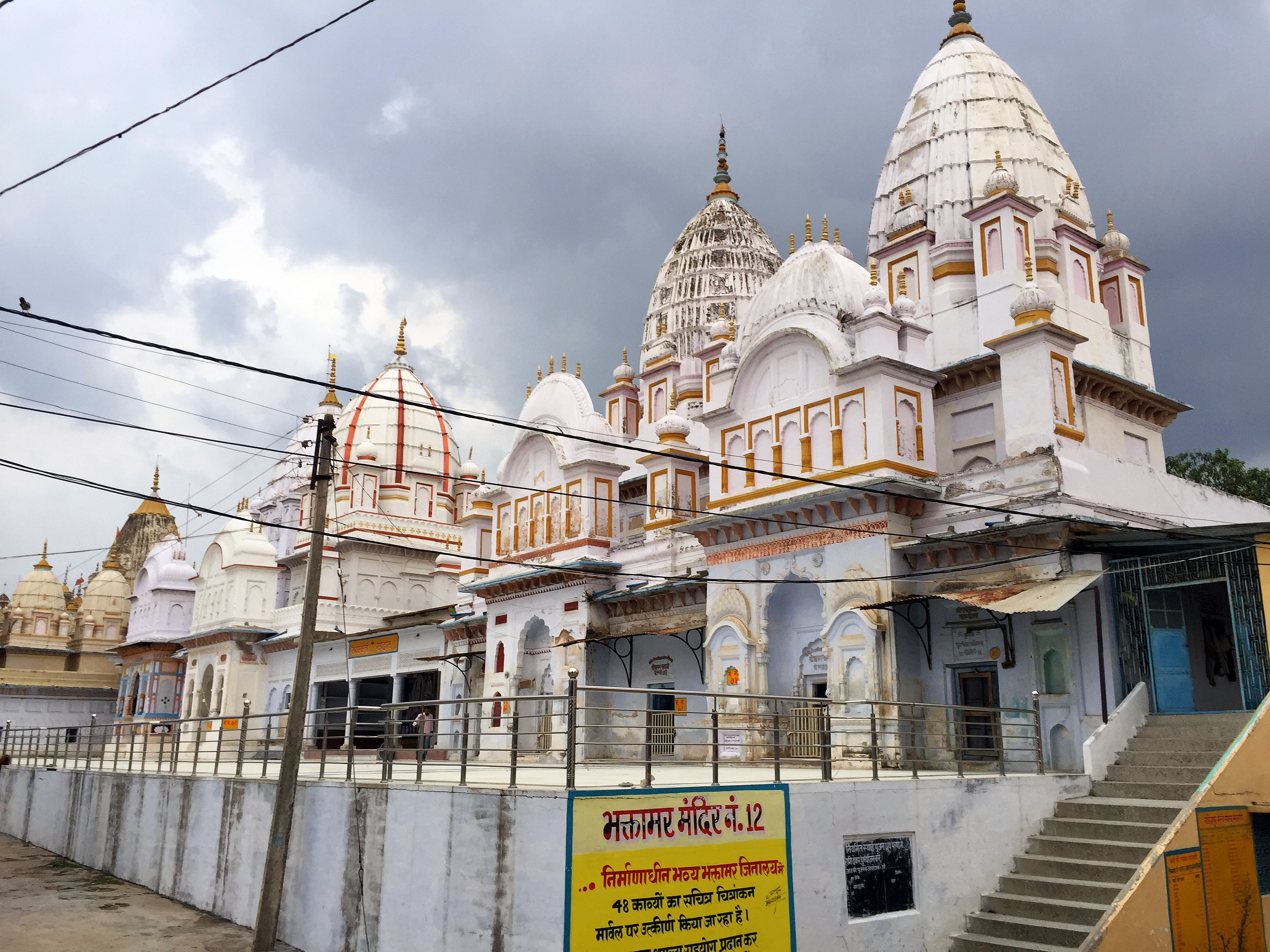
Digambar Jain Atishay kshetra Paporaji at sagar road near tikamgarh

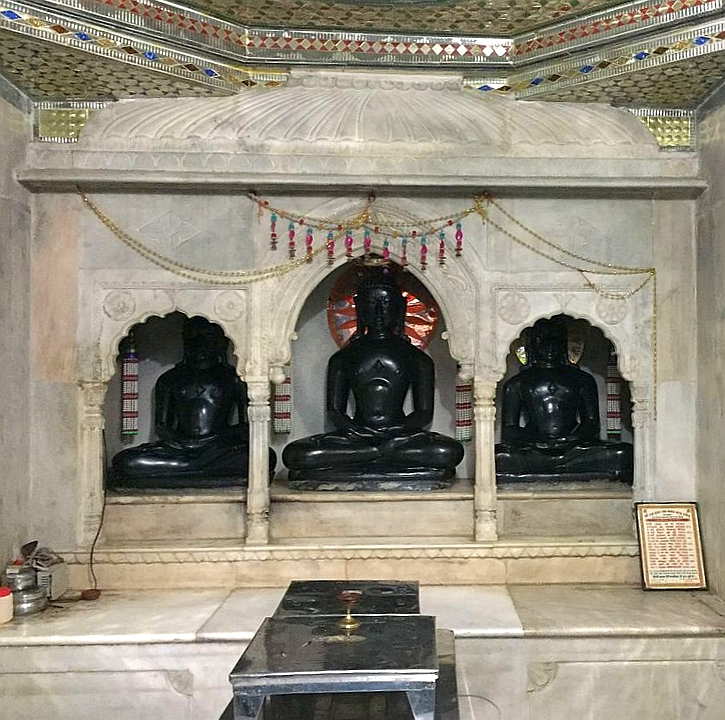
Chandella period idols of Lord Adinath belonging to 1145 AD in the underground chamber at Paporaji

=== Other major attractions in Tikamgarh ===
- Tikamgarh Fort
- Rajmahal Tikamgarh
- Talkothi Tikamgarh
- Mahendra Sagar Lake

== Education ==
Tikamgarh's schools include:

- Saroj Convent Higher Secondary School
- Pushpa Higher Secondary School

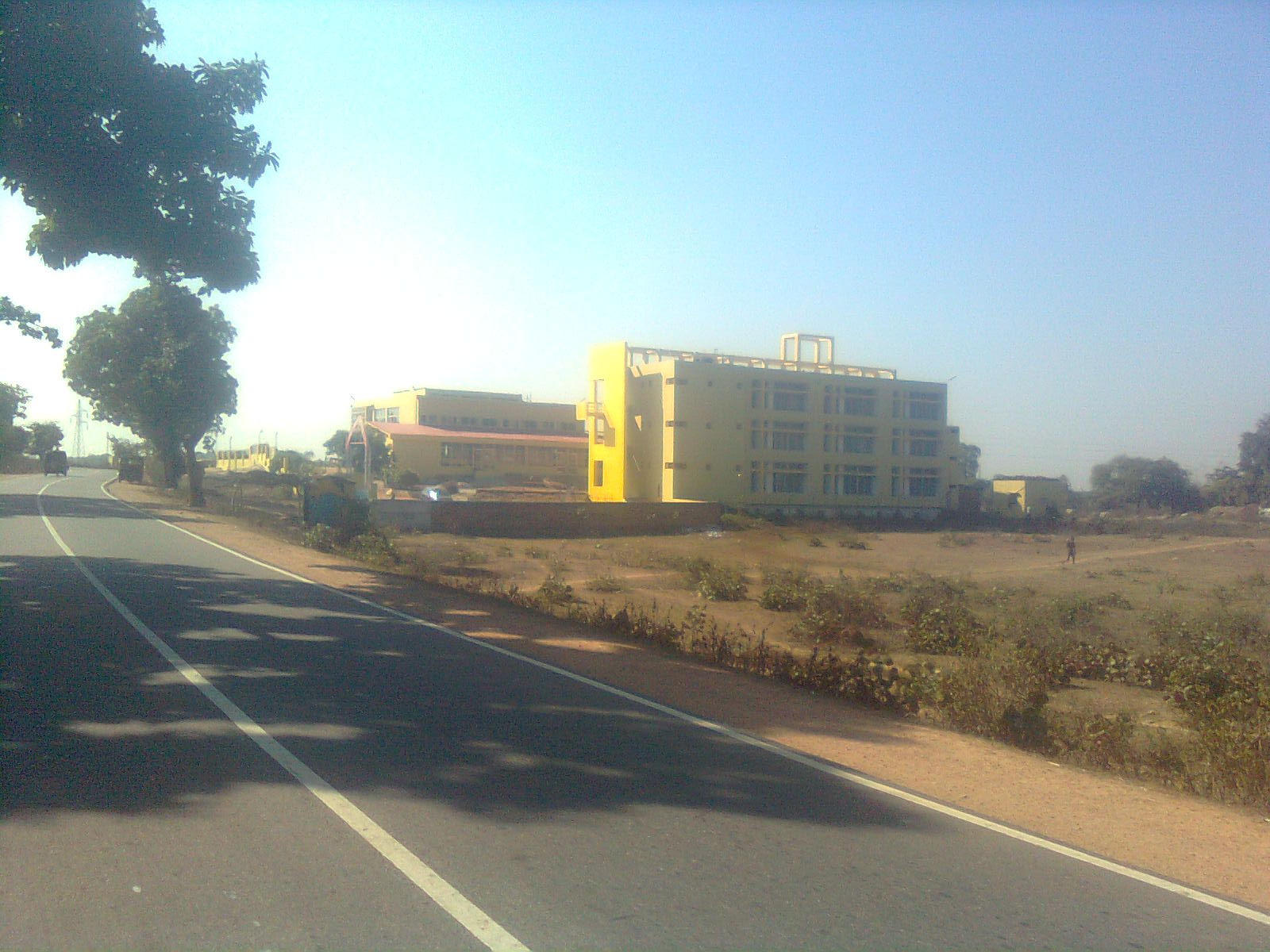
A school in Tikamgarh at NH-12A

== Radio and television station ==
Tikamgarh has a radio station of All India Radio (आकाशवाणी) under Prasar Bharati at '675 kHz from Chhatarpur & 92.7 Big FM from Jhansi. Tikamgarh has its own Doordarshan Kendra established in 2008.

== Notable people ==
- Asgari Bai
- Uma Bharati
- Keshavdas
- Mrinal Pande
- Rajendra Nath, Bollywood actor
- Virendra Kumar Khatik, Cabinet Minister, Government of India for the Ministry of Social Justice and Empowerment

== See also ==
- Orchha
- Kundeshwar
- Bundelkhand
- Prithvipur
- Khajuraho
- Badagaon
