= Khatik Mohalla (Mathura Cantt) =

North-Indian city

- Village
- Country: India
- State: Uttar Pradesh
- District: Mathura

Government
  - Type: Panchayat raj
  - Body: Gram panchayat
- Elevation: 640 m (2,100 ft)

Population (2011)
  - Total: 1,124
- Sex ratio 517/512 ♂/♀

Languages
  - Official: Hindi
- Time zone: UTC+5:30 (IST)
- PIN: 281001

Khatik Mohalla is a city located in Mathura Cantt, Uttar Pradesh. It is just 2 kilometers from Mathura bus stop. Agra is 61 kilometers to the south east.
