= Atul Khatik =

Indian politician

Atul Khatik is an Indian politician belonging to Bahujan Samaj Party. He was elected from Hastinapur assembly constituency in the 1996 Uttar Pradesh Legislative Assembly elections.
