= Khatik Mohalla (Jabalpur) =

- Village
- Location in Madhya Pradesh, India Khatik Mohalla (Jabalpur) (India)
- Coordinates: 23.195690°N 76.529880°E
- Country: India
- State: Madhya Pradesh
- District: Jabalpur

Government
  - Type: Panchayat raj
  - Body: Gram panchayat
- Elevation: 310 m (1,020 ft)

Population (2011)
  - Total: 5,000
- Sex ratio 517/512 ♂/♀

Languages
  - Official: Hindi
- Time zone: UTC+5:30 (IST)

Khatik Mohalla is a village in Jabalpur district of Madhya Pradesh, India. It is located 2 kilometres from Jabalpur Railway Station, 6.3 kilometres from Meerut and 4.6 kilometres from Army Hospital, Meerut Cantt. The village is administrated by a sarpanch who is an elected representative of village as per Panchayati raj (India).

== Transport ==
Jabalpur railway junction is the nearest train station. The village is 15 kilometres away from Jabalpur airport and the nearest international airport is Raja Bhoj International airport located in Bhopal which is 339 kilometres from Khatik Mohalla.
