= Khatik Mohalla Street =

Road in Shahpura, India

- Khatik Mohalla Road
- Length: 338.45 m (1,110.4 ft)
- Width: 3.5
- Addresses: Khatik Mohalla, Shahpura, Bhilwara, India
- Postal code: 311404

Khatik Mohalla Street is a road located at Khatik Mohalla, Shahpura city in Rajasthan, India. It is located 338.45 meters from Ramdwara Road to Kothar Mohalla, Shahpura. It divide Khatik Mohalla, Shahpura in two parts.

Kharwa is the nearest train station. The village is 75.6 kilometres away from Ondwa airport in Rajasthan and the nearest international airport is Indira Gandhi International Airport located in Delhi which is 466 kilometres.
