= Badagaon =

Badagaon Badagaon Dhasan
- Town
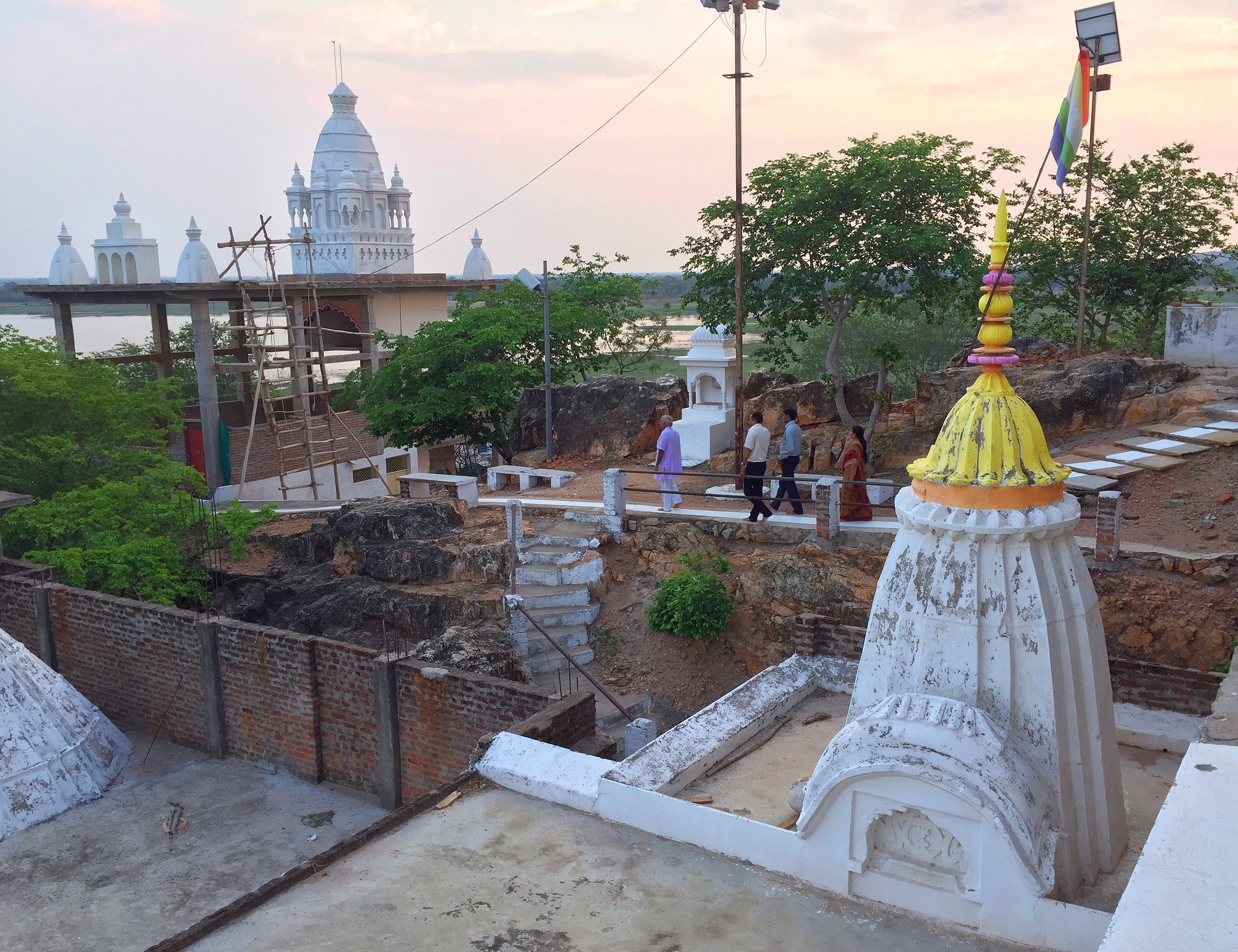
- Tempel in badagaon

- Location in Madhya Pradesh, India
- Coordinates: 24°34′6″N 79°1′5″E
- Country: India
- State: Madhya Pradesh
- District: Tikamgarh

Government
  - Chairperson: Bharti Neeraj Prajapati

Population (2015)
  - Total: 20,000

Languages
  - Official: Bundelkhandi, Hindi
- Time zone: UTC+5:30 (IST)
- PIN: 472010
- Telephone code: +91-07683
- Vehicle registration: MP-36
- Sex ratio: 0.925 ♂/♀
- Literacy: 84%

Badagaon Dhasan is a town and a Nagar Parishad (City Council) in Tikamgarh district in the state of Madhya Pradesh, India.

== Demographics ==
As of 2011 India census, Badagaon had a population of 18,584. Males constitute 52% of the population and females 48%. Badagaon has a literacy rate of 84%, much higher than the national average of 65%, with 89% of the males and 71% of females literate. 60% of the population is under 25 years of age.

== Education ==
Most primary and secondary schools in Badagaon are affiliated with the state level M.P. Board. Among the main schools are:

- Amar Shaheed Narayan Das Khare Government Higher Secondary School
- Government Girls High School
- Government Primary School
- Mata Beti Bai Higher secondary School
- Vardhaman val vidhya niketan higher secondary school
- Kids Care Convent School
- Manshapurna public high school

== Geography ==
Badagaon is located at 24°34′6″N 79°1′5″E.It has an average elevation of 319 metres (1,047 feet). The headquarters town of the Badagaon is in tikamgarh tehsil. It is situated on the Tikamgarh-Sagar road at distance of 25 km. from Tikamgarh and 100 km from Sagar. Badagaon is located in the eastern region of Madhya Pradesh, on the northern edge of the Bundhelkhand plateau, on the Dhasan River.

== Climate ==
Badagaon has a transitional climate between a tropical wet and dry climate and a humid subtropical climate. Three distinct seasons are observed: summer, monsoon and winter. Summers start in mid-March and can be extremely hot in April and May. The highest temperature recorded was 48 °C in 1994. Average Summer temperatures may go as high as 42–44.c (100.4 °F) but humidity is very low. Due to Badagaon's location on the eastern edge of the Buldhelkhand Plateau, a cool breeze appears in the evenings. The monsoon season starts in late June, with temperatures averaging around 26 °C (79 °F), with sustained, torrential rainfall and high humidity. The average rainfall is 32 inches. Winters start in mid-November and are dry, mild and sunny. Temperatures average about 4–15 °C (39–59 °F), but can fall close to freezing on some nights. In summer temperatures can be sometimes as high as 48–50 °C (118–122 °F) and in winters it can be as low as 2 °C (36 °F).

== Transport ==
The major bus terminal is main bus stand. Badagaon is well connected to other parts of the state through state highway. Bus service and private vehicles are easily available from and to Jhansi, Sagar, Bhopal, Gwalior, Indore, Jabalpur, Lalitpur and Tikamgarh. The nearest railway stations are Sagar, Jhansi, Lalitpur and Tikamgarh. The nearest railway station is 28 km away in district Tikamgarh. Sagar in M.P. and Jhansi in U.P. are also the railway station at a distance of about 100 km each. Bus service and private vehicles are easily available from Jhansi, Sagar and Tikamgarh. This Tirth Kshetra is located on the main route of Tikamgarh - Sagar and Tikamgarh - Jabalpur.

== Main festivals ==
All national festivals like Holi, Hanumaan Jayanti, Baisakhi, Raksha Bandhan, Navratri, Dussehra, makar sankranti, Ganeshotsav, Diwali, Ramzan, Eid are celebrated. Apart from all these festivals the Jain Community also celebrate the 10 days Paryushan Parv.

== Places of interest ==
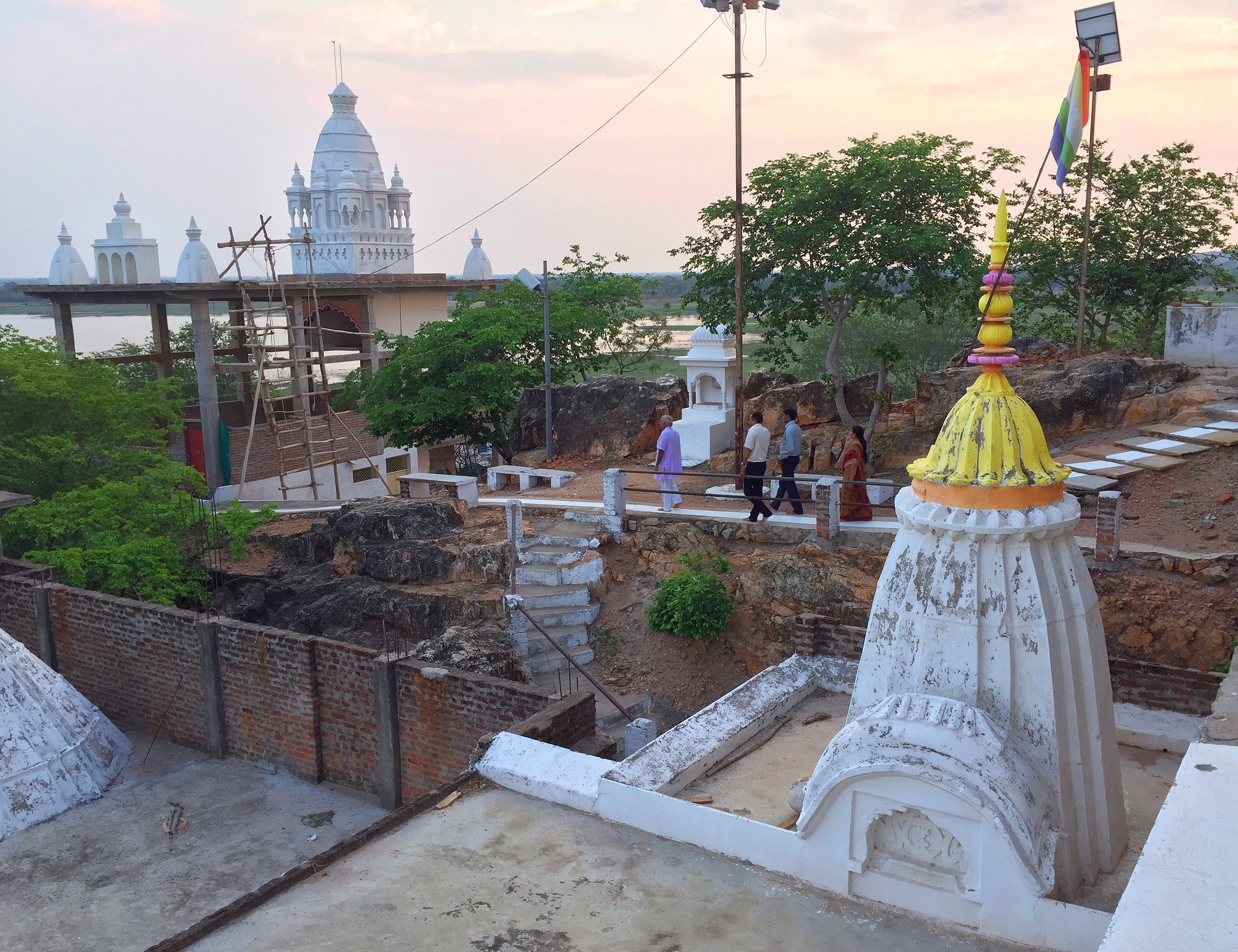
Bada gaon temple

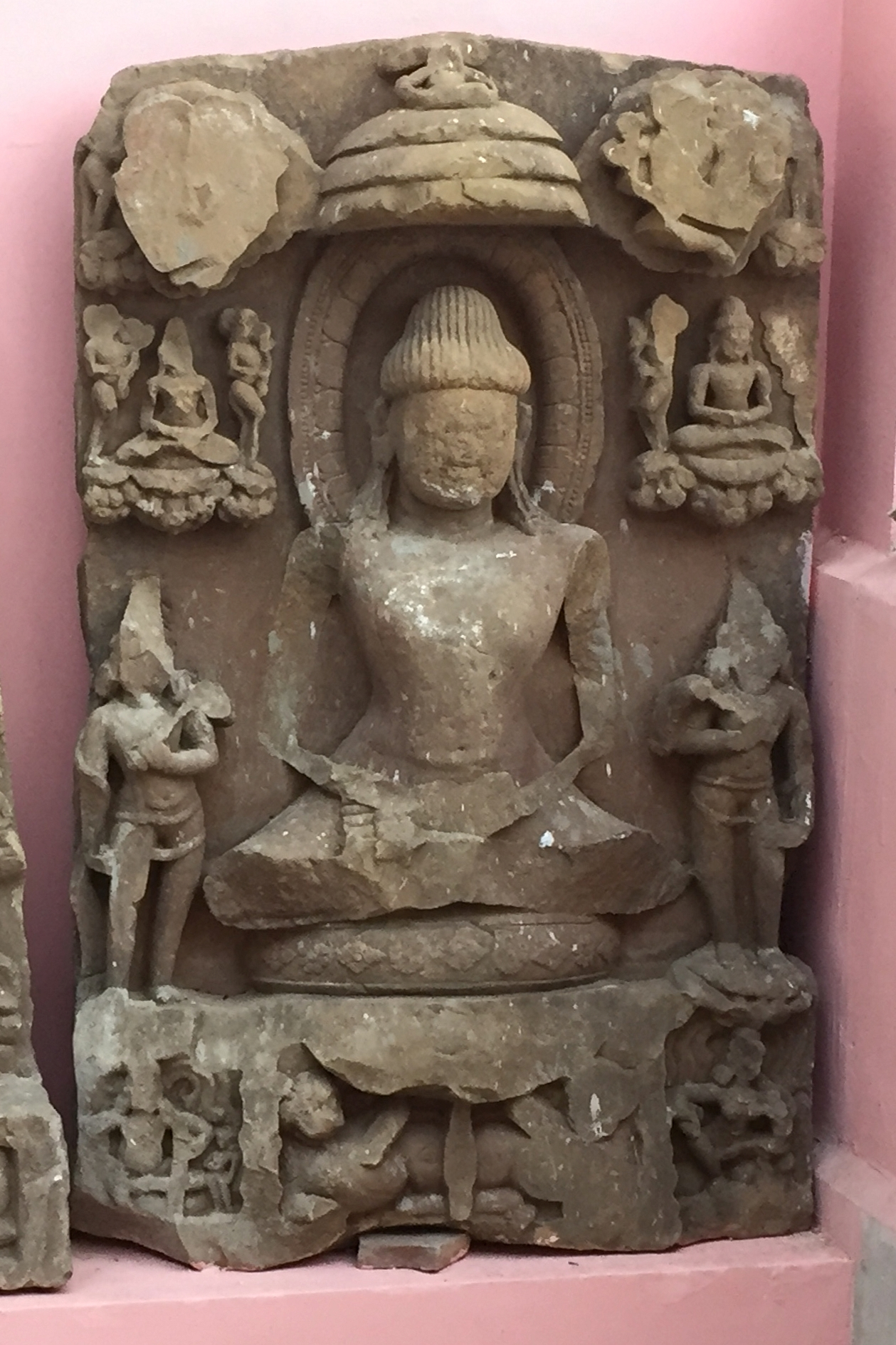
Ancient idol in Bada gaon temple

Mulnayak
Nearly 50 cm high, brown-colored idol of Bhagawan Adinath Chaubisi on one stone in the Kayotsarga posture.

Tirth
It is on the series of Koti Parvat hill in the Falhodi Badagaon near Dhasan River, so also known as Falhodi Badagaon (Dhasan)

Historicity
These ancient temples of Chandelas era were came into picture recently and were renovated as necessary. This is the place of Nirvana of 3 and half Carore Muni (Jain Saints) as Marathi writer Bhattarak Gunkerti write in Tirth Vandana "Falhodi Badagaon Ahoot Koti Siddhasi Namaskar Mangha". Here is a mysterious non-violence tank behind the hill, which is called Jainera Talab. Here is a Shiv temple of the age of Chandelas (Similar to the temples in Khajuraho).

Other Temples
There are three temples on the hill with five Vedis. There is a very old Siddh Gufa (Cave) and a Manistam just behind the temples.

- Hanuman Temple - This temple houses Hanuman, in the north region of the town.
- Dhanusdhari Temple - Sita Ram Temple situated in the heart of town.

*Galary*

Badagaon

== See also ==
- Navagarh
- Nab Durga mandir
- Badi Mata Mandir (talab)
- Ram Raja mandir
- Kali Mata mandir (bus stand old)
- Hanuman mandir
