= Khatik Mohalla (Meerut) =

- Town
- Location in Uttar Pradesh, India Khatik Mohalla (India)
- Coordinates: 29.018161°N 77.738728°E
- Country: India
- State: Uttar Pradesh
- District: Meerut

Government
  - Type: Panchayat raj
  - Body: Gram panchayat
- Elevation: 240 m (790 ft)

Population (2011)
  - Total: 1,029
- Sex ratio 517/512 ♂/♀

Languages
  - Official: Hindi
- Time zone: UTC+5:30 (IST)

Khatik Mohalla is a town in Meerut district of Uttar Pradesh, India. It is located 6.2 kilometres from Meerut bus stand, 6.3 kilometres from Meerut,7.3 kilometres from Meerut cantt railway station and 4.6 kilometres from Army Hospital, Meerut Cantt. The village is administrated by a sarpanch who is an elected representative of village as per Panchayati raj (India).

== Transport ==
Meerut city railway junction is the nearest train station. The town is 19 kilometres away from Dr. Bhimrao Ambedkar airport in Meerut and the nearest international airport is Indira Gandhi International airport located in Delhi which is 98 kilometres.
