= Khatik =

Schedule caste of India

- Religions: Hinduism, minority Islam
- Languages: Hindi; Punjabi; Rajasthani; Telugu; Marathi; Bhojpuri; Kannada; Bengali; Gujarati
- Country: India; Nepal; Pakistan; Bangladesh
- Populated states: Uttar Pradesh, Rajasthan, Karnataka, Madhya Pradesh, Telangana, Haryana, Andhra Pradesh, Punjab, Maharashtra, Delhi, Jharkhand, West Bengal, Gujarat.

The Khatik is a caste found in the Indian subcontinent, mainly modern-day India, Pakistan and Nepal.

== History ==
Khatik community has historically been a community of butchers, though they have occupied other occupations like tanners, fruit sellers and day labour and are found among Hindus and Muslims. Similar to other Dalit communities, they were compelled to stay outside the settlements of caste Hindus in Dalit Bastis, with lesser amenities. During the 19th century, many other groups often worked as migrant labourers on British government projects around the United Provinces. Although most were still economically backward, some managed to find a niche in selling bristles to brush-makers in Europe and British colonies. In the late Colonial period of Kanpur, there were several Khatik-owned firms in this business, referring it as Khatik Mohalla. Other business related to the butchery and tanning of animals continued in homes and businesses, often run by women. These bastis were looked down upon by high society,leading to passage of colonial laws 1929 which shut down home factories of leather and other products which were associated with the spread of disease. Attempts were also made by upper castes to 'clean' these bastis with soap and other materials.

For instance in Varanasi in 1931, police launched an operation against fruit and vegetable sellers and other labourers in the khatik basti. Several Khatik Congress leaders like Shivmangal Ram Vaidh and Shivlal organised strikes and protests among Khatik fruit and vegetable vendors against exploitation by big traders and businessmen. Khatik labourers would mobilised them under the Adi-Hindu Sabha against begaar (forced labour) system which was prevalent at the time. In the 1950s, the Khatiks were not included in the Scheduled Caste list and launched a mass movement to be added. When the Kalelkar Commission visited the Dalit bastis in Kanpur, Allahabad and other places in UP, the Khatiks opened their tanneries and their houses so the commission could see how they smelled. Often the elite newspapers would label their bastis as suarbaade (pig pens) as Vartman did in 1943 in Kanpur.

Some Khatiks also got enough education and replaced the old caste Panchayats and built temples and gurudwaras for the community. For instance a thekedar Bihari Lal Mistri and his sons were influential in Kanpur. They built a gurudwara and place of worship for the Sant Shivnarayan sect which was popular among Dalits in Uttar Pradesh at the time. When this movement was assimilated into the Adi-Hindu movement, the place continued to serve as a meeting point and spiritual centre for the community. Unlike other Dalit communities, Khatiks did not to Sanskritize themselves, but changed their surnames to Sonkar.

While many Khatiks maintained a large distance from Hinduism, some Khatiks embraced reformist Hindu ideologies. The ideology of Hindutva in particular began to penetrate parts of Khatik society and led to their distancing from Muslims, due to their association with pigs, despite living close by each other. In 1992 during the riots in Kanpur, a Khatik named Kala Bachcha who had political influence andwas a councillor from BJP organised riots against Muslims. His son Rahul Bachha Sonkar is a BJP MLA from Bilhaur. Today the Khatik-Muslim mixed areas are still known as communal hotspots today. Hindu outfits are attempting to bring in Khatiks as 'Hindu butchers', as opposed to the Muslim butchers who produce Halal meat, to convince Hindus to boycott Halal, supported by several Khatik BJP leaders.

== People ==
- Jagannath Pahadia, former Chief Minister of Rajasthan
- Rahul Bachha Sonkar, Member of Uttar Pradesh Legislative Assembly
- Ragini Sonkar, Member of Parliament from Machhlishahr

== Religion ==
The etymology of the word Khatik comes from Sanskrit word khattka or kautik meaning butcher or hunter.

Most of the modern-day Khatiks are Hindus.

== Legal status ==
Khatiks are identified as Other Backward Class in Gujarat, Bihar, Jharkhand, Karnataka, Maharashtra, Andhra Pradesh and Telangana, and Scheduled Caste in Uttar Pradesh, Punjab, Himachal Pradesh, Haryana, Madhya Pradesh, West Bengal, Chhattisgarh, Rajasthan and Delhi.
