= Dinman Hardoul Singh =

Hindu deity

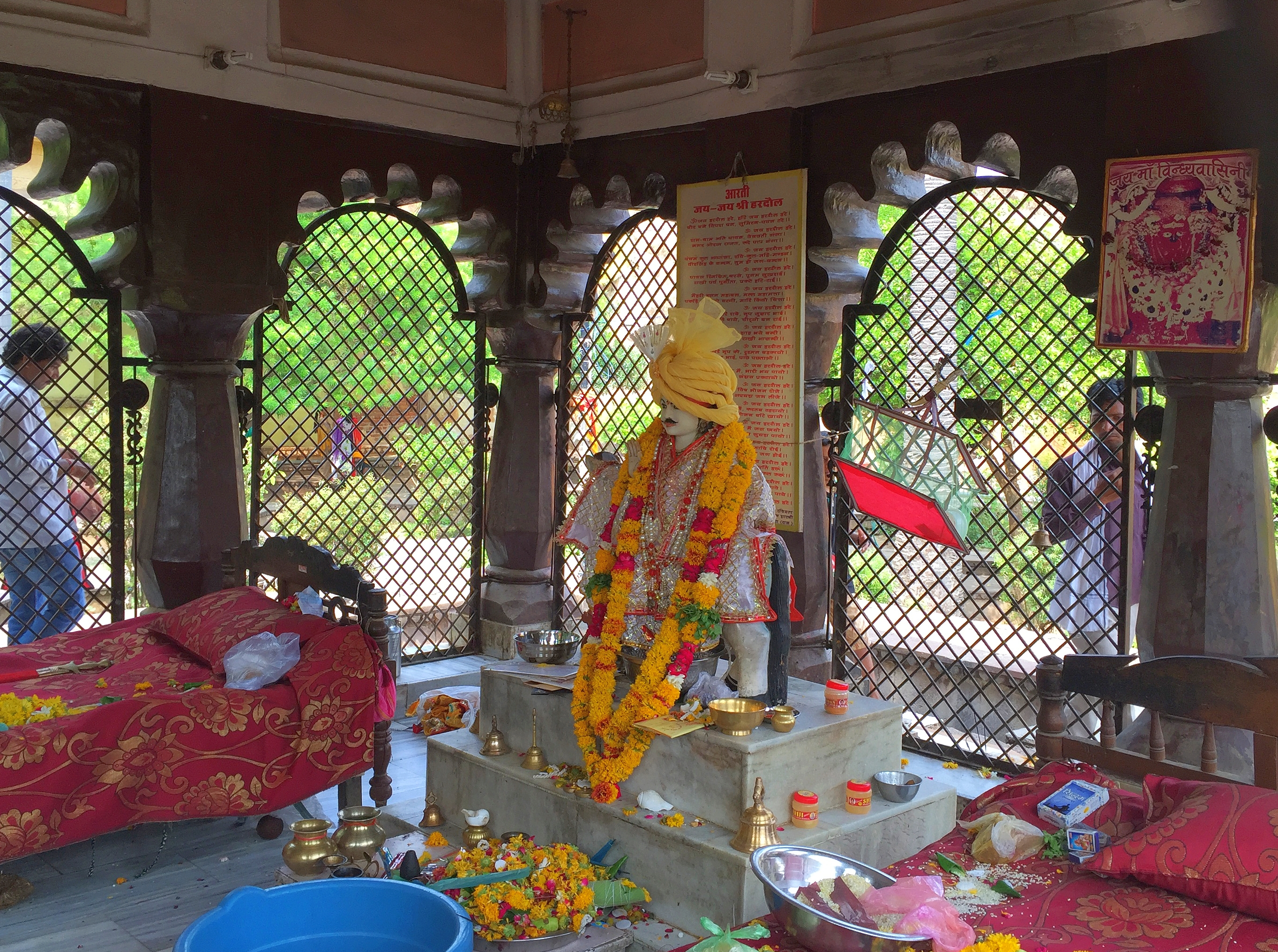
Hardaul ka Baithak memorial at Orchha

Dinman Hardoul Singh or Lala Hardoul is a Hindu folk deity of Bundelkhand in India. He was the prince of Orchha and the son of maharaja Vir Singh Deo and the brother of Jhujhar Singh. He was born in 1664 and died in 1688 at the age of 24. A temple of Hardoul in Bundelkhand is a centre for pilgrims and according to local beliefs he is still alive and is worshipped as a deity.

He is sometimes considered to be a nephew of Alha and Udal of Mahoba (see Alhakhand), however Alha and Udal were Banaphars during Chandela rule, where as Lala Hardoul was a Bundela.

== Folklore ==
Local legend states that Prince Hardoul's elder brother, Jhujhar Singh, ordered his wife to poison Hardoul after suspecting an extra-marital affair between them. When their sister later asked Jhujhar to help with her daughter's marriage, he sarcastically referred her to the dead Hardoul, who appeared at the wedding.

It is still believed by the local people that Hardoul attends weddings he is invited to and people leave him a wedding card to seek his blessings.

== In popular culture ==
The legend of Lala Hardoul is popular locally and is performed as street theatre in Bundelkhand. Chundri Odhasi Mahro Bir (also released as Lala Hardaul) is a 2012 Indian historical drama film, based on the folklore, directed by Nishant Bhardwaj and produced by Cair Saangri. It stars Sachendra Choubey as Hardaul, Divyanka Tripathi as Padmavati (the queen and wife of Jhujhar Singh) and Devendra Bhagat as the king Jhujhar Singh.

== See also ==
- Jahangir Mahal
- Chaturbhuj Temple
- Ram Raja Temple
- Pravin Rai Mahal
- Keshavdas
- Anarkali
- Rani of Jhansi
