= Orchha Fort complex =

Historical monument site in Orchha, Madhya Pradesh, India

- Orchha, Madhya Pradesh, India
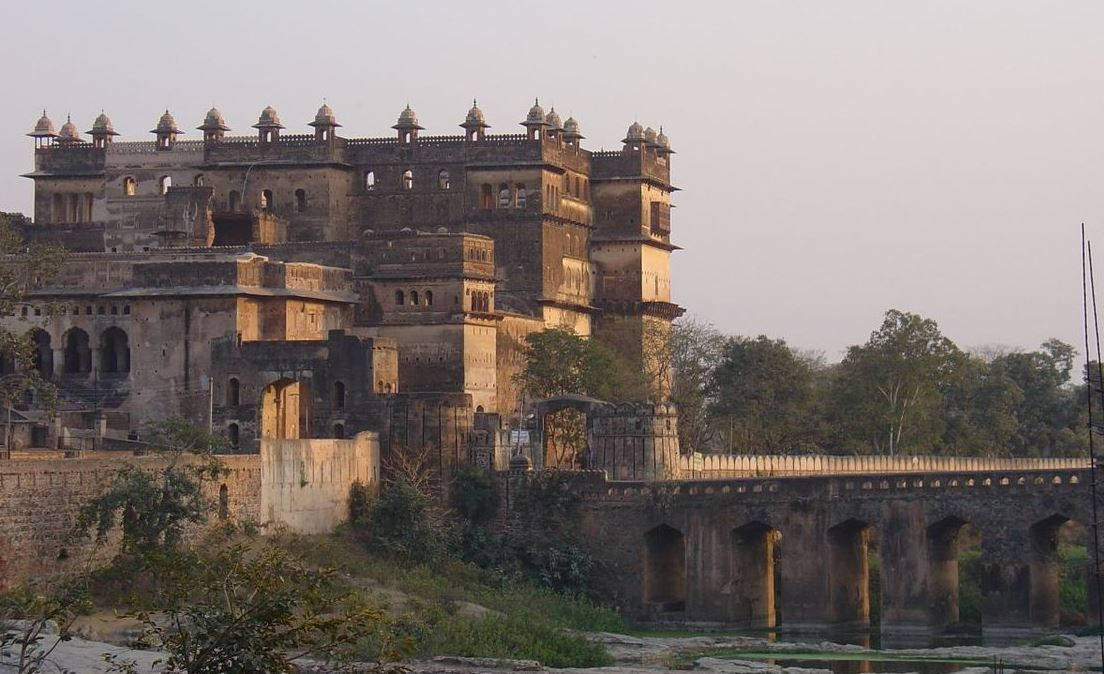
- View of the fort complex and bridge

Site information
- Type: Fort
- Open to the public: Yes
- Condition: Abandoned

Location
- Orchha Fort complex Orchha Fort complex (India)
- Coordinates: 25.35°N 78.64°E

Site history
- Built: 16th–17th centuries
- Materials: Stone, brick and mortar

The Orchha Fort complex, which houses a large number of ancient monuments consisting of the fort, palaces, temple, and other edifices, is located in the Orchha town in the Indian state of Madhya Pradesh. The fort and other structures within it were built by the Bundela Rajputs starting from the early 16th century by King Rudra Pratap Singh of the Orchha State and others who followed him.

The fort complex, which is accessed from an arched causeway, leads to a large gateway. This is followed by a large quadrangular open yard surrounded by palaces. These are Raja Mahal or Raja Mandir, Sheesh Mahal, Jahangir Mahal, a temple, gardens and pavilions. The battlements of the fort have ornamentation. Notable architectural features in the fort complex are projecting balconies, open flat areas and decorated latticed windows.

== Location ==
The fort complex is located in the Nivadi district of Madhya Pradesh in the erstwhile state of Orchha. The fort complex is within an island formed by the confluence of the Betwa River and Jamni River in Orchha town. Approach to the complex from the eastern part of the market in the town is through a multiple arched bridge with 14 arches built in granite stones.

Orchha town is approximately 80 kilometres (50 mi) away from Tikamgarh town, which is the district headquarters of the district of the same name. Jhansi town is 15 kilometres (9.3 mi) away. Orchha is a railway station of the Central Railway on the Jhansi-Manikpur section.

== History ==
The fort was built following the founding of the Orchha State in 1501 AD by Rudra Pratap Singh (r. 1501–1531), a Bundela Rajput. The palaces and temples within the fort complex were built over a period of time by successive Maharajas of the Orchha State. Of these, the Raja Mandir or Raja Mahal was built by Madhukar Shah who ruled from 1554 to 1591. Jahangir Mahal and Sawan Bhadon Mahal were built during the reign of Vir Singh Deo (r. 1605–1627). The features of "pepper pots and domes" seen in the fort complex, inspired Lutyens in the architecture of the structures which he built in New Delhi.

== Monuments ==
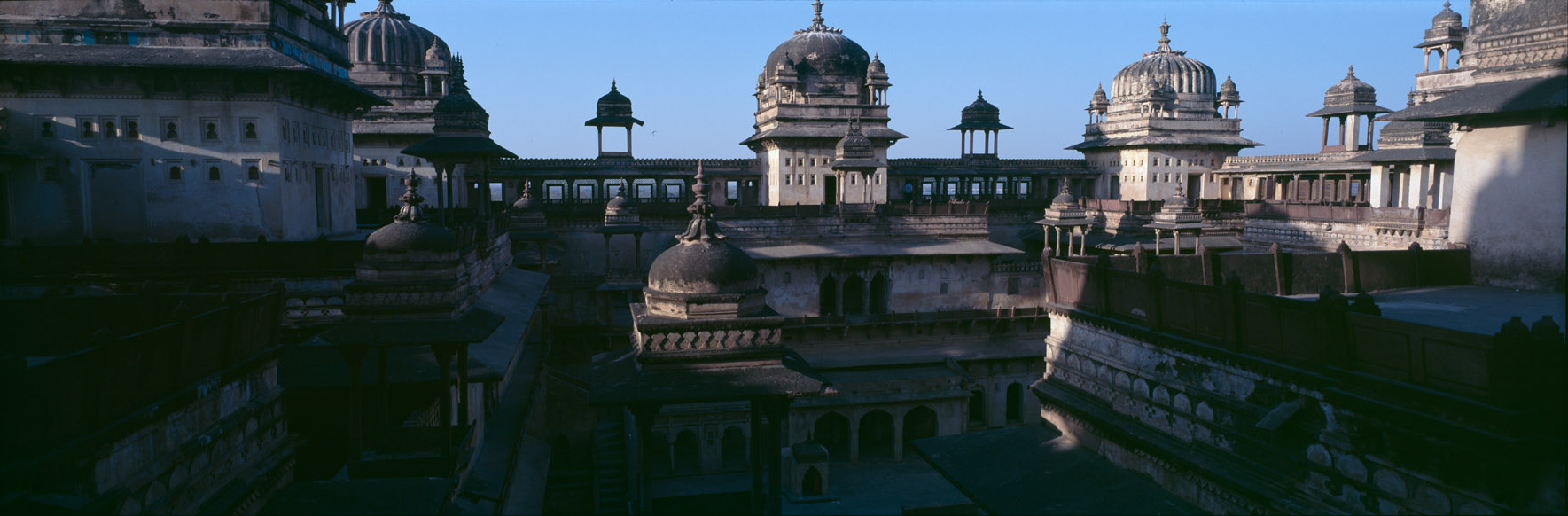
Palaces in the Orchha Fort complex

The fort complex, accessed from an arched causeway, leads to a large gateway followed by a large quadrangular open space which is surrounded by palaces such as Raja Mahal or Raja Mandir, Sheesh Mahal, Jahangir Mahal, a temple, gardens and pavilions. The fort walls have battlements, which have ornamentation. Notable architectural features seen in the fort complex consist of projected balconies, open flat areas and decorated latticed windows.

=== Raja Mahal ===
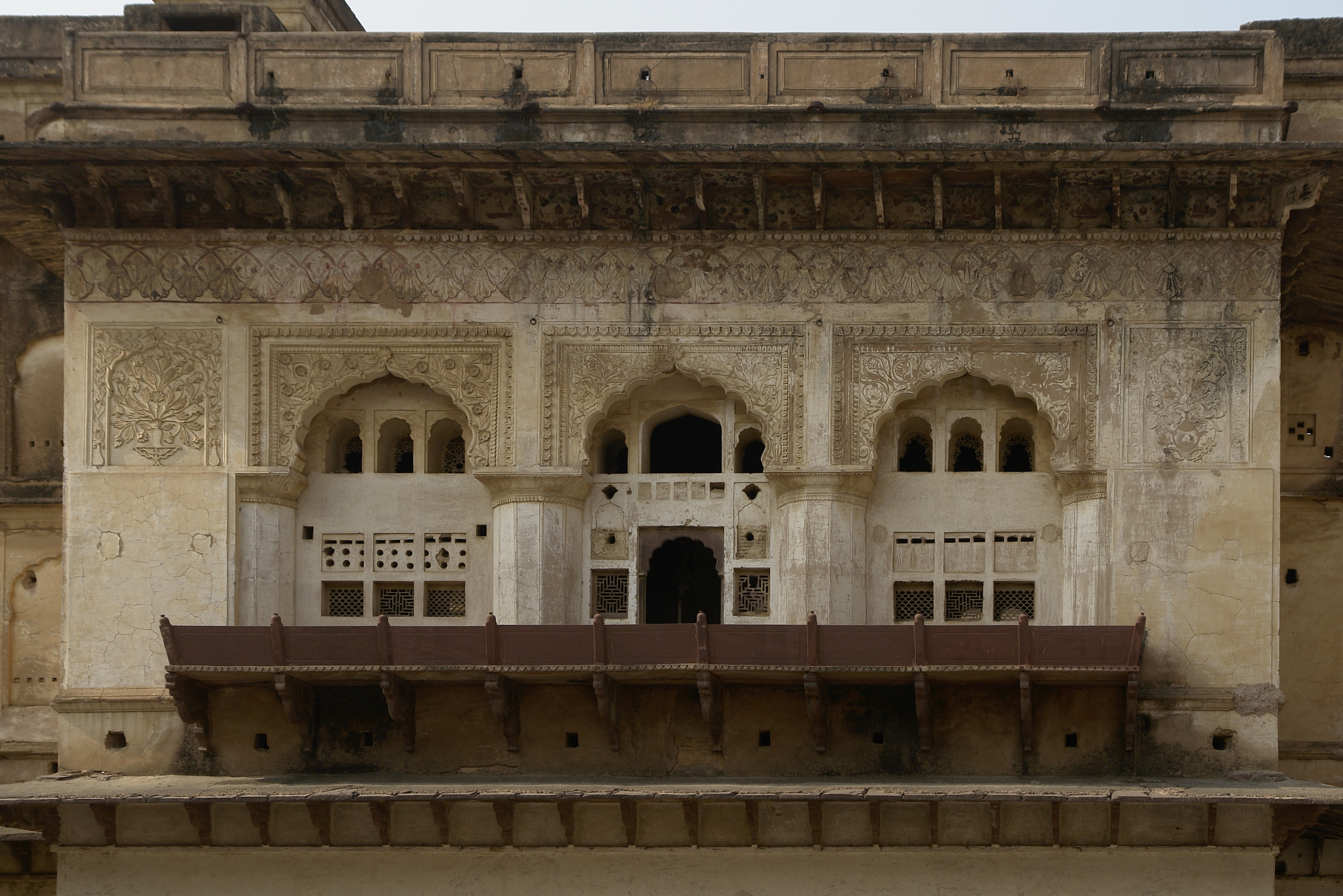
Raja Mahal

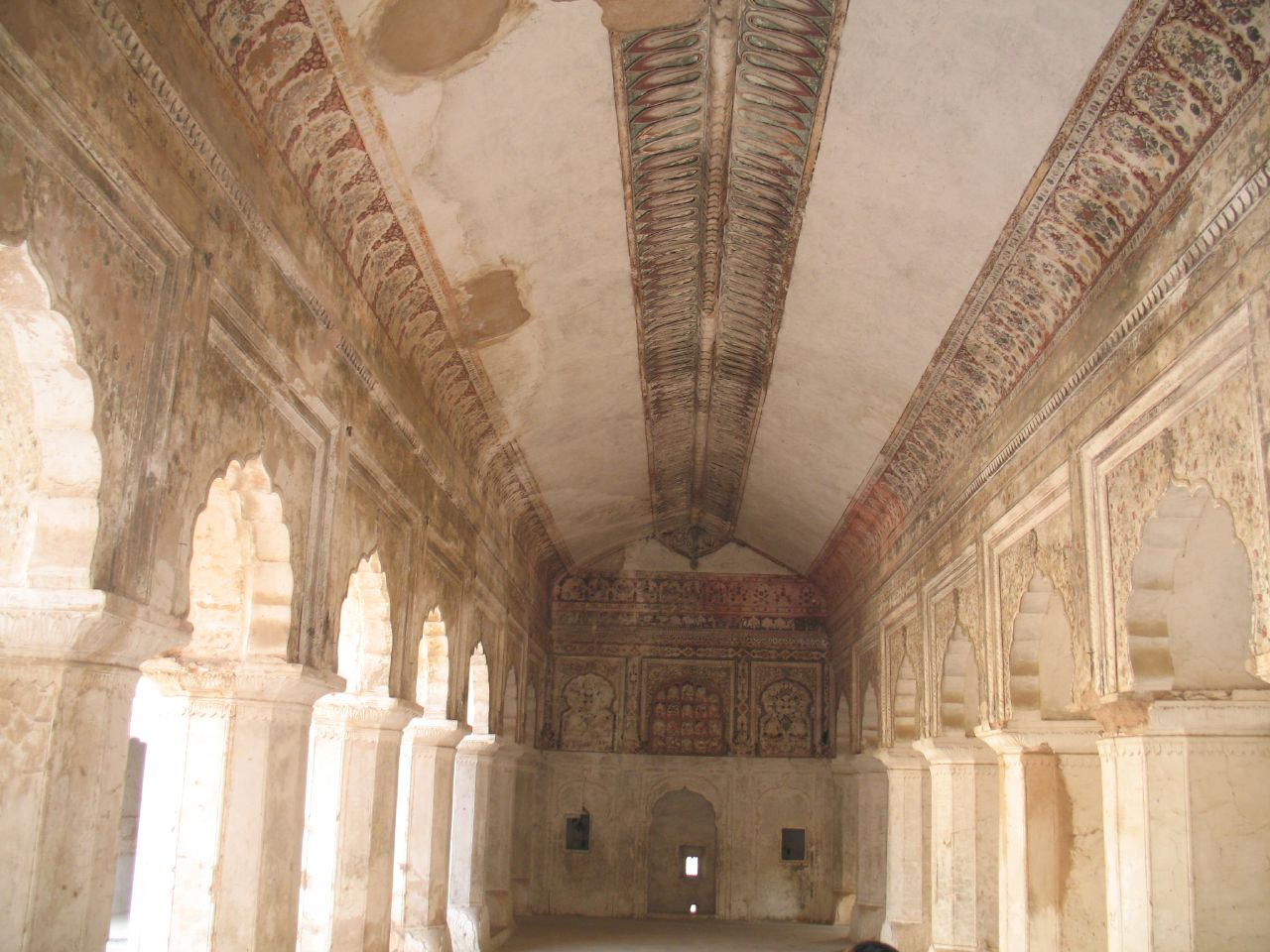
Paintings in Raja Mahal

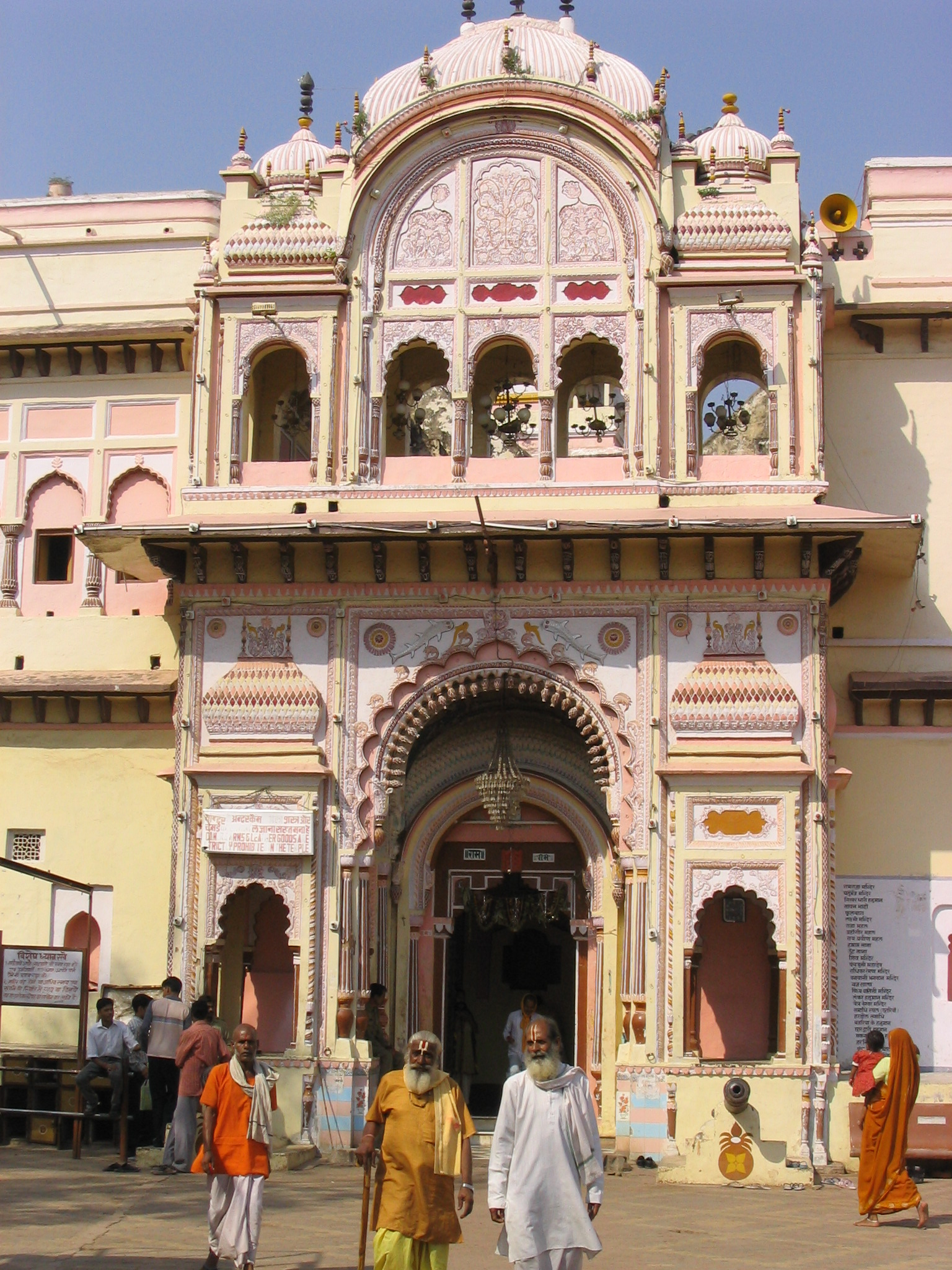
Ram Raja Temple

The Raja Mahal (King's Palace), where the kings and the queens had resided till it was abandoned in 1783, was built in the early part of 16th century. Its exterior is simple and unembellished, but the interior chambers of the palace are elaborately royal in their architectural design, decorated with murals of social and religious themes of gods, mythical animals, and people. In the upper floor of the palace, there are traces of mirrors in the ceilings and walls. Its windows, arcaded passages, and layout plan are designed in such a way that the "sunlight and shadow create areas of different moods and temperatures throughout the day". The interior walls of the Mahal have murals of Lord Vishnu. The Mahal has several secret passages.

A part of this Mahal was converted into a temple and named Rama Raja Temple in honour of the god Rama. There is legend associated with naming it as a temple. According to a local legend, the temple was built following Rani Ganeshkuwari, the queen getting a "dream visitation" by Lord Rama directing her to build a temple for Him; while Madhukar Shah was a devotee of Krishna, his wife's dedication was to Rama. Following this, a new temple known as the Chaturbuj Temple was approved to be built, and the queen went to Ayodhya to obtain an image of Lord Rama that was to be enshrined in her new temple. When she came back from Ayodhya with the image of Rama, initially she kept the idol in her palace as the Chaturbuj Temple was still under construction. She was, however, unaware of an injunction that the image to be deified in a temple could not be kept in a palace. Once the temple construction was completed and the idol of the lord had to be moved for installation at the Chatrubhuj Temple, it refused to be shifted from the palace. Hence, instead of the Chaturbhuj Temple, the Rama's idol remained in the palace whereas the Chaturbhuj Temple remained without an idol in its sanctum. As Rama was worshipped in the palace, part of the palace was converted into the Rama Raja Temple; it is the only shrine in the country where Rama is worshipped as a King. The temple is guarded by a police force and the deity, Lord Rama, is considered as the king and is given a gun salute of honour every day.

=== Sheesh Mahal ===
Sheesh Mahal is flanked on either side by the Raja Mahal and the Jahangir Mahal. This has royal accommodation, which was built for King Udait Singh. It has now been converted into a hotel with suites on the upper floor. There is also a large hall with high ceiling, which is the dining hall.

=== Jahangir Mahal ===
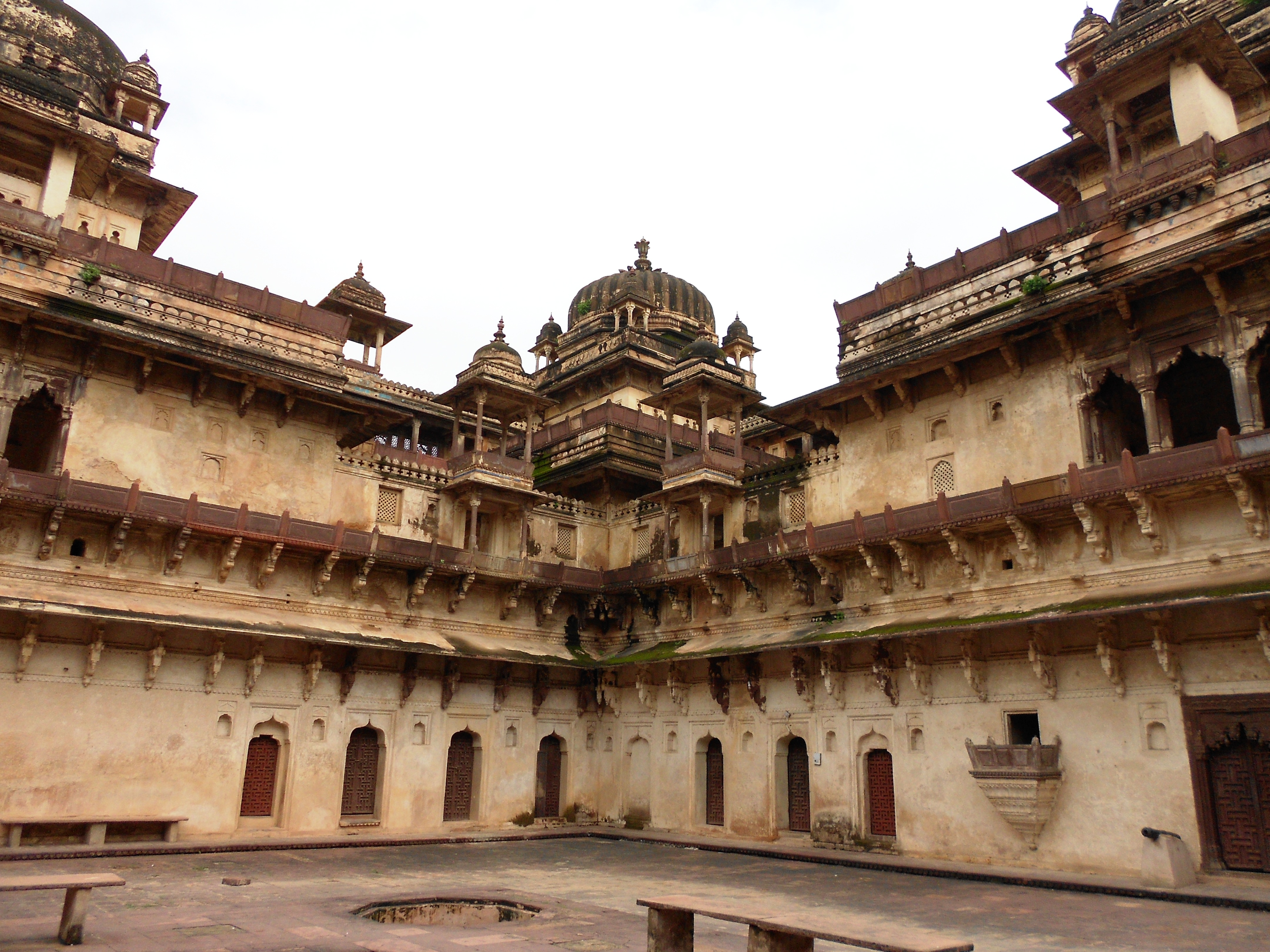
Jahangir Mahal, Orchha.

Jahangir Mahal is a palace that was exclusively built by Bir Singh Deo in 1605 to humor the Mughal emperor Jahangir who was a guest of the Maharaja for one night only. The palace is built in four levels with architectural features of both Muslim and Rajput architecture. Its layout is a symmetrical square, built in the inner courtyard of the fort, and has eight large domes. It has a plethora of rooms with arcaded openings, projecting platforms and windows with lattice design work. The roof above the top floor of this Mahal is accessed through a steep stairway. It provides views of the temples and the Betwa River outside the fort complex. The palace also houses a small archaeological museum.

The entrance gate from this palace, which was earlier the main gate and which has carved ornamentation, leads to the royal baths and then to a small subpalace, built within a garden in typical Mughal architectural style: the Pravin Rai Mahal. This was built for Rai Parveen, the female escort of the Raja Indrajit; her large-size portrait in a revealing and seductive attire adorns hall in this Mahal. She was a poet and musician. The building is a double-storied structure built with bricks, rising to the height of the trees in the surrounding, Anand Mahal gardens. The garden is laid out with octagonal flower beds and has good network of water supply. There are niches in the Mahal which permit natural light to the main hall and smaller rooms.

It is said that Emperor Akbar (r. 1556 – 1605) who was enamored by Parveen's beauty, had taken her to his palace in Agra to be his courtesan. But Parveen, who wanted to get out of the situation, composed a gazal or a couplet which stated her status as an already used woman not fit for an emperor, which enabled her to get release from Akbar's court and return to Orchha.

=== Phool Bagh ===
Phool Bagh is a garden in the fort complex. It has a line of water fountains that terminates in a "palace-pavilion" which has eight pillars. Below this garden is an underground structure that was used by royalty as a cool summer retreat. This cooling system consists of water ventilation system that is linked to an underground palace with "Chandan Katora", which is in the shape of a bowl from where fountains of droplets trickle through the roof creating rainfall.

== See also ==
- Jahangir Mahal, Orchha
- Pravin Rai Mahal (Tope Khana)

== Bibliography ==
- The British Library Board staff (26 March 2009). "Palace at Orcha". British Library Online a Gallery.
- Data And Expo India Pvt Ltd. staff (2015). RBS Visitors Guide INDIA – Madhya Pradesh: Madhya Pradesh Travel Guide. Data and Expo India Pvt. Ltd. ISBN 978-93-80844-80-0.
- Deshpande, Aruna (2000). India, a travel guide. Crest Pub. House. ISBN 978-81-242-0171-8.
- Fass, Virginia (1986). The forts of India. Rupa in association with Oberoi Hotels International. ISBN 978-0-00-217590-6.
- Goodearth Publications staff (2012). Temples of Madhya Pradesh. Goodearth Publications. ISBN 978-93-80262-49-9.
- Madhya Pradesh Tourism staff. "Orchha". Official website of Madhya Pradesh Tourism. Archived from the original on 4 March 2016.
- Mahale, Sneha (1 July 2015). "Hidden beauty: Feast your eyes on forts, palaces and temples in Orchha". Hindustan Times. Archived from the original on 22 June 2015.
- Mookherjee, Sheema (8 August 2013). "The city of Orchha". BBC.
- Tikamgarh District Administration. "Tourist Places". Orchha. Official website of Tikamgarh District Administration.
- Time Out staff (2010). Time Out India: Perfect Places to Stay, Eat and Explore. Time Out Guides. ISBN 978-1-84670-164-1.
