= Sanadhya Brahmin =

Brahmin sub-caste in India

Sanadhya Brahmin (also spelled as Sanadh, Sanah , Sanidya or Sandhya) is an endogamous sub-caste of Brahmins. Their main concentration is in western Uttar Pradesh, Rajasthan, Delhi and Madhya Pradesh area of India. The Hindi poet Keshabdasa Mishra was a Sanadhya, and praised his community in his book "Ramchandra Chandrika". Though an endogamous community, in some cases they intermarry with Gaurs. In Western Uttar Pradesh, Kanyakubja Brahmin takes the daughter of Sanadhyas, but does not give him his own daughter in marriage. The districts of Aligarh and Bulandshahr are situated on the border of Sanadhyas and Gaurs where marriages take place on the basis of equality between Sanadhyas and Gaurs.

== Notable people ==
- Keshabdasa Mishra
- Pardeep Sharma
- Totaram Sanadhya

== See also ==
- Gaur Brahmins
