= Jahangir Mahal, Orchha =

Coordinates: 25.350697°N 78.644219°E

Jahangir Mahal
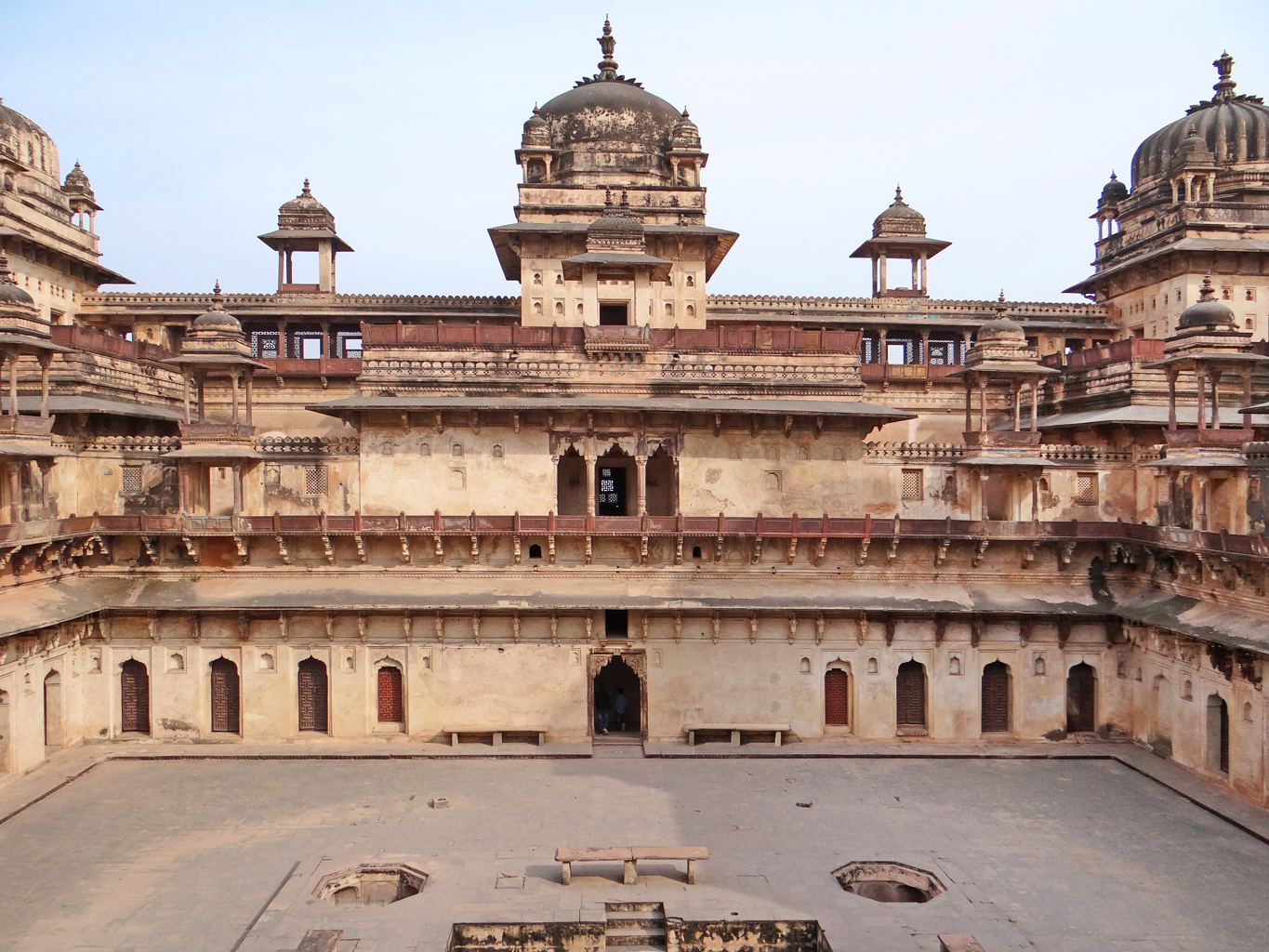
- Interactive map of Jahangir Mahal
- Type: Palace
- Etymology: Jahangir
- Location: Orchha, Madhya Pradesh

History
- Built: 17th century CE

Jahangir Mahal, Citadel of Jahangir, Orchha Palace, Mahal-e-Jahangir Orchha, Jahangir Citadel is a citadel and garrison located in Orchha, Madhya Pradesh, India.

== History ==
The establishment of the Jahangir Mahal dates back to the 17th century C E when the ruler of the region Vir Singh Deo built the structure as a symbol of warm reception of the Mughal Emperor Jahangir, during the latter’s first visit to the city. The entrance of the palace is marked by an artistic and traditional gateway. The front wall of the structure faces to the east and is covered with turquoise tiles. Jahangir Mahal is a three-storied structure that is marked by stylishly hanging balconies, porches, and apartments.

The domes of the Jahangir Mahal, were built according to Timurid customs; its grand Iwans are large enough to accommodate the entry of war elephants, and its high position over the landscape allowed cannons superior range.

== See also ==
- Orchha Fort complex for the larger architectural context
- Pravin Rai Mahal, a subpalace

== Bibliography ==
- "Orchha Town". The Imperial Gazetteer of India, Vol. 19. Oxford at Clarendon Press. 1909. pp. 247–248.
- "Orchha State". The Imperial Gazetteer of India, Vol. 19. Oxford at Clarendon Press. 1909. pp. 241–247.
