= Chaturbhuj Temple (Orchha) =

Hindu temple in Madhya Pradesh, India

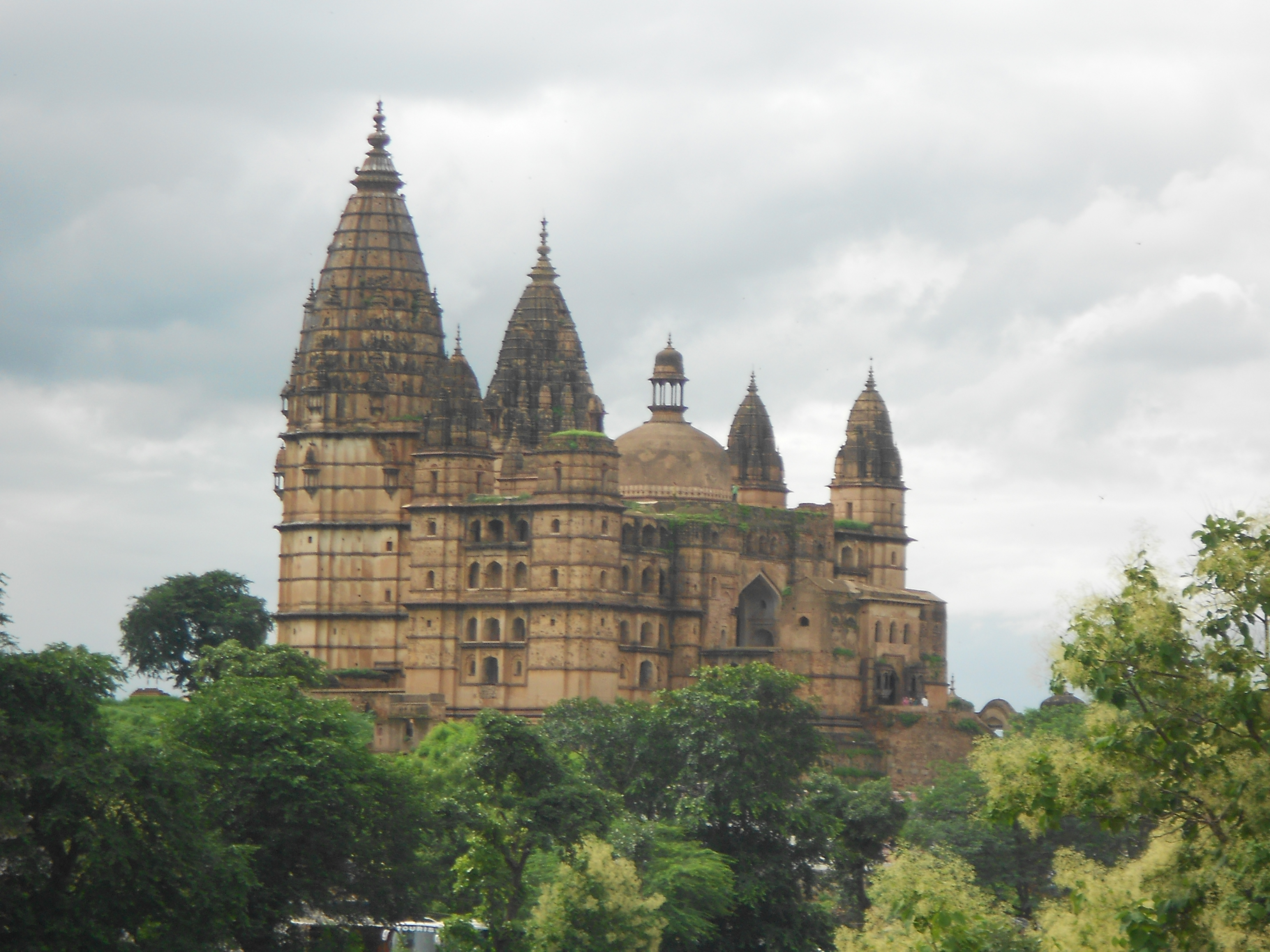
- Chaturbhuj Temple at Orchha

- Location in Madhya Pradesh

Religion
- Affiliation: Hinduism
- District: Niwari district
- Deity: Dedicated to Rama (a form of Vishnu)

Location
- Location: Orchha
- State: Madhya Pradesh
- Country: India
- Coordinates: 25°21′0″N 78°8′24″E

Architecture
- Type: Nagara architecture, Māru-Gurjara architecture
- Creator: Bundela Rulers of Orchha State
- Completed: 16th century
- Temple: 1

Chaturbhuj Temple, dedicated to Vishnu, is a Hindu temple, situated at Orchha in Madhya Pradesh, India. The name Chaturbhuj is a combination of 'chatur' meaning "four" and 'bhuj' meaning "arms" which literally translates to "one who has four arms" and refers to Rama, an Avatar of Vishnu. The temple has a complex multi-storied structural view which is a blend of temple, fort and palatial architectural features.

The temple was originally built to deify an image of Rama, as the chief deity, which was installed in the Rama Raja Temple inside the Orchha Fort complex. At present an image of Radha Krishna is worshiped in the temple. The temple is noted for having one of the tallest Vimana among Hindu temples standing at 344 feet.

== Location ==
The temple is located in the Orchha town, just outside the limits of the Orchha Fort complex, to the south of the Rama Raja Temple. It is in an island formed by the Betwa River. Orchha is accessible by air from Gwalior airport which is 119 kilometres (74 mi) away; regular flights operate from Delhi and Bhopal. By road it is accessible from a diversion from the Jhansi-Khajuraho highway. The nearest rail-head is Jhansi which is 16 kilometres (9.9 mi) away.

== History ==
The temple was constructed by the Bundela Rajputs of the kingdom of Orchha during the reign of Mughal emperor Akbar. Its construction was begun by Madhukar Shah and completed by his son, Vir Singh Deo in the 16th century. Madhukar Shah built the temple for his wife, Rani Ganeshkuwari.

According to a local legend, the temple was built after the queen had a "dream visitation" by Lord Rama directing her to build a temple for Him; while Madhukar Shah was a devotee of Krishna, his wife's dedication was to Rama. Following the approval to build the Chaturbhuja Temple, the queen went to Ayodhya to obtain an image of Lord Rama that was to be enshrined in her new temple. When she came back from Ayodhya with the image of Rama, initially she kept the idol in her palace, called Rani Mahal, as the Chaturbhuj Temple was still under construction. She was, however, unaware of an injunction that the image to be deified in a temple could not be kept in a palace. Once the temple construction was completed and the idol of the lord had to be moved for installation at the Chatrubhuj Temple, it refused to be shifted from the palace. Hence, instead of the Chaturbuj temple, the Rama's idol remained in the palace whereas the Chaturbhuj Temple remained without an idol in its sanctum. As Rama was worshiped in the palace it was converted into the Ram Raja Temple; it is the only shrine in the country where Rama is worshiped as a king.

The management of the temple on a day-to-day basis is the responsibility of the Ram Raja Trust. However, the conservation of the temple structure itself is under the control of the State Archaeology Department.

== Features ==
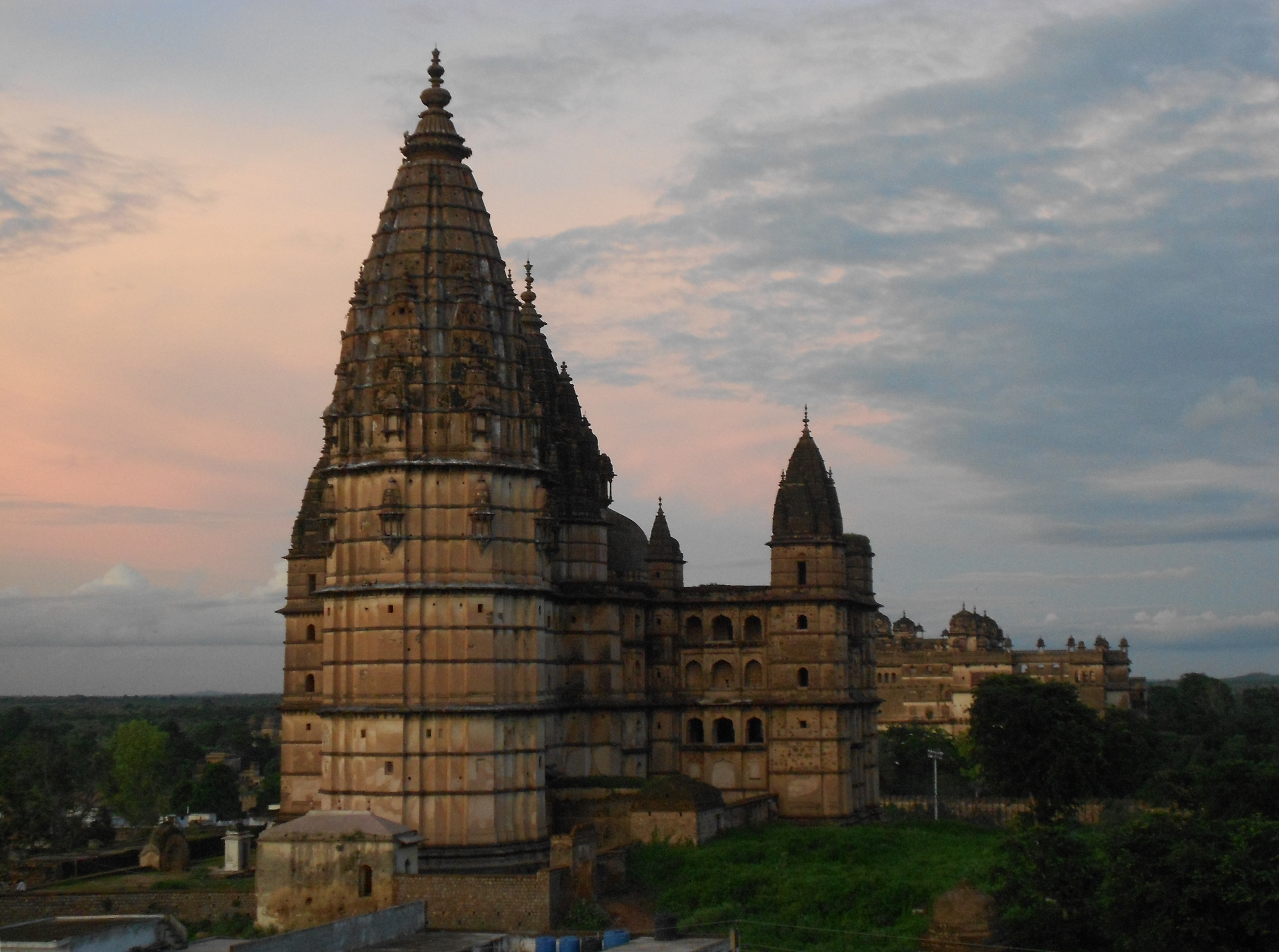
Chaturbhuj Temple at Orchha, is noted for having one of the tallest Vimana among Hindu temples standing at 344 feet.

The Chaturbhuj temple has tall spires in the shape of pine cones built atop a high platform of 4.5 metres (15 ft) height. The overall height of the temple is 105 metres (344 ft) high and its layout is compared to that of a Basilica and planned to resemble the four arms of Vishnu for whom it was built. The imposing view of the temple is that of multi-storied palace with arcaded openings, a very large entrance, a large central tower and fortifications. The climb to the temple facade involves climbing steep and narrow steps numbering 67, each of about 1 metre (3 ft 3 in) height, forming a winding stairway. The interior has many halls and the main hall or mandapa of the temple is built in the shape of a cross or cruciform and is stated to be a mix of Māru-Gurjara architecture, and it is at right angles to the vestibule, of identical layout on either side.

The temple's exterior is richly ornamented with lotus symbols. The building displays a blend of religious and secular styles taken from temple and fort architecture. The temple faces east and is located on an axis with the nearby Ram Mandir, which is inside Orchha Fort complex. However, there is not much ornamentation in the interior part of the temple. The ceiling of the central dome, which has several kiosks, is covered with bloomed lotuses. The exterior architectural features include "petaled stone moldings, painted floral and geometric designs, cornices supported on lotus bud pendantive brackets, jewelled stone girdles, false balcony projections".

It is said that the towers of the temple, when built, had been covered with gold plating which over the years has been pilfered.

The roof of the temple is accessible from where one can see the scenic views of the Orchha town, the winding Betwa River, the Sawan Bhadon, the Rama Raja Temple and the imposing Laxmi Narayan temple some distance away.

== See also ==
- List of tallest structures built before the 20th century
