= Pravin Rai Mahal =

Coordinates: 25°21′06″N 78°38′41″E

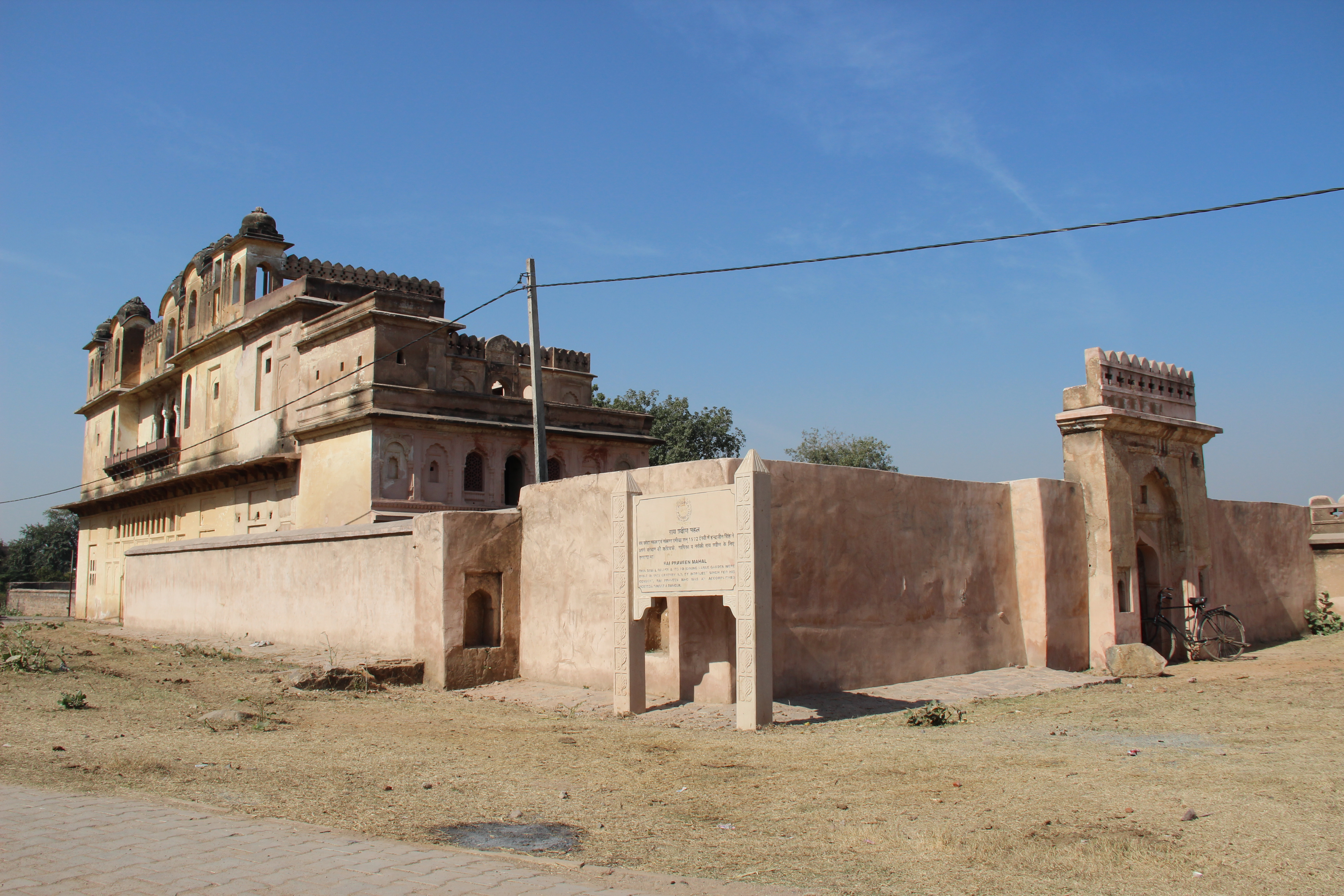
- Interactive map of Pravin Rai Mahal
- Location: Orchha

History
- Built: 16th century
- Built for: Pravin Rai

Pravin Rai Mahal is a palace in Madhya Pradesh built by prince (and later King) Indrajit Singh in 1618. It was built for his love interest, Pravin Rai, who was a beautiful poet and musician, also known as the "Nightingale of Orchha". It is a state protected monument. The other names of this palace are Anand Mandal Bagh and Rai Praveen Manika Bhavan. It is also known as 'Tope Khana' since later in time, it was used as a lookout post for Orchha Fort.

== Architecture ==
The palace has three stories. There is a central hall on the second floor with multiple paintings and depictions of various moods of Pravin Rai. There is also a garden attached to the palace which is divided into two parts. The palace has a large mansion, and alongside, it has small chambers with large windows. There is good lighting and circulation of air.

The palace's semi-subterranean summer room has been measured cooling its air to more than 10 degrees below exterior temperatures, using passive cooling.

== Legend of Pravin Rai ==
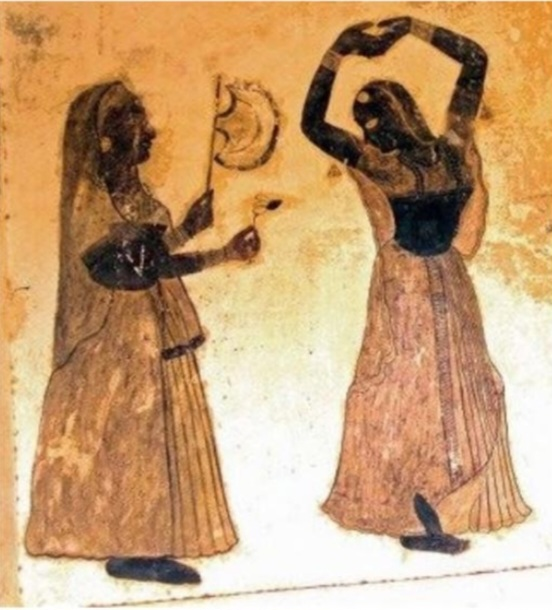
Rai Praveen depicted with an attendant

Pravin Rai was a favourite courtesan of King Indrajit Singh of Orchha State. It is said that Emperor Akbar summoned Pravin Rai to his court after hearing about her beauty and poetry. Pravin Rai reached the court and said a couplet,

“Vinit Rai Praveen ki, suniye sah sujan. Juthi patar bhakat hain, bari, bayas, swan”

It translated to - 'Oh you great and wise! Please hear the plea of Rai Praveen. Only someone from a low caste, barber or scavengers would eat from a plat that was partaken by someone else'. With this, she indicated that she was already in love with Indrajeet. Akbar was impressed from this and she was sent back to Indrajeet with respect. Rai Praveen is the central character in Sudheer Maurya's Hindi Novel Indrapriya.

== See also ==
- Jahangir Mahal, Orchha
- Orchha Fort complex
