= Development Alternatives Group =

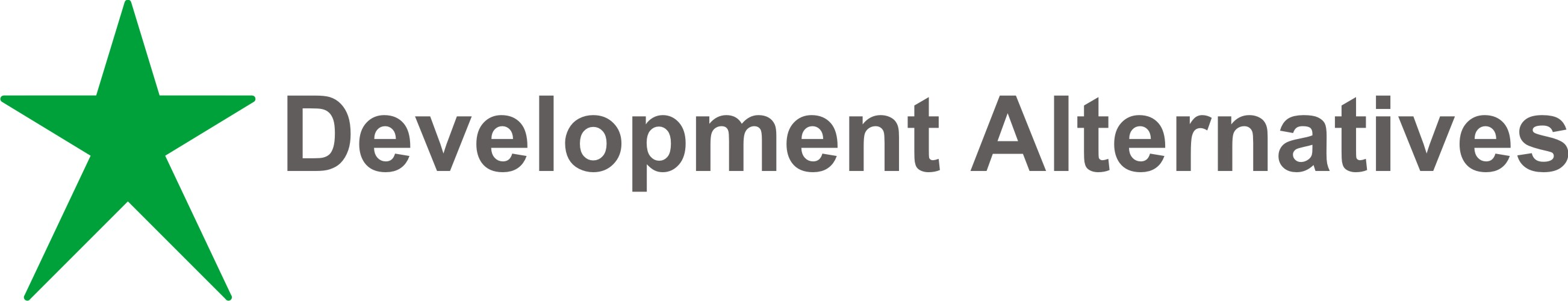
- Founded: 1982
- Founder: Ashok Khosla and Christian deLaet
- Type: Social Enterprise (Not-for-profit)
- Purpose: Sustainability, Environment, Development
- Headquarters: New Delhi, India
- Region served: Worldwide
- Employees: 340

The Development Alternatives Group is a social enterprise and think tank organisation based in New Delhi, India involved in sustainable development. It focuses on green economic development, social empowerment and environmental management.

== History ==
The Development Alternatives Group was established in 1982 as a social enterprise set-up by Ashok Khosla to create sustainable solutions for social and economic development.

== Group ==
The Development Alternatives Group comprises the not-for-profit flagship Society for Development Alternatives (DA), the business-oriented incubator Technology and Action for Rural Advancement (TARA), and its commercial subsidiaries, which include TARA Machines and Tech Services (TMTS), TARA Environmental Services Pvt Ltd (TARAenviro), TARAhaat Information and Marketing Services Ltd (TARAhaat), TARA Nirman Kendra (TNK) and DESI Power Orchha Pvt Ltd (DESI Power).

=== TARA Machines and Tech Services (TMTS) ===
TARA Machines and Tech Services Pvt. Ltd., delivers green business solutions to small and medium enterprises (SMEs) for building construction, waste recycling, and handmade paper production. TMTS is a specialist company in Eco-concrete Technology, Eco-Kiln Technology, Fly Ash Technology, and Recycling Technology.

=== TARAhaat Information and Marketing Services Ltd (TARAhaat) ===
Launched in 2000, TARAhaat Information and Marketing Services Ltd. introduced Information Technology (IT) services in rural India. These services include literacy, vocational skills, and other products needed in rural communities.

==== TARA Environmental Services Pvt Ltd (TARAenviro) ====
Incorporated in 2008, TARAenviro, a part of the Development Alternatives Group, is a private company that markets water testing kits and filters under the Jal-TARA brand, which helps test the potability of water and offers cost-effective solutions for improving water quality.

TARAenviro products:

- Jal – TARA Water Testing Kits
- Jal – TARA Water Filters
- TARA Aqua-check vials

== Development Alternatives Programs ==
=== Radio Bundelkhand ===
Based at TARAgram Orchha, DA’s Technology Centre at Tikamgarh district of Madhya Pradesh, Radio Bundelkhand is an ICT-based community radio initiative started by Development Alternatives (DA) and jointly managed by the local community and DA.
