= Indian wedding invitations =

Indian wedding invitations are made and distributed to invite guests to wedding celebrations and to honor and commemorate weddings. A wedding invitation may be referred to as a kankotri, laganapatrikā, or Nimantraṇa patra/Patrikā (निमन्त्रण पत्र/पत्रिका).

Since the medieval period, wedding invitations have carried great importance in the Indian subcontinent. Wedding invitations are one of the earliest personal applications of Tamil print media.

These invitation cards are used for announcing the marriage ceremony, and this process of sending an invitation card to guests and relatives forms an integral part of the ritual. The cards stand out due to their unique patterns, colors and symbols.

== Features ==
Invitations open by invoking various deities.

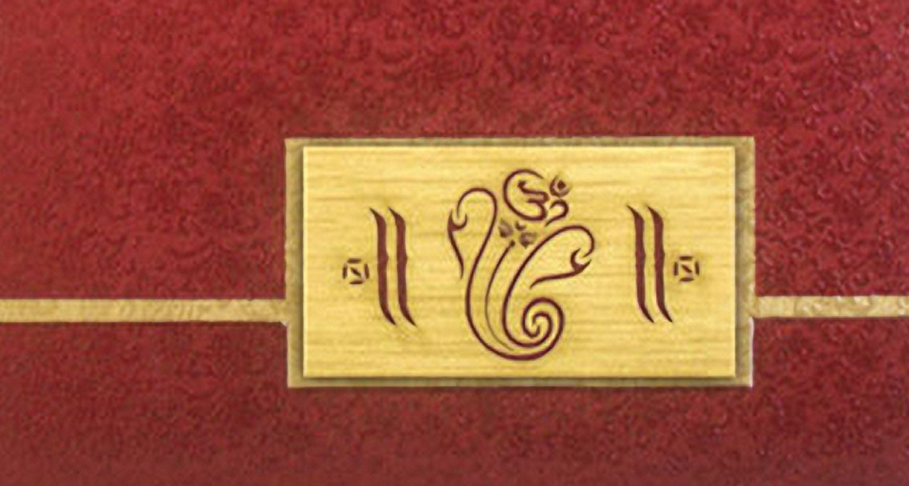
Ganesha on an Indian Wedding Invitation Card. Many Hindu cards have this printed on cover or inside page. Ganesha is believed to bring prosperity to the couple.

== Common symbols ==
Usually for Indian wedding cards have designs like peacock or peacock feather; diya (lamp), swastika, and OM are used for designing these cards. These designs have religious meaning and display Indian culture.

- Ganesh: Lord Ganesha is considered as God of education and wealth. In Indian culture, Lord Ganesha is worshiped first to remove all the obstructions and hurdles and before starting an auspicious event like matrimonial ceremony. Due to this characteristic, the symbol of Lord Ganesha is printed on the Indian wedding cards, with a belief that Lord Ganesha will make the wedding successful and hurdle free.
- Kalasha: The symbol of Kalasha is prominent Vedic symbol which is a vase covered with leaves and symbolizes bliss, abundance and joy.
- Swastika: This Swastika symbol means all is well and is an ancient symbol present in numerous and diverse cultures around the world which symbolizes peace and happiness.
- Doli: This symbol denotes glee, fun, happiness and marks the beginning of an auspicious occasion. It not only brings happiness to the faces of guests who are attending the wedding but also used to seek blessings from the God before starting an event.
- Om: The OM symbol has a deep cultural and religious significance in the Indian society. It is the universally accepted and the supreme symbol of Hinduism all across the globe. This sacred symbol represents ultimate peace and harmony. It is printed on Indian wedding cards to bring harmony and peace to a function like marriage.
- Christian symbols: The symbols printed on the Christian wedding cards are the cross, church, the Lord Jesus and many more. These symbols denote purity, simplicity and holiness. The symbols are believed to bring sanctity to the whole wedding function.
- Muslim symbols In the Muslim community, marriage is regarded as an auspicious occasion and various types of symbols like the Star and Crescent, Bismillah, Allah and many more printed on the wedding invitation card to seek the blessings from the God. Basmala is considered very lucky in Islam, and it is believed that 786 is the number of days in which Allah created the world. It is also used to mark the starting of an auspicious or good event.
