= Jhujhar Singh =

Raja of Orchha from 1627 to 1635

Raja Jhujhar Singh Ju Deo
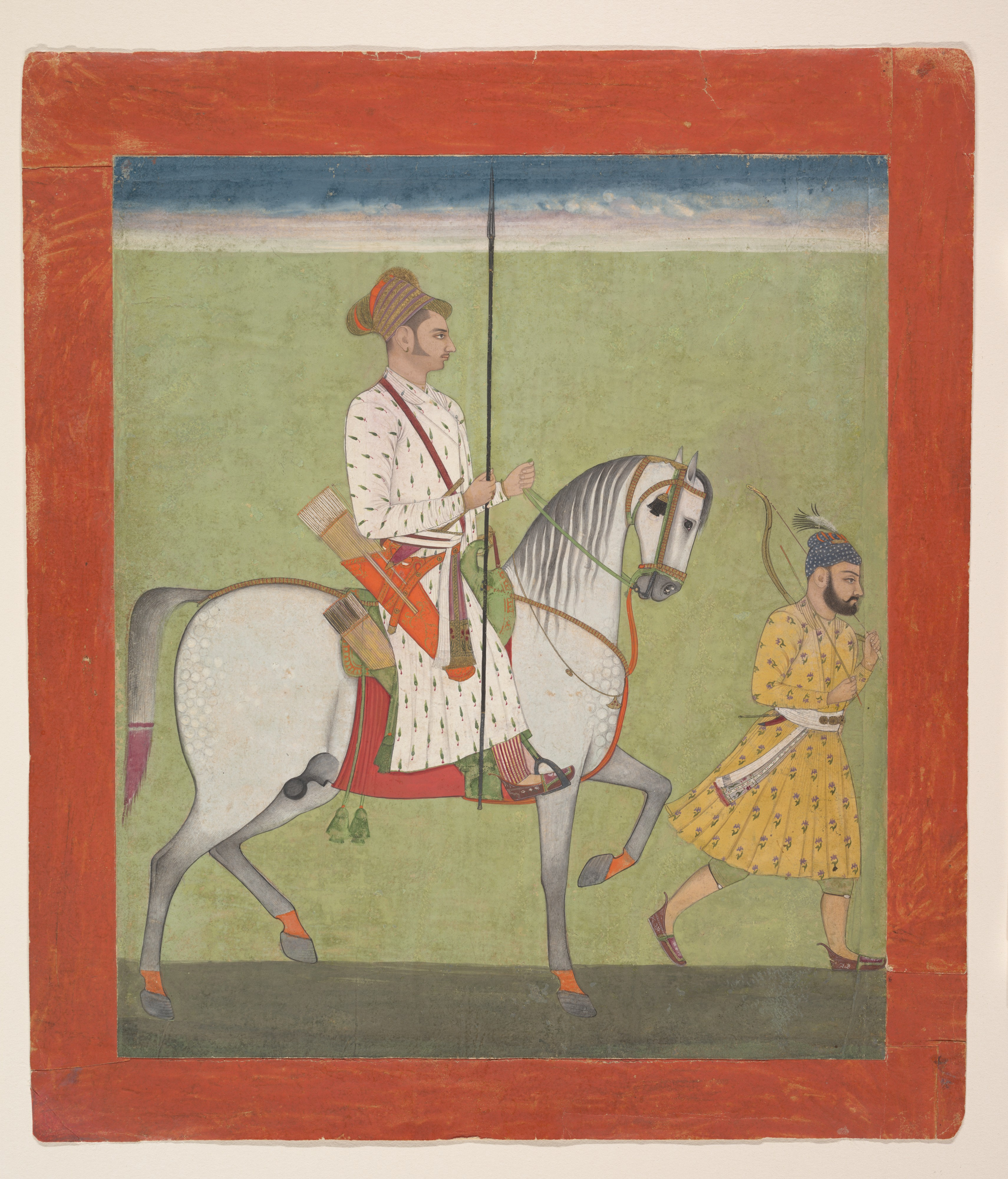
- Jhujhar Singh on Horseback, c. 1720–30

Raja of Orchha
- Reign: 1627 – 14 October 1635
- Coronation: 1627
- Predecessor: Raja Vir Singh Deo
- Died: December 1635
- House: Bundela Rajput
- Religion: Hinduism

Raja Jhujhar Singh Ju Deo (died December 1635) was the Bundela ruler of Orchha Kingdom from 1627 to 1635. He ruled the cultural Bundelkhand region of modern Madhya Pradesh.

Jhujhar Singh was the first-born son of Raja Vir Singh Deo and the senior of his three queens. In 1626, he succeeded his father as ruler and determined not to remain a vassal of the Mughal Empire as his father had been. His attempt to assert independence from Mughal Emperor Shah Jahan led to his downfall. The Mughal army, which was led by the teenager Prince Aurangzeb, conquered his kingdom on 14 October 1635 and forced him to retreat to Chauragarh.

== Death ==
Jujhar Singh had written a letter to Kok Shah, the Gond king of Deogarh, to let him pass through his territory unharmed and was waiting for an answer at Chauragarh. He heard rumors that the king of Deogarh was dead and hence he travelled through his territory toward Golconda. However, he and his son were killed by Gonds in the Kingdom of Chanda in December 1635. Due to Jujhar Singh's attempts at independence, Shah Jahan wrote a farman ordering Khan-i Dauran, Khan-i-Jahan Barha and Firoz Jung to kill Jujhar Singh. Khan-i-Jahan Barha played a crucial role in the suppression of his rebellion. Their heads were cut by Khan-i-Dauran and sent to Firoz Jung to be presented to the Mughal emperor Shah Jahan. The Mughal army recovered treasures worth one crore which Jujhar Singh had hidden in various wells in Deogarh territory.

== Bibliography ==
- Jain, Ravindra K. (2002), Between History and Legend: Status and Power in Bundelkhand, Orient Blackswan, ISBN 978-8-12502-194-0
- Mehta, Jaswant Lal (2005), Advanced Study in the History of Modern India 1707-1813, Sterling Publishers, ISBN 978-1-93270-554-6
- Michael, Thomas (2009), Cuhaj, George S. (ed.), Standard Catalog of World Coins, 1801-1900 (6th ed.), Krause Publications, ISBN 978-1-44022-801-8
