= Orchha =

- City
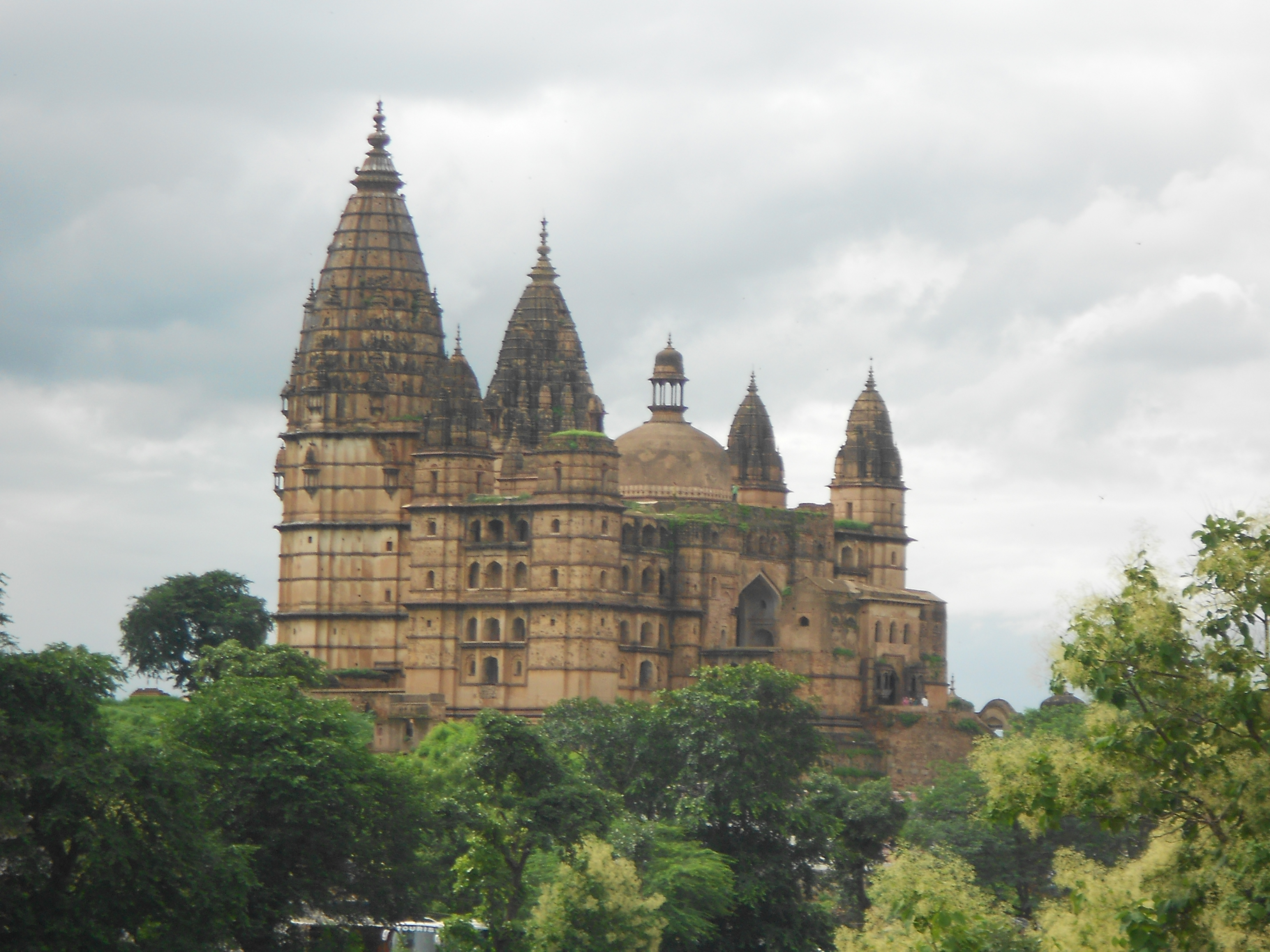
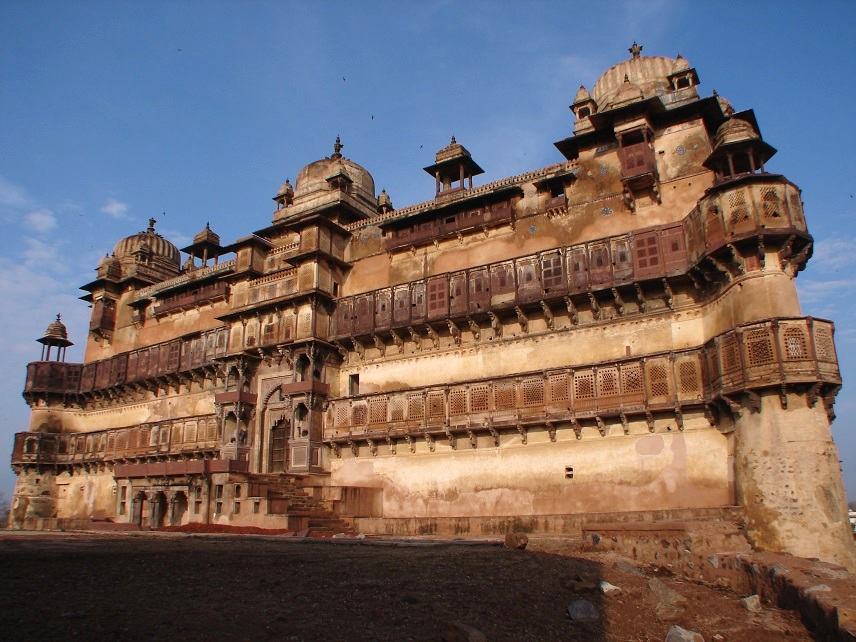
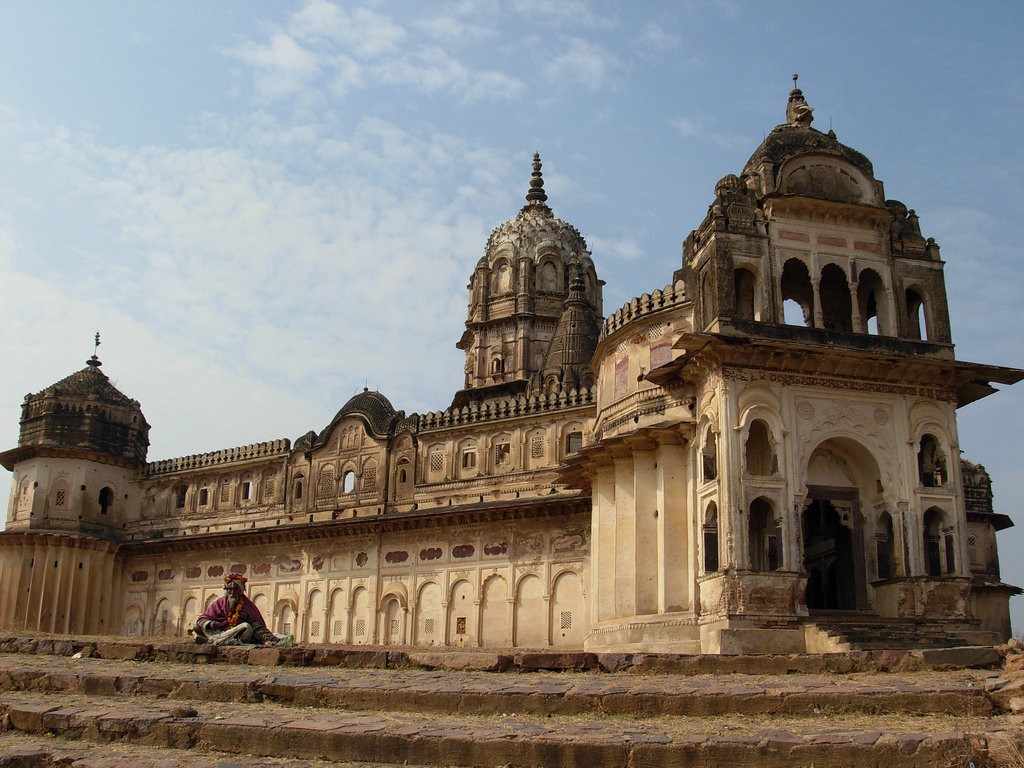
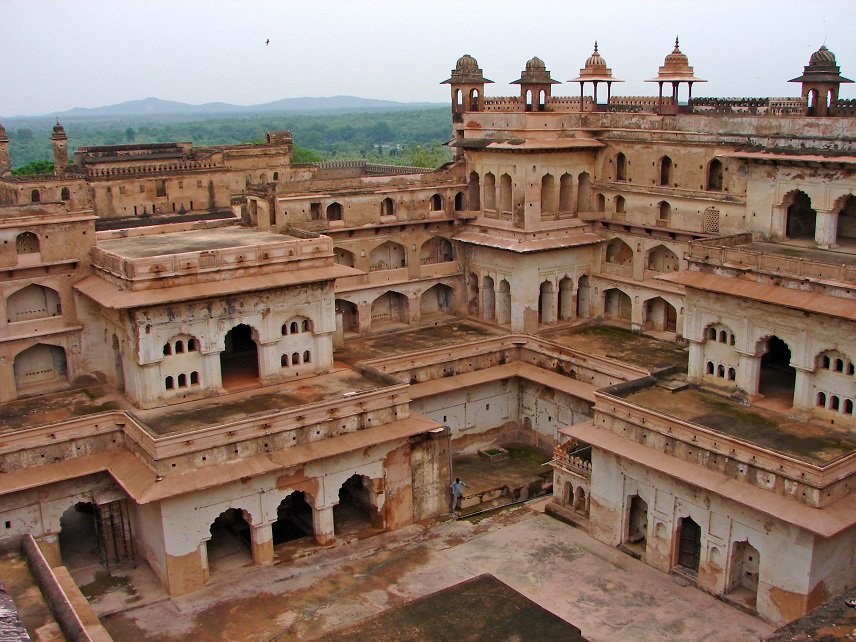
- (clockwise from top) Chaturbhuj Temple, Jahangir Mahal, Raja Mahal, Lakshmi Temple

- Location within Madhya Pradesh Location within India
- Coordinates: 25.35°N 78.64°E
- Country: India
- State: Madhya Pradesh
- District: Niwari
- Founder: Rudra Pratap Singh Bundela
- Elevation: 552 m (1,811 ft)

Population (2020)
  - Total: 10,501

Languages
  - Official: Hindi
- Time zone: UTC+5:30 (IST)
- Telephone code: 07680
- Vehicle registration: MP-71
- Website: ramrajatemple.mp.gov.in

Orchha is a city near the city of Niwari in the Niwari district of Madhya Pradesh state, India. The city was established by a Bundela Rajput ruler Rudra Pratap Singh some time after 1501, as the seat of an eponymous former princely state including parts of central and north India, in the Bundelkhand region. Orchha lies on the Betwa River, 126 km from Gwalior, 89 km from Tikamgarh and 18 km from Jhansi in Uttar Pradesh.

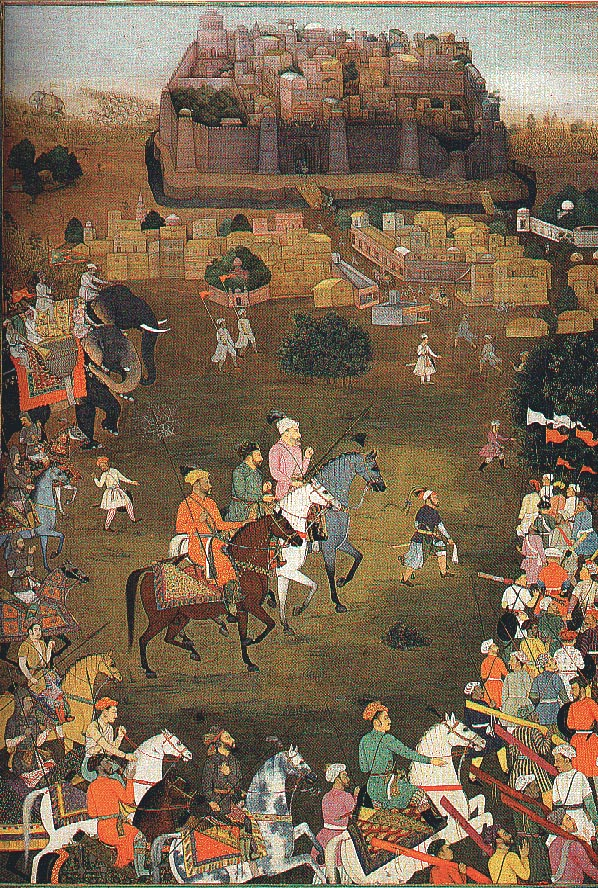
The Mughal Army led by Prince Aurangzeb, Syed Khan-i-Jahan, Abdullah Khan Bahadur Firuz Jang and Khan Dauran enter Orchha.

== History ==
Orchha was founded in 1531 (the 16th century AD) by the Bundela chief, Rudra Pratap Singh, who became the first King of Orchha, (r. 1501–1531) and also built the Fort of Orchha. The Chaturbhuj Temple was built by the queen of Orchha, Ganesh Kunwar (गणेश कुँवर), while Raj Mandir was built by 'Raja Madhukar Shah' during his reign, 1554 to 1591. Orchha was captured by imperial forces of the Mughal Army led by Prince Aurangzeb in October 1635.

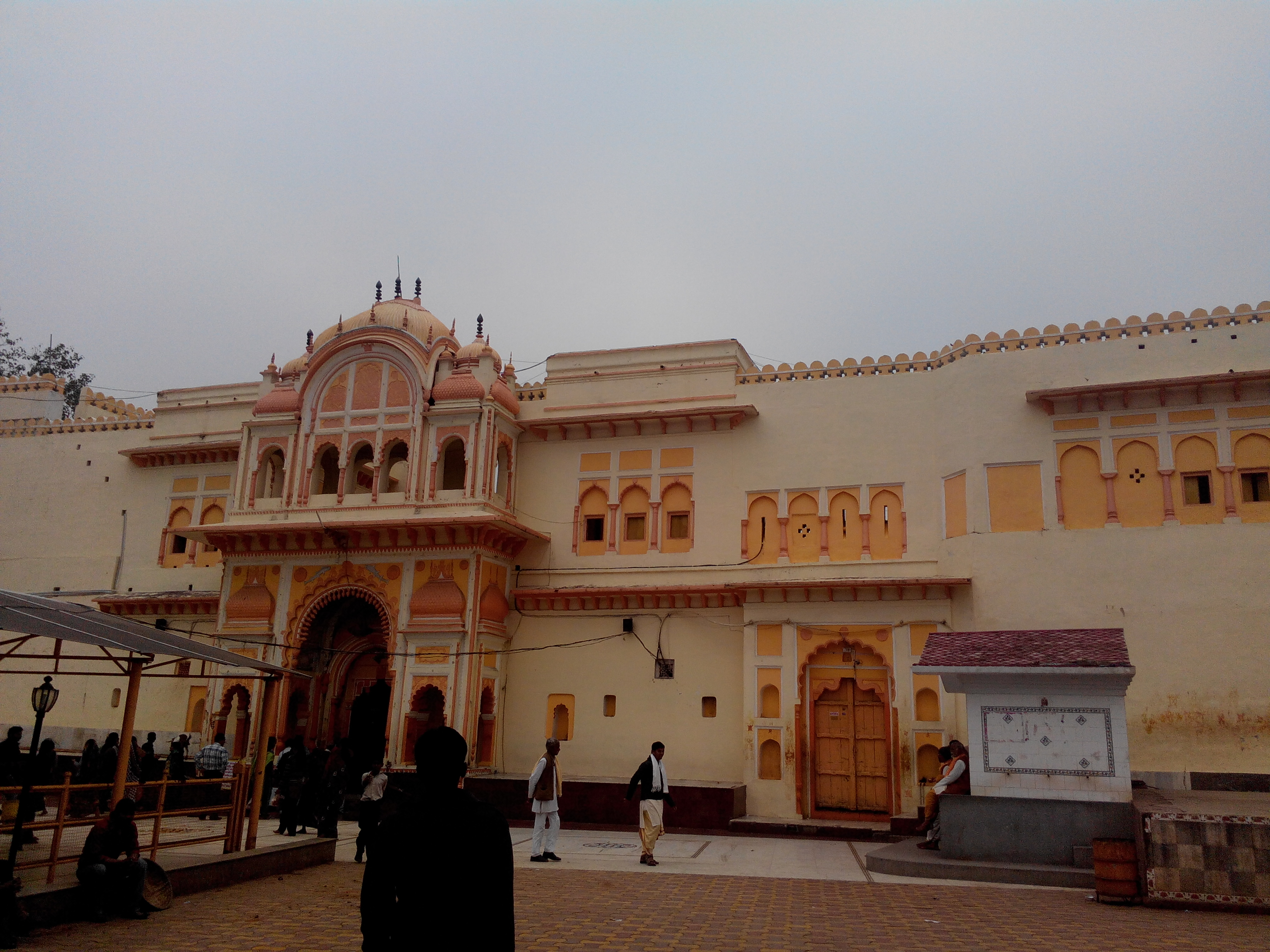
Ram Raja Temple

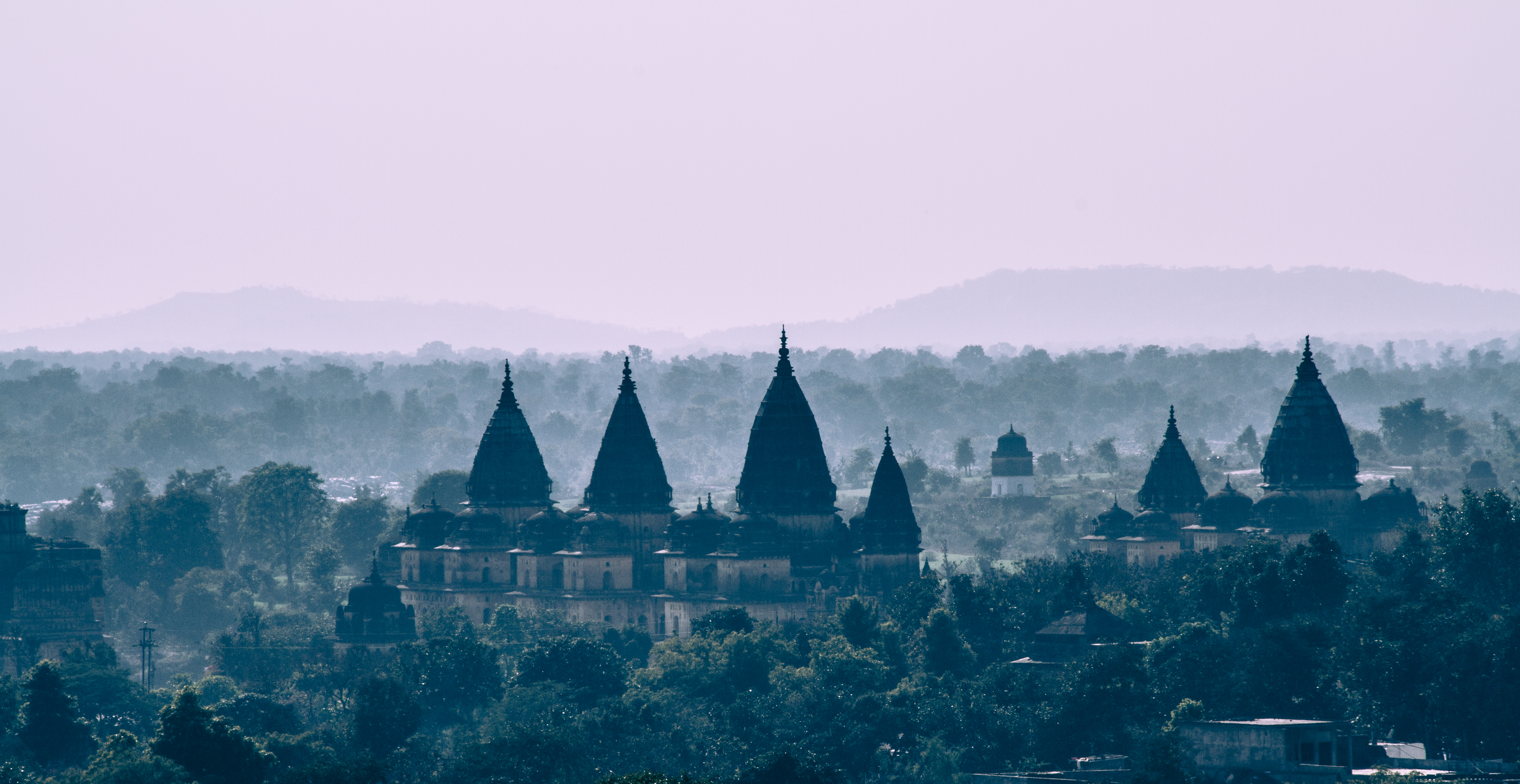
Royal Chhatris

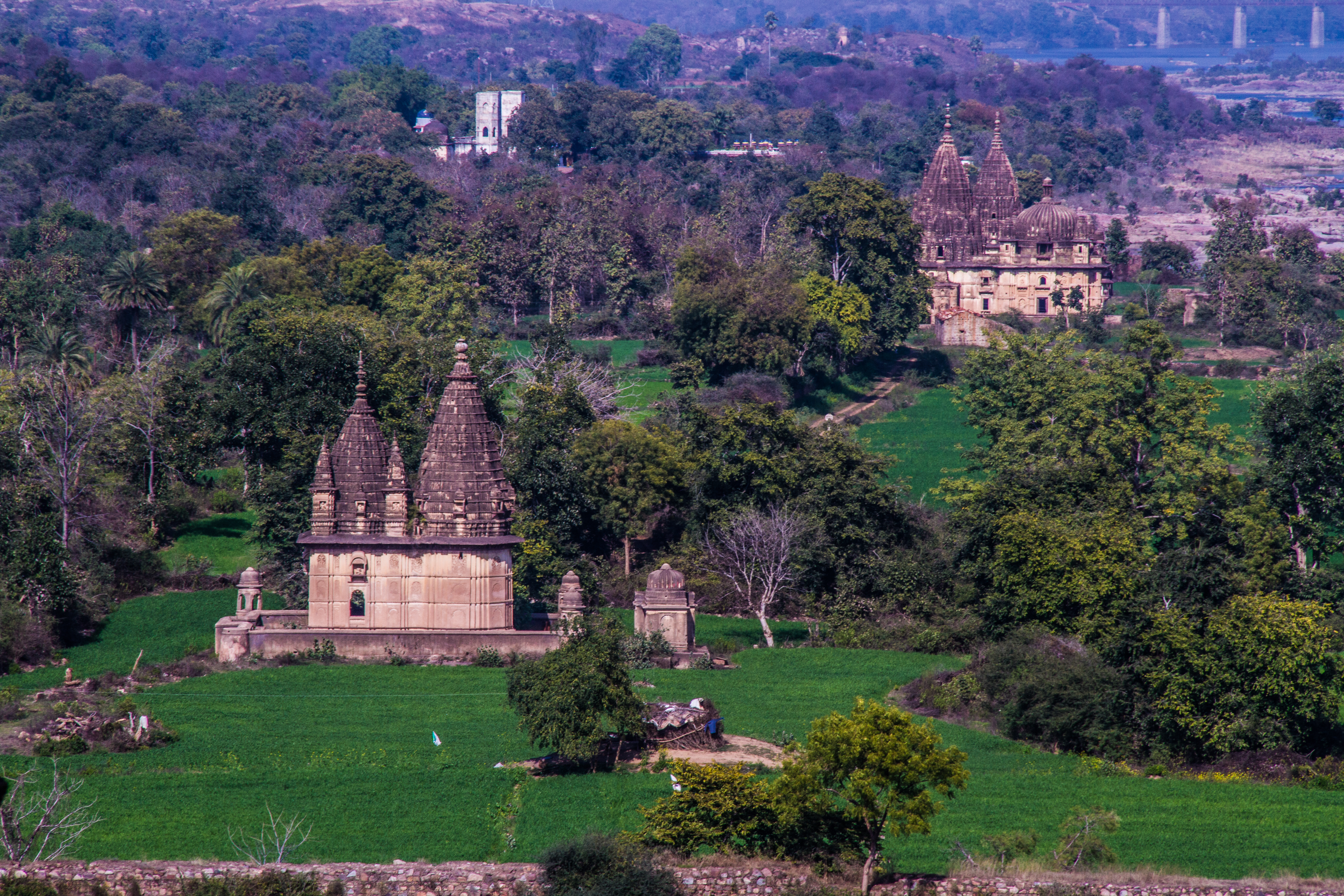
Purana Mandir

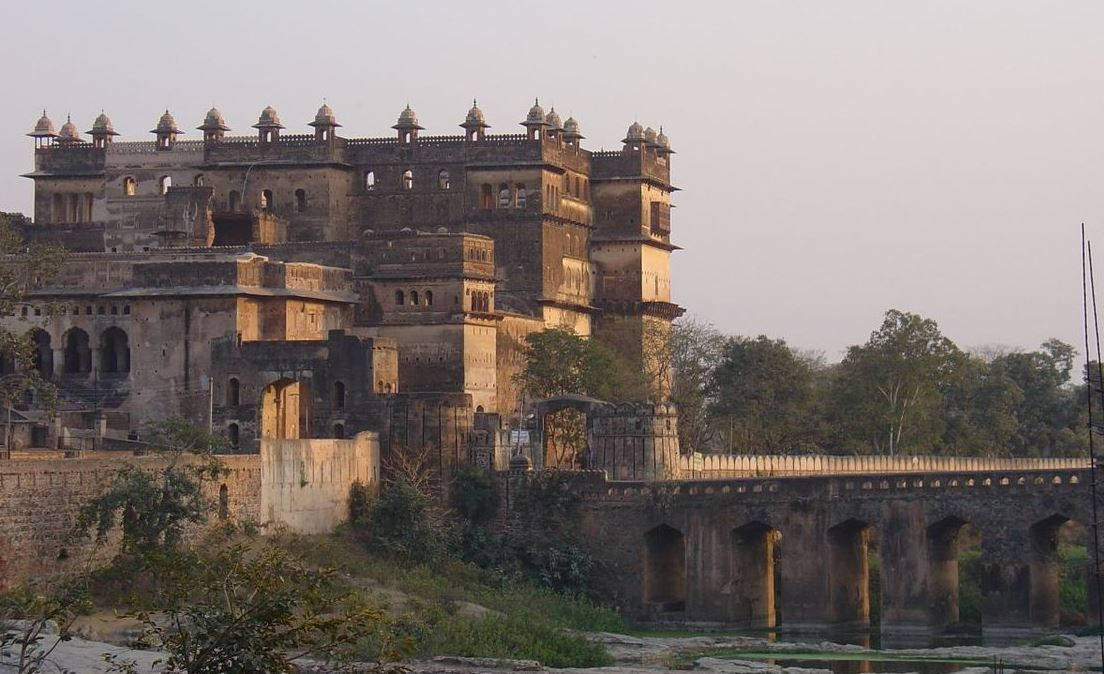
Orchha Fort complex

== Story about king Rama (Ram Raja) temple ==
Lord Rama is regarded as the King of Orchha. Other than Ayodhya, Orchha is the only place in India where lord Rama is the King of the town. The story behind this: in the 16th century, king Madhukar, shah of Orchha, was a devotee of Lord Krishna, whereas his wife queen Kunwar Ganesh was a devotee of Lord Rama. There were always disputes due to this difference. Once the king challenged the queen with this quest: if Rama really exists, then she should bring him to Orchha. The queen went to Ayodhya and prayed with rigorous penance to lord Rama. At last, Rama appeared before her in his juvenile form and agreed to go with her on three conditions: first, that he will be the only king of Orchha. Second, that he will remain there only forever and third, that he will go at a particular time, accompanied by monks. The queen accepted the conditions and thus Rama (statue representing Rama himself) was brought to Orchha. Since then Rama is the only king in Orchha. Even in contemporary times, Rama is regarded as the only king and the guard of honour is given to him by the armed guards of police every day at the Ram Raja Temple. No other VIP or minister or official behaves like a ruler when they visit Orchha. This aspect makes Orchha a unique place for devotees of Lord Rama.

== Places of tourist interest ==
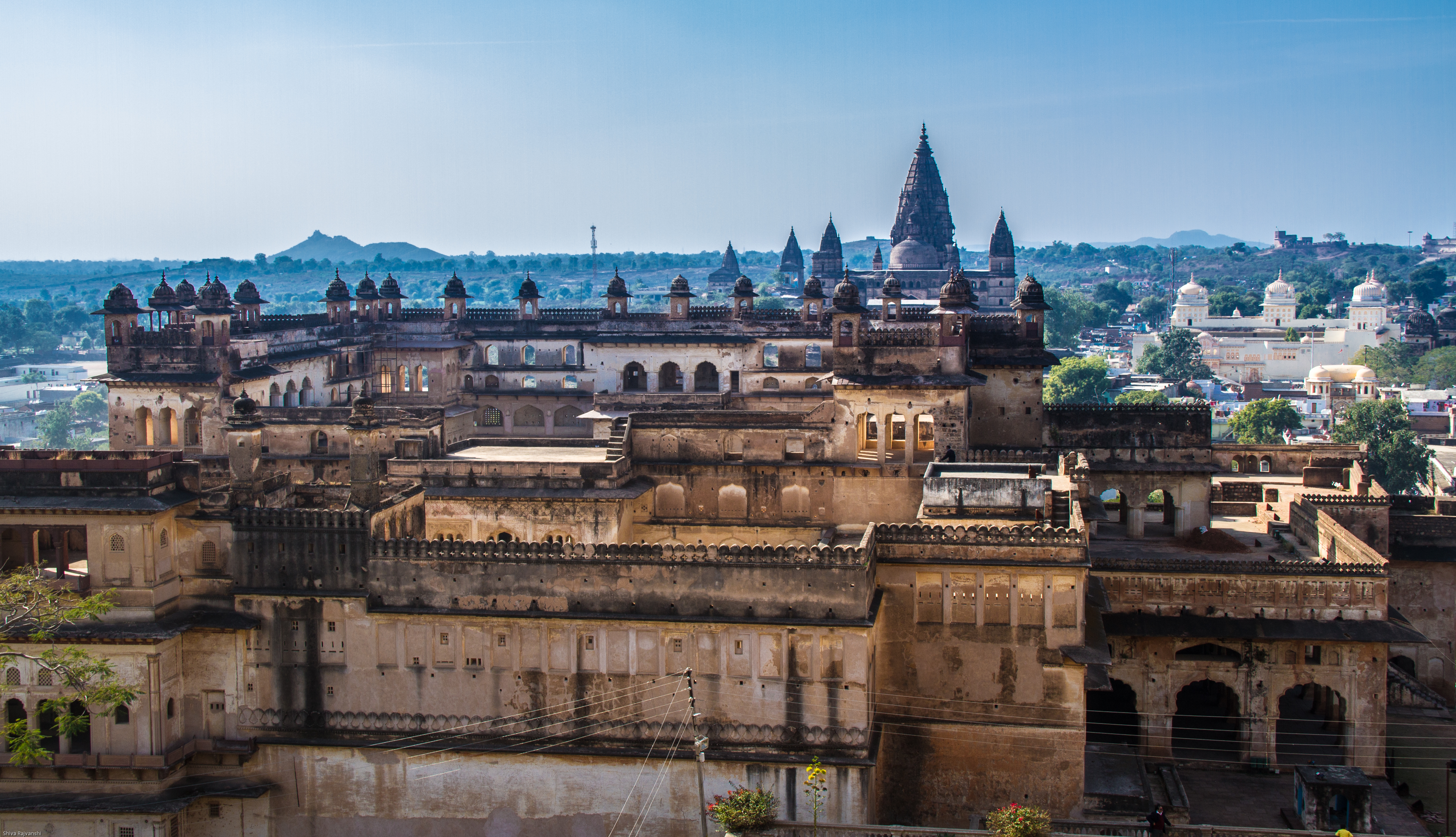
View of Raja Mahal from Jahangir Mahal with Ram Raja Temple and Chaturbhuj Temple in the background.

On a seasonal island on the bank of the Betwa River, which has been surrounded by a battlement wall, stands a huge palace-fort. The fort consists of several connected buildings erected at different times, the most noteworthy of which is the Raja Mahal.

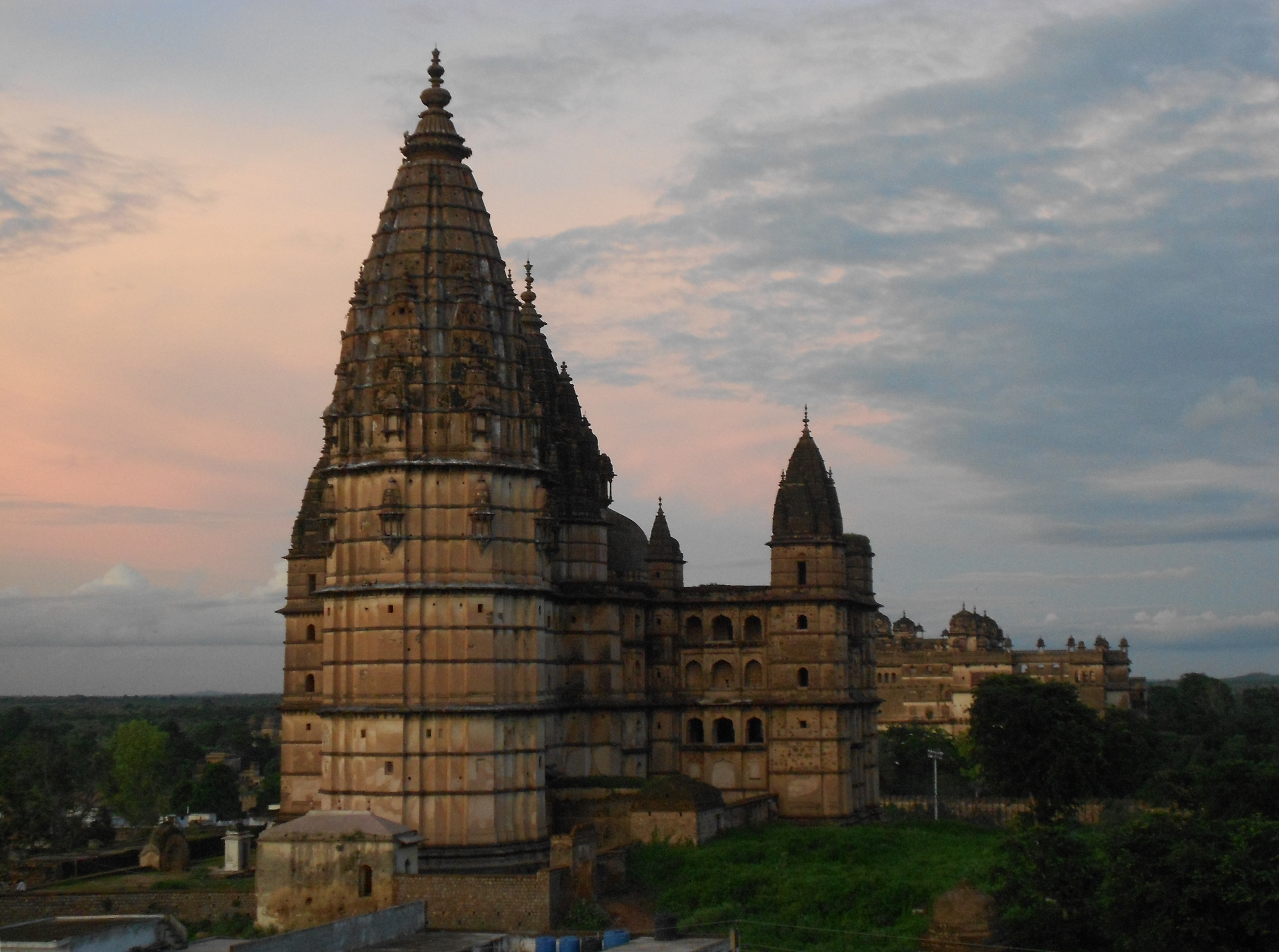
Chaturbhuj Temple at Orchha, is noted for having one of the tallest Vimana among Hindu temples standing at 344 feet.

The Ram Raja Temple is built on a square base and has an almost entirely plain exterior, relieved by projecting windows and a line of domes along the summit. The Jahangir Mahal is built on a rectangular base and is relieved by a circular tower at each corner surmounted by a dome, while two lines of delicate balconies supported on brackets mark the central storeys. The roof is crowned by eight large fluted domes, with smaller domes between them, connected by an ornamental balustrade.

The Jahangir Mahal is considered to be a singularly beautiful specimen of Mughal architecture. The Rajput king of Orchha had built the Jahangir Mahal with Mariam-uz-Zamani in mind.There is a spectacular light and sound show in the evening hours in the Jahangir Mahal. The show displays the history of the city of Orchha and the Jahangir Mahal. Chaturbhuj Temple is an old temple from the 9th century, and is noted for having one of the tallest Vimana among Hindu temples, standing at 344 feet.

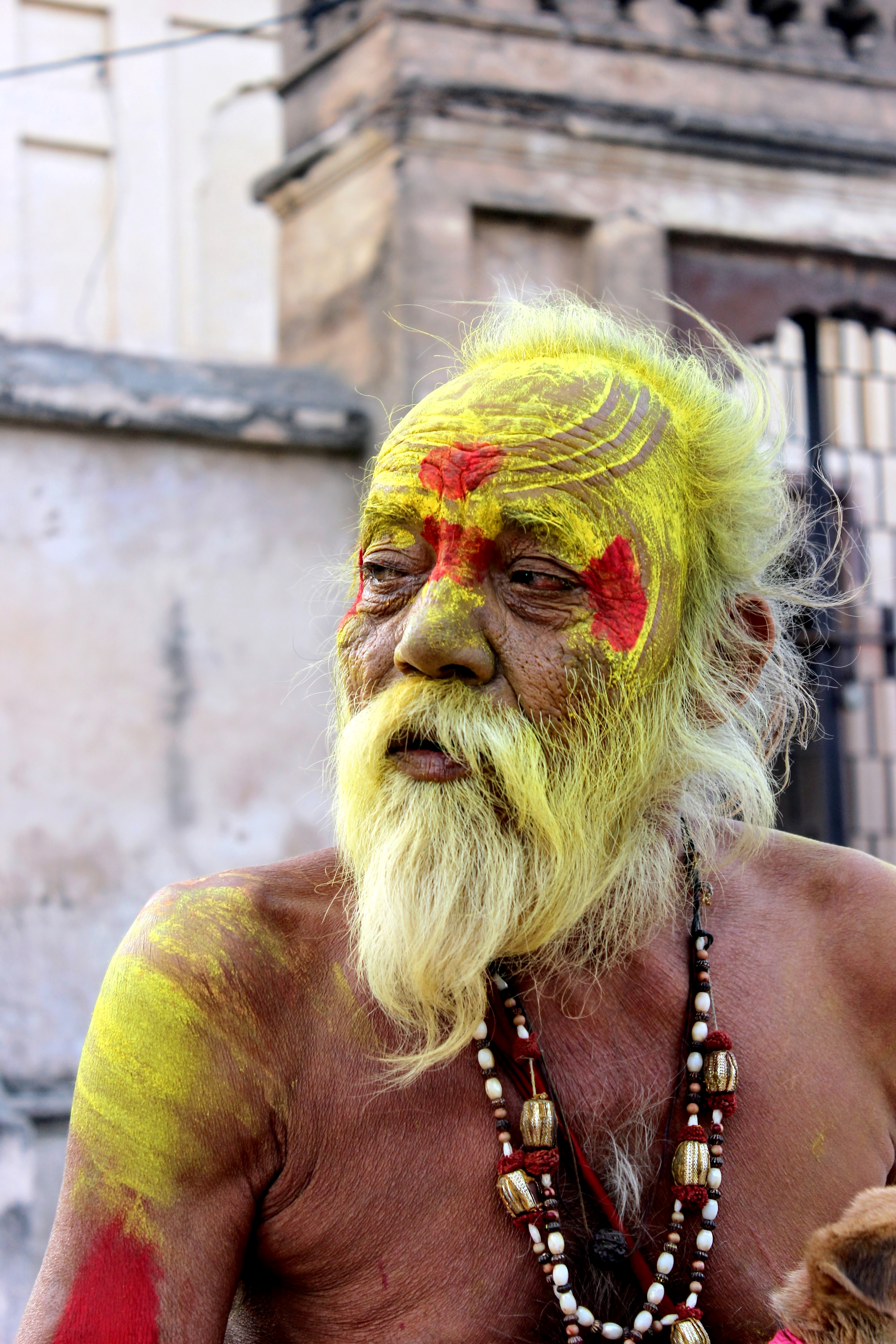
Sadhu of Orchha

The Uth Khana (Camel Shelter) where the King's camels were stationed is right next to the fort. Tourists can also climb on the roof of the Uth Khana to get a wide view of Orchha town. The ruins behind the fort complex houses the residences of various military officers, ministers (housing, roads), gunpowder factory, etc.

Numerous cenotaphs or chhatris dot the vicinity of the fort and the Betwa river. Elsewhere about the town there is an unusual variety of temples and tombs, including the Chaturbhuj temple, which is built on a vast platform of stone. The more unguarded and neglected of these buildings are popular hangouts for tropical bees, wasps, and other such excitable stinging creatures.

In 2006, Orchha's buildings were being documented by the LIK Team of IIT Roorkee, India.

A community radio station, Radio Bundelkhand was launched in Orchha on 23 October 2008 as an initiative of the Development Alternatives Group. The radio station broadcasts daily programs in the Bundeli dialect and devotes significant amount of its broadcast time to local issues, culture, education and the rich tradition of Bundeli folk music. The station is available on 90.4 MHz.

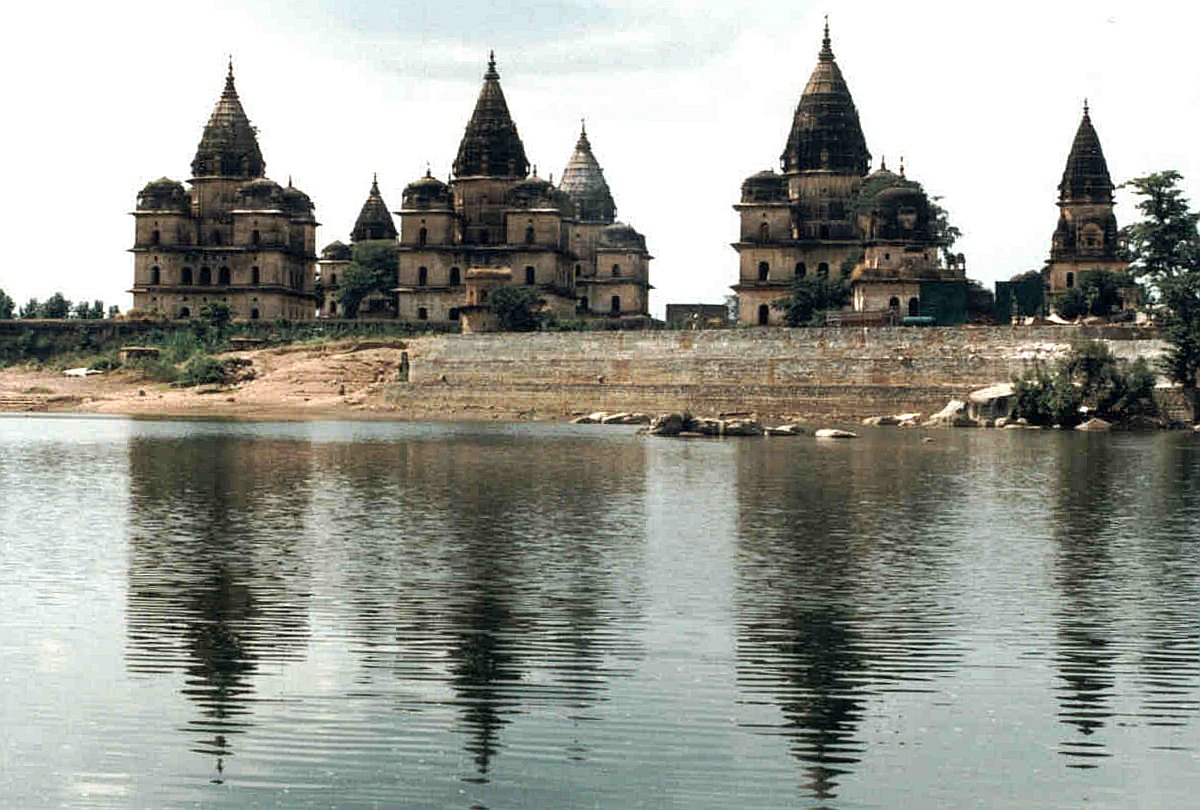
Chhatris on the bank of the Betwa River.

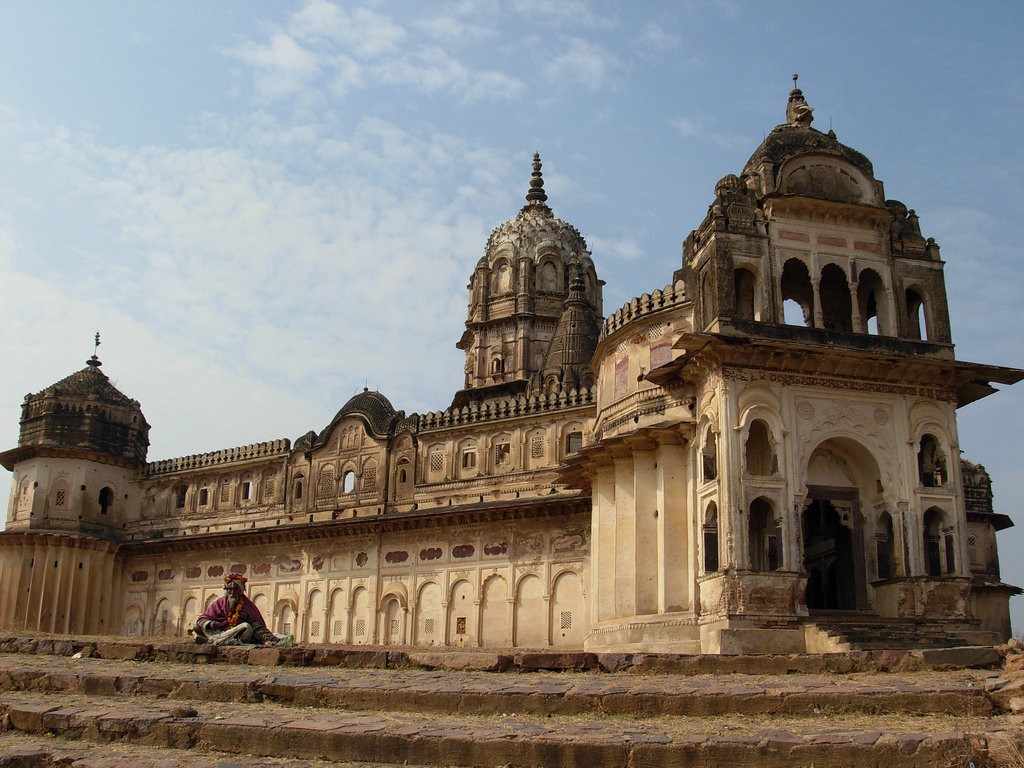
Lakshmi Temple, Orchha.

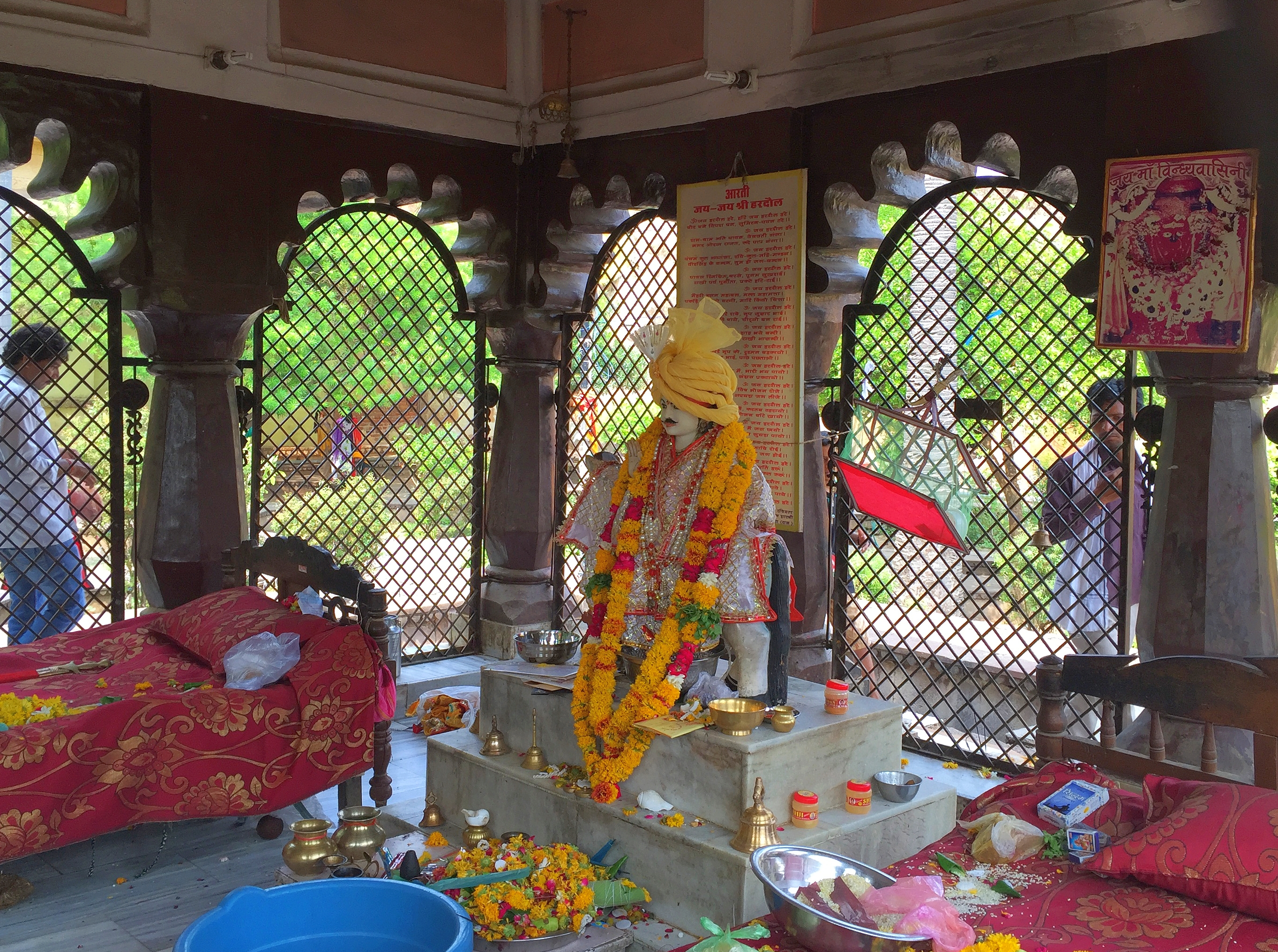
Hardaul ki Baithak Memorial at Orchha.

== Demographics ==
As of 2001 India census, Orchha had a population of 8501. Males constitute 53% of the population and females 47%. Orchha has an average literacy rate of 54%, lower than the national average of 59.5%: male literacy is 64%, and female literacy is 42%, 18% of the population is under 6 years of age.

== Literary Center ==
Orchha was the home of famous poet Keshavdas (1555–1617) who wrote the classic Rasikapriya.

== Popular in Media ==
In 2024, Anees Bazmee's film Bhool Bhulaiyaa 3 was shot at Orchha Fort, temples and ghats of Betwa. The film stars Kartik Aryan and Madhuri Dixit in the lead roles.

== Accessibility ==
The nearest Airport to Orchha is Rajmata Vijaya Raje Scindia Airport in Gwalior which is 119 km away. Orchha is 170 km and a 3-hour drive from Khajuraho Airport which is well connected with other metropolitan cities in India.

Orchha Railway station is on the Jhansi-Manikpur section of the North Central Railways. 15 km from Jhansi in Uttar Pradesh, Orchha also lies close to other popular tourist destinations such as Gwalior and Khajuraho.

== See also ==
- Orchha Fort complex

== Sources ==
- "Orchha Town". The Imperial Gazetteer of India, Vol. 19. Oxford at Clarendon Press. 1909. pp. 241–248.
