= Keshavdas =

Sanskrit scholar and Hindi poet (1555–1617)

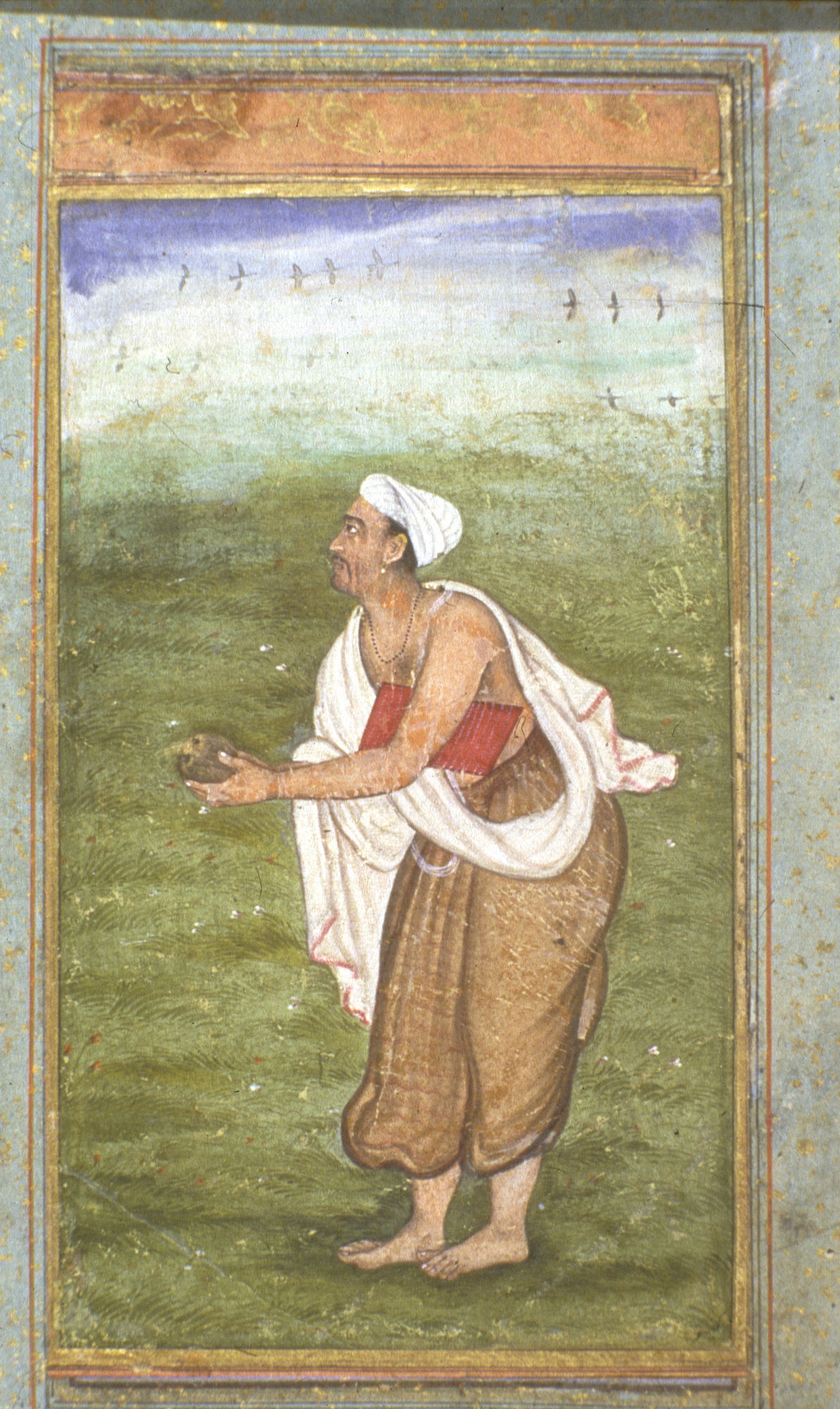
- Self Portrait of Keshav Das c.1570
- Born: Keshavdas Mishra c.1555 Orchha, Orchha Kingdom, Mughal Empire (modern-day Madhya Pradesh, India)
- Died: c.1617 (aged 61–62); Orchha, Orchha Kingdom, Mughal Empire
- Occupations: Poet, Writer, Scholar and administrator
- Writing career
- Genre: Epic Poetry

Keshavdas Mishra (1555–1617), usually known by the Keshavdas, was an Indian Poet, Writer, Scholar and administrator who was best known for his work Rasikpriya, a pioneering work of the Riti Kaal of Hindi literature. He was patronized by Vir Singh Deo of Orchha, a vassal of the Mughal Empire.

== Life ==
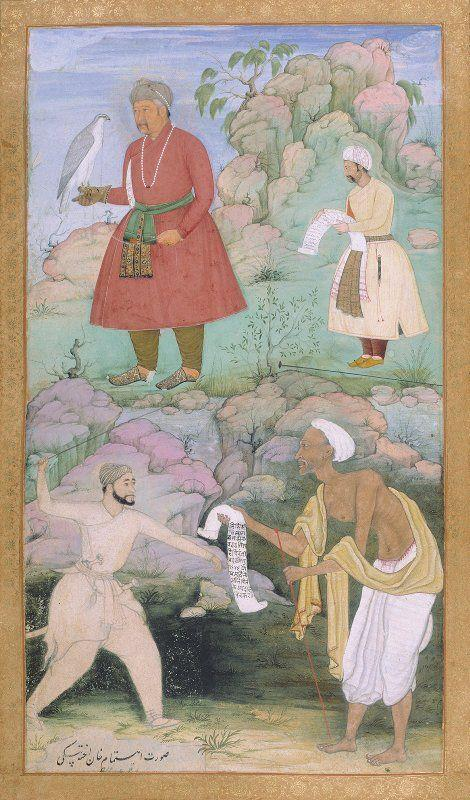
Painting of Akbar with falcon receiving Itimam Khan, while below a poor petitioner (self-portrait of the artist Keshavdas as an old man) is driven away by a royal guard, 1589

Keshavdas was a Sanadhya Brahman born in 1555 most likely near to Orchha at Tikamgarh. There were many pandits among his ancestors and inferences from his writings suggest that, as would be typical of a pandit, the preferred language of his family, and that to which he was exposed as a child, was Sanskrit. Those ancestors included Pt.Dinakara and Tribikrama, who had both been rewarded by Tomara rulers in Delhi and Gwalior, as well as his grandfather, Pt. Krishnadatta, and his father, Pt. Kashinatha, who had both served as scholars to the rulers of Orchha kingdom. (Note: Krishnadatta served in the court of Rudraputra, the founder of the Orchha kingdom, while Kashinatha was in the court of Madhukar Shah, the third ruler of the kingdom and a follower of the Bhakti movement.) His elder brother, Balabhadra, was also a poet.

Despite the familial connection to Sanskrit, Keshavdas adopted a vernacular style of Hindi, known as Braj Bhasha, for his writings. The self-deprecation that was consequent upon this momentous shift — he once described himself as a "slow-witted Hindi poet" (Note: Keshavdas was not always as self-deprecating as he was with his "slow-witted Hindi poet" remark. For example, he described himself as "wise" in the Virsinghdev Charit.) — belies his significance, described by Allison Brusch as "a decisive milestone in North Indian literary culture". His decision meant abandoning a highly formalised, stylised and accepted genre that was considered to be a de facto requirement of any poet, let alone one wishing to work within the royal courts of the time. It was not that Hindi poetry was new, since it had long been propagated, mostly orally and in particular by religious figures, but rather that it was deprecated. In particular, it was disliked by the pandits themselves. In the eyes of the critics, according to Busch, "To be a vernacular writer was to exhibit both a linguistic and an intellectual failing".

A large part of the success of Keshavdas can be attributed to the paradox that he used the Sanskrit tradition in his vernacular poetry. The literary status of Brij Bhasha was already becoming accepted among the common people in the generations immediately preceding him, in large part because of the Bhakti movement that sought to revitalise Vaishnavite Hinduism and which was centred on the towns of Vrindavan and Mathura. This movement of religious reclamation led to the building of many new temples and those who propagated and accepted Brij Bhasha at that time considered it to have been the language that was spoken by Krishna. Bhakti poets such as Swami Haridas produced new vernacular devotional works that abandoned Sanskrit, which had been the traditional language of religion and of the Brahmins, and their songs were sung communally rather than in isolation.

The rise to significance of Keshavdas was also influenced by the politics of the time. The Mughal Empire held sway in the area, with Orchha being a tributary state. The tributary rulers asserted their remaining power through cultural channels, and Keshavdas was associated with Orchha's court from the time of the reign of Madhukar Shah. Busch describes him as "a friend, advisor, and guru to the Orchha kings but ... also a consummate poet and intellectual".

Initially he was in the court of Indrajit Singh, the brother of the Bundela ruler Ram Singh. In 1608, when Vir Singh Deo came to power, Keshavdas joined his court. He was granted a jagir of 21 villages. Keshavdas died in 1617.

== Major works ==
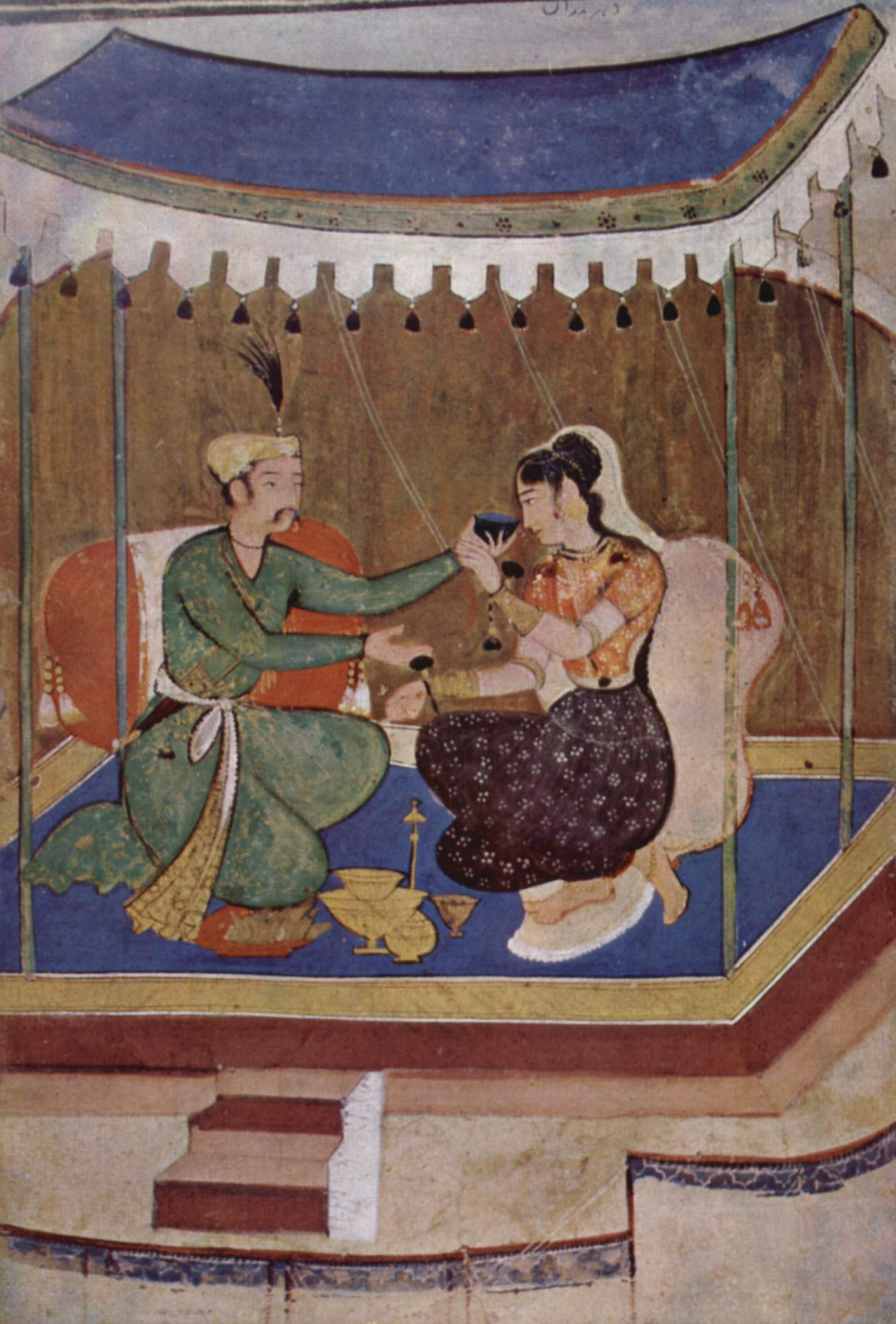
An illustration from Rasikpriya, 1610.

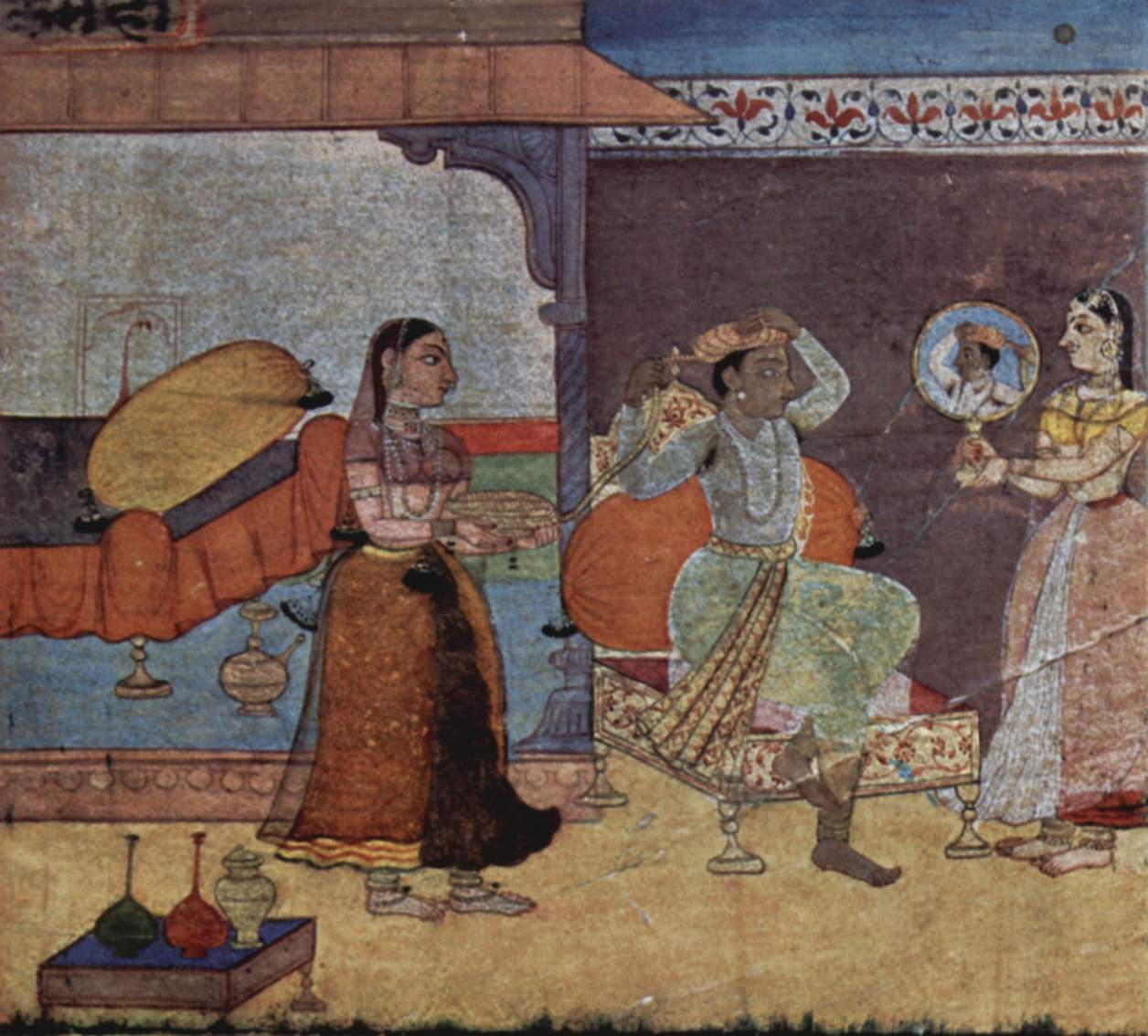
An illustration from Rasikapriya, 1610.

Ratan Bavani (ca. 1581) is the earliest work attributed to Keshavdas. Madhukar may well have commissioned it, although this is not certain. It stands out from all subsequent works of Keshavdas because of its compositional style and distinct anti-Mughal political stance. Busch says that it "must have had great resonance, and perhaps even provided some solace, for this newly defeated, and newly Vaishnavised, principality". The poem has 52 sextet verses that mix the raso style of western India with Vaishnavite influences, and reworks themes of classical Indian literature with a localised perspective. It depicts Vishnu as a supporter of Ratnasena Bundela, the fourth son of Madhukar, whose warrior exploits during the Mughal conquest of Orchha are glorified. The veracity of even the basic information presented is dubious — for example, it ignores that Ratnasena Bundela fought for Akbar as well as against him — but this appears likely to have been by design.

Three anthology of poems are attributed to him, Rasikpriya (1591), Ramchandrika (1600), and Kavipriya (1601). The Ramchandrika is an abridged translation of the Ramayana in 30 sections.

His other works include Rakhshikh (1600), Chhandamala (1602), Virsinghdev Charit (1607), Vijnangita (1610) and Jahangirjas Chandrika (1612).

=== Rasikpriya ===
He praised the Betwa and Orchha as the most beautiful things on earth and it was he who made them famous. Greyed by the years, he rued the day when pretty girls he encountered on the Betwa addressed him as Baba— an old man.

केशव केशन अस करी जस अरिहूं न कराहिं।
चंद्रवदन मृगलोचनी बाबा कहि कहि जाहिं॥

Keśav keśan as karī, jas arihūṇ na karāhiṇ,
caṇdravadan, mṛgalocanī, ‘Bābā’ kahi kahi jāhiṇ.

(O Keshav, what havoc thy grey hair has brought thee — may such a fate never befall even thy worst enemy — for their sake, moon-faced girls with the eyes of gazelles call thee baba.)

=== Virsinghdev Charit ===
Virsinghdev Charit was a hagiography of the Bundela king, Vir Singh Deo, who was his patron.
