= Vir Singh Deo =

17th-century Mughal Empire noble, ruler of Orchha

Raja Vir Singh Ju Deo
- Raja of Orchha
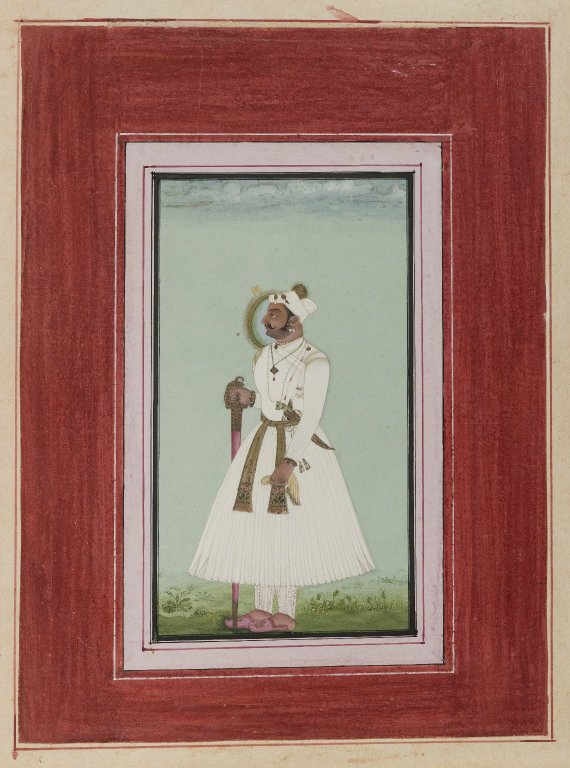
- Reign: 1605-1626/7
- Predecessor: Ram Shah
- Successor: Jhujhar Singh
- Spouse: Parmarji Amrit Kunwari of Shahbad Parmarji Guman Kunwari of Khairuwar Parmarji Pancham Kunwari of Shahbad
- Issue: Jhujhar Singh Pahad Singh Narhar Das Tulsi Das Beni Das Hardev (Hardaul) Bhagwan Rao Chandra Bhan Kishan Singh Bagh Raj Madho Singh Parmanand Kunj Kunwari
- House: Bundela Rajput
- Father: Madhukar Shah
- Mother: Parmarji Ganesh Kunwariji
- Religion: Hinduism

Raja Vir Singh Ju Deo, also known as Bir Singh Dev, was a Bundela Rajput chief and the ruler of the kingdom of Orchha in the historic Bundelkhand region of modern Madhya Pradesh. He was a vassal of the imperial Mughal Empire and ruled from 1605 until either 1626 or 1627.

Vir Singh Deo assassinated the Mughal chronicler and court historian Abul Fazl who was returning from Deccan in a plot contrived by the Mughal Prince Salim later Jahangir. He is also credited to have built the Jhansi Fort.

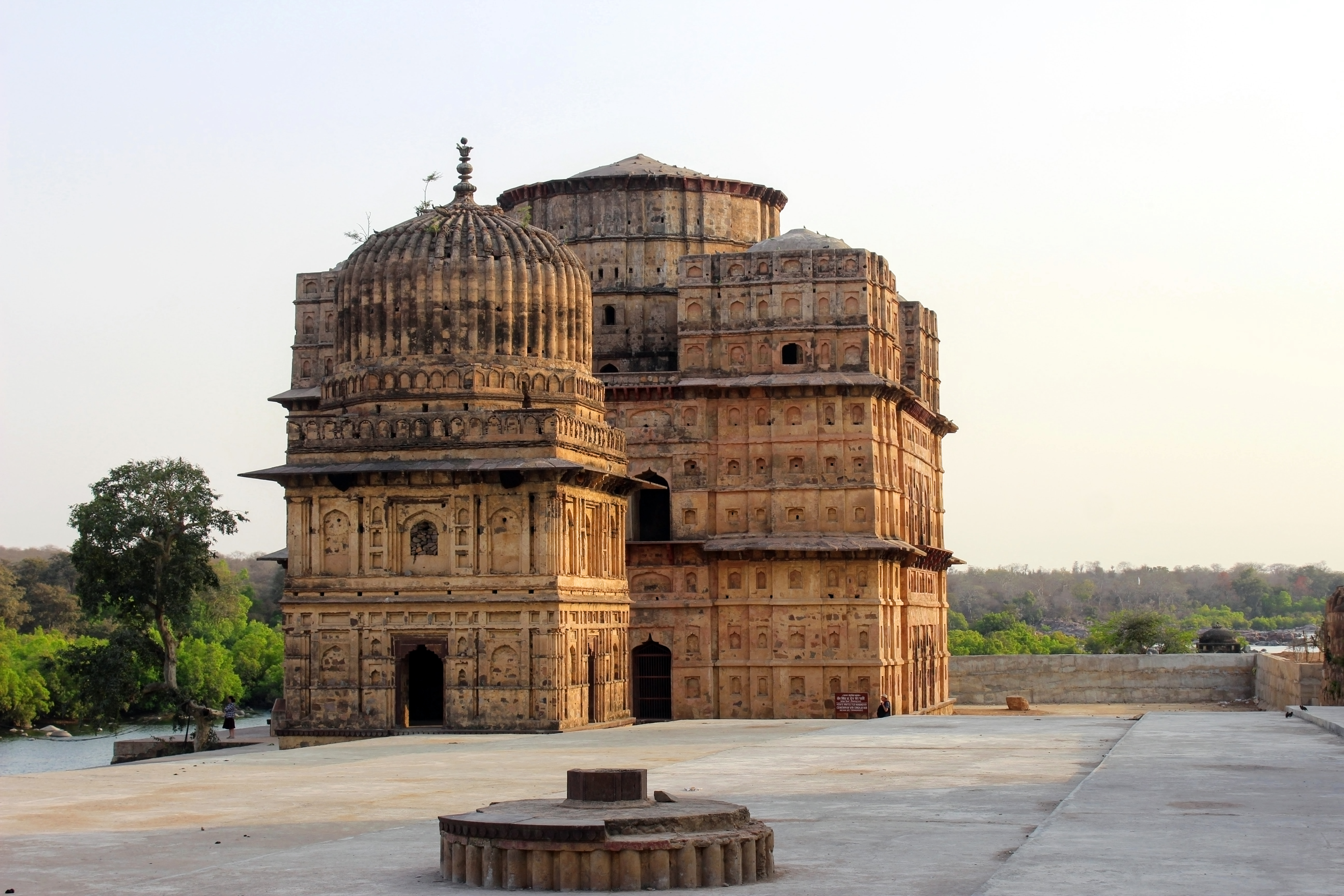
Vir Singh Deo ki Chhatri, Orchha

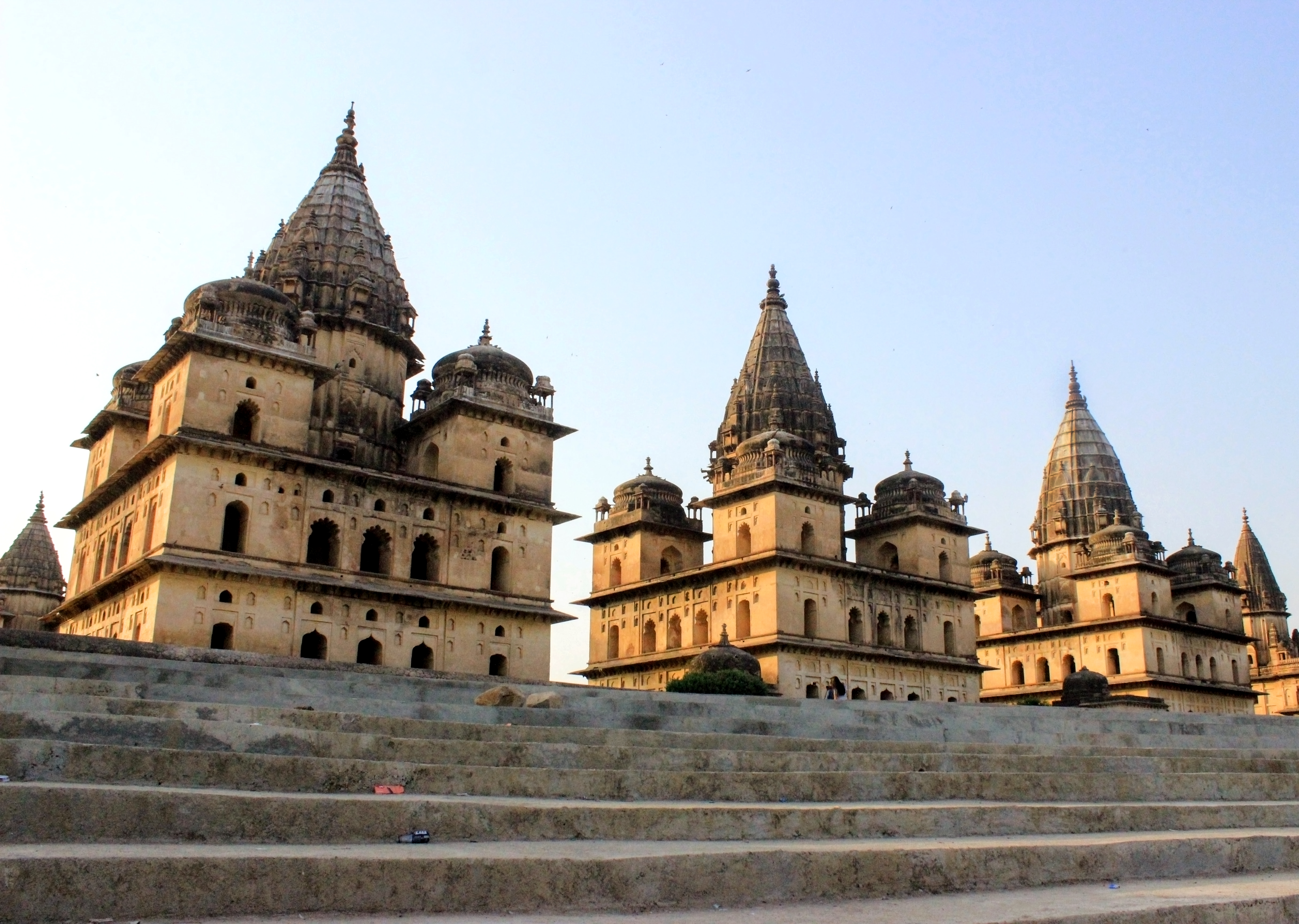
The Royal Chhatris of Orchha

Deo was among the Rajput rulers of his era who sponsored temples in the Brajmandal area that comprised Vrindavan and Mathura. In addition, the Phool Bagh gardens, and the Lakshmi temple were all built by Deo. His mausoleum is located in Orchha, and features both Hindu and Mughal architecture.

Vir Singh Deo was succeeded by Jhujhar Singh, the first-born son of the senior of his three queens.

Deo was patron to the poet Keshavdas, who wrote the 1607 hagiographic work Virsimdevcarit (Deeds of Vir Singh Deo).
