= Rajput architecture =

Overview of the architecture by the Rajput rulers of Rajasthan

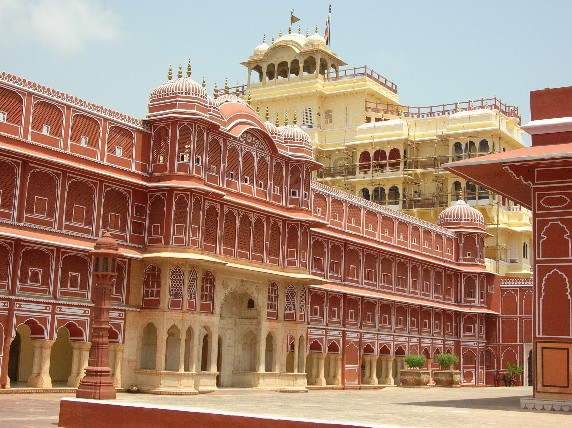
Chandramahal in City Palace, Jaipur, built by Jai Singh II

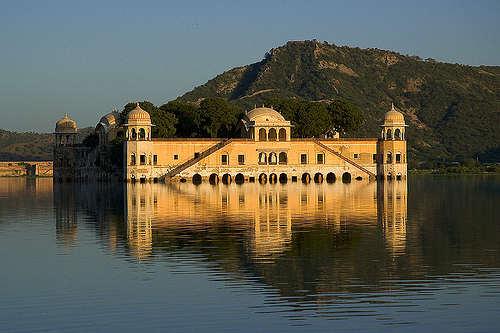
Jal Mahal, Jaipur

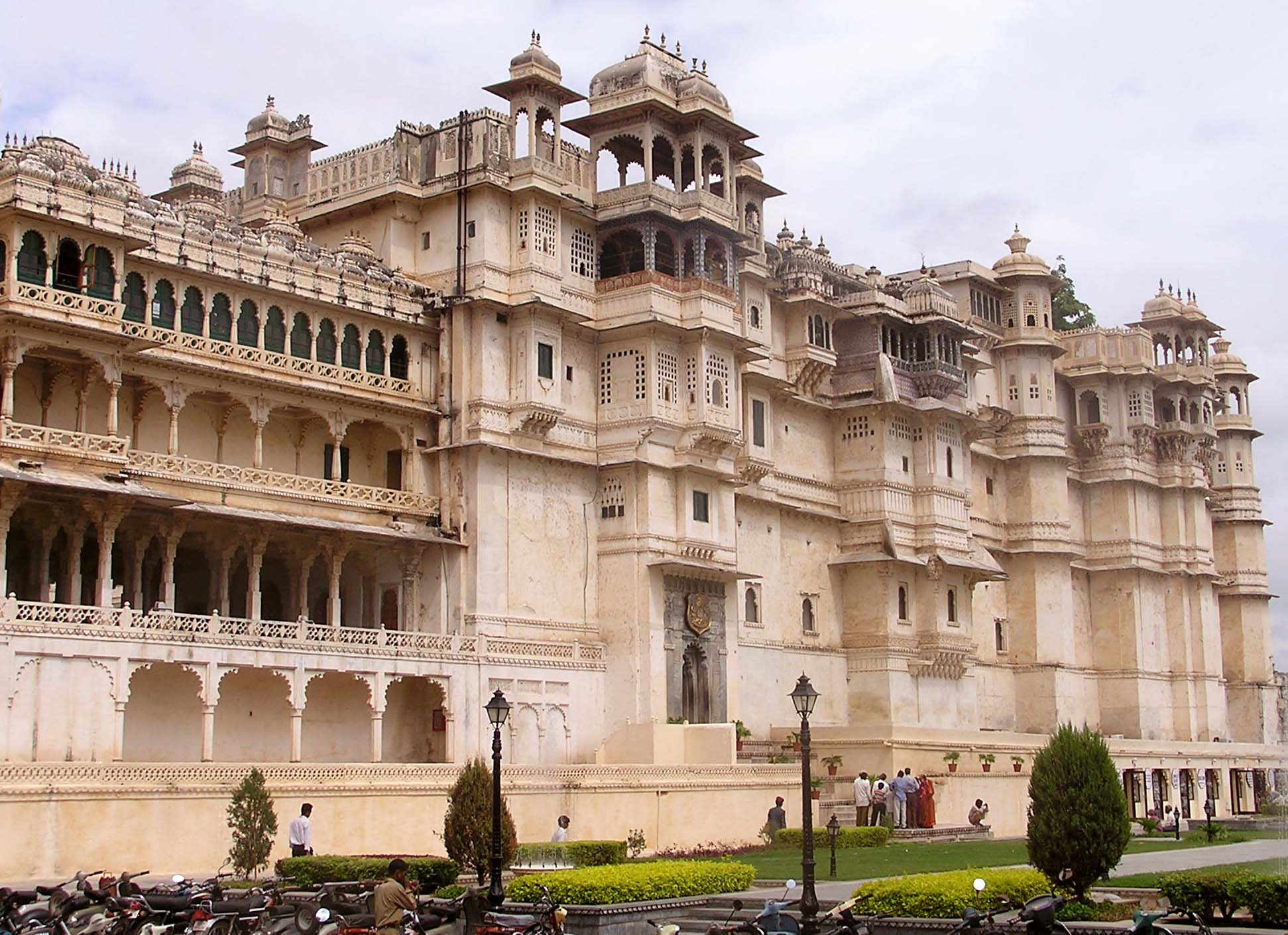
City Palace, Udaipur

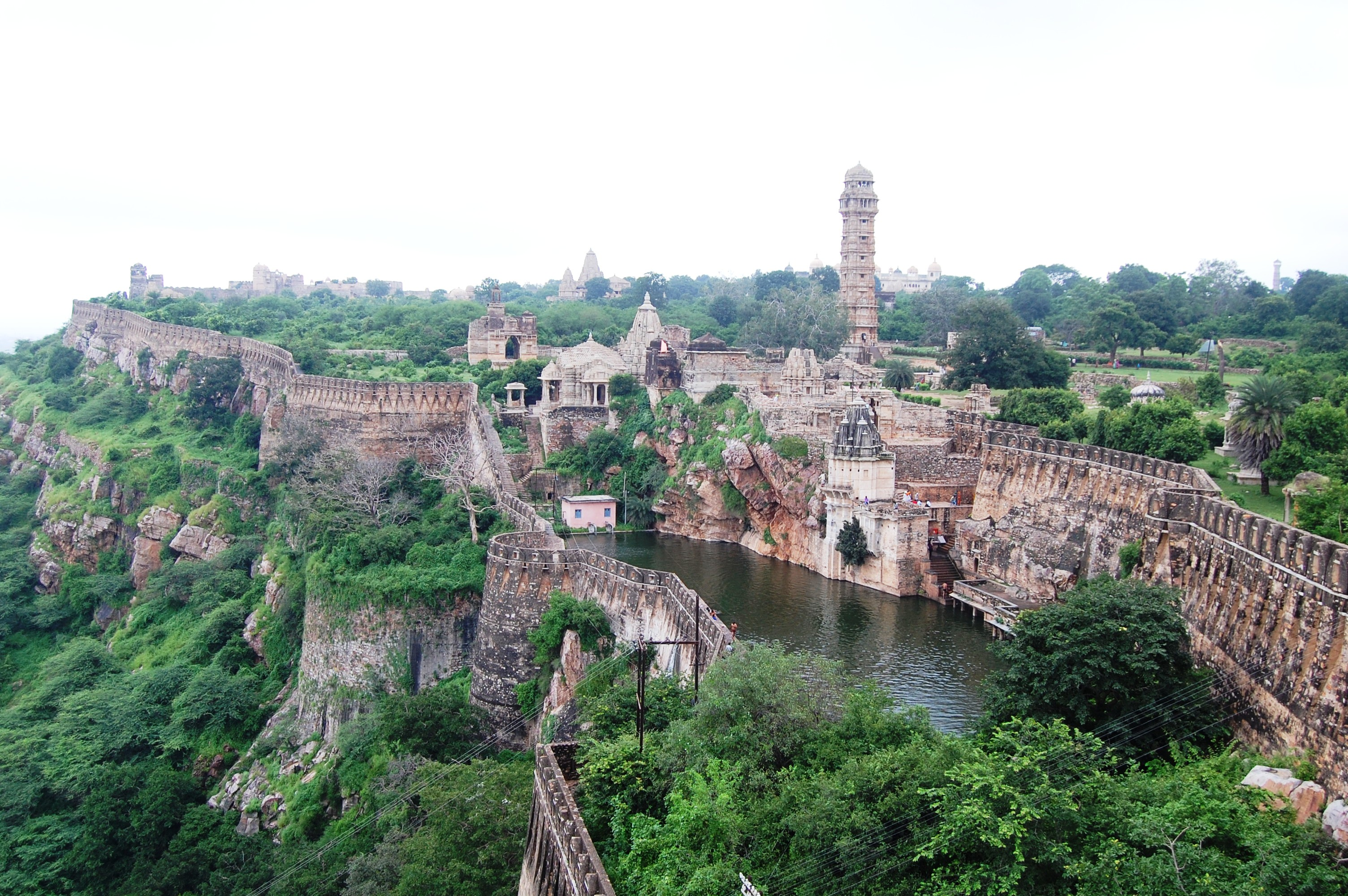
Chittor Fort

Rajput architecture is an architectural style associated with the forts and palaces of the many Rajput rulers. Many of the Rajput forts are UNESCO World Heritage Sites and popular tourist attractions.

Rajput architecture represents different types of buildings, which may broadly be classed either as religious or military. These include temples, forts, stepwells, gardens, and palaces. The forts were specially built for defense and military purposes. The Mughal and European architecture influenced indigenous Rajput styles of art and architecture.

Rajput architecture continued well into the 20th and 21st centuries, as the rulers of the princely states of British India commissioned vast palaces and other buildings, such as the Albert Hall Museum, Lalgarh Palace, and Umaid Bhawan Palace. These usually incorporated European styles as well, a practice which eventually led to the Indo-Saracenic style.

The Hill Forts of Rajasthan (Amer, Chittor, Gagron, Jaisalmer, Kumbhalgarh, Ranthambore), a group of six forts built by various Rajput kingdoms and principalities during the medieval period, are among the best examples of Rajput architecture. The ensemble is also a UNESCO World Heritage Site. Other forts include the Mehrangarh Fort and Jaigarh Fort.

== Rajasthan ==
=== Forts, Palaces and Temples ===
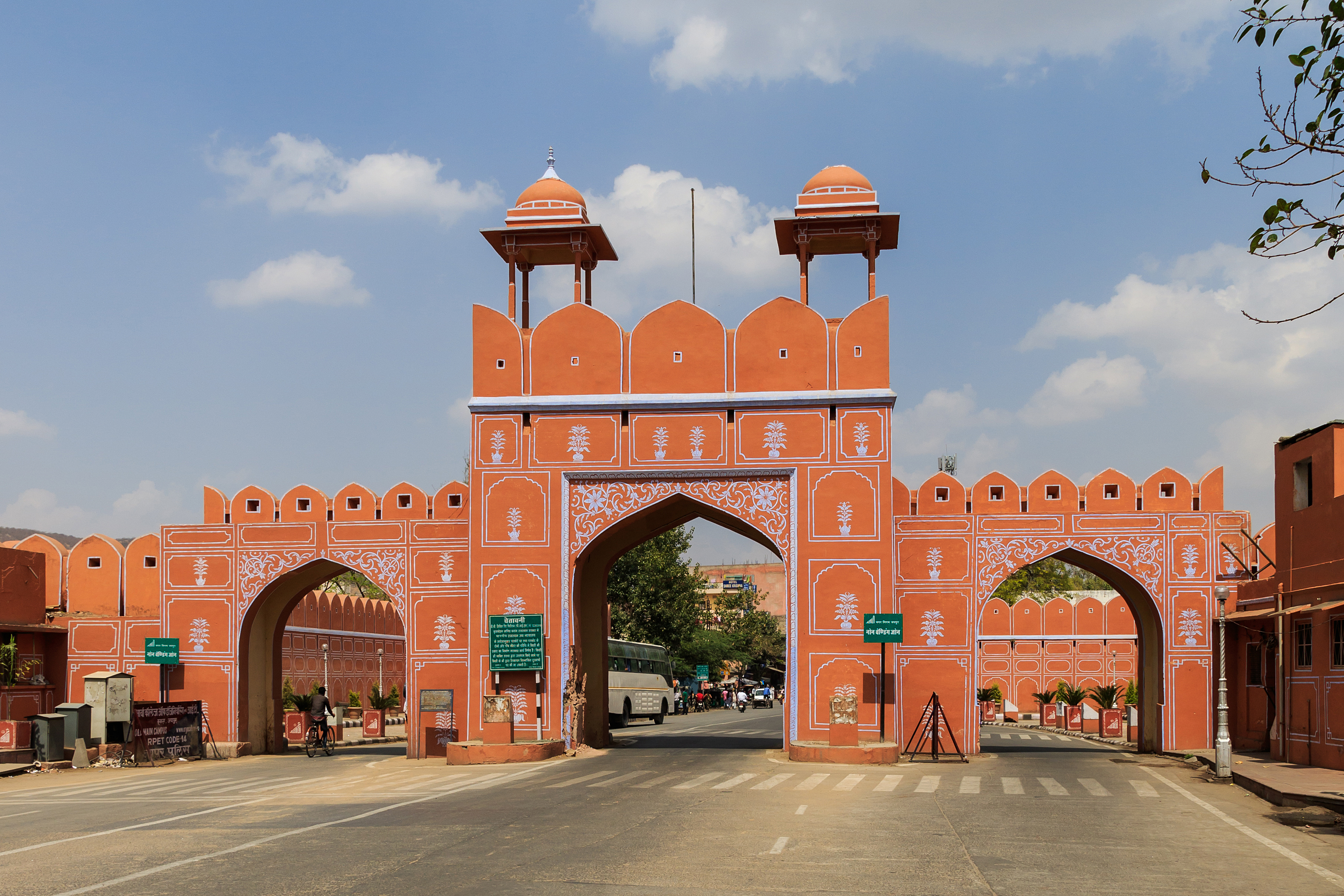
Zorawar Singh Gate of City wall of Jaipur

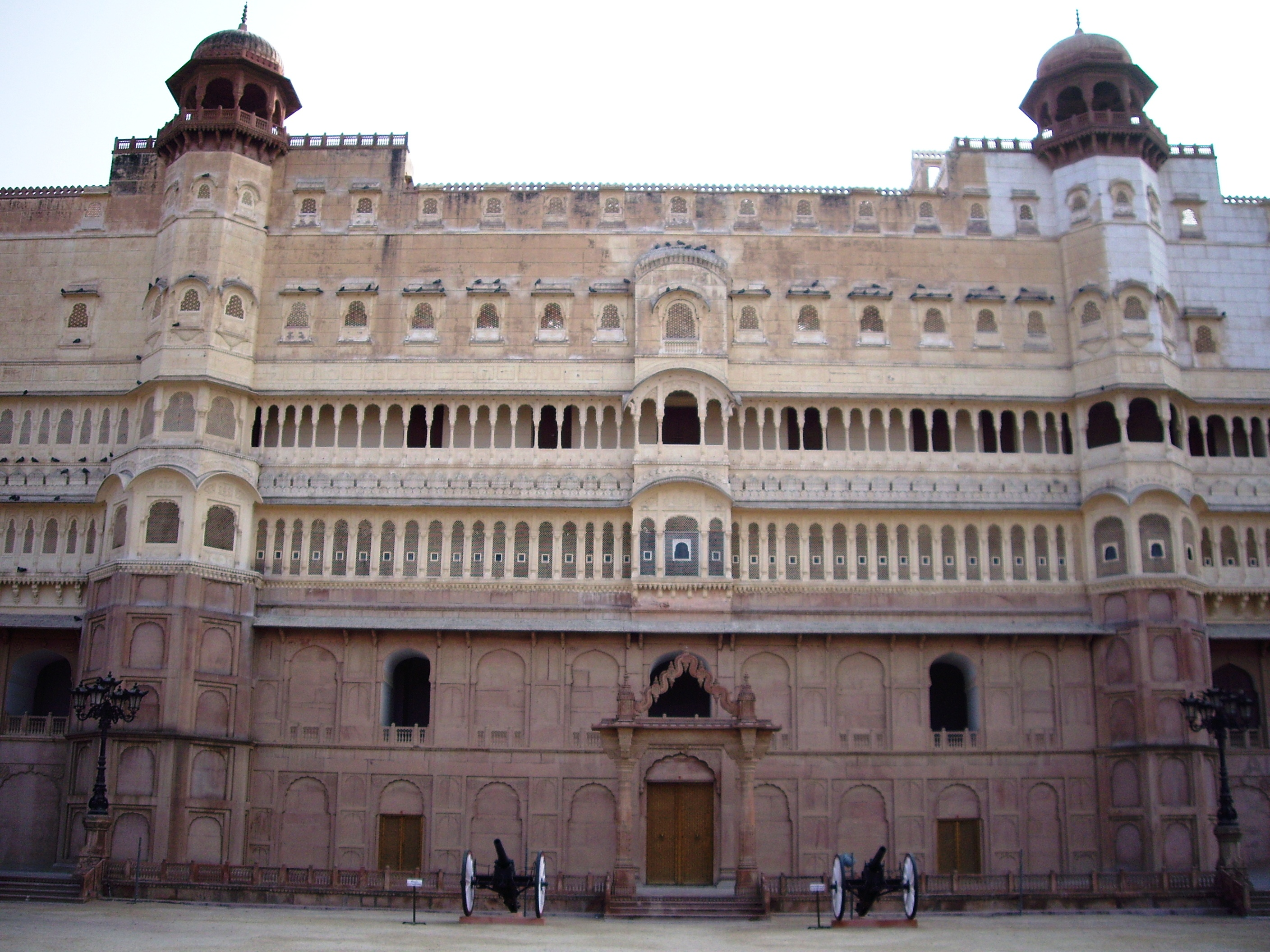
Entrance eastern façade of the Junagarh Fort, Bikaner

The Hill Forts of Rajasthan (Amer, Chittor, Gagron, Jaisalmer, Kumbhalgarh, Ranthambore), a group of six forts built by various Rajput kingdoms and principalities during the medieval period are among the best examples of Rajput Architecture. The ensemble is also a UNESCO World Heritage Site. Other forts include the Mehrangarh Fort and Jaigarh Fort.

The walled city of Jaipur was formed in 1727 by Kacchwaha Rajput ruler Jai Singh II, and is "a unique example of traditional Hindu town planning", following the precepts set out in much Hindu texts. Subsequently, the City Palace, Hawa Mahal, Rambagh Palace, Jal Mahal and Albert Hall Museum were also built. Udaipur also has several palaces, including the Bagore-ki-Haveli, now a museum, built by an 18th-century chief minister.

The rulers of the princely states of Rajputana continued the tradition of building elaborate palaces almost until independence, with examples such as the Lalgarh Palace in Bikaner, Monsoon Palace in Udaipur, and Umaid Bhawan Palace in Jodhpur. Many of these are in versions of Indo-Saracenic architecture, often using European architects.

=== Cenotaphs ===
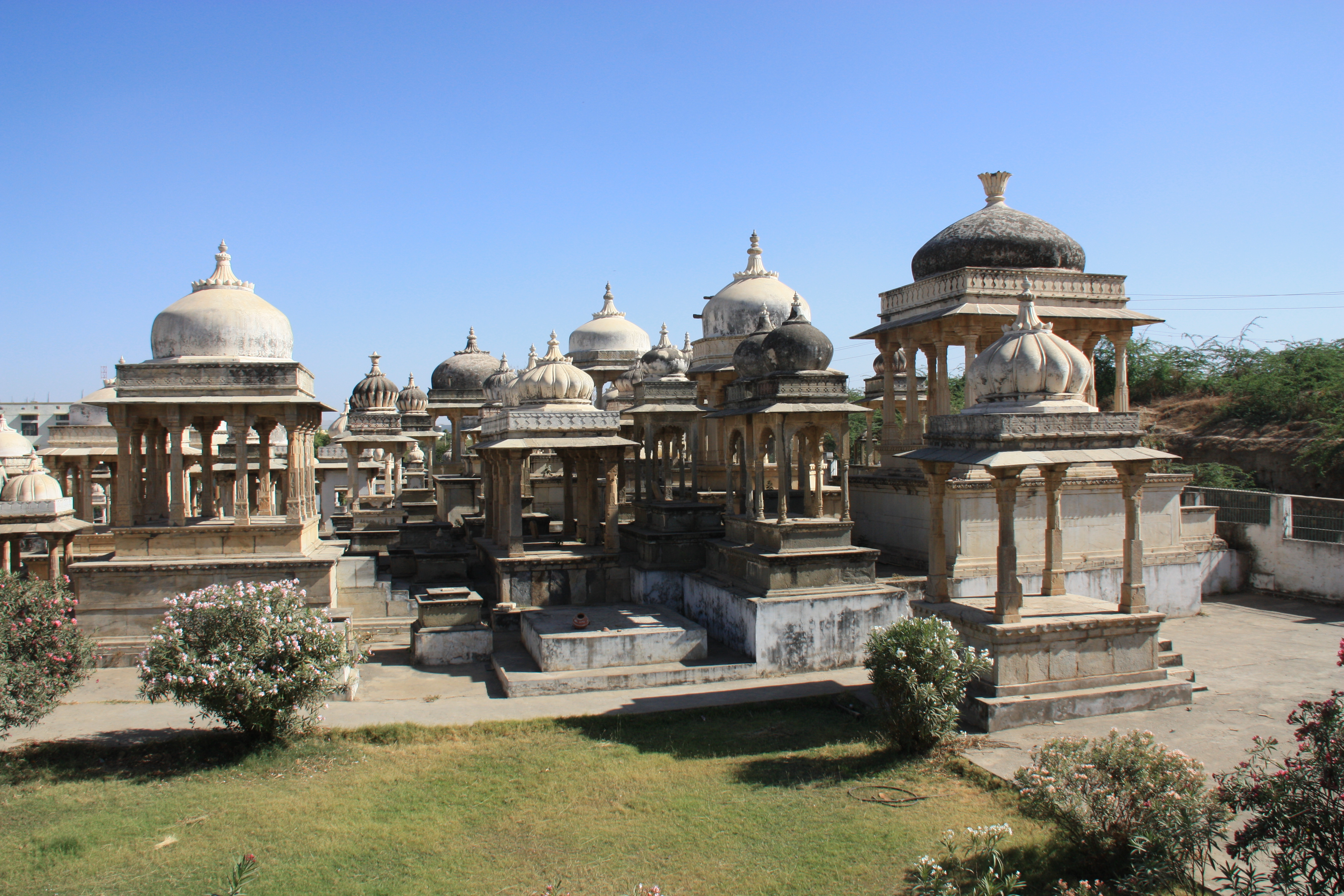
Some of the Ahar Cenotaphs outside Udaipur

A number of the Rajput dynasties built groups of cenotaph memorials for their members, mostly using the chatri form, and often at the traditional site for cremations. These include the Ahar Cenotaphs outside Udaipur, and Bada Bagh near Jaisalmer. Individual examples include the Jaswant Thada at Jodphur, and Chaurasi Khambon ki Chhatri, Bundi; there are many others.

== Gujarat ==
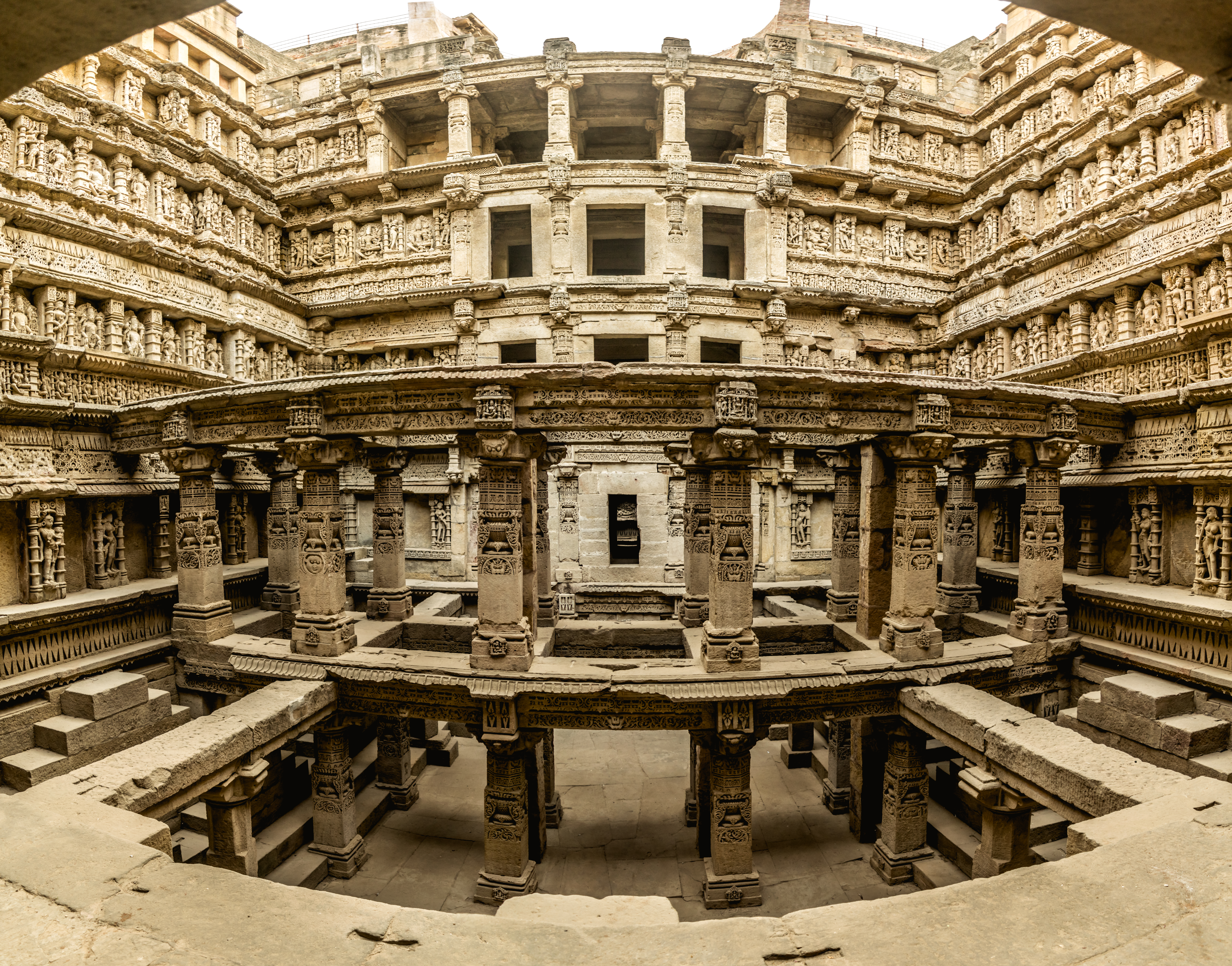
Rani ki vav, Patan, Gujarat, 11th century

Māru-Gurjara architecture, or Solaṅkī style, is a distinctive style that began in Rajputana and neighbouring Gujarat around the 11th century by the Solanki Rajputs. Examples of Solanki Rajput architecture include Taranga Jain temple, Rudra Mahalaya Temple, and Modhera Sun Temple. The Dilwara Jain Temples of Mount Abu built between the 11th and 13th centuries CE, The Rani ki vav was also built during this period.

The small but richly carved Hindu Ambika Mata temple in Jagat, built before 960, and The five Kiradu temples, of the 11th or 12th century, are examples of the Pratihar Rajput style. The Jagdish Temple, Udaipur (completed 1651), is an example of a Hindu temple using the Māru-Gurjara style at a late date; in this case a commission of Jagat Singh I, ruler of Mewar. On the exteriors, this style is distinguished from other north Indian temple styles of the period

that the external walls of the temples have been structured by increasing numbers of projections and recesses, accommodating sharply carved statues in niches. These are normally positioned in superimposed registers, above the lower bands of moldings. The latter display continuous lines of horse riders, elephants, and kīrttimukhas. Hardly any segment of the surface is left unadorned.

The main shikhara tower usually has many urushringa subsidiary spirelets on it, and two smaller side-entrances with porches are common in larger temples.

== Madhya Pradesh ==
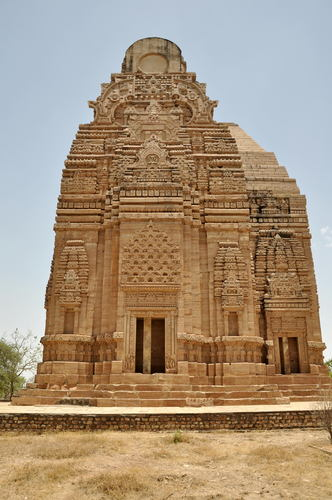
Teli ka Mandir was built inside the Gwalior Fort by the Pratihara Rajput ruler Mihira Bhoja

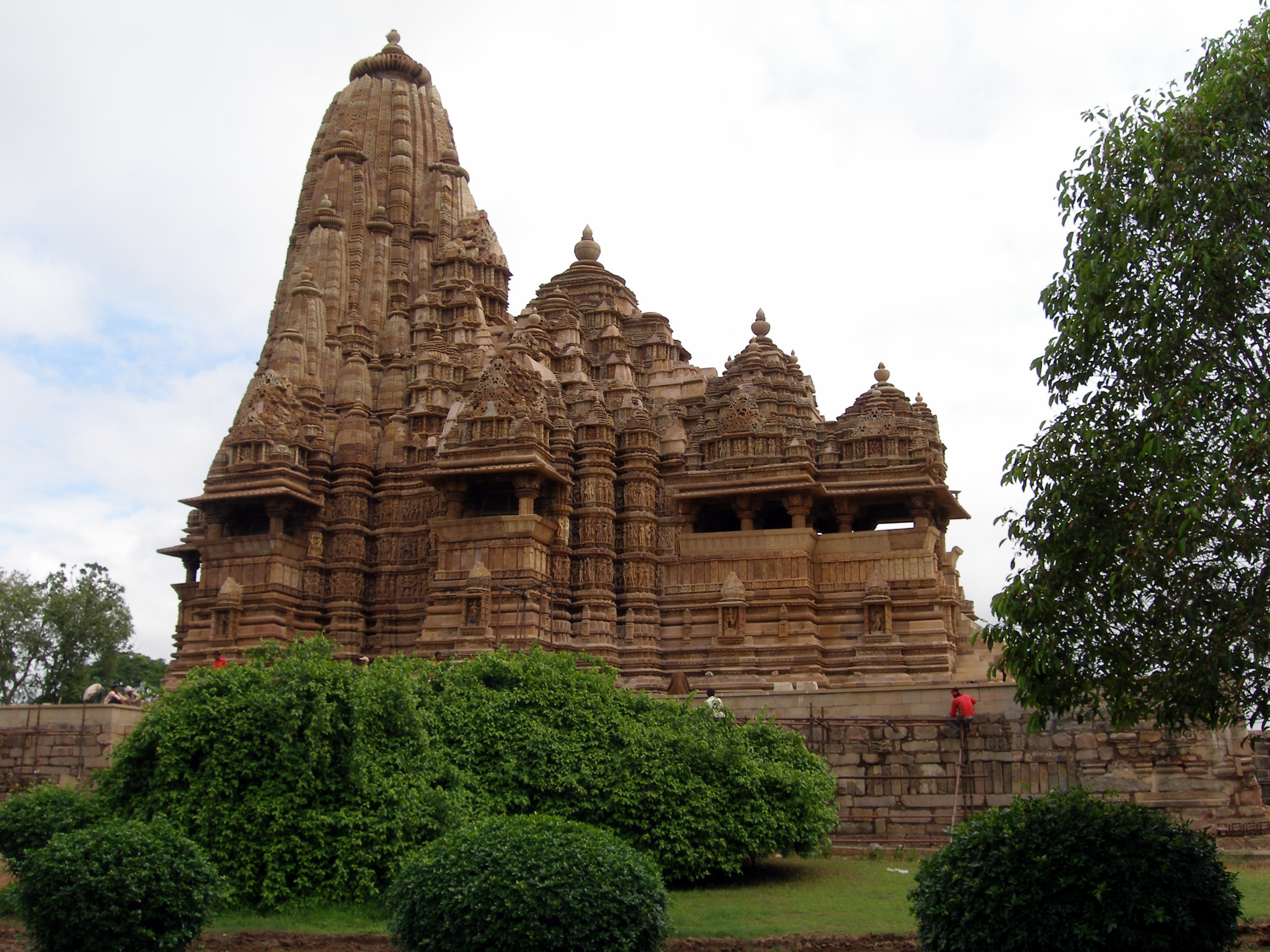
Khajuraho Group of Monuments were built by Chandela Rajputs

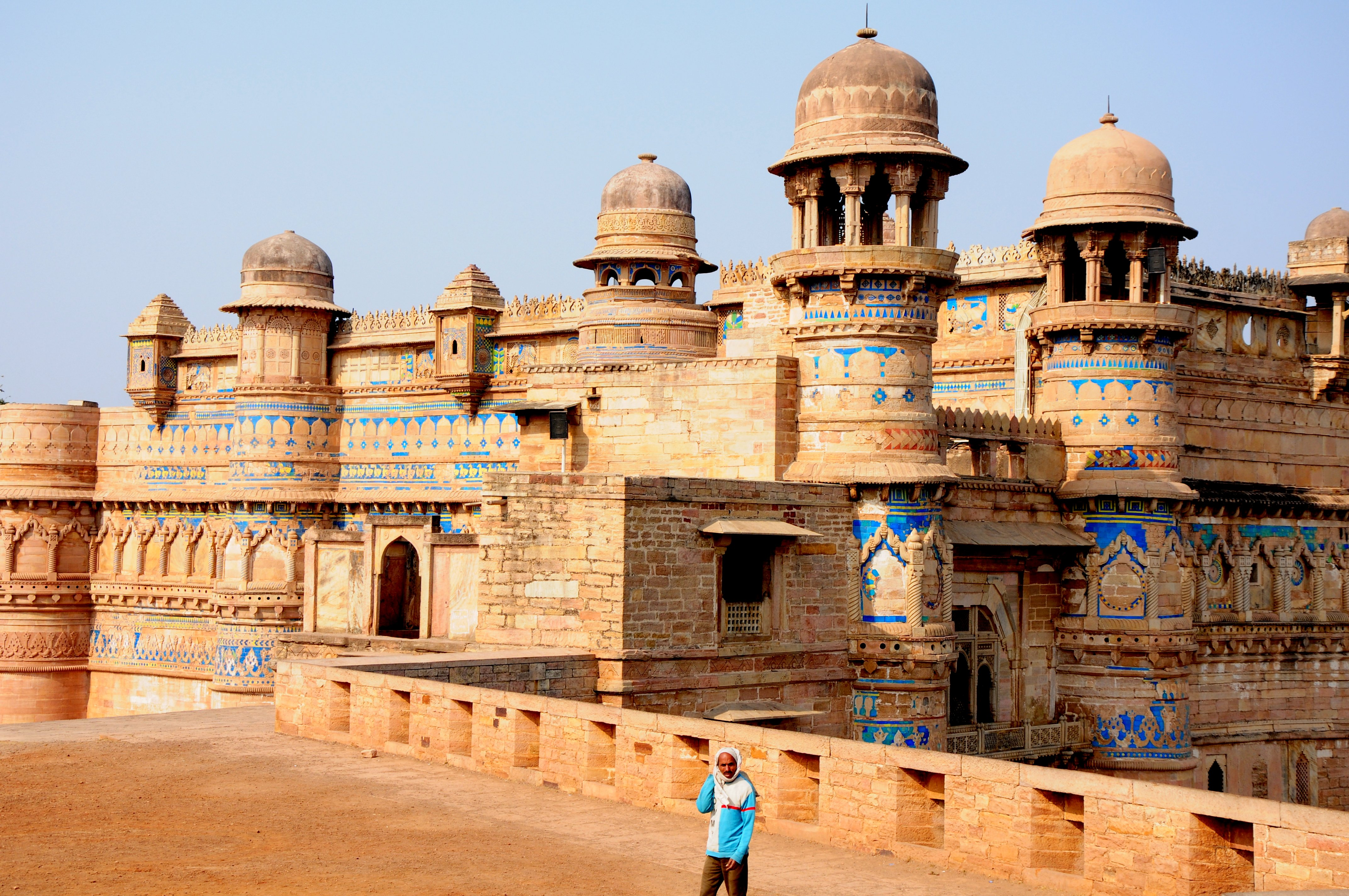
Gwalior Fort

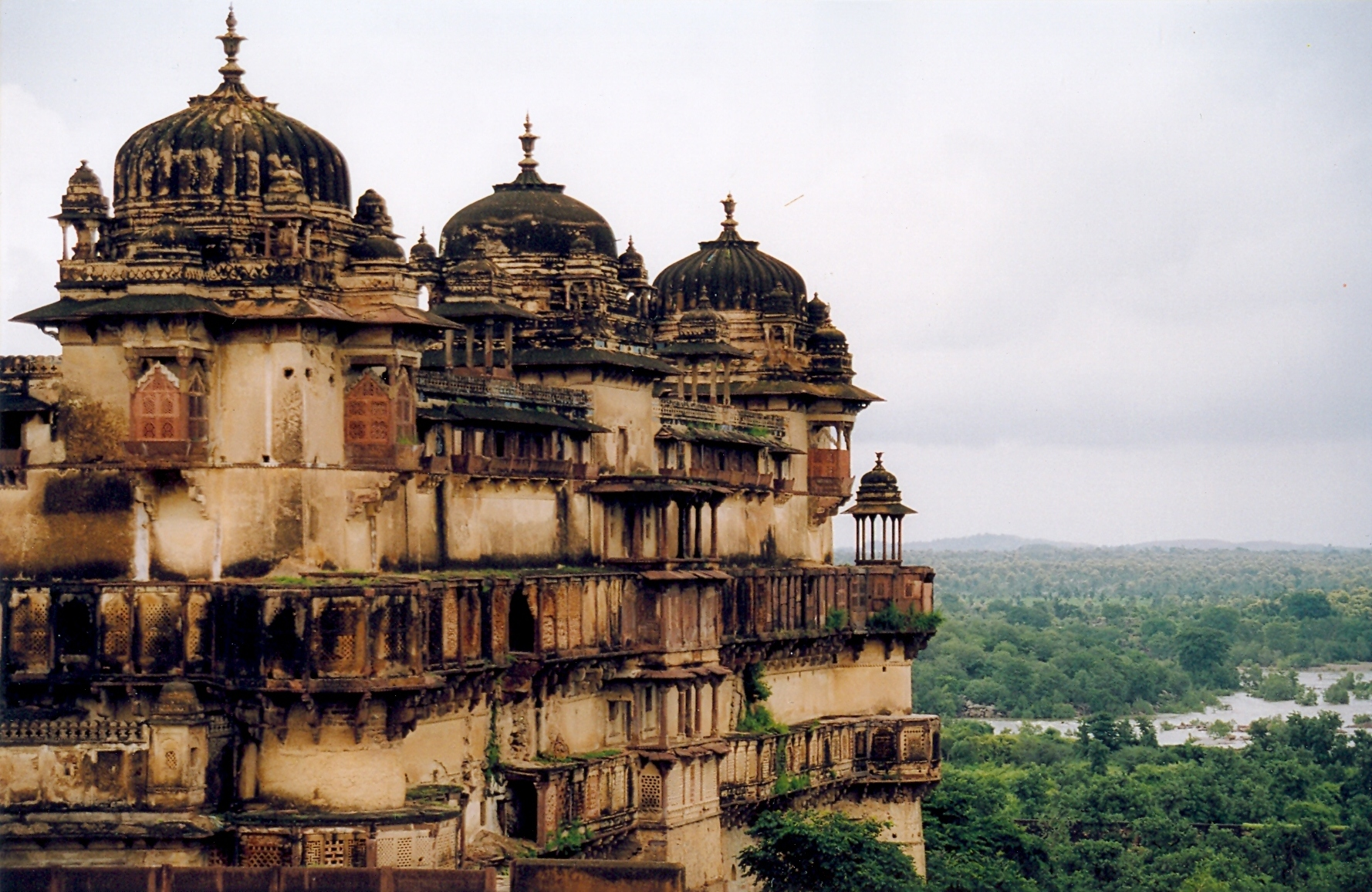
Jahangir Mahal was built by Vir Singh Deo as a symbol of welcome to the Mughal emperor Jahangir

Sailana Palace, built by the Rathores of Malwa

The Khajuraho Group of Monuments were built by the Chandela Rajput rulers from 885 AD to 1050 AD.

The Gwalior Fort is a hill fort near Gwalior. The fort has existed at least since the 10th century, and the inscriptions and monuments found within what is now the fort campus indicate that it may have existed as early as the beginning of the 6th century. The fort is considered among the finest of Rajput architecture. Most part of the present day fort was built by Man Singh Tomar, the Rajput king who ruled the region from 1486 to 1516.

The Orchha state was founded in 1531 (the 16th century AD) by the Bundela Rajput chief, Rudra Pratap Singh, who became the first King of Orchha, (r. 1501-1531) and also built the Fort of Orchha. The Chaturbhuj Temple was built during the reign of Mughal emperor Akbar, by the queen of Orchha, Ganesh Kunwar, while Raj Mandir was built by 'Raja Madhukar Shah' during his reign, 1554 to 1591. The Jahangir Mahal was built in 17th century by Vir Singh Deo as a symbol of welcome to the Mughal emperor Jahangir.

The Singorgarh fort was built by Raja Belo from the Chandela dynasty of Mahoba.

== Uttar Pradesh ==
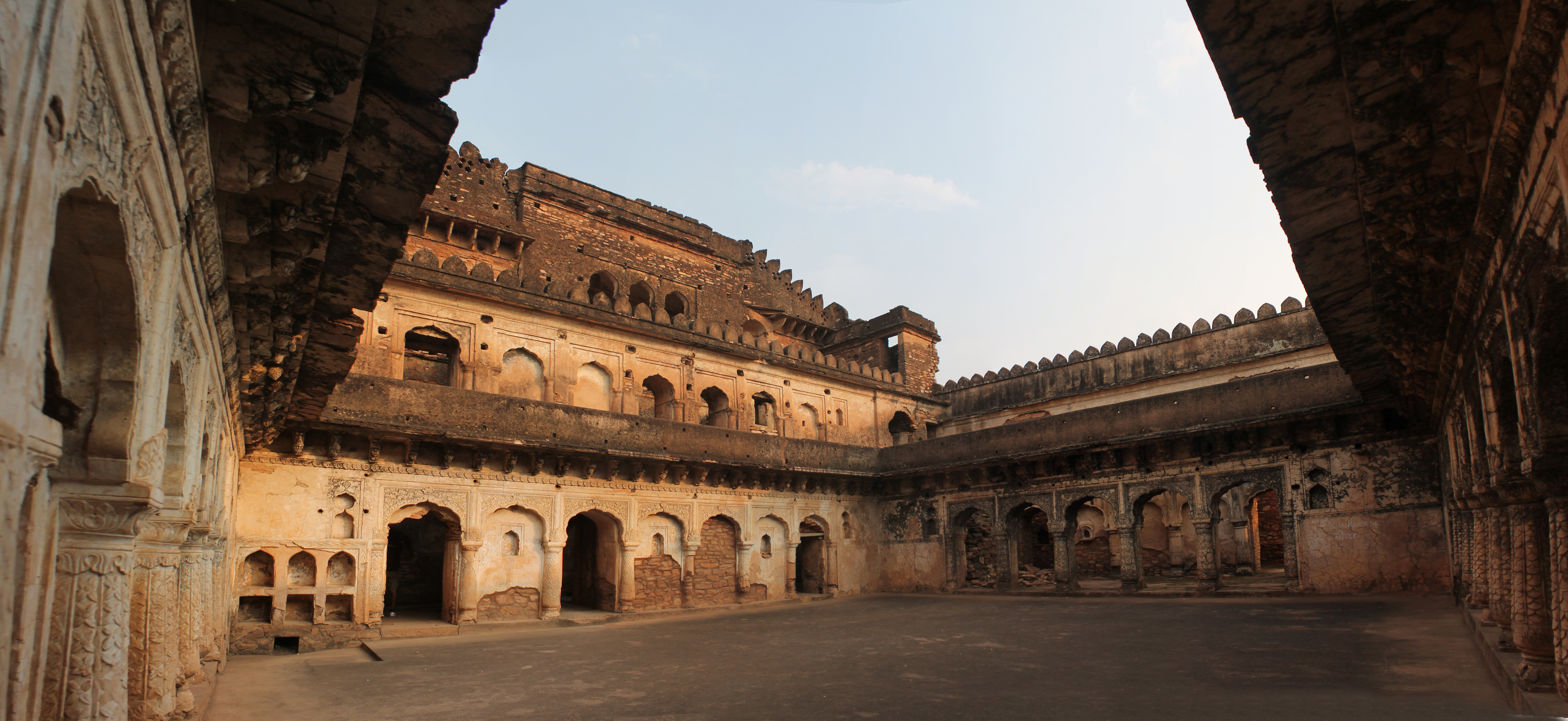
Rani Mahal, Kalinjar Fort

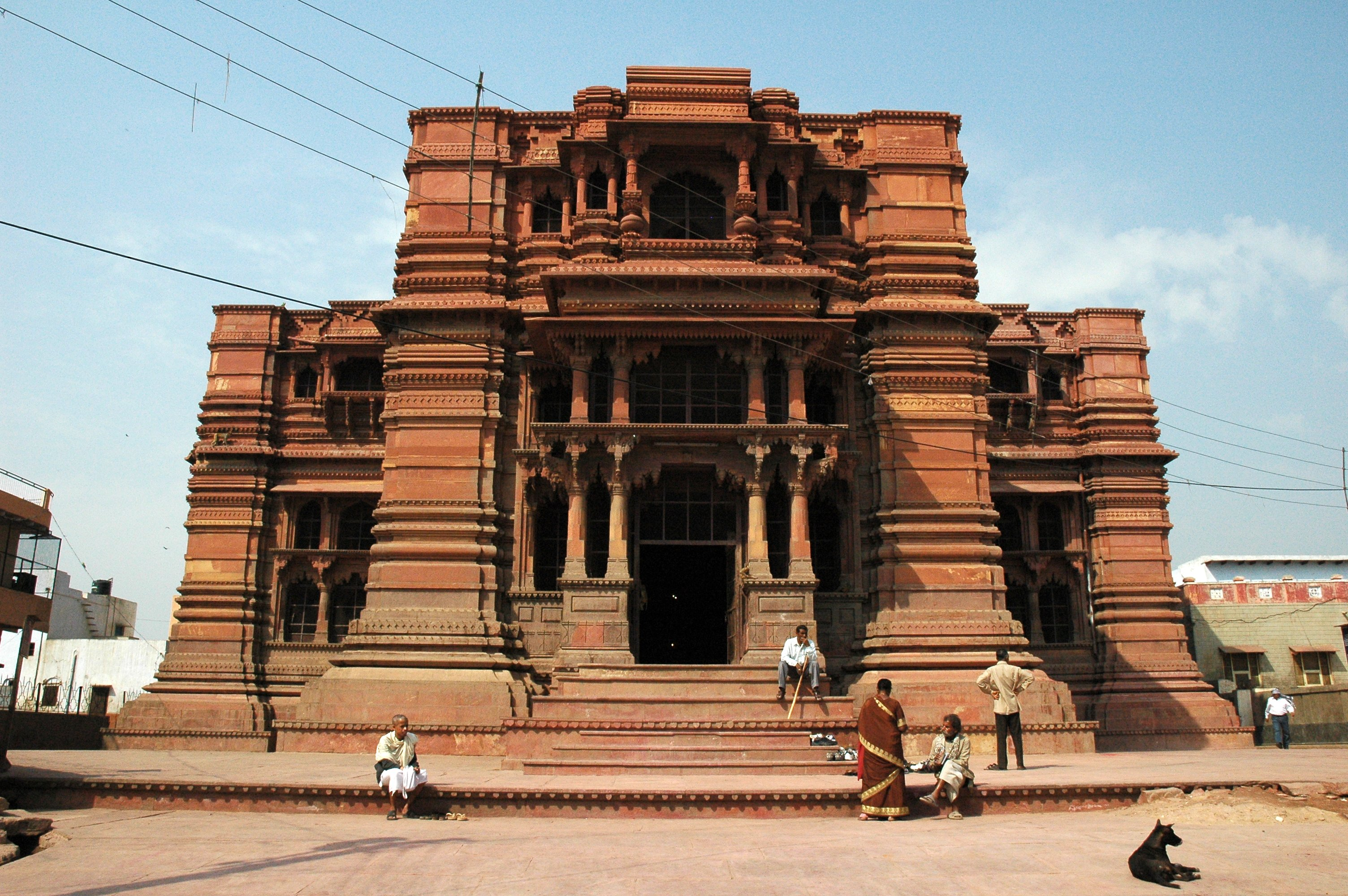
Govind Dev Temple, Vrindavan

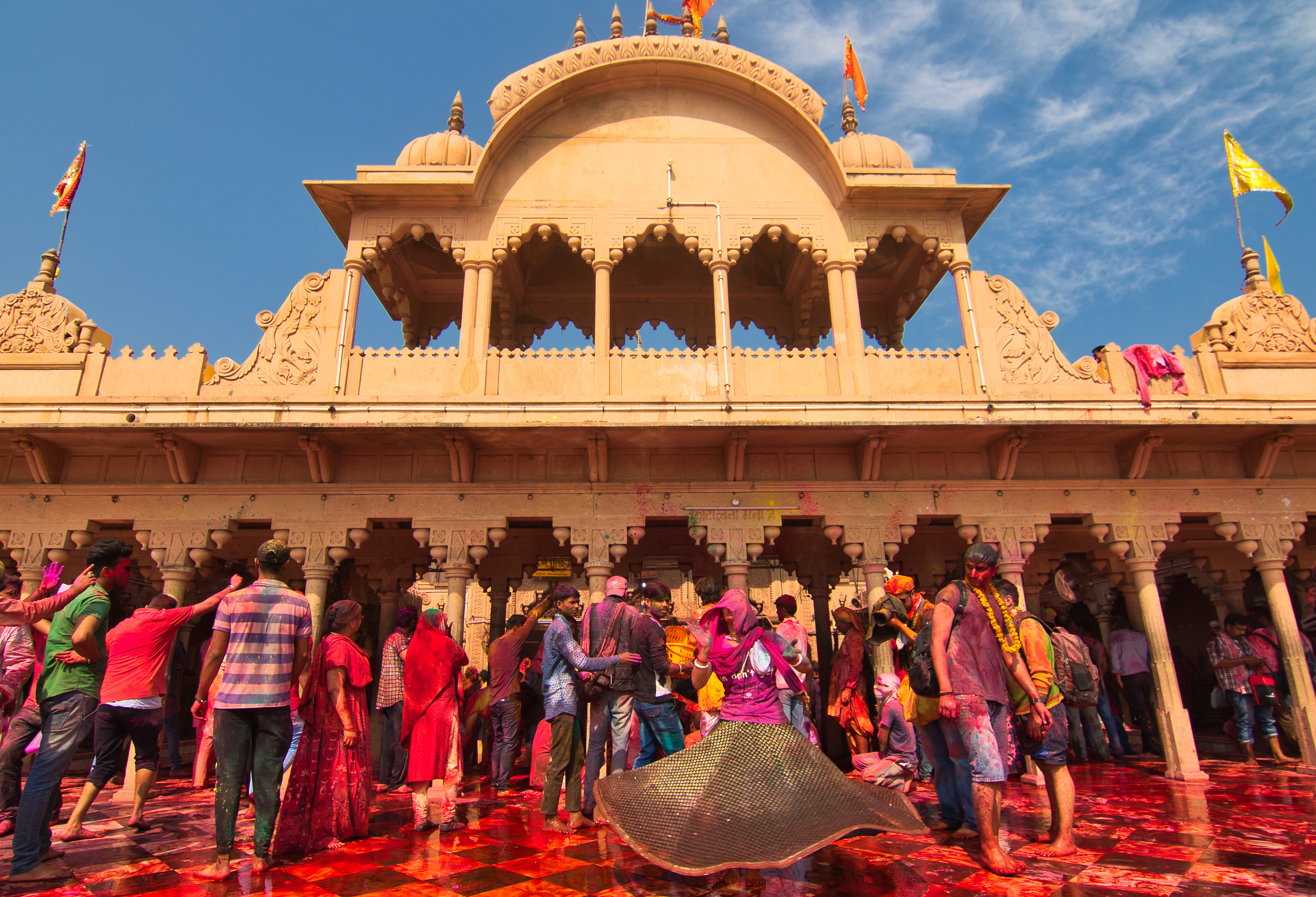
Radha Rani Temple, Barsana

Many Rajput dynasties ruled over Uttar Pradesh in the medieval era. Many forts, palaces and temples were built by the Rajputs. The Kalinjar Fort was built by the Chandela Rajput dynasty in the 10th century. Built on a rocky hill, the fort was also used by the Solankis of Rewa. The Jaichandra fort was built by the Rathore Rajputs of Kannauj.

The Jhansi Fort is attributed to the Bundela Rajput ruler Raja Bir Singh Ju Deo. The Sun temple and forts of Charkhari and Mangal Garh in the Mahoba district were built by the Chandela rulers of Bundelkhand.

== Himachal Pradesh ==
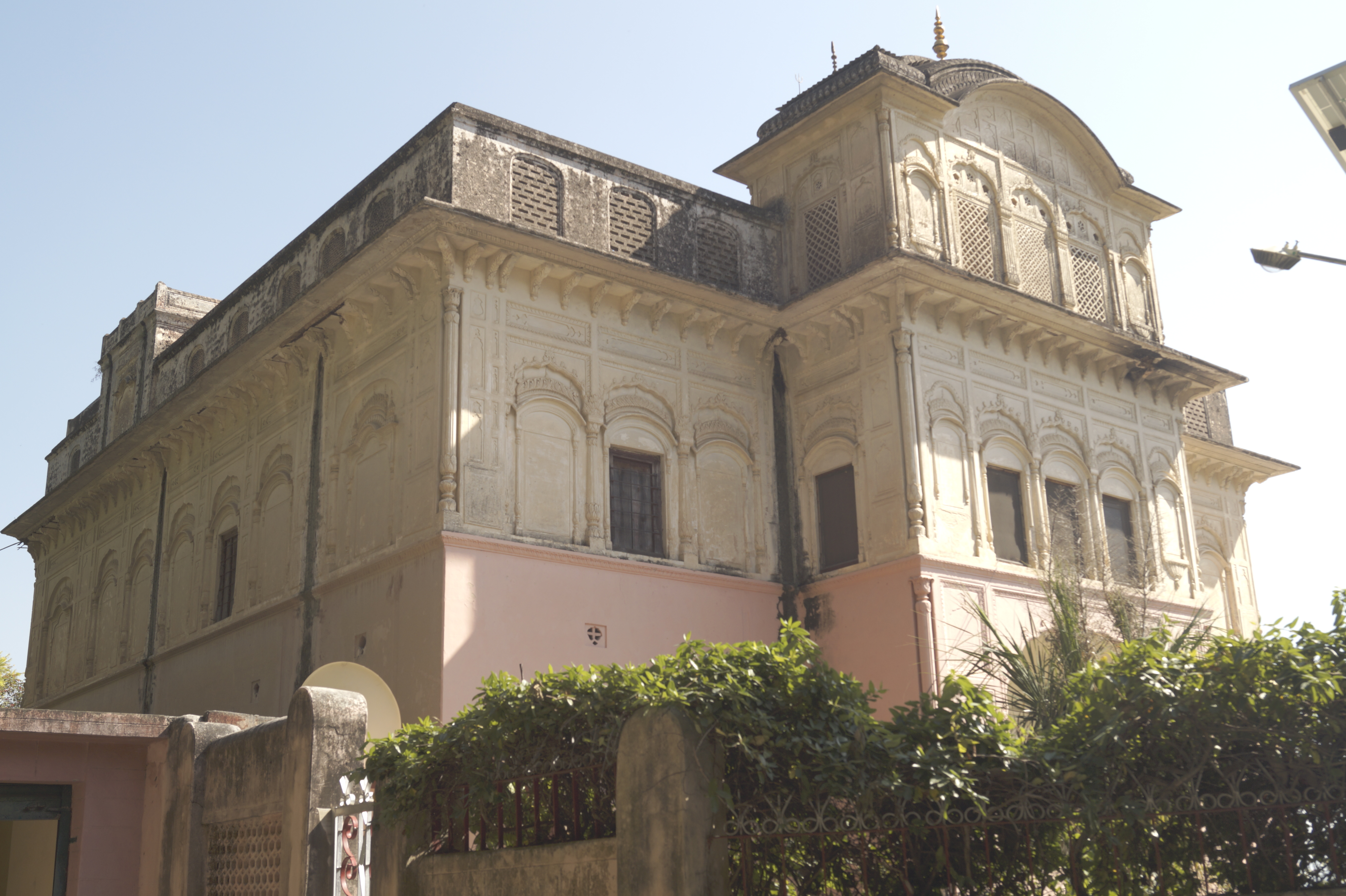
Side view of Arki Palace built inside the Arki Fort

The Kangra Fort was built by the ruling Katoch Rajput dynasty. The Arki Fort was built between 1695 - 1700 by Rana Prithvi Singh. The Kutlehar Fort was built by Sansar Chandra, the Rajput ruler of Kangra.

== Pakistan ==
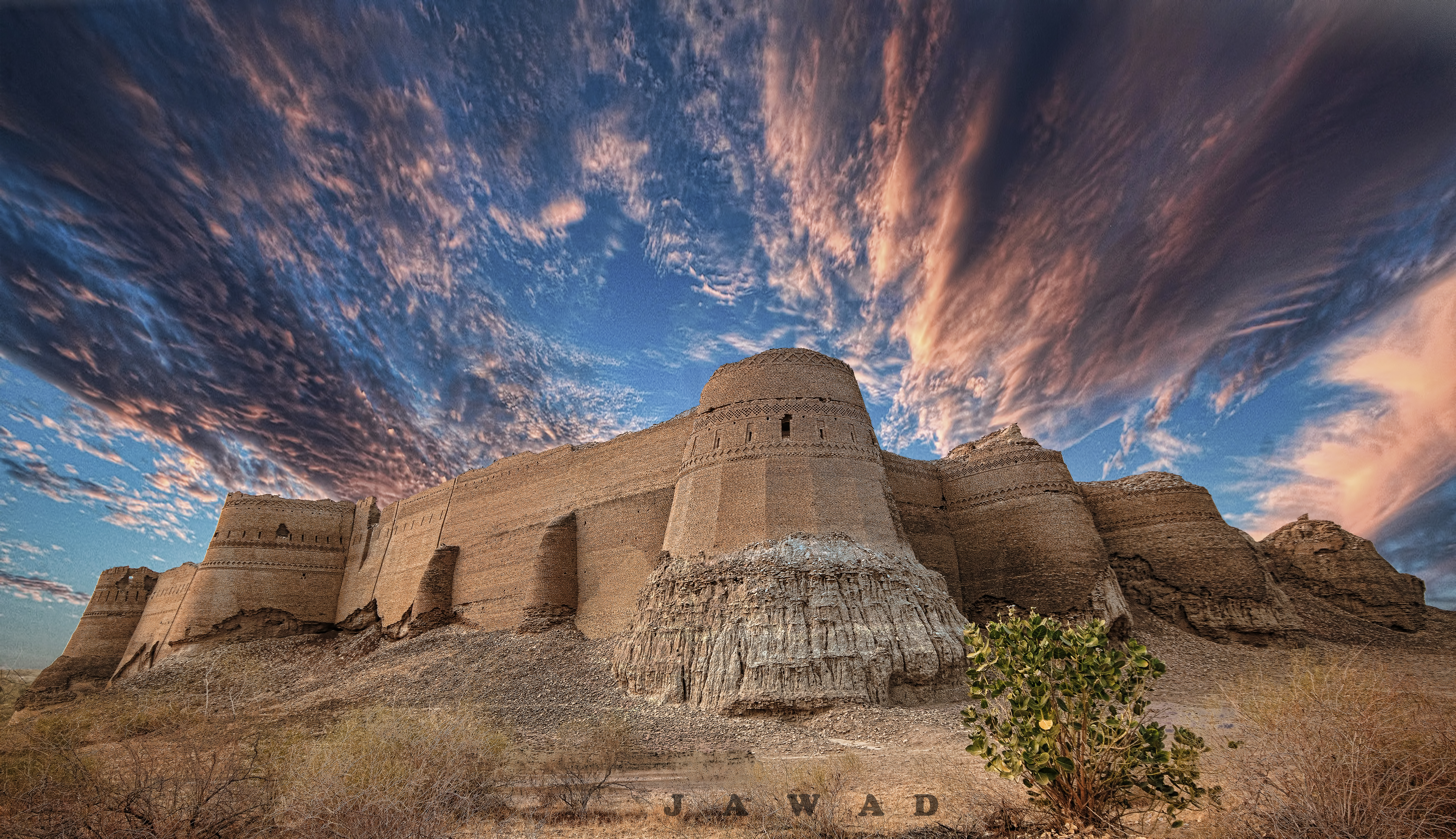
Islamgarh Fort

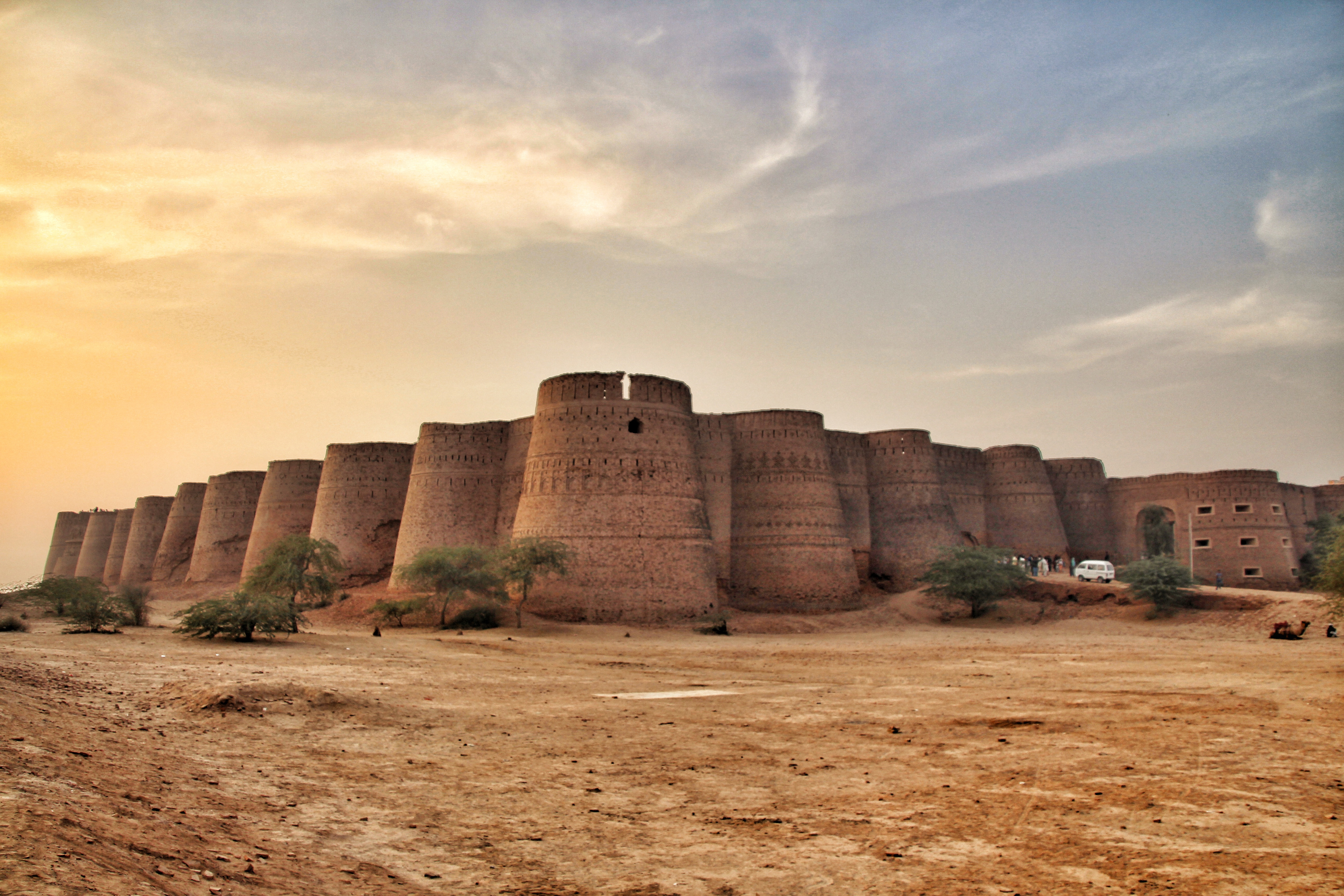
Derawar Fort in Cholistan, an example of Rajput architecture

The forts of Derawar and Amarkot were built by Hindu Rajput rulers during the medieval era, and are examples of early Rajput architecture.

== Gallery ==
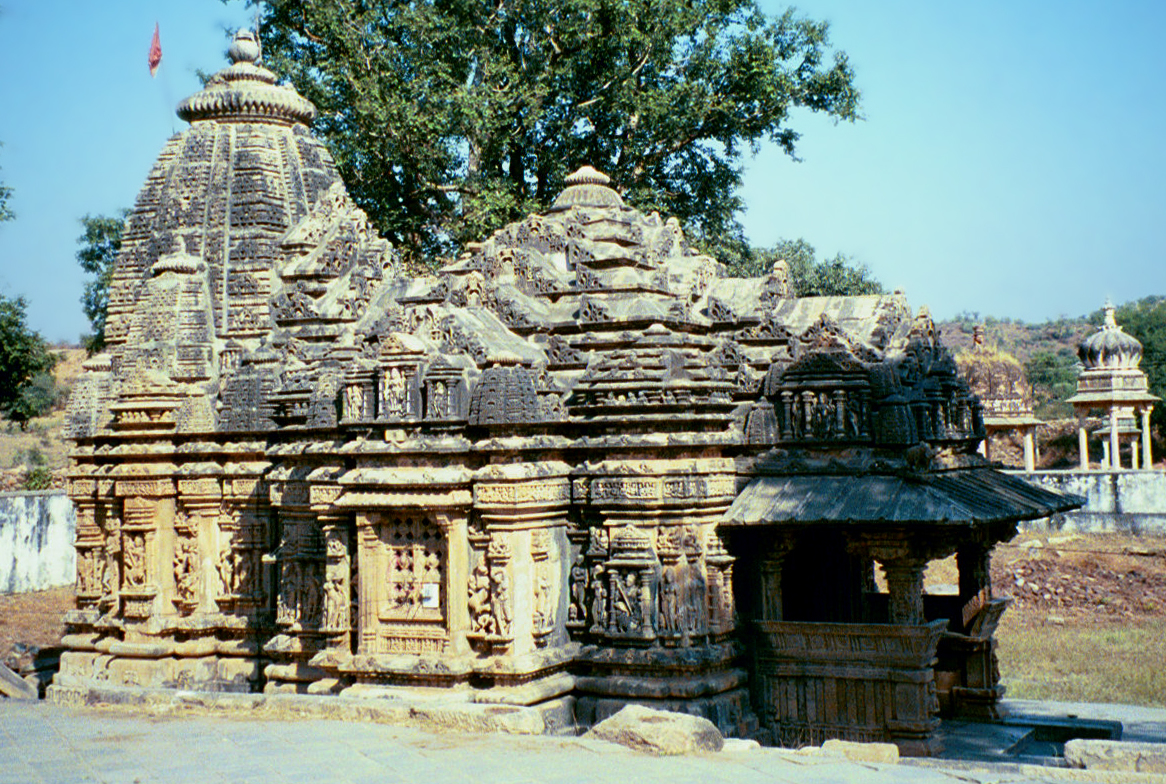
Ambika Mata temple in Jagat, Rajasthan, by 960

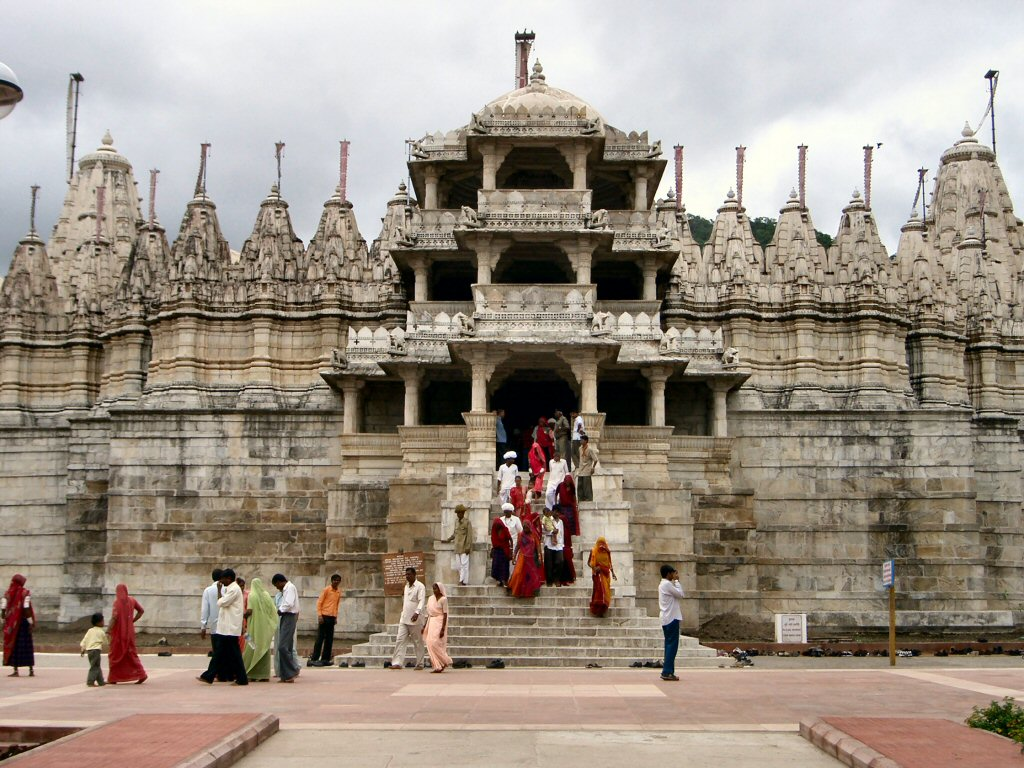
Ranakpur Jain temple

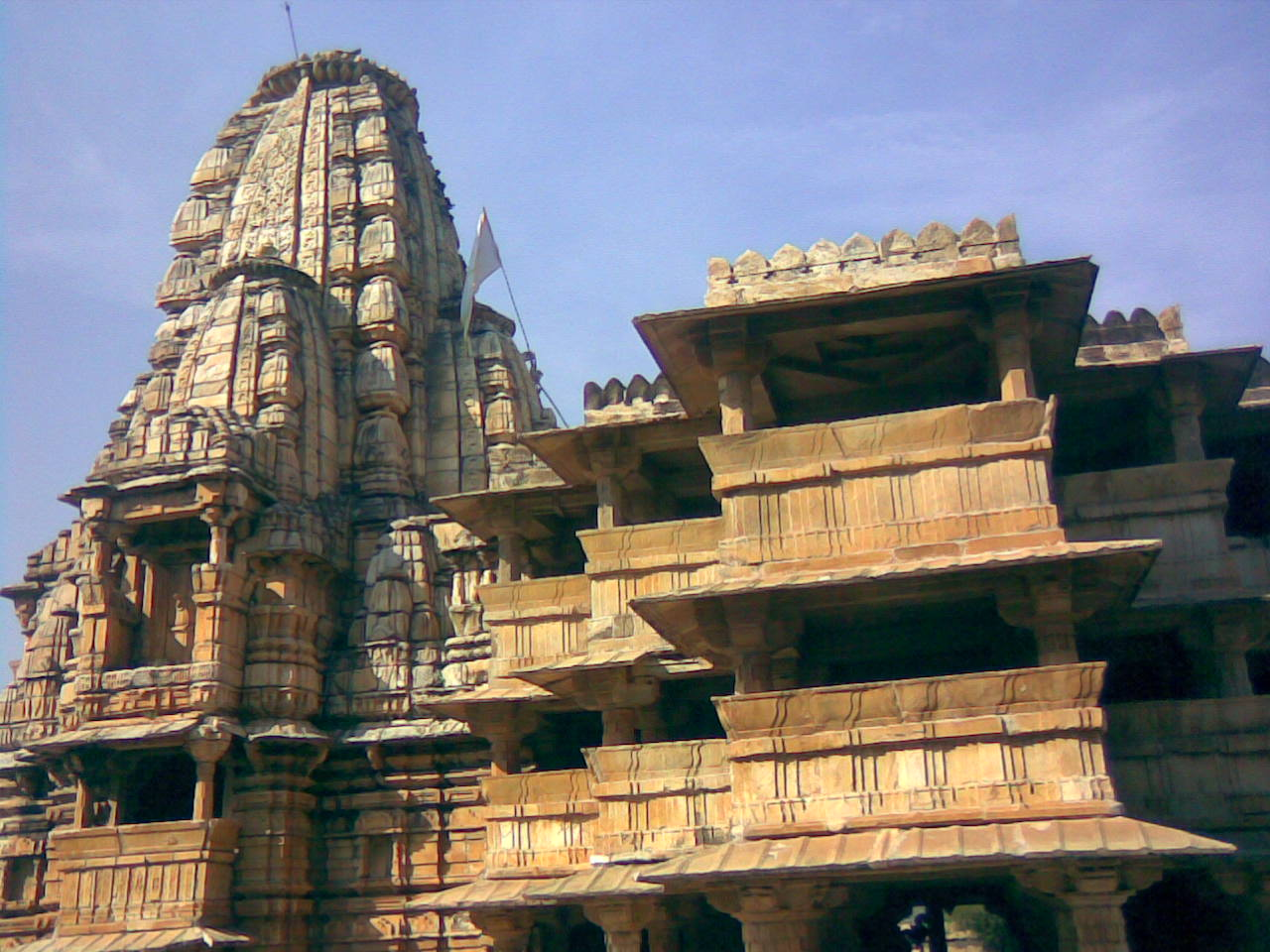
Dev Somnath Temple, Dungarpur

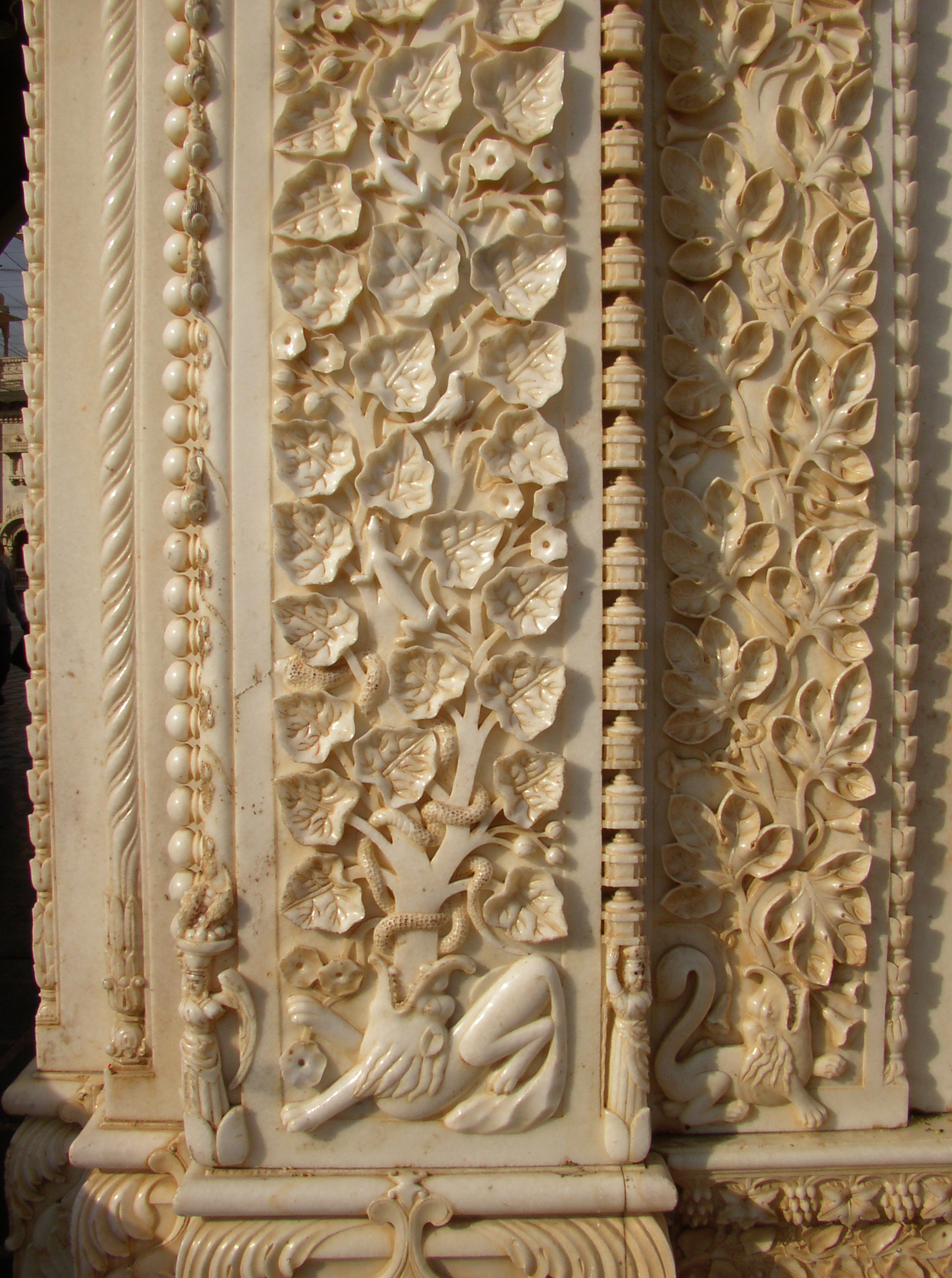
Detailed Stone work, Karni Mata Temple, Bikaner Rajasthan

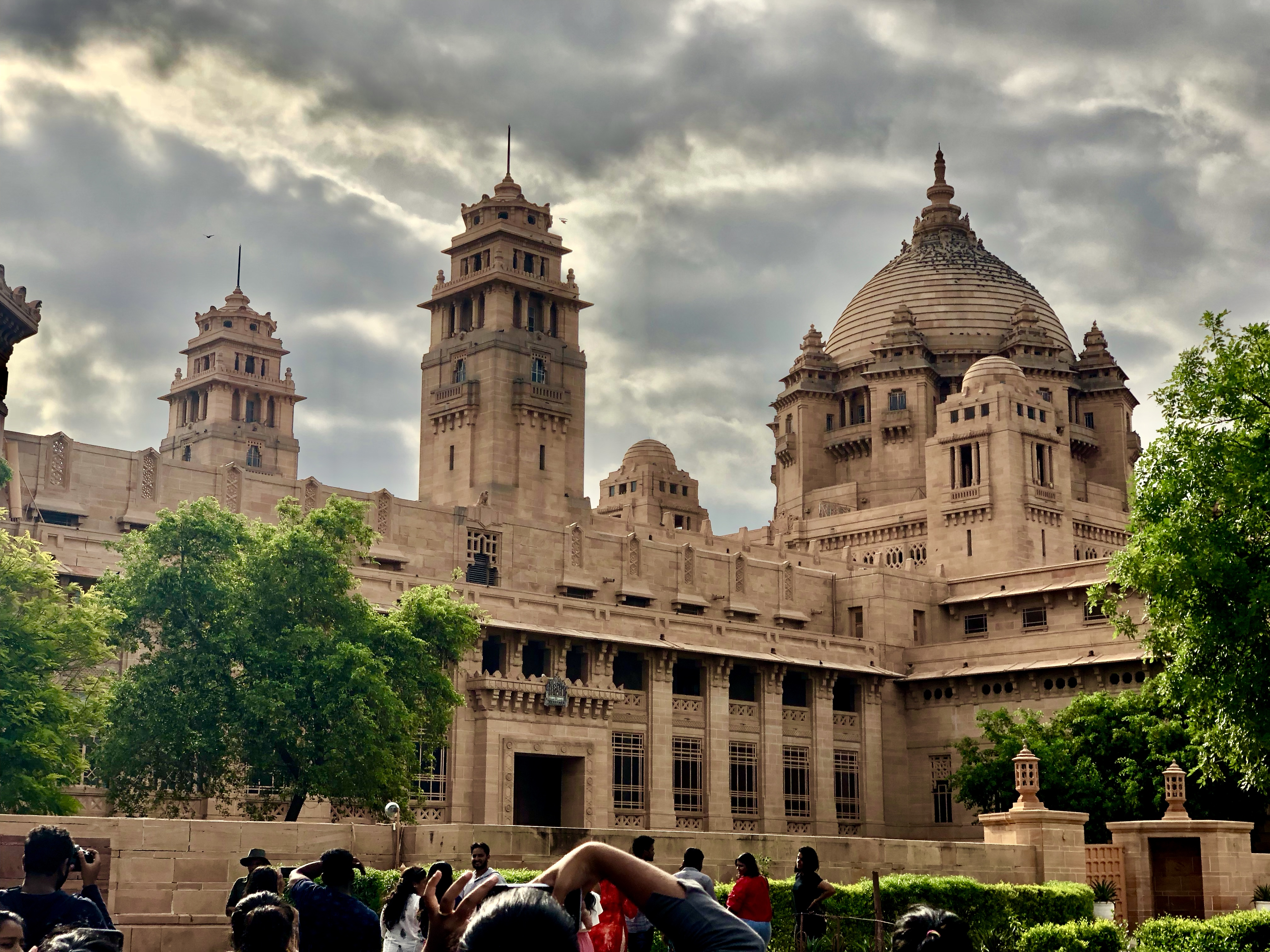
The Umaid Bhawan Palace at Jodhpur built between 1929 and 1942 is one of the largest royal palaces in the world. It was designed by Henry Vaughan Lanchester in a blend of Beaux-Arts and traditional Rajput styles

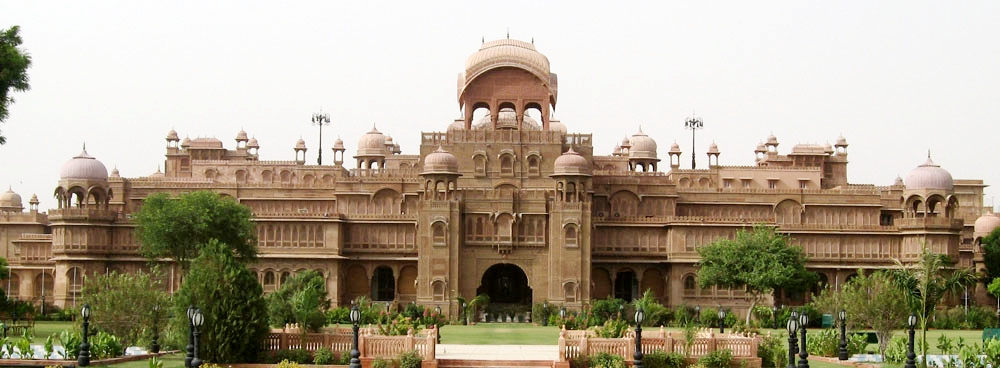
Lalgarh Palace, Bikaner, designed in the Indo-Saracenic style by Samuel Swinton Jacob

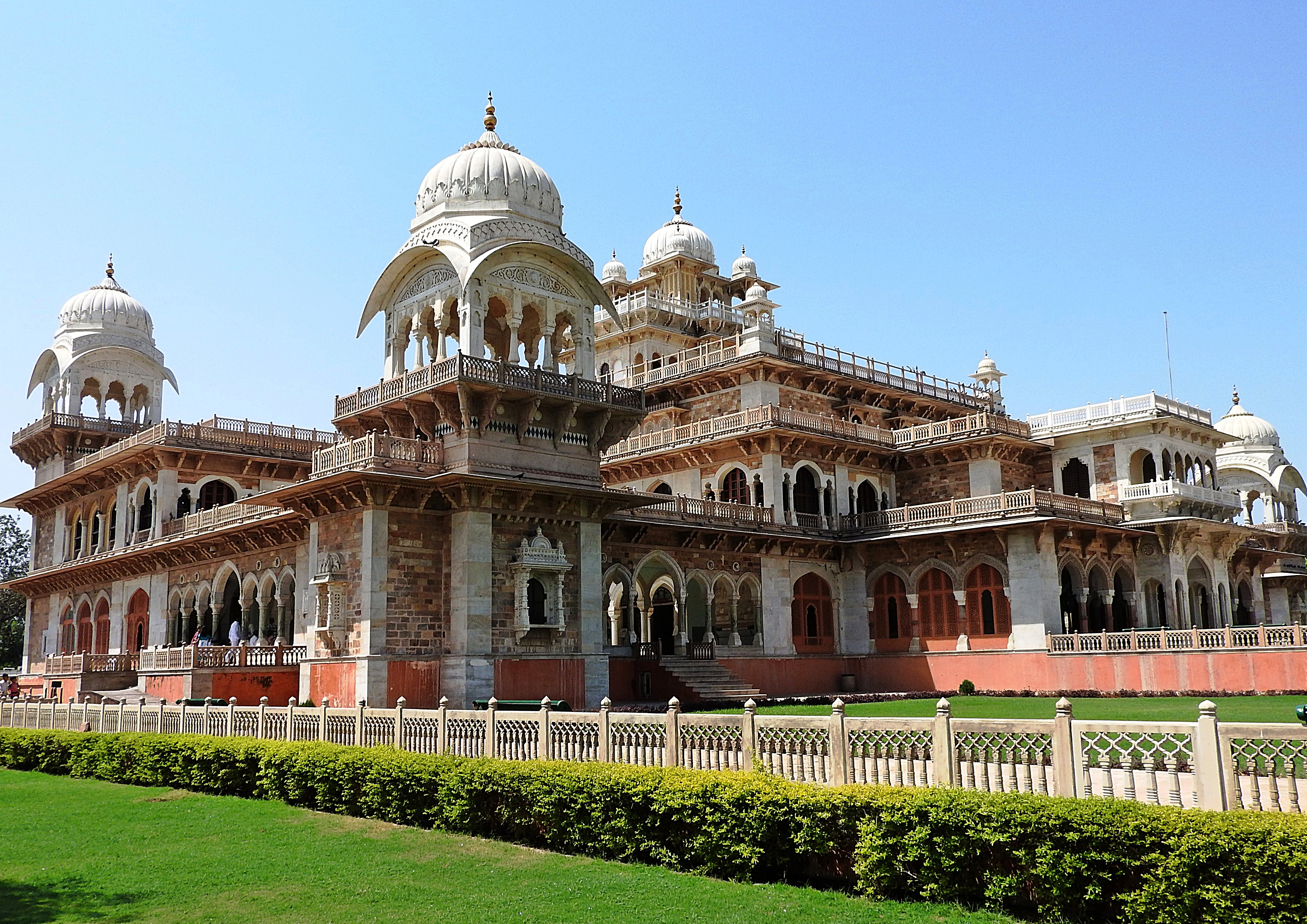
The Albert Hall Museum was designed by Samuel Swinton Jacob, and was opened as public museum in 1887

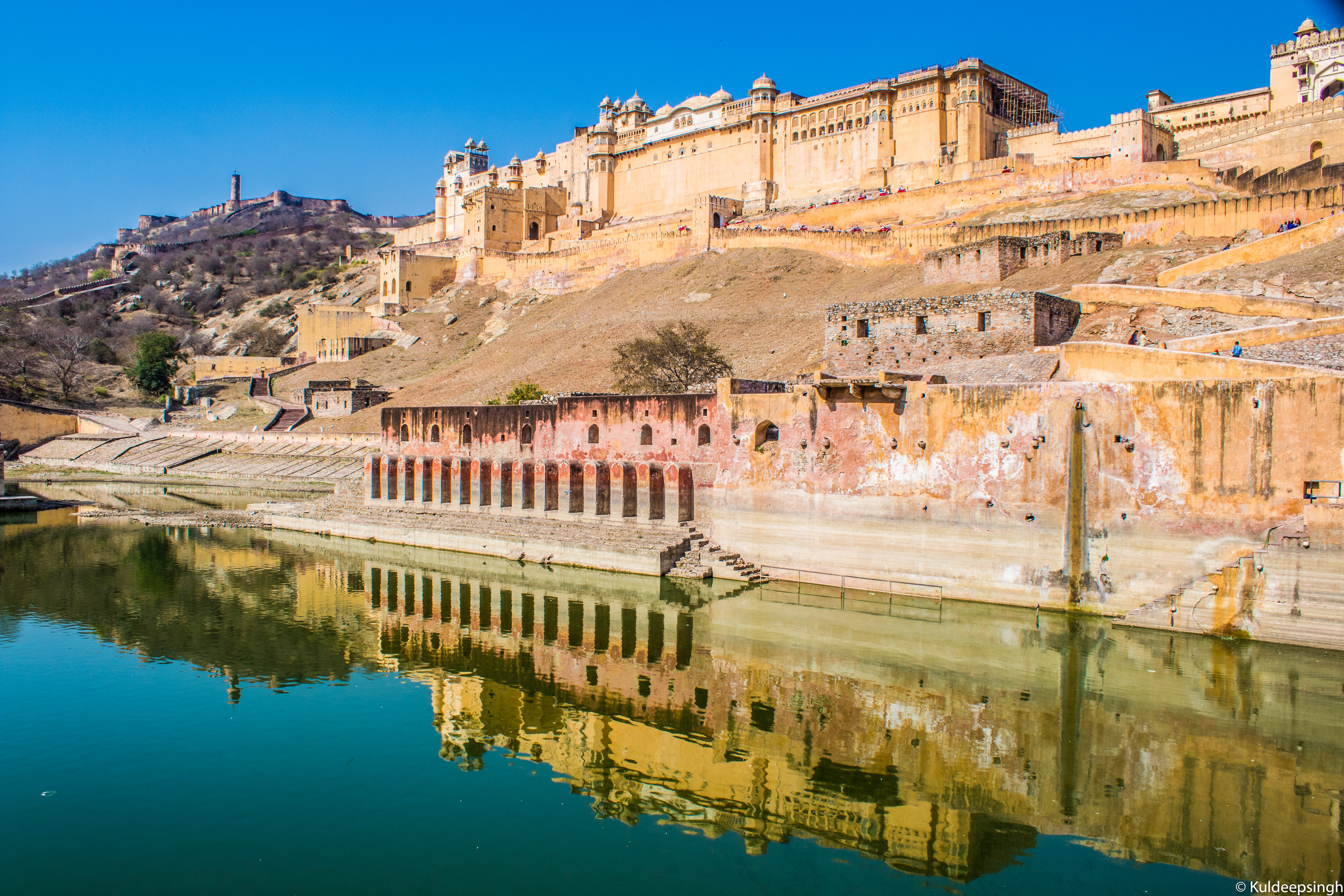
Amer Fort

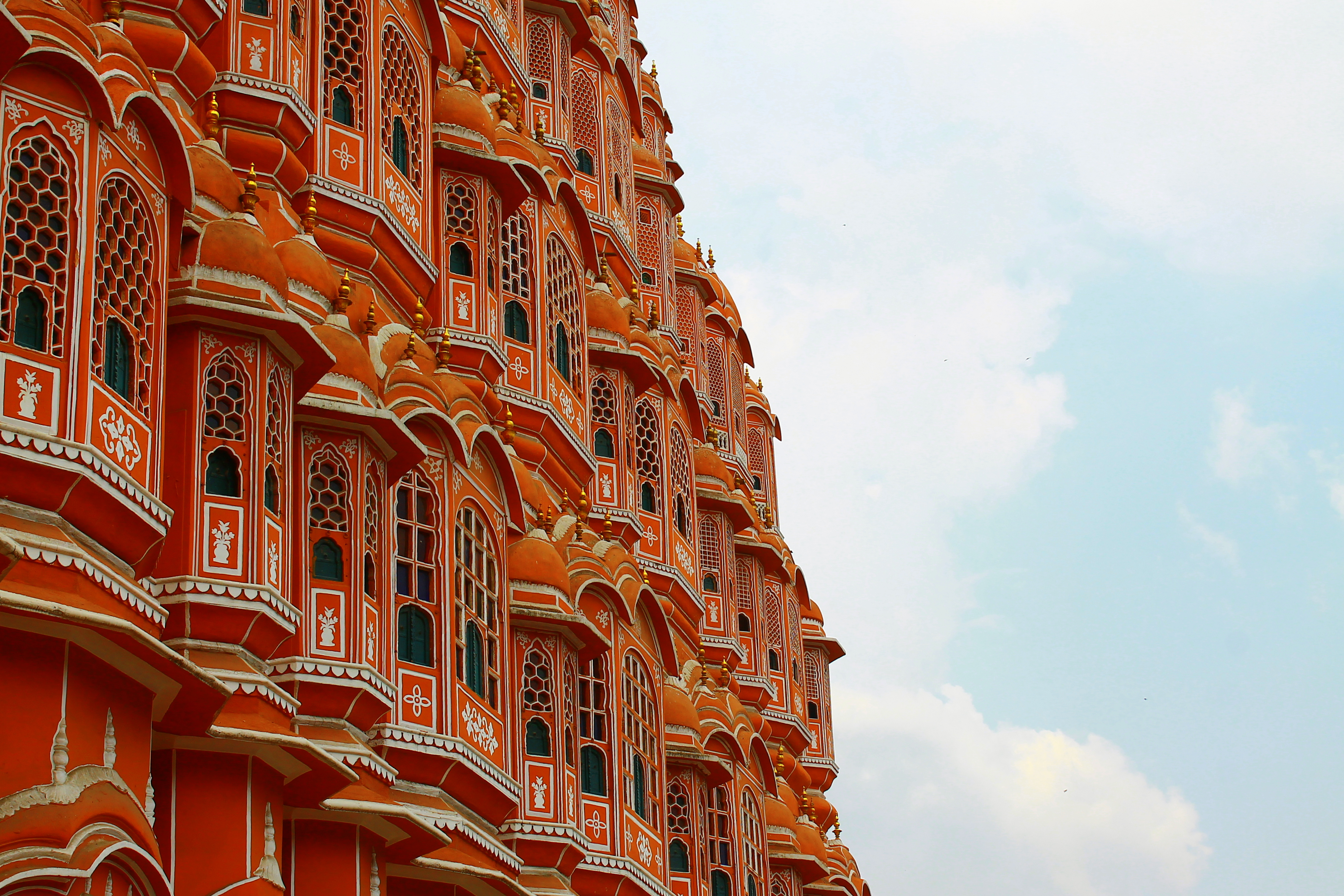
Hawa Mahal, Jaipur

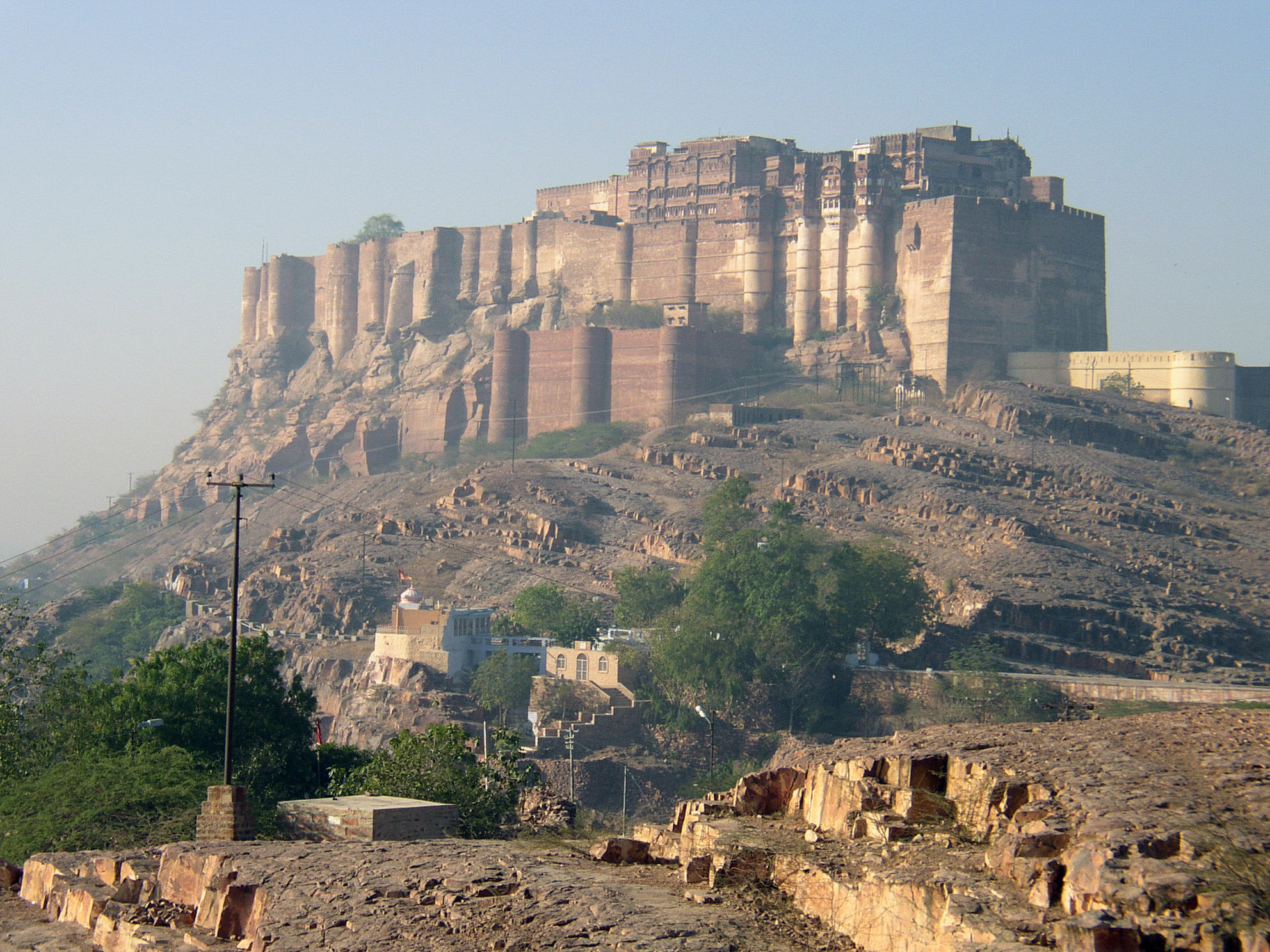
Mehrangarh Fort, Jodhpur

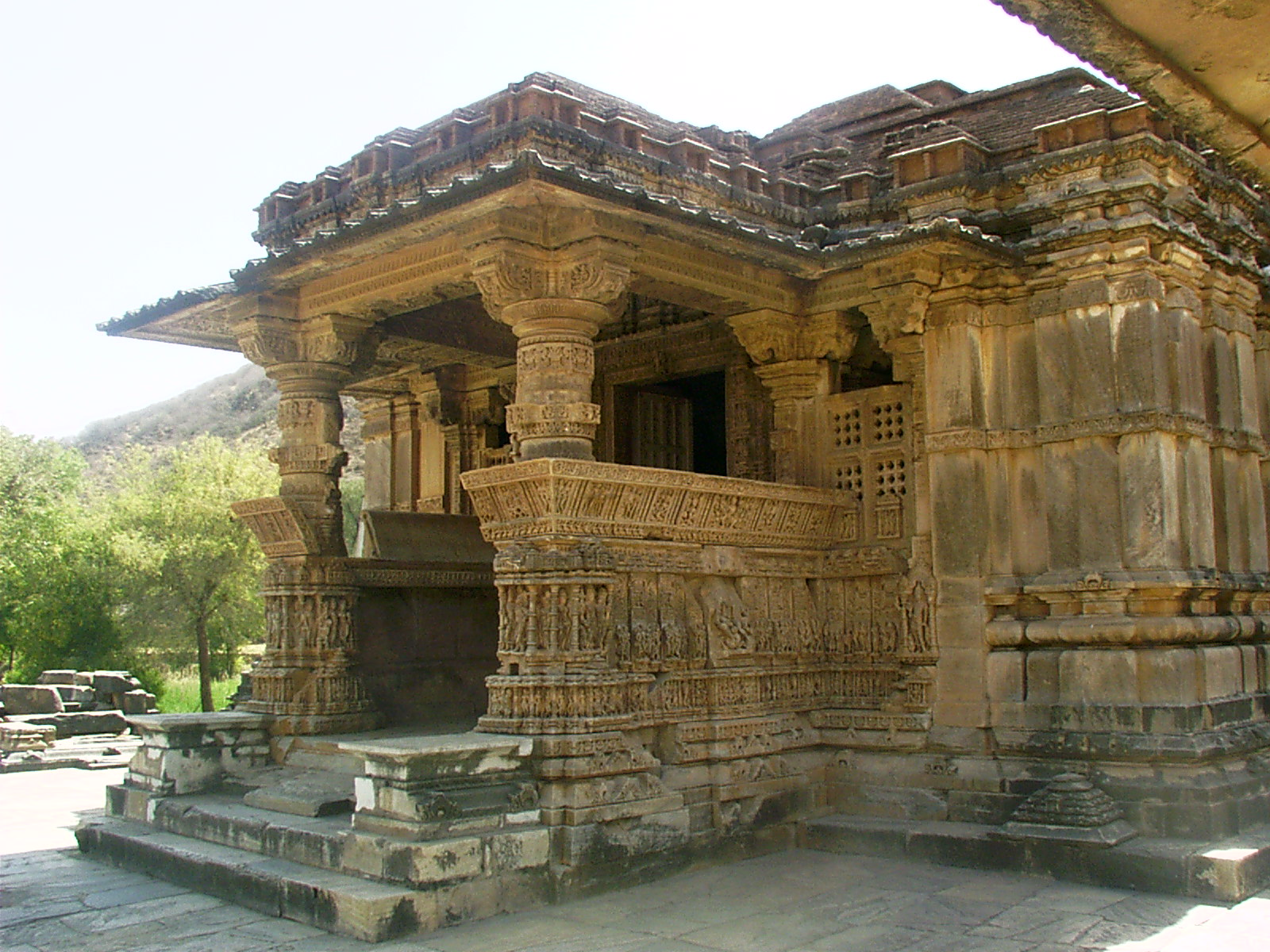
One of the Sahasra Bahu Temples built during the 10th century CE in Pratihara era

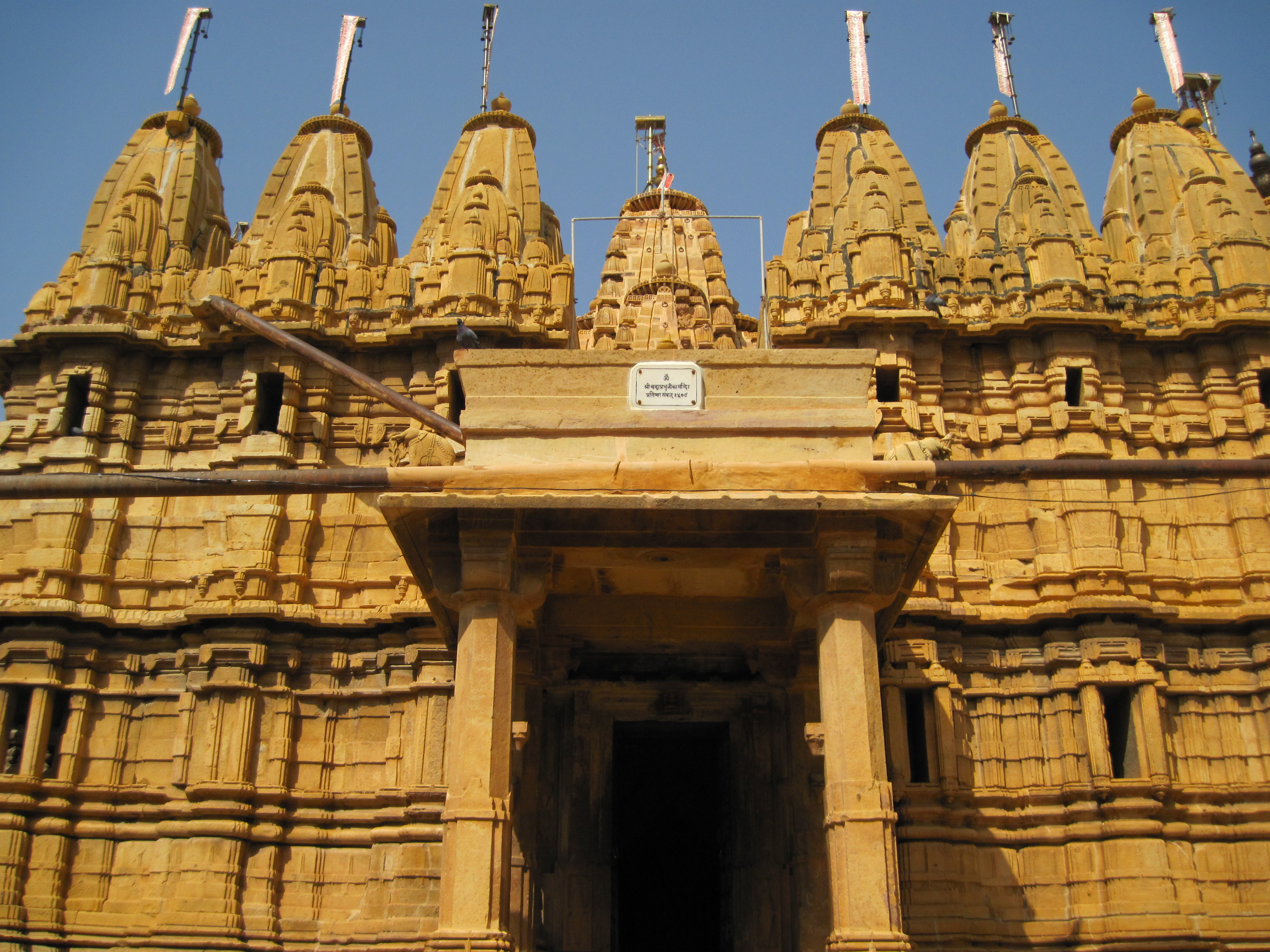
Jain Temple inside Jaisalmer Fort

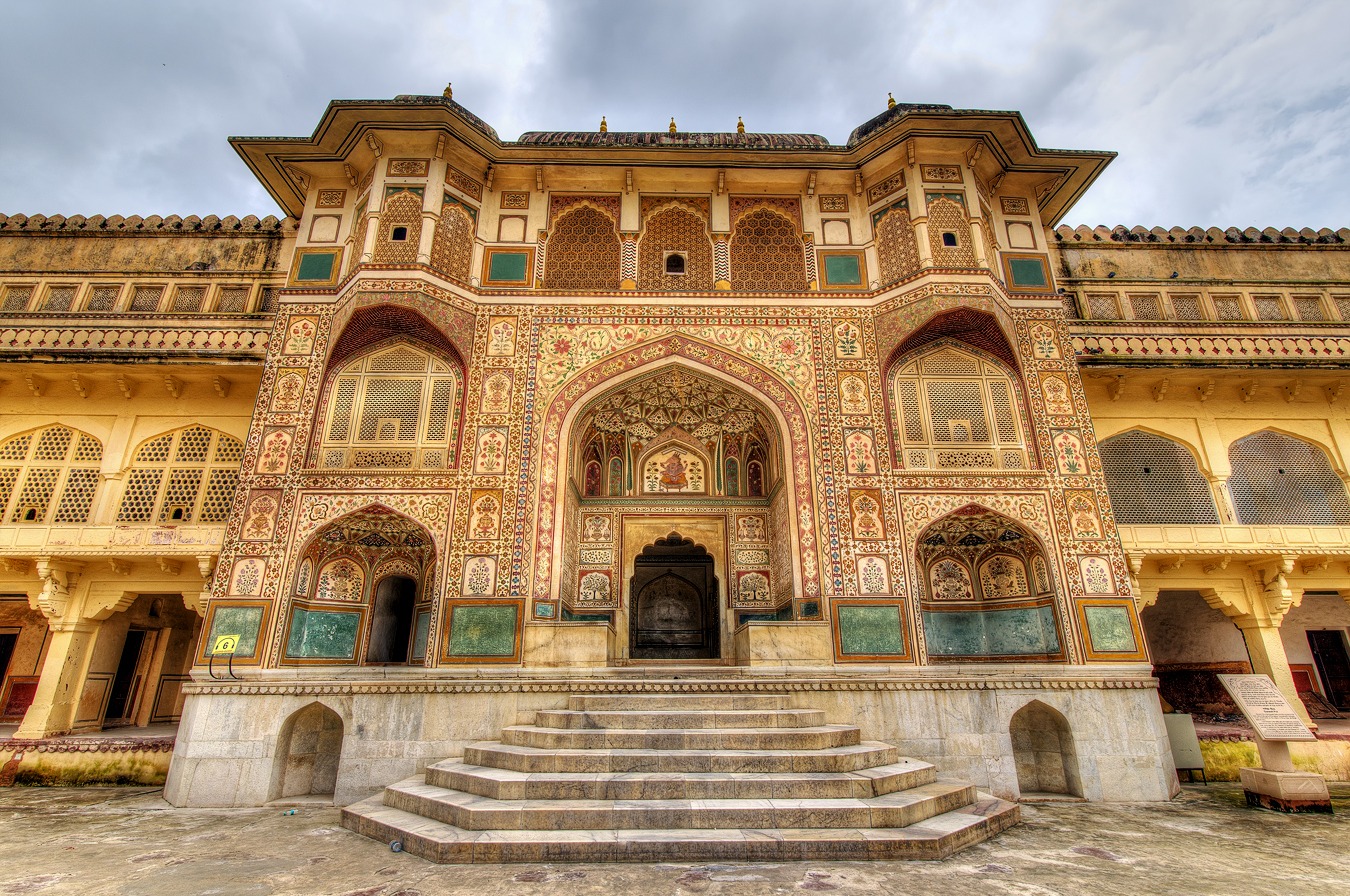
Ganesh Pol Entrance, Amer Fort

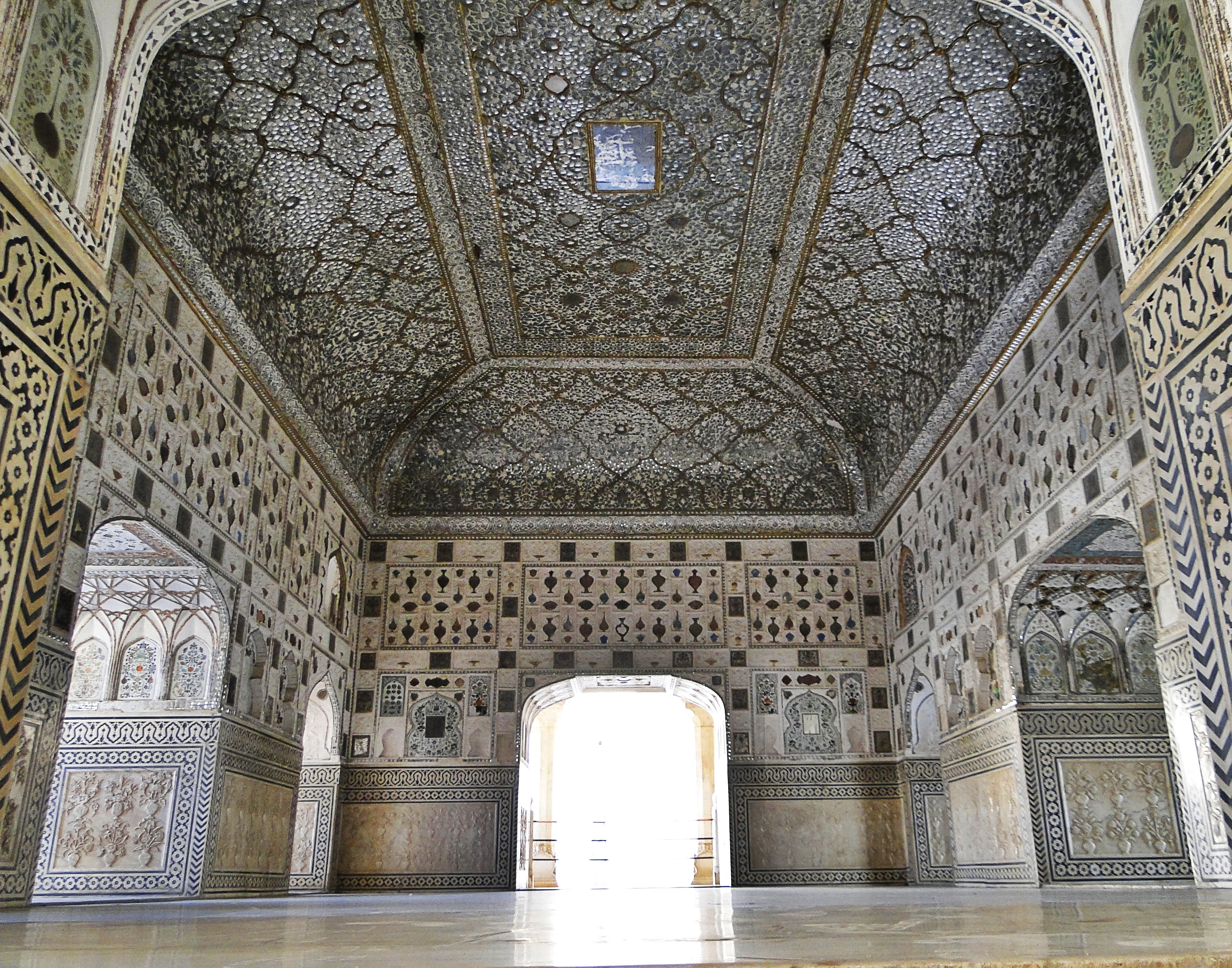
Sheesh Mahal, Amer Fort

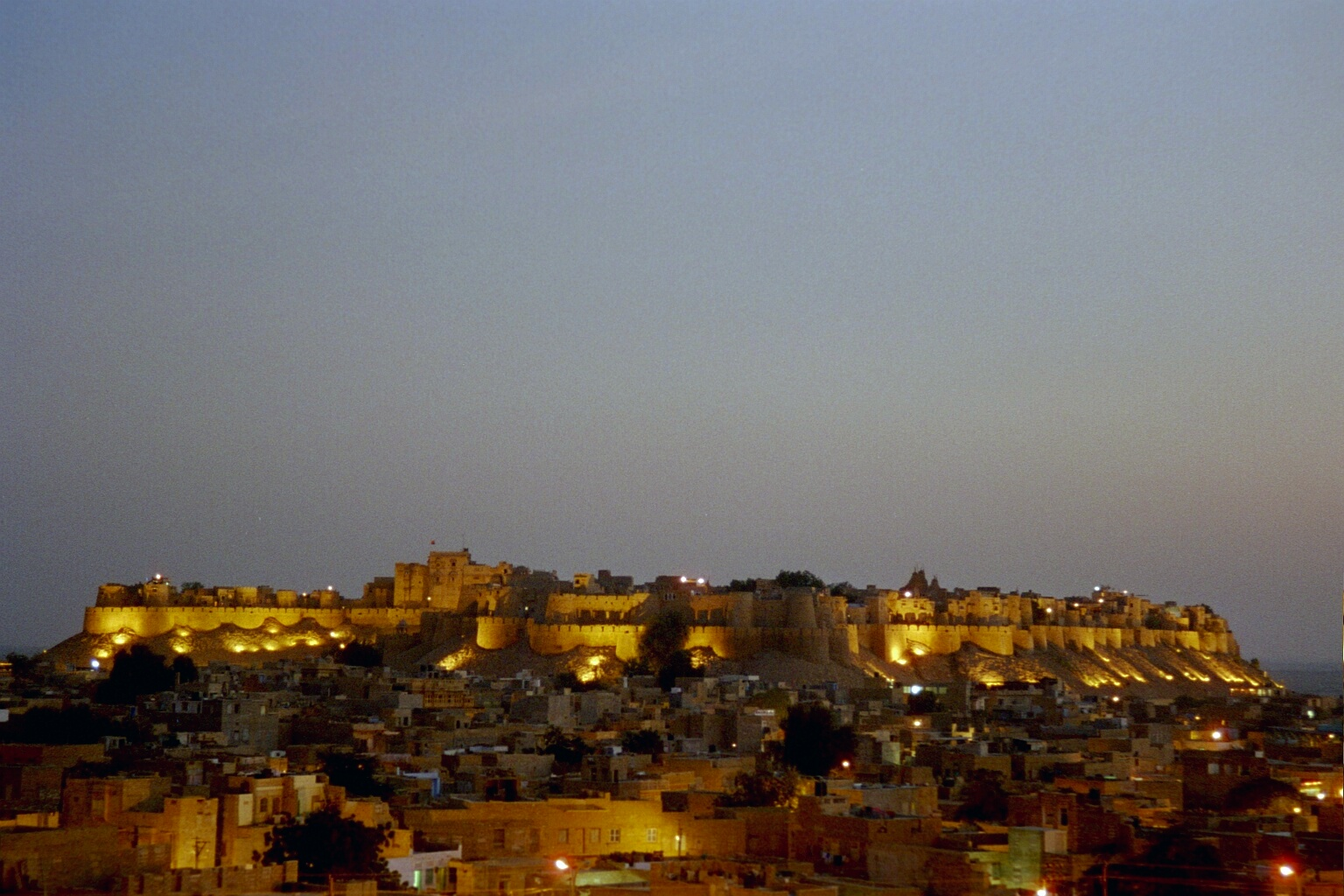
Jaisalmer Fort

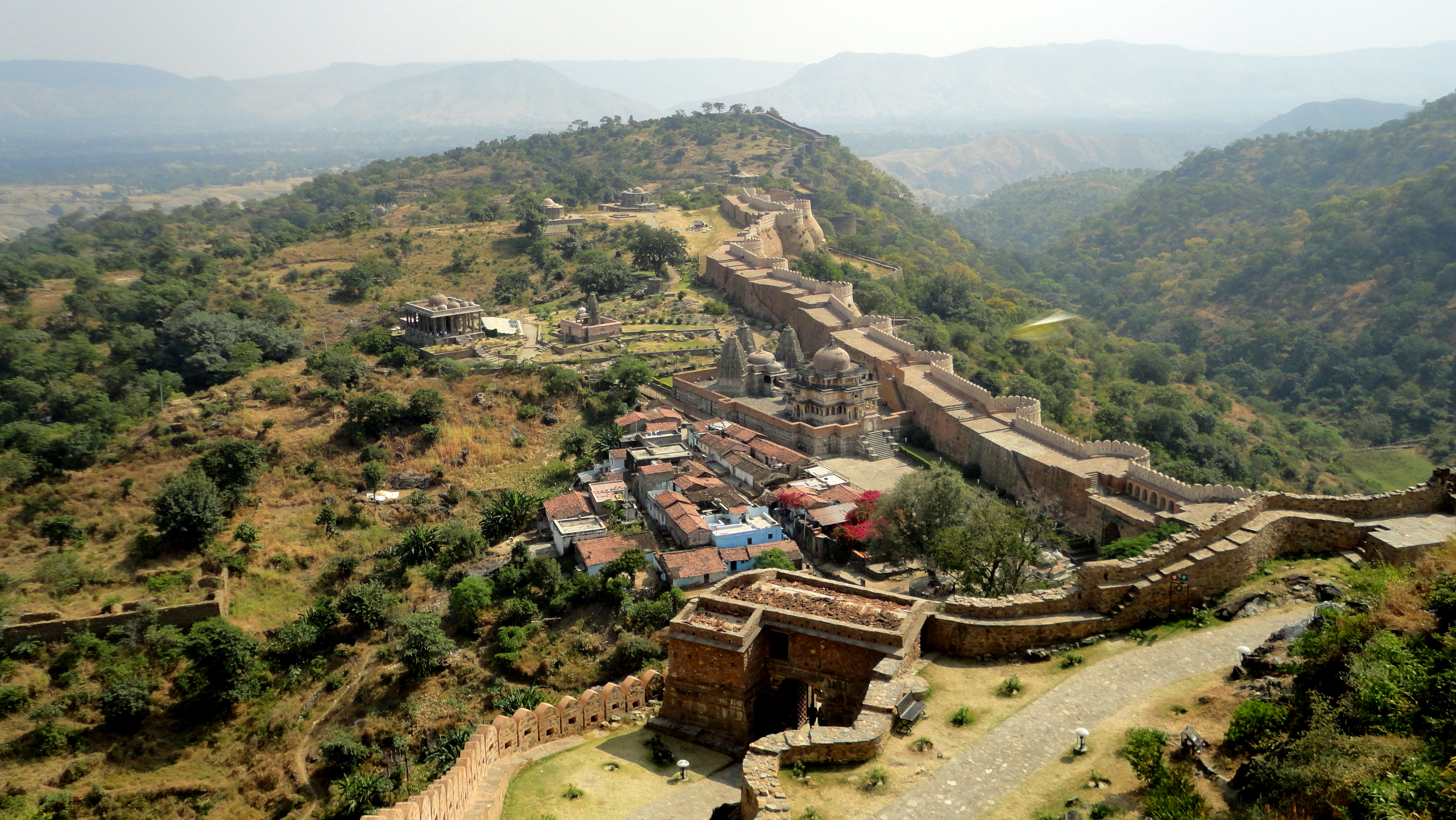
Aerial view of Kumbhalgarh Fort

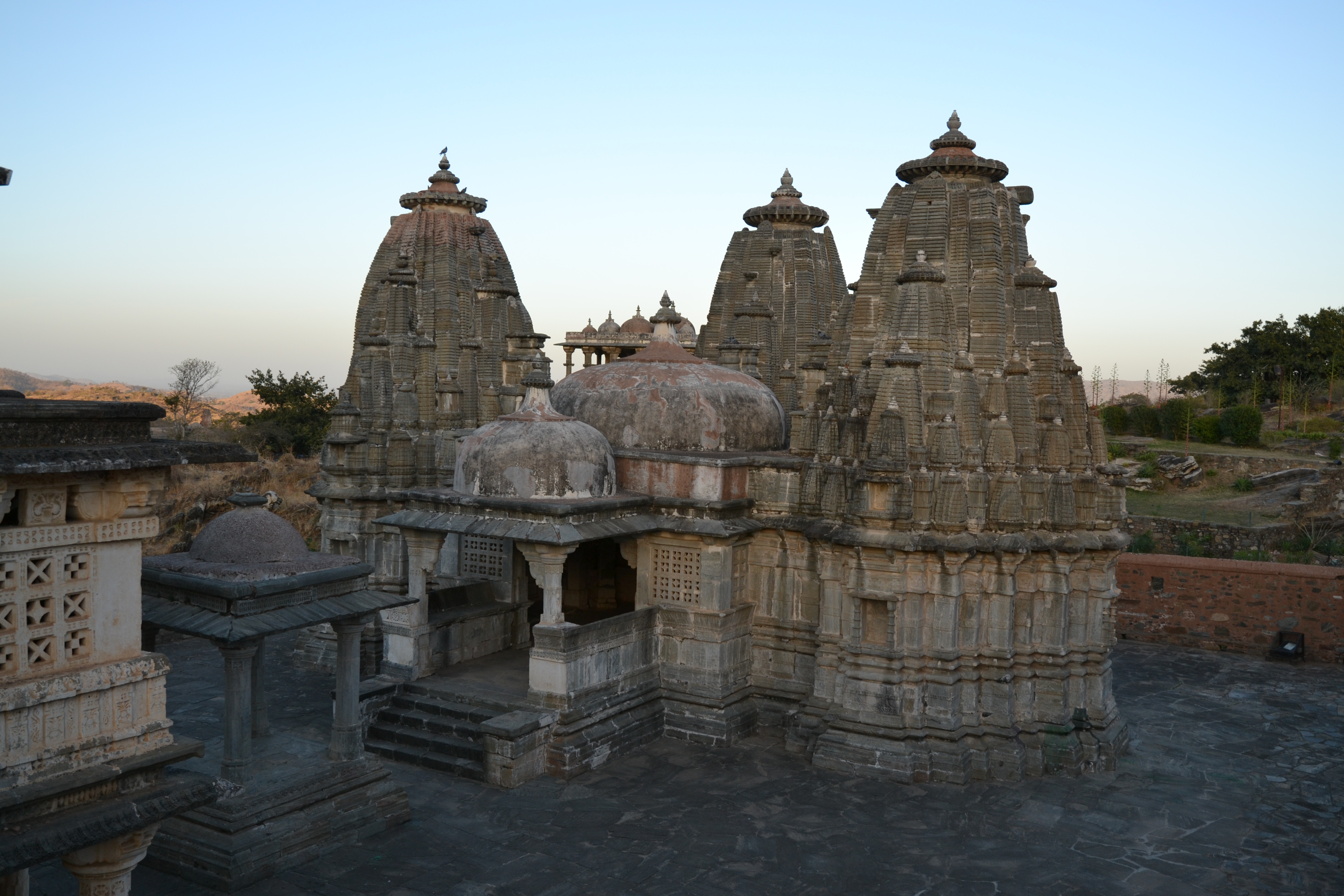
Hindu temple, Kumbhalgarh Fort

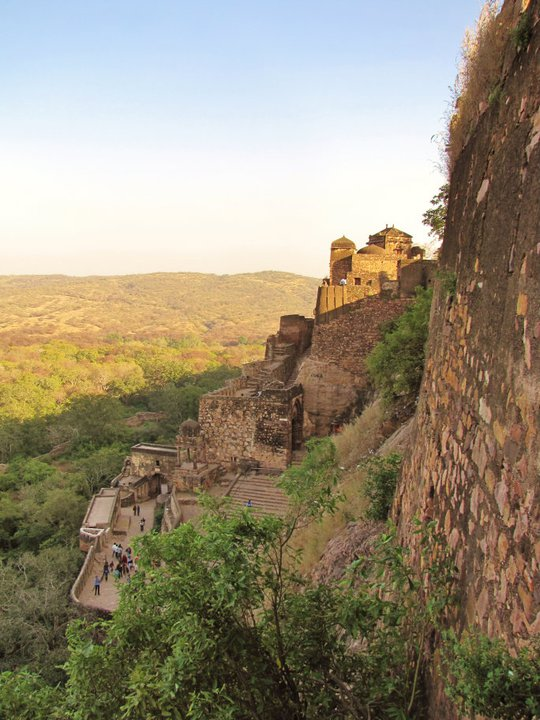
Ranthambhore Fort

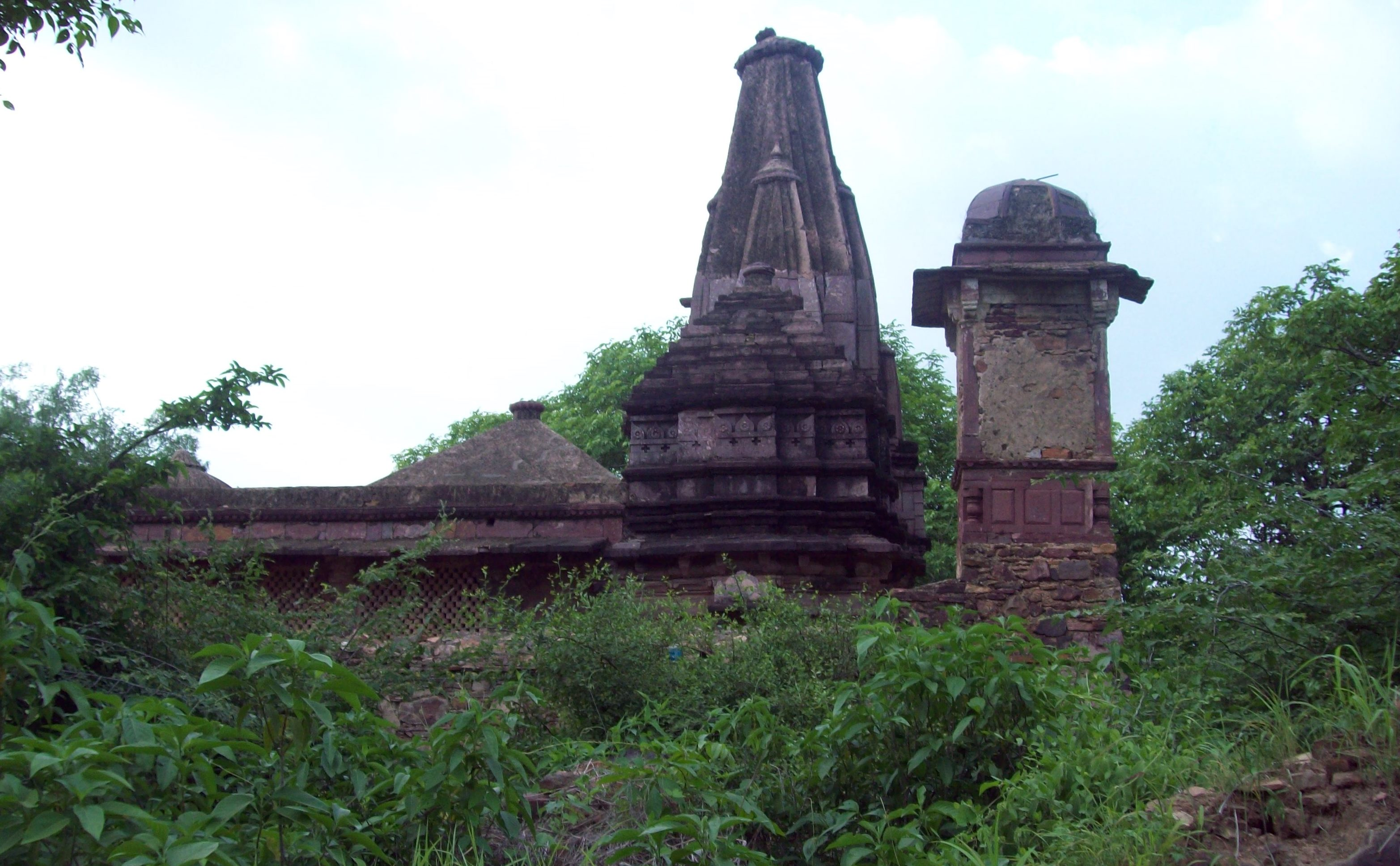
Jain Temple, Ranthambore Fort

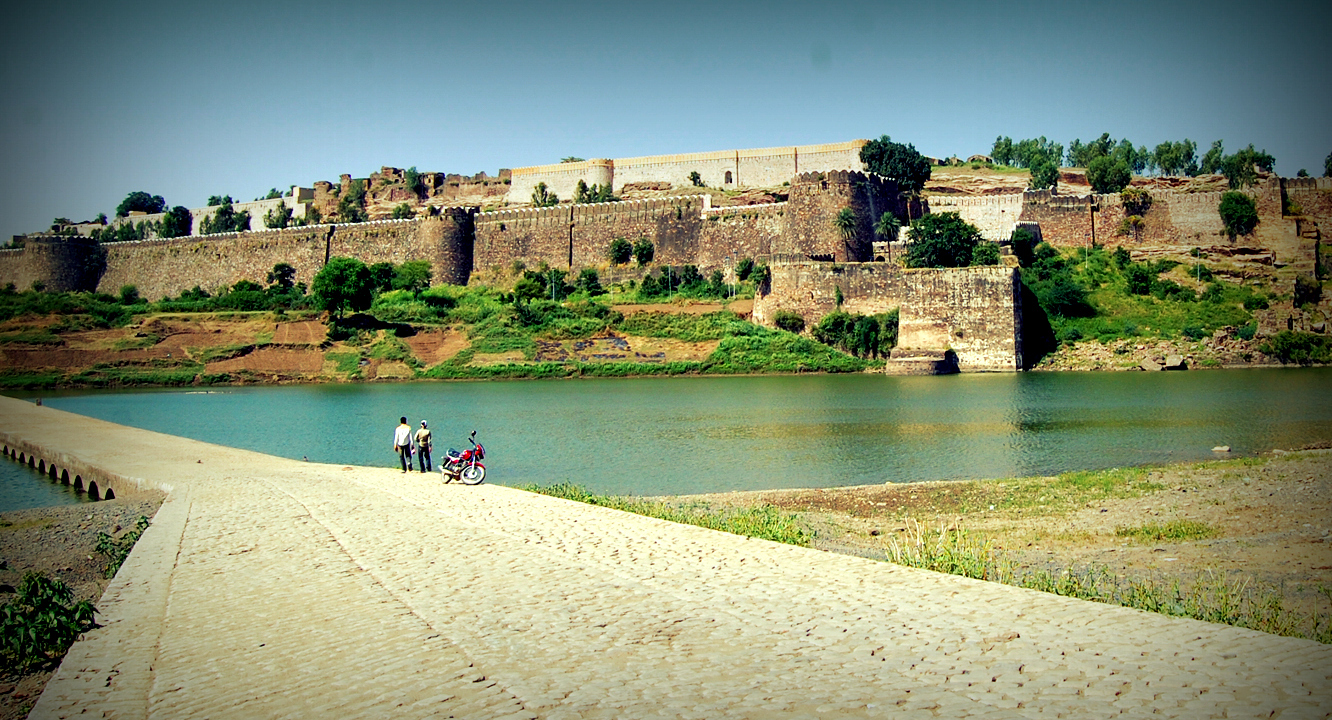
Gagron Fort

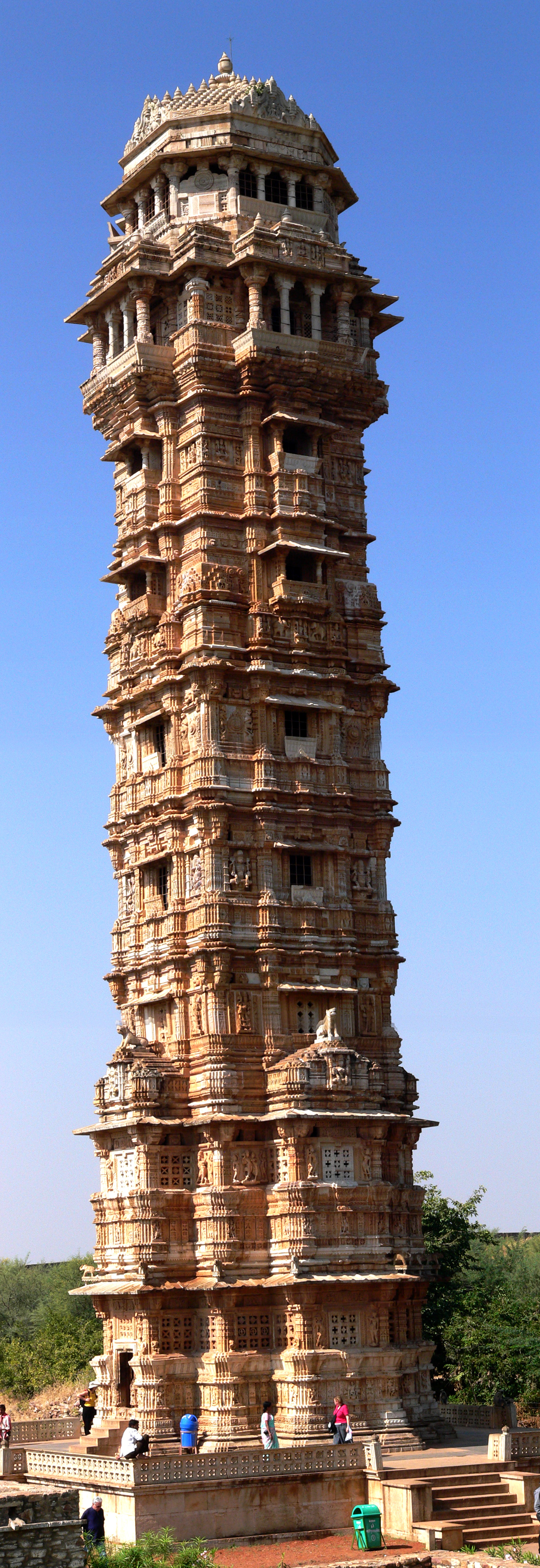
Vijay Stambha at Chittor Fort
