= Islamgarh Fort =

Fort in Punjab, Pakistan

Islamgarh Fort قلعہ اسلام گڑھ
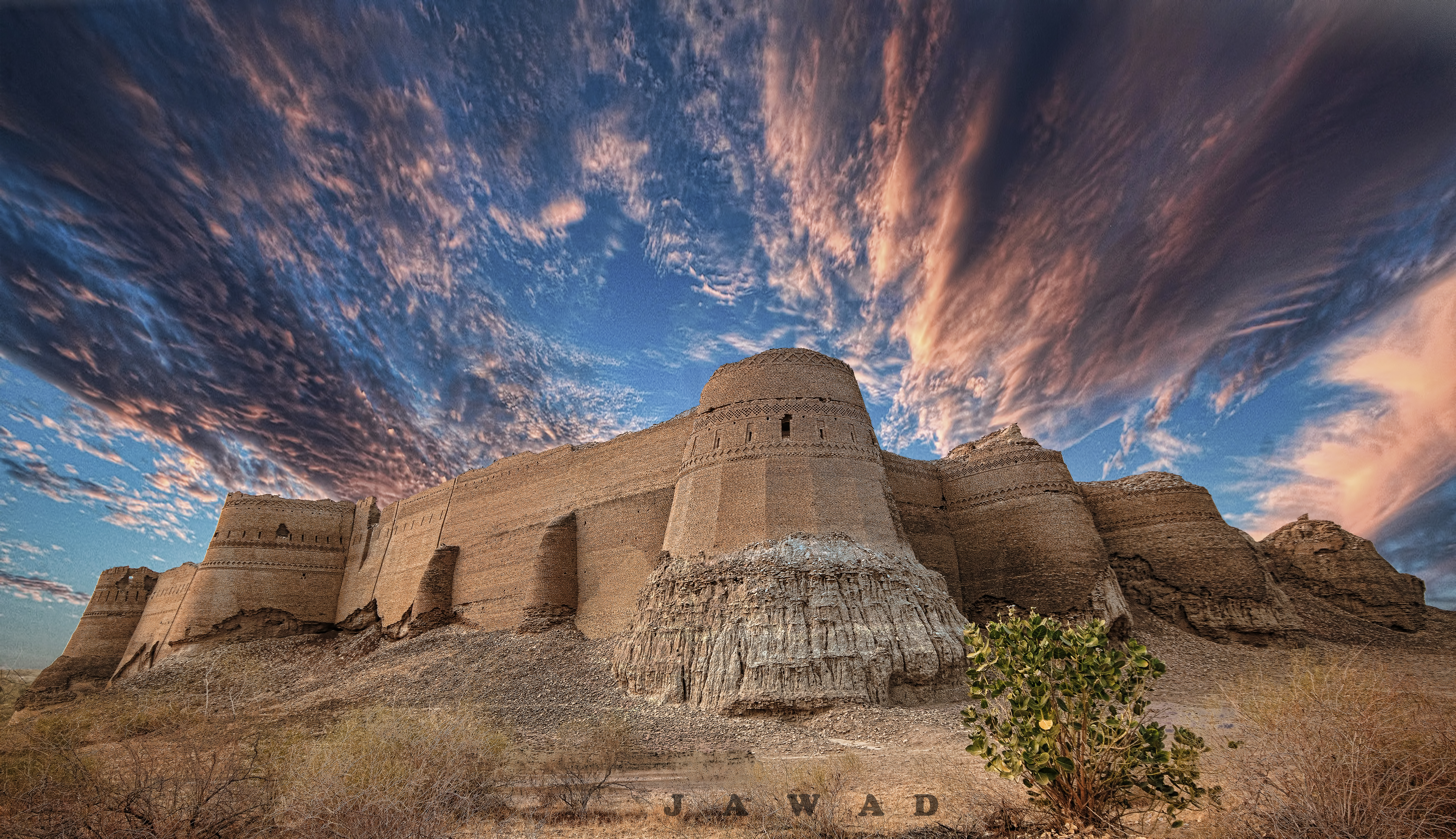
- A view of the fort from outside
- Interactive map of the Islamgarh Fort قلعہ اسلام گڑھ area
- Former names: Bheem War Fort

General information
- Architectural style: Rajput architecture
- Location: Khanpur, Punjab, Pakistan
- Coordinates: 27°51′18″N 70°48′28″E
- Year built: 1665

Islamgarh Fort (Urdu: قلعہ اسلام گڑھ), previously known as Bheem War Fort, is a fort situated in the Cholistan Desert, Pakistan.

== History ==
Islamgarh Fort was built in 1665 during the reign of Raja Rawal Siri Bheem Singh, A Hindu Rajput King of Jaisalmer. The construction materials for the fort were sourced from Jaisalmer, India, and included locally made bricks.

Originally named Bheem War Fort, it was conquered and renamed Islam Garh Fort by Ikhtiar Khan Sund-i-Elahi in 1780, who also built a mosque inside the fort. The fort later fell into the hands of Nawab Muhammad Mubarak Khan II after a victorious battle against Khan.
