= Bhagwant Singh Ju Deo =

Heir-apparent of Orchha

- Raja Bahadur
- Died: December 1920
- Issue: Vir Singh Ju Deo; Karan Singh Ju Deo; Jayanendra Singh Ju Deo; Mahendra Singh Ju Deo; Saraswati Devi
- House: Orchha
- Dynasty: Bundela
- Father: Pratap Singh Ju Deo

Bhagwant Singh Ju Deo was son and heir-apparent of Pratap Singh Ju Deo, the Maharaja of Orchha.

== Early life, family, and education ==
He was born as the eldest son of Pratap Singh Ju Deo. He married thrice. He married firstly into the Panwar family of Janharia in Datia. Secondly, on 25 December 1897, he married secretly a daughter of the Thakore of Wadhwan. His father disapproved of this marriage, and he consequently had to live outside Orchha. It was only in December 1902, after he was able to calm his father, that he was permitted to return to the state. He married thirdly a daughter of Padam Singh of Jubbal. He had four sons from his second wife: Vir Singh Ju Deo, Karan Singh Ju Deo, Jayanendra Singh Ju Deo, and Mahendra Singh Ju Deo. He also had one daughter named Saraswati Devi. His daughter married Yashodar Singh, the Raja of Khilchipur, in 1937. He accompanied his father to the Delhi Durbar of 1903. He also accompanied his father to attend the Delhi Durbar of 1911. On that occasion, his son Vir served as page to George V, and Karan served as page to Lord Hardinge..

== Death ==
He died in December 1920.

== Title ==
- Raja Bahadur Bhagwant Singh Ju Deo of Orchha
