= Chanderi District =

District in India

Coordinates: 24°43′N 78°08′E

Chanderi District चंदेरी जिला
- District of British India
- 1844–1861
- Flag
- Capital: Lalitpur
- History
  - Ceded to the British by Maharaja Jayajirao Sindhia of Gwalior: 1844
  - Western part returned to Gwalior; eastern part renamed Lalitpur district: 1861
Preceded by	Succeeded by
Gwalior State	Gwalior State; Lalitpur district, India

Chanderi District was a former administrative district of British India. It covered most of present-day Lalitpur district of Uttar Pradesh state and the eastern portion of Ashoknagar District of Madhya Pradesh state.

== History ==
Before 1811, the district was the state of Chanderi, and ruled by Bundela Rajputs descended from the kings of Orchha. Chanderi was annexed in 1811 by Maharaja Daulat Rao Sindhia of neighboring Gwalior in 1811. In 1844, the district was ceded to the British by Maharaja Jayajirao Sindhia of Gwalior, and the revenue from the district used to maintain a British force in Gwalior. Lalitpur was the administrative headquarters of the district.

The district was captured by rebels during the Indian Rebellion of 1857, and was not recaptured by the British until late in 1858. The portion of the district west of the Betwa River, including the town of Chanderi, was returned to Gwalior in 1861, and the portion east of the Betwa was renamed Lalitpur District.

The British district of Lalitpur (1861-1891) had an area of 5,043 km^{2} and a population of 294,088 in 1881. The main towns were Lalitpur (pop. 10,684 in 1881 and the only municipality) and Talbahat (5,293), the capitals of the two tehsils in which the district was divided. In 1891 Lalitpur district was merged into Jhansi district. In 1974 it was reestablished as the Lalitpur District of Uttar Pradesh.

== See also ==
- Saugor and Nerbudda Territories
- Jean Baptiste Filose
