= Lalitpur district, India =

District in Uttar Pradesh, India

Lalitpur district
- District
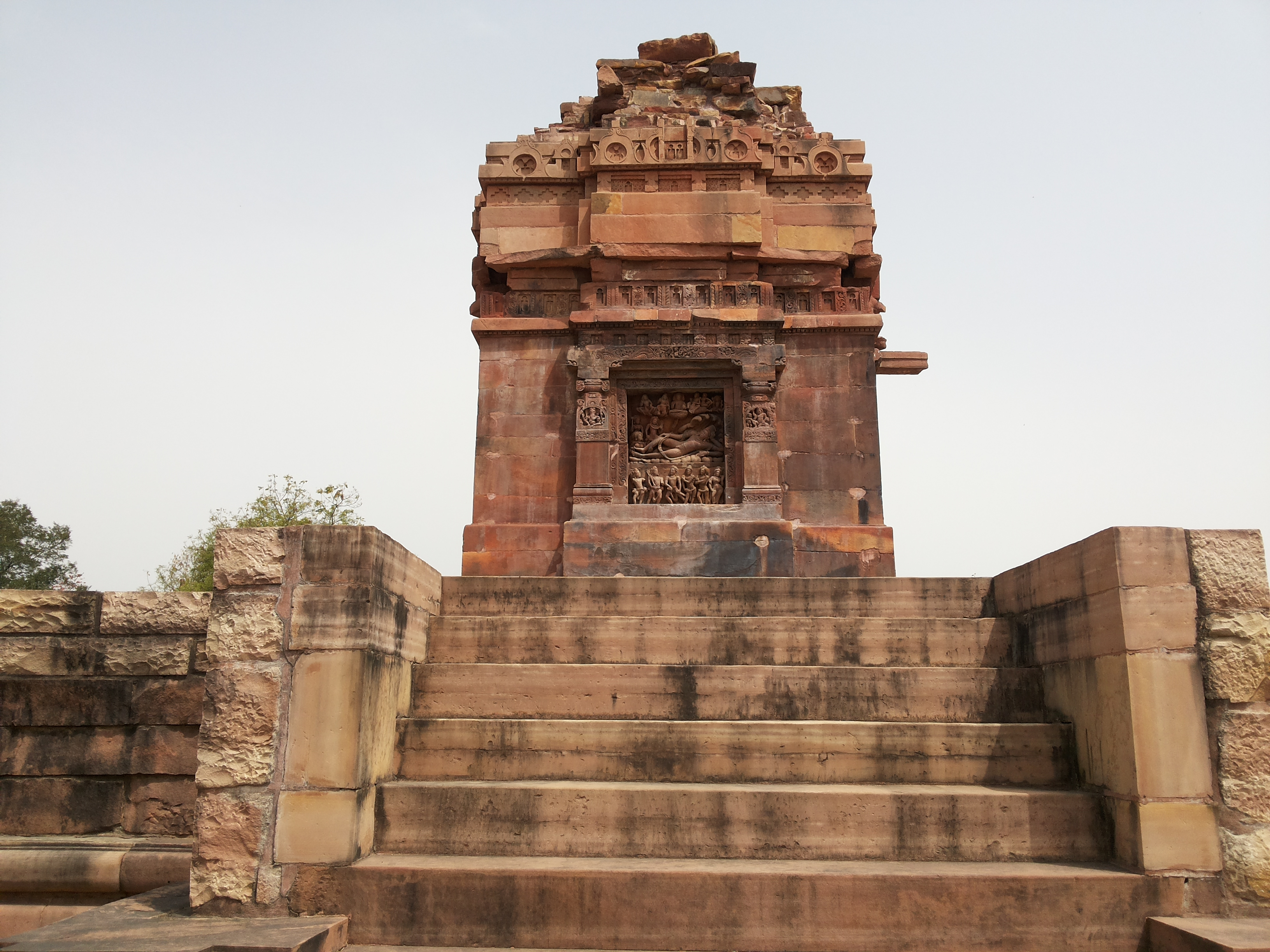
- Dashavatara Temple in Deogarh

- Location of Lalitpur district in Uttar Pradesh
- Coordinates (Lalitpur, India): 24.69°N 78.41°E
- Country: India
- State: Uttar Pradesh
- Division: Jhansi
- Headquarters: Lalitpur

Government
  - District Magistrate: Akshay Tripathi, IAS
  - Lok Sabha constituency: Jhansi

Area
  - Total: 5,039 km^{2} (1,946 sq mi)

Population (2011)
  - Total: 1,221,592
  - Density: 242.4/km^{2} (627.9/sq mi)

Demographics
  - Literacy: 64.95%
  - Sex ratio: 906/1000
- Time zone: UTC+05:30 (IST)
- Vehicle registration: UP-94
- Website: lalitpur.nic.in

Lalitpur district is one of the 75 districts in the northern Indian state of Uttar Pradesh. Lalitpur district is a part of Jhansi Division. Lalitpur is the main town and administrative headquarters. The district occupies an area of 5,039 km^{2}.

Lalitpur district is a part of Jhansi Division and was carved out as a district in the year 1974. It is connected to Jhansi district by a narrow corridor to the northeast, and is otherwise almost surrounded by Madhya Pradesh state, an example of a salient.

Lalitpur district lies between latitude 24°11' and 25°14' (north) and longitude 78°10' and 79°0' (east) and is bounded by district Jhansi in the north, districts Sagar and Tikamgarh of Madhya Pradesh state in the east and Ashoknagar district of Madhya Pradesh separated by river Betwa in the west. The district had a population of 1,221,592 as per the census of year 2011.

This district has a number of historical and cultural places like Deogarh, Seeronji, Pavagiri, Devamata, Neelkantheshwar at Pali, Chawan near Bant(Pali), and Machkund ki Gufa. Lalitpur also has a variety of places like many Hindu & Jain temples. Raghunathji (Bada Mandir), Kali Bauaa Ji Mandir, Shivalay, Boodhe Babba (Hanumanji), Tuvan Mandir for Hindus & Bada Mandir, Ata Mandir & Kshetrapalji for Jains are some famous temples.

== Geography ==
The district forms a portion of the hill country of Bundelkhand, sloping down from the outliers of the Vindhya Range on the south to the tributaries of the Yamuna River on the north. The extreme south is composed of parallel rows of long and narrow-ridged hills. Through the intervening valleys the rivers flow down over ledges of granite or quartz. North of the hilly region, the granite chains gradually turn into clusters of smaller hills.Lalitpur itself holds an important place in the field of minerals. There is availability of granite, maurum, pyrophyllite, sandstone, sand stone besides many other minerals. Above all, after rock-phosphate, the evidence of the presence of iron ore, gold and platinum deposits has been found here. The Betwa River forms the northern and western boundary of the district, and most of the district lies within its watershed. The Jamni River, a tributary of the Betwa, forms the eastern boundary. The Dhasan River forms the district's southeastern boundary, and the southeastern portion of the district lies within its watershed.

The district is now facing a secessionist movement originated in southern Uttar Pradesh and northern Madhya Pradesh to create a separate state of Bundelkhand, as this area is traditionally called by locals.

=== Climate ===
The climate of the district is sub-tropical, which is characterised by a very hot dry summer and a cold winter. Similar to other districts of the Bundelkhand region, this district also has four distinct seasons in a year. The summer season is from March to mid-June, the southwest monsoon is from mid-June to September. Post-monsoonal transition between October and November months constitute the post-monsoon season and the winter season lasts from December to February.

== History ==
The territory of the present-day Lalitpur district was part of the state of Chanderi, founded in the 17th century by a Bundela Rajput who was descended from Rudra Pratap Singh of Orchha. Chanderi, along with most of Bundelkhand, came under Maratha hegemony in the 18th century. Daulat Rao Sindhia of neighboring Gwalior annexed Chanderi state in 1812. In 1844, the former state of Chanderi was ceded to the British, and became the Chanderi District of British India, with Lalitpur town as the district headquarters. The British lost the district in the Indian Rebellion of 1857, and it was not reconquered until late 1858. In 1861, the portion of the district west of the Betwa, including Chanderi, was returned to Gwalior state, and the remainder was renamed Lalitpur district. It became a part of Jhansi district from 1891 to 1974. In 1974, the district was carved out from Jhansi district.

== Economy ==
In 2006 the Ministry of Panchayati Raj named Lalitpur one of the country's 250 most backward districts (out of a total of 640). It is one of the 34 districts in Uttar Pradesh currently receiving funds from the Backward Regions Grant Fund Programme (BRGF).

Lalitpur Thermal Power Station, Lalitpur Solar Power Plant And Altratech Cement like industrial unit are located in Lalitpur District.

== Divisions ==
Lalitpur is divided into five tehsils, Lalitpur, Mehroni, Talbehat, Madawara and Pali; four towns, Lalitpur, Mehroni, Talbehat, and Pali; and 754 villages. The district magistrate is Mr. Yogendra shukla, IAS and the Superintendent of police is Mr. Mirza manzar beg, IPS, and the District Information Officer is Murlidhar Singh.

There are two Uttar Pradesh Vidhan Sabha constituencies in this district: Lalitpur and Mehroni. Both of these are part of Jhansi Lok Sabha constituency. At present, Ram Ratan Kushwaha is the MLA from Lalitpur constituency and Mannu Kori is the MLA from Mehroni constituency. At present chairman of Nagar Palika Parishad Lalitpur is Mrs. Sarla Jain and chairman of Talbehat Nagar Panchayat is Mr. Puneet singh Parihar .

== Demographics ==
Historical population
Year	Pop.	±% p.a.
1901	237,112	—
1911	260,137	+0.93%
1921	234,309	−1.04%
1931	265,258	+1.25%
1941	297,660	+1.16%
1951	314,354	+0.55%
1961	372,995	+1.73%
1971	436,920	+1.59%
1981	577,648	+2.83%
1991	752,043	+2.67%
2001	977,734	+2.66%
2011	1,221,592	+2.25%

Religions in Lalitpur district (2011)
Religion	Percent
Hinduism	95.27%
Islam	2.76%
Jainism	1.67%
Other or not stated	0.30%
Distribution of religions

According to the 2011 census Lalitpur district, Uttar Pradesh has a population of 1,221,592, roughly equal to the nation of Bahrain or the US state of New Hampshire. This gives it a ranking of 391st in India (out of a total of 640). The district has a population density of 242 inhabitants per square kilometre (630/sq mi) . Its population growth rate over the decade 2001-2011 was 24.57%. Lalitpur has a sex ratio of 905 females for every 1000 males, and a literacy rate of 64.95%. 14.36% of the population lives in urban areas. Scheduled Castes and Scheduled Tribes make up 19.69% and 5.86% of the population respectively. The tribals in the district are the Saharias.

Languages of Lalitpur district (2011)
1. Hindi (81.6%)
2. Bundeli (17.5%)
3. Others (0.89%)

At the time of the 2011 Census of India, 81.60% of the population in the district spoke Hindi and 17.51% Bundeli as their first language.

== Transport ==
The city is well connected by railways and road transport.

=== Railways ===
Lalitpur Junction railway station falls under main railway line of India. It is well connected by train services to all parts of the country. Daily trains are available to Mumbai, Delhi, Kolkata (Howrah), Chen nai, Agra, Jammu Tawi, Bangalore (Bengaluru), Trivendrum, Indore, Ahmedabad, Pune, Jammu, Lucknow, Bhopal, Jabalpur, Kanpur and other major towns. Lalitpur station is a junction now, with trains directly to Khajuraho, Singrauli, Satna & Tikamgarh.

=== Road transport ===
India's biggest national highway from Kashmir to Kanyakumari NH-44 passes through Lalitpur, connecting major cities of India. Bus facility to major cities - Kanpur, Jhansi, Agra, Gwalior, Indore, Bhopal, Sagar, Panna.

== See also ==
- Lalitpur Thermal Power Station
- List of Monuments of National Importance in Lalitpur district, India
