= Pratap Singh Judeo =

Maharaja of Orchha from 1874 to 1930

Pratap Singh
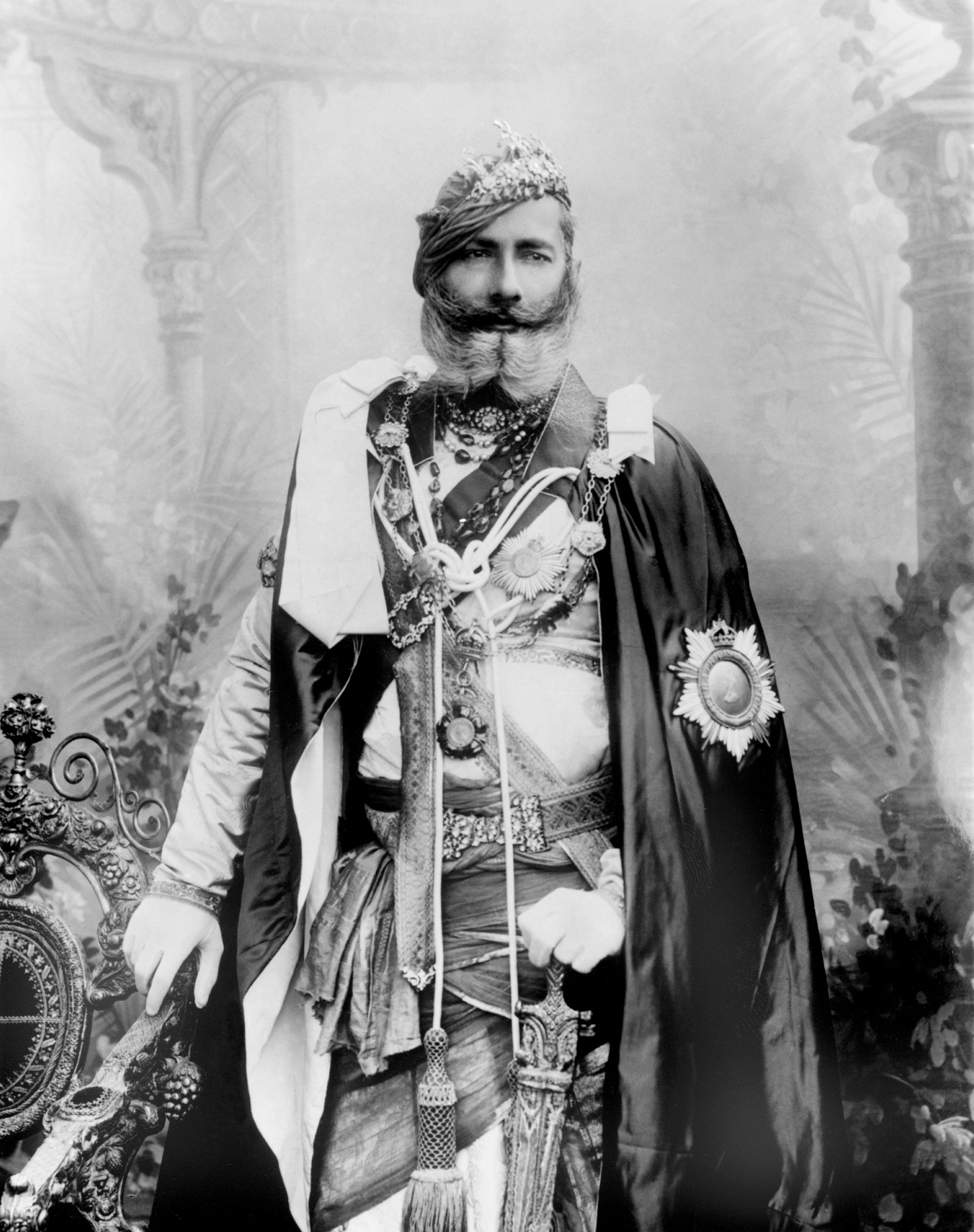

Maharaja of Orchha
- Reign: 15 March 1870 – 3 March 1930
- Predecessor: Hamir Singh
- Successor: Vir Singh Ju Deo
- Born: 3 July 1854
- Died: 3 March 1930 (aged 75)
- Issue: Bhagwant Singh; Sawant Singh
Names
- Pratap Singh Ju Deo
- House: Orchha
- Dynasty: Bundela
- Father: Sujan Singh II

Pratap Singh Ju Deo was the Maharaja of Orchha (in Bundelkhand) from 1874 until his death in 1930.

== Early life and family ==
He was born on 3 July 1854 to Sujan Singh II. He married and had three children: two sons and a daughter. His eldest son, Bhagwant Singh, predeceased him in 1920. His younger son, Sawant Singh, was adopted by Bhan Pratap Singh, the Maharaja of Bijawar, and succeeded his adoptive father in June 1900. His daughter married Vishwanath Singh, the Maharaja of Chhatrapur, in 1884 and died in 1921.

== Reign ==
After the death of his brother, Hamir Singh, in March 1874, he became the Maharaja of Orchha. On this occasion, the British government sent Major A. Mayne to temporarily oversee the administration of the state. On 4 June 1874, Pratap took over the administration, and the British officer was withdrawn in May 1876. He took a great interest in girls' education and established a girls' school in 1875, the first of its kind in Bundelkhand. He established a series of schools throughout his dominions, where education was provided free of cost. Books were also distributed at no charge, and the state covered students' expenses when they appeared for university examinations. In 1876, he established regular courts of justice and organized the police force. He abolished all transit duties in Orchha in 1880. In 1895, he established a postal system in Orchha. During the Indian famine of 1896–1897, he worked tirelessly to provide famine relief. The famine relief efforts cost a total of 1,300,000 rupees. The women who observed purdah were given suitable work. Those who could not work received grains daily from the state granaries. He combated the famine of 1905 with the same zeal. He attended the Delhi durbars of 1877, 1903, and 1911. At the Durbar of 1911, his grandsons, Vir Singh and Karan Singh, were selected to serve as pages to George V and Charles Hardinge, the Governor-General of India, respectively. During his state entry into Delhi for the Delhi durbar of 1911, he was accompanied by his eldest son, Pritchard, the Political Agent in Bundelkhand, and the Madur-ul-Maham. His procession included a cavalry escort, richly caparisoned state horses, spearmen, mace-bearers, chhata (transl. umbrella), suraj-mukhi (transl. sun-face), pankha (transl. fan) and bearers carrying Ganges water. There was also a silver and gold palanquin, chanwars (transl. yak tail whiskers), morchals (transl. peacock feather whiskers), aftaba, pandan (transl. betel nut box), itardan (transl. bottle used to hold attar), and other paraphernalia. His mounted personal attendants wore elaborate gold embroidery, and he was followed by the Raja of Dhar. In 1924, he celebrated the golden jubilee of his reign by opening schools, remitting taxes, introducing the Gajshahi rupee, and constructing a Jubilee Hall in the palace. He settled 217 villages, excavated 73 tanks, and dug 7,086 wells. This significantly improved people's lives and increased agricultural productivity. He constructed several buildings and architectural structures.

== Death ==
He died on 3 March 1930 and was succeeded by his grandson, Vir Singh.

== Titles, styles, salute and honours ==
=== Titles and styles ===
In 1882, the Government of India conferred upon him the title of Sawai Bahadur and, in 1886, granted him the hereditary title of Saramad-i-Rajah-i-Bundelkhand. He also held the titles Bharat Dharma Ratnakar and Yog Vidya Vinod. His titles were:

- His Highness Saramad-i-Rajah-i-Bundelkhand Mahendra Maharaja Sawai Sir Pratap Singh Ju Deo Bahadur, Bharat Dharma Ratnakar, Yog Vidya Vinod, Maharaja of Orchha.

=== Salute ===
As the ruler of Orchha, he was entitled to a fifteen-gun salute. However, the Government of India later increased it to seventeen as a personal distinction.

=== Honours ===
He was appointed GCIE in 1898 and GCSI in 1906. He was made KCB in 1901. The University of Oxford conferred upon him an honorary Doctorate of Civil Law in 1911.
