= Lalitpur District =

Lalitpur District may refer to:

- Lalitpur District, India, a district in Uttar Pradesh, India
- Lalitpur District, Nepal, a district in the Bagmati Province, Nepal
