= Neelkantheshwar =

Hindu temple in Uttar Pradesh, India

Neelkantheshwar is a famous Hindu temple dedicated to Lord Shiva in the Green Mountainous region of Northern India. The idol of Lord Shiva is unique in that it has three heads, and is considered to be one of the Avatar of Lord Shiva. The temple is located in the town of Pali, Lalitpur in Lalitpur district of Uttar Pradesh, India.

People living in surrounding area believe that the idol came out its own from the mountain and the temple was built around it. There is a very huge fair (Mela) every year during the Maha Shivaratri festival. This day is considered to be the day Lord Shiva married Goddess Parvati. A procession of devotees can be witnessed on this day.
