= Chanderi =

Chanderi Chedi
- Town
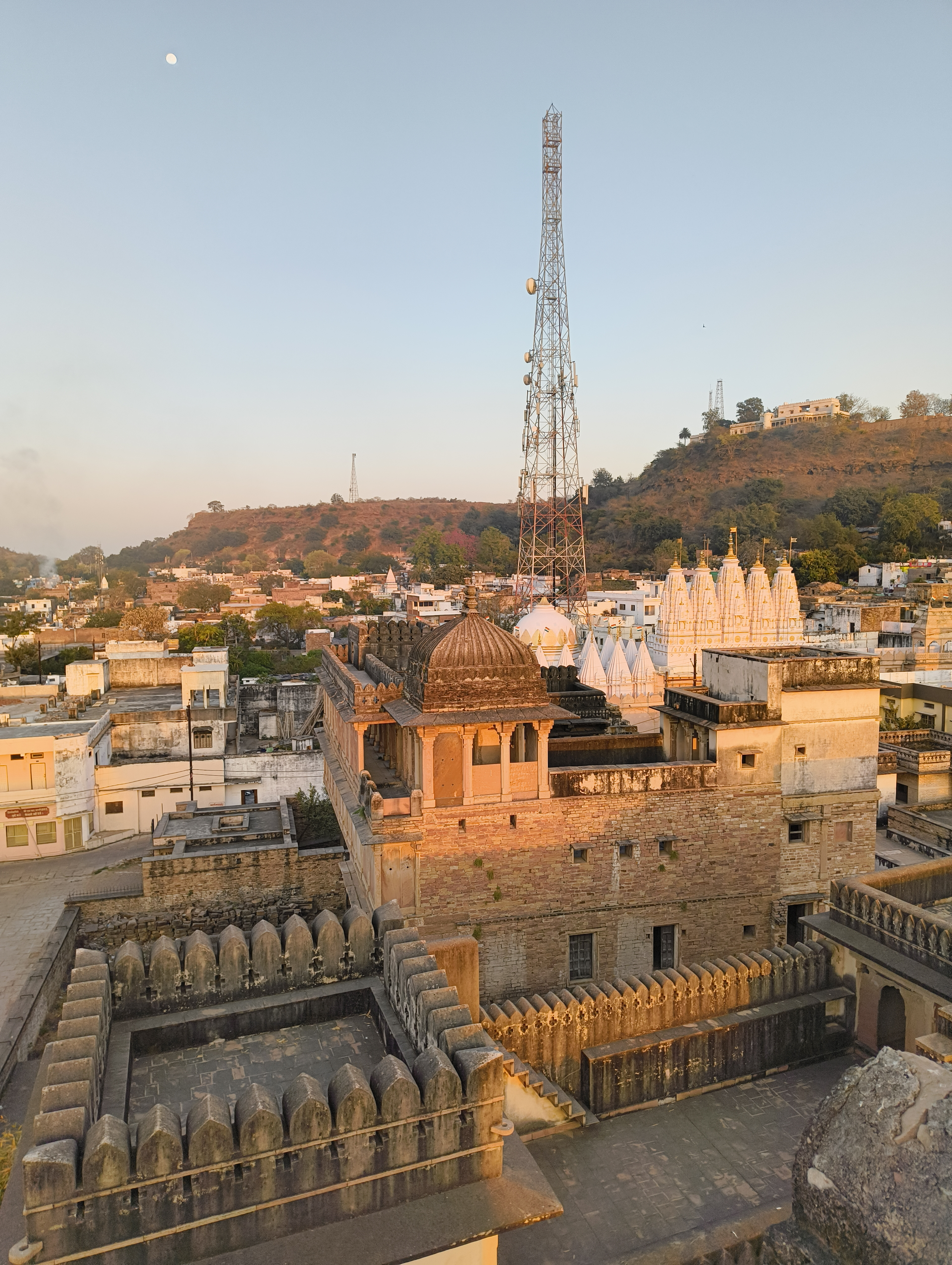
- General view of Chanderi with Raja Rani Mahal, radio tower, Choubisi Jain temple and Kirti Durg

- Location in Madhya Pradesh, India Chanderi (India)
- Coordinates: 24.72°N 78.13°E
- Country: India
- State: Madhya Pradesh
- Division: Gwalior
- District: Ashoknagar
- Region: Gwalior Chambal
- Established: 11th century
- Founded by: Raja Shishupal (mentioned in Mahabharata)
- Named after: Chedi Kingdom

Government
  - Type: City Municipality Board

Area
  - Total: 10.7 km^{2} (4.1 sq mi)
- Elevation: 456 m (1,496 ft)

Population (2011)
  - Total: 33,081
  - Rank: 3rd in Ashoknagar District
  - Density: 3,090/km^{2} (8,010/sq mi)

Languages
  - Official: Bundeli, Hindi
- Time zone: UTC+5:30 (IST)
- Postal code: 473446
- Telephone code: 07547
- Vehicle registration: MP 67
- Website: chanderi.nic.in

Chanderi, is a town of historical importance in Ashoknagar District of the state Madhya Pradesh in India. It is situated at a distance of 127 km from Shivpuri, 38 km from Lalitpur, 57 km from Ashok Nagar, 348 km from Jhansi and 46 km from Isagarh. It is surrounded by hills southwest of the Betwa River. Chanderi is surrounded by hills, lakes and forests and is spotted with monuments of the Malwa Sultanate and the Bundela Rajputs. It is also famous for ancient Jain Temples. Its population in 2011 was 33,190.

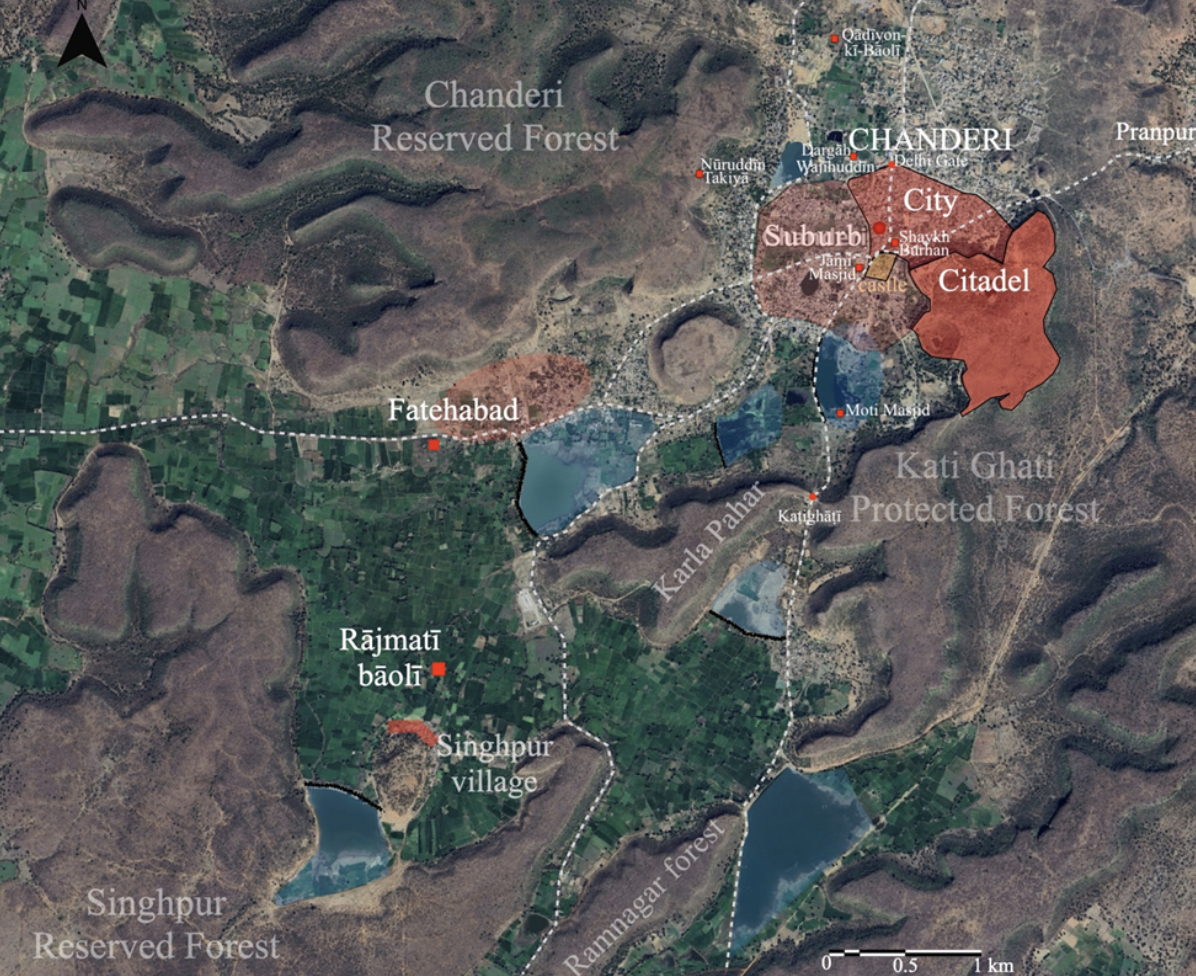
Map of Chanderi and surrounding sites

== History ==
=== Later Pratīhāra rulers ===
in the eleventh and twelfth centuries, Chanderi came under the sway of the later Pratīhāra kings. During this time, Chanderi is mentioned by the Persian scholar Alberuni in 1030.

=== Delhi Sultanate ===
Ghiyas ud din Balban captured the city in 1251 for Nasiruddin Mahmud, Sultan of Delhi.

=== Malwa Sultanate ===
Sultan Mahmud I Khilji of Malwa captured the city in 1438 after a siege of several months. Rana Sanga of Mewar conquer much of the Malwa along with Chanderi and appointed his vassal Medini Rai a rebellious minister of Sultan Mahmud II of Malwa as ruler of Malwa under his lordship. Medini Rai made Chanderi as capital of his kingdom.

=== Mughals ===
In the Battle of Chanderi, the Mughal Emperor Babur captured the fort from Medini Rai and witnessed the macabre Rajput rite of jauhar, in which, faced with certain defeat and in an attempt to escape dishonor in the hands of the enemy, women with children in their arms jumped in a fire pit to commit suicide, which was made for this specific purpose, against the background of vedic hymns recited by the priests. Jauhar was performed during the night and in the morning the men would rub the ashes of their dead women folk on their forehead, don a saffron garment known as kesariya, chew tulsi leaves (in India tulsi leaves are placed in the mouth of a dead body), symbolizing their awareness about impending death and resolve to fight and die with honour. This method of fighting & dying for the cause of retaining honour was called saka. In 1529, Puran Mal defeated Babur's forces and captured Chanderi. In 1542 it was captured by Sher Shah Suri and added to the governorship of Shujaat Khan. The Mughal Emperor Akbar made the city a sarkar in the subah of Malwa.

=== Bundelas and Scindias ===
The Bundela Rajputs captured the city in 1586, and it was held by Ram Sab, a son of Raja Madhukar of Orchha. In 1646 Devi Singh Bundela was made ruler of the city, and Chanderi remained in the hands of his family until it was annexed in 1811 by Jean Baptiste Filose for the Maratha ruler Daulat Rao Sindhia of Gwalior. The city was transferred to the British in 1844. The British lost control of the city during the Revolt of 1857, and the city was recaptured by Hugh Rose on 14 March 1858. Richard Harte Keatinge led the assault, for which he was awarded the Victoria Cross. The city was transferred back to the Sindhias of Gwalior in 1861, and became part of Isagarh District of Gwalior state.

=== Republic of India ===
After India's independence in 1947, Gwalior became the capital of the new state of Madhya Bharat, which was merged into Madhya Pradesh on 1 November 1956.

== Geography ==
Chanderi is located at 24.72°N 78.13°E. It has an average elevation of 456 metres (1496 feet).

== Demographics ==
As of 2001 India census, Chanderi had a population of 28,313. Males constitute 52% of the population and females 48%.

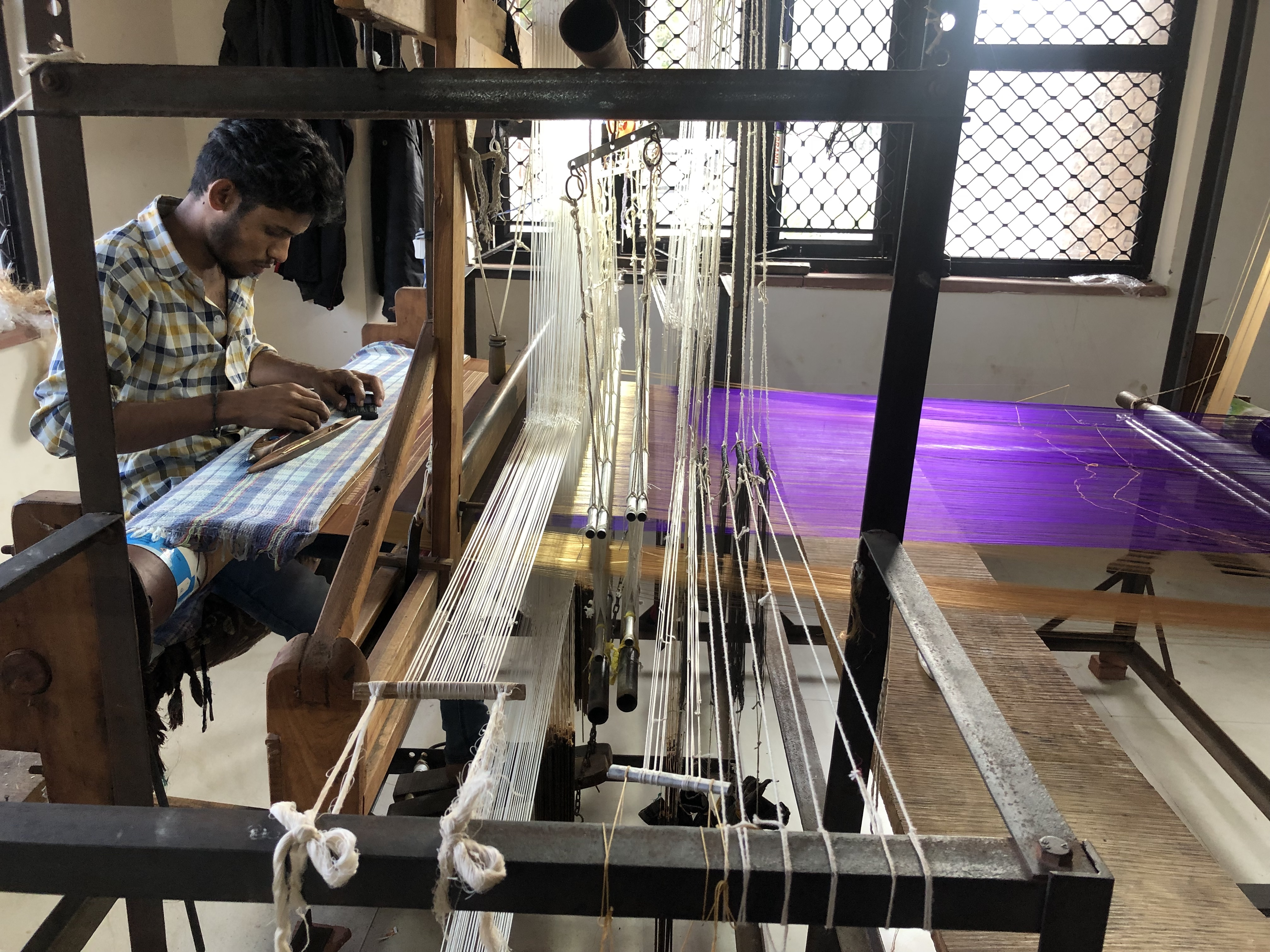
A weaver at work. Chanderi is a famous centre of Sari production

== Access ==
There is a good roadway network in Chanderi. The town lies at State Highway 20 and National Highway 376 with connections to Ashoknagar, Ishagarh, Lalitpur etc.

There is no railway service in or near Chanderi but necessary administrative measures were adopted in 2014 for a line to be operated by Northern Railways on a Pipraigaon-Chanderi-Lalitpur route.

== Jainism at Chanderi ==
The Chanderi area has been a major center of Jain culture. It was a major center of the Parwar Jain community. There are a number of Jain places nearby- Gurilagiri (7 km), Aamanachar (29 km), Bithala (19 km), Bhamon (16 km), Khandargiri (2 km), Thuvanji (22 km) and Bhiyadant (14 km), and Deogarh, Uttar Pradesh (20 km, across the border).

The Jain Bhattarakas of Mula Sangh, Balatkara Gana had a center at Chanderi that flourished for several centuries. The lineage, as constructed by Pt. Phulachandra Shastri is as following:

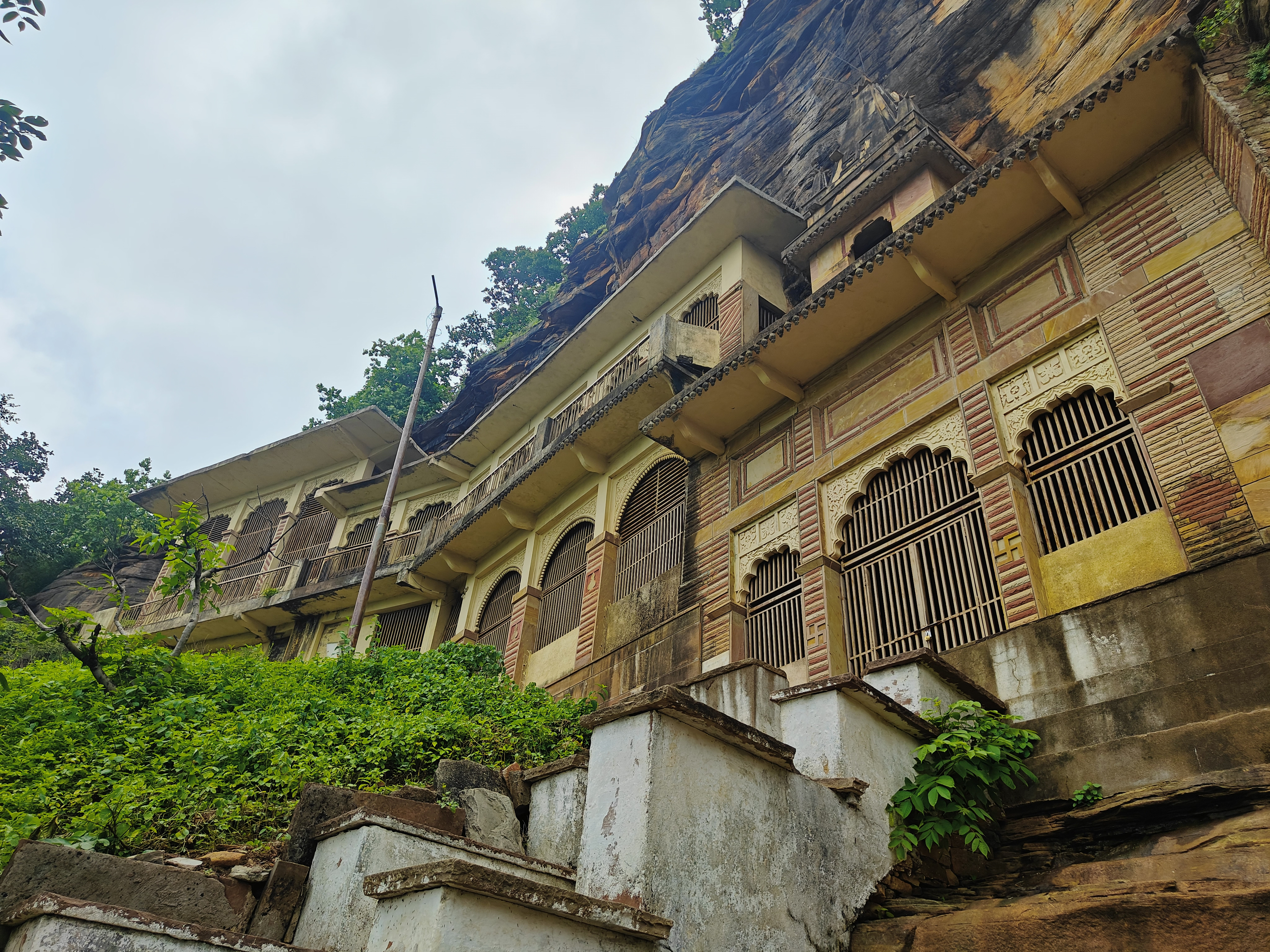
Khandargiri Jain Cave temples

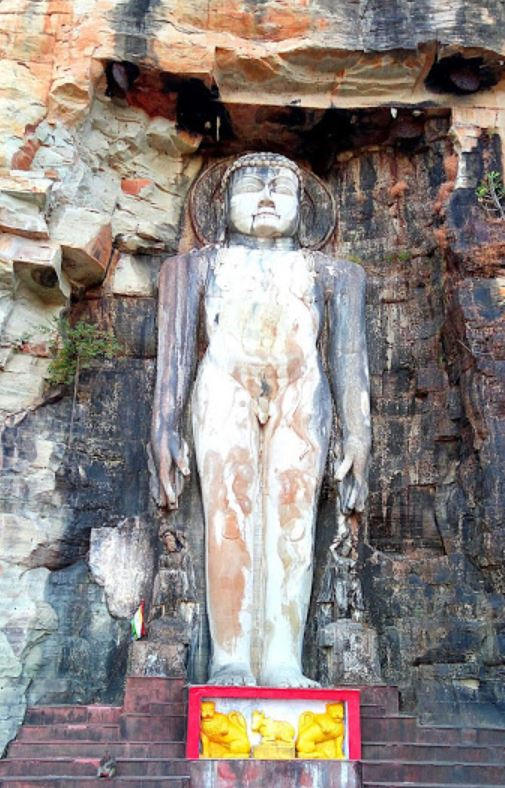
It is a 45 feet tall rock cut murti of the first Jain Tirthankara Rishabhnath, popularly known as Adinath

1. Devendrakirti (see Balatkara Gana), who awarded Singhai title in 1436 CE (see Parwar (Jain))
2. Tribhuvanakirti (anointed in Vikram Samvat 1522),
3. Sasasrakirti
4. Padmanandi
5. Yashahkirti
6. Lalitkirti
7. Dharmakirt
8. Padmakirti (died Vikram Samvat 1717)
9. Sakalakirti
10. Surendrakirti (pratishtha in Vikram Samvat 1746)

A branch of this lineage continued at Sironj.

1. Jagatkirti (pupil of Dharmakirti above)
2. Tribhuvanakirti
3. Narendrakirti
4. Unknown
5. Rajkirti
6. Devendrakirti (pratishtha in samvat 1871)

=== Jain Temples ===
List of Jain temples at Chanderi:

1. Shri Choubeesee Bara Mandir : This temple has 2 parts with front part is known as Bara mandir and back part called Choubeesee mandir. As suggested by inscription this temple was built around year 1293(V.S. 1350). This temple was renovated in 13th to 18th century. This temple has 24 idols for 24 Tirthankars and these idols are made by the stones of actual colors as the Tirthankar. All idols are same in dimensions, which is very difficult in real.
1. Shri Parasnath Digamber Jain Purana mandir Jain temple : It is one of the oldest jain temple in chanderi containing idols of Shri Prasnath ji of 7th century.
1. Shri Khandargiri Jain temple : It is one of the most famous religious site in Chanderi. This temple has a 45 feet carved idol of Rishabhnatha. Inscriptions suggest that this statue is over 700 years old. Six caves have been cut out of the hillside. Inside there are a number of religious carvings of Jain saints and decorations carved into the existing hillside. The oldest cave is cave 6 that dates back to 1236.
2. Shri thobonji Jain temple : This temple belongs to 9th century. Moolnayak of this temple is light blue colored idol colossal of Adinath of height 36 feet 8 inches. The other colossal idols in this temple are Bhagwan ParshVanatha of height 13 feet 4 inches and Bhagwan Parshwanath of height 12 feet 6 inches.
3. Shri Chandraprabha digambar Jain temple : This temple is dedicated to Chandraprabha, the 8th tirthankar of Jainism. Oldest inscription date back to year 967 AD.

== Dargah Makhdoom Shah Wilayat ==
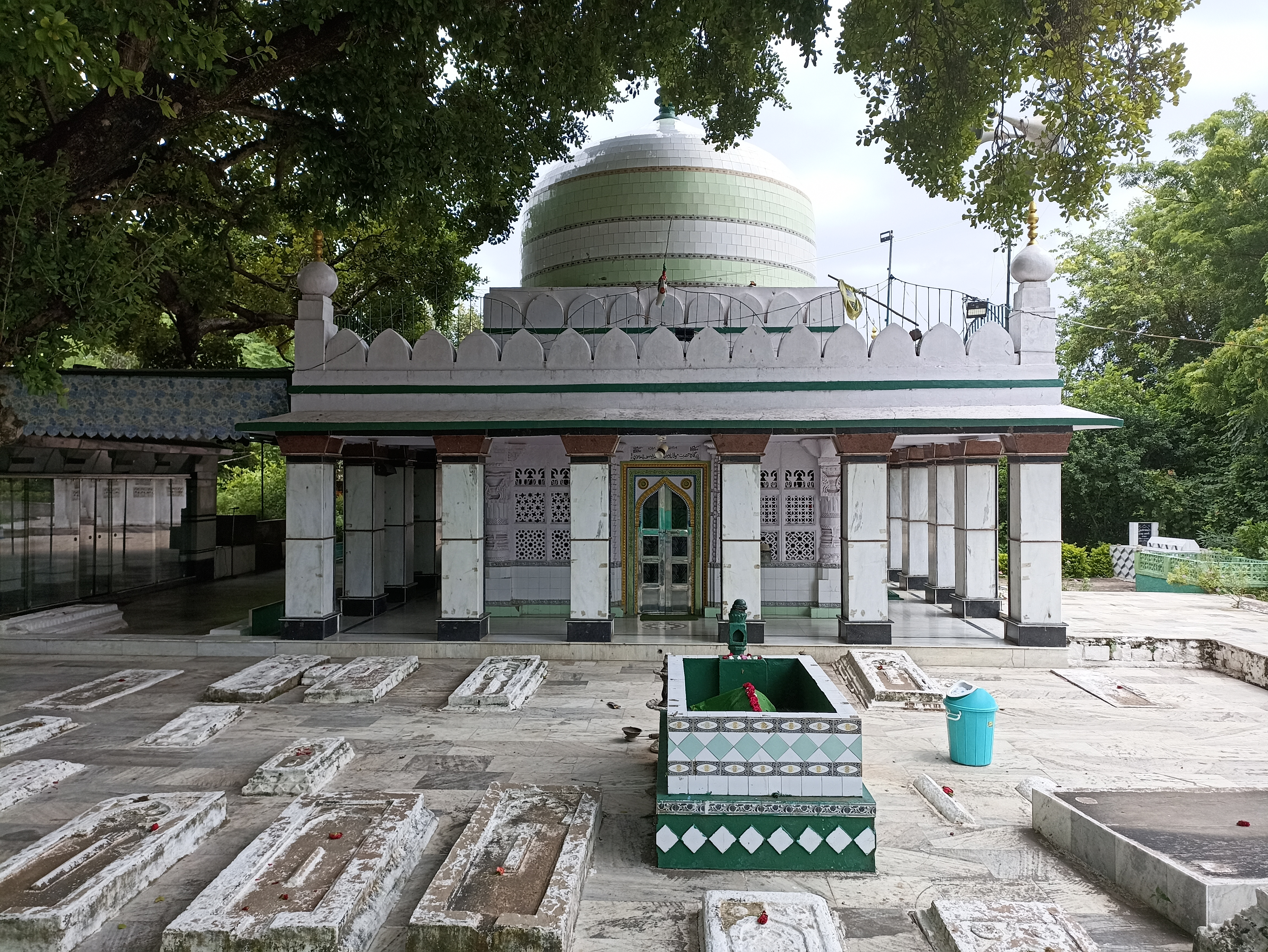
Dargah of Wajihuddin Yusuf (d. 1329), Chanderi

Since the 14th century, Chanderi has been the seat of a Chishti Sufi saint named Mawlānā Wajīh al-Dīn Yūsuf (d. 729/1329), who was a noted disciple of Shaykh Niẓām al-Dīn Awliyā of Delhi (1238–1325) and studied together with Kamāl al-Dīn of Dhār and Mughīth al-Dīn of Ujjain. In 1325, Mawlānā Yūsuf received a tunic and cap that had been worn by Niẓām al-Dīn as an insignia of spiritual succession (khilāfat). Locally revered as Makhdoom Shāh-i Wilāyat, the saint's death anniversary (Urs) is celebrated every year from March 27 to 29, when his devotees flock to the dargah to offer chaadars and pray for the fulfilment of their wishes. In addition to the shaykh's tomb, the dargah complex has a mosque, a residence (khānaqah) and several inscribed cenotaphs, including that of Shaykh Barakat b. Nasib b. Siraj who died on Monday 13 Muharram 924 hijri (25 January 1518).

== In popular culture ==
- Stree – The 2018 horror-comedy film Stree, Starring Rajkummar Rao and Shraddha Kapoor about a vengeful ghost who abducts men at night, is set and shot in the town of Chanderi.
- Sui Dhaaga – Some parts of this Anushka Sharma and Varun Dhawan starrer film were shot in Chanderi. In this film the weaving setup was from Chanderiyaan Chanderi
- Gudiya Humari Sabhi Pe Bhari serial shot in Chanderi, starting with Chanderi Bus stand whose named Lalitpur Bus Adda and background of Kila Kothi.
- Janhit Mein Jaari starring Nushrratt Bharuccha on Zee5 is set in Chanderi with major portions filmed there.
- Stree 2-Sarkate ka Aatank Starring Rajkummar Rao and Shraddha Kapoor is sequel to Stree 2018

== See also ==
- Chanderi sari
- Chanderi District
