= Yashodar Singh =

Raja of Khilchipur 1942/1961

- Raja; Rao Bahadur

Raja of Khilchipur
- Reign: c. 1942 – 25 December 1961
- Predecessor: Durjan Sal Singh
- Successor: Bhartendra Singh
- Born: 6 March 1918
- Died: 25 December 1966 (aged 48)
- Spouse: Saraswati Devi
- Issue Detail: Indu Kumari; Meenakshi Kumari; Jaishree Kumari; Bhartendra Singh
- House: Khilchipur
- Dynasty: Chauhan
- Father: Durjan Sal Singh
- Education: Daly College

Yashodar Singh was the Raja of Khilchipur from 1942 until his death in 1961.

== Early life, family, and education ==
He was born on 6 March 1918 to Durjan Sal Singh, the Raja of Khilchipur, and his wife, a daughter of the Raja of Sailana. He was educated at Daly College, Indore. In 1937, he married Saraswati Devi, the only daughter of Bhagwant Singh Ju Deo and sister of Vir Singh Ju Deo, the Maharaja of Orchha. The couple had three daughters, Indu Kumari, Meenakshi Kumari, Jaishree Kumari, and a son, Bhartendra Singh.

== Reign ==
Upon the death of his father in 1942, he succeeded him as the Raja of Khilichipur. He signed the instrument of accession on 11 August 1947, and by it he acceded his state to the Dominion of India. Later, he, like many of his fellow rulers, signed the covenant at New Delhi to form Madhya Bharat.

== Death ==
He died on 25 December 1961 and was succeeded by Bhartendra Singh to his title, rank and dignity.
