= Vir Singh Judeo =

Maharaja of Orchha from 1930 to 1956

Vir Singh

Maharaja of Orchha
- Reign: 3 March 1930 – 10 October 1956
- Coronation: 4 November 1930
- Predecessor: Pratap Singh Ju Deo
- Successor: Devendra Singh
- Born: 14 April 1899
- Died: 7 October 1956 (aged 57)
- Issue: Devendra Singh; Sudha Kumari
Names
- Vir Singh Ju Deo
Regnal name
- Vir Singh II
- House: Orchha
- Dynasty: Bundela
- Father: Bhagwant Singh Ju Deo

Vir Singh Ju Deo (also spelt Bir Singh Ju Deo) was the Maharaja of Orchha (in Bundelkhand) from 1930 until his death in 1956.

== Early life, family, and education ==
He was born on 14 April 1899 to Bhagwant Singh Ju Deo, the heir apparent of Orchha. He was educated at Daly College in Indore, Rajkumar College in Rajkot, and Mayo College in Ajmer. He received administrative training in the Saugor district, Central Provinces. His father died in December 1920, leaving behind four sons. As the eldest, he was designated the heir apparent to Orchha. He, along with his grandfather, Pratap Singh Ju Deo, his father, and his brother, Karan Singh, attended the Delhi Durbar of 1911, which was held to proclaim George V and Mary as Emperor and Empress of India. On this occasion, he acted as a page to George V. He married twice—first on 4 March 1919 to a sister of the Thakore of Wadhwan, and later to a granddaughter of the Maharaja of Gondal. From his first wife, he had one son, Devendra Singh, born on 6 November 1919. By his second wife, he had a daughter, Sudha Kumari, born on 22 November 1930. She married Ratan Singh of Dhami.

== Reign ==
Upon the death of his grandfather, Pratap Singh Ju Deo, on 3 March 1930, he succeeded him as the Maharaja of Orchha. His coronation took place on 4 November 1930, when R.J.W. Wheel, then Agent to the Governor-general in Central India, installed him on the throne by placing the mukut (transl. crown) on his head. Right after his coronation, he announced the opening of 100 primary schools. In 1930, when the Baghelkhand branch of the Indian National Congress began its agitation to raise public awareness in Bundelkhand, it also influenced the environment in Orchha. As a result, people started opposing feudalism and monarchy. In 1932, during the Shivaratri festival at Kundeshwar, Jawala Singh displayed cartoons—one of which depicted the Vir milking the people, represented as a cow. This portrayal sparked opposition against the monarchy. In 1933, when Chandra Shekhar Azad arrived in Orchha, he intensified efforts to raise public awareness against British rule. As a result, a state servant, Lalaram Bajpai, resigned from his position in Nakedari and joined the Congress. In 1937, when Jawaharlal Nehru was not permitted to halt in Tikamgarh to promote the Congress's electoral cause, it enraged the people against the Vir. He had the state area surveyed. While in Mumbai on 17 December 1946, he announced that he would form a responsible government in his state. Accordingly, on 10 January 1947, he established a responsible cabinet in Orchha. This cabinet, with Rama Shankar Shukla as prime minister, Mankameshwarnath Jutsi as revenue minister, Tribhuvan Kumar Pandey as home minister, and Chaturbhuj Pathak nominated as education and social welfare minister, began its work on 11 January 1947. When India gained independence on 15 August 1947, he, in line with the will of the people, established a responsible government by transferring power to the masses on 17 December 1947. When the covenant for the merger of the states of Bundelkhand and Baghelkhand to form Vindhya Pradesh was finalized, he, along with the other rulers of Bundelkhand, signed it at Nowgong in March 1948.

== Death ==
He died on 7 October 1956. His son, Devendra, was recognized as the Maharaja of Orchha by the Government of India on 21 November 1956.

== Honours ==
He was appointed Knight Commander of the Order of the Star of India in 1936.
