= Pali, Lalitpur =

Pali
- Town
- Location in Uttar Pradesh, India
- Coordinates: 24.48°N 78.42°E
- Country: India
- State: Uttar Pradesh
- District: Lalitpur
- Elevation: 457 m (1,499 ft)

Population (2011)
  - Total: 9,267

Languages
  - Official: Hindi
- Time zone: UTC+5:30 (IST)

Pali is a town and a nagar panchayat in Lalitpur district in the Indian state of Uttar Pradesh.

== Geography ==
Pali is located at 24.48°N 78.42°E. It has an average elevation of 457 metres (1499 feet). It is having a Neelkanth Mahadev Temple in the heart of the city.

== Demographics ==
As of 2011 India census, Pali has a population of 9,267 divided into 10 wards. Male population is 4,830 and that of female is 4,437. Pali has an average literacy rate of 70.77%, higher than state average of 67.68 %, male literacy is 81.65%, and female literacy is 59.06%. In Pali, 15.75% of the population is under 6 years of age. Out of the total population, 3,856 are engaged in work or business activity with 2,460 are males and rest 1,396 are females.

Schedule Caste (SC) and Schedule Tribe (ST) constitutes 15.95% and 4.79% of the total population in Pali. Based on the census 93.02% of the total population are Hindus, 3.57% are Muslims, 3.32% are Jains and the rest is occupied by Christian, Sikh and Buddhist.

== History ==
Old fort of Raja Rao Sahab Bhanupratap Singh judev Bundela.Raosahab Bhanupratap Singh Judev and Chhatrajeet Singh Judev were the "Jageerdar"of pali. .Raosahab Pali donated about 1000 acres of his property to 400 families. Pali was founded by Maharaja Jorawar Singh Judev son of Maharaj Durjan Singh Judev (From Chanderi). Raja Jorawar Singh Judev were two brothers. Raja Man singh Chanderi and Raja Dewaan dhiraj Singh Judev (Gadyana).

== Culture ==
It is also famous because of Devgarh temples. Pali is famous for its deshi pan & Neelkantheshwar temple 3 km away from city on the peak of Vindhyanchal Mountain.

Folk songs of the place are very famous like "Alha" (song about bravery of kings Alha and Udal) derived from Alha-Khand and "Beer Hardol" (song about brother's love.)
