= Durjan Sal Singh =

Raja of Khilchipur (1908 – 1942)

- Raja Rao Bahadur

Raja of Khilchipur
- Reign: c. 1908 – c. 1942
- Predecessor: Bhawani Singh
- Successor: Yashodar Singh
- Spouse: Lakshmi Kanwar
- Issue: Yashodar Singh
- Education: Daly College

Durjan Sal Singh was the Raja of Khilchipur from 1908 until his death in 1942.

== Early life, family, and education ==
He was born on 26 August 1897 to Bhawani Singh, the Raja of Khilchipur. He was educated at the Daly College in Indore. Following which, he underwent a course of administrative training in the Central Provinces. In 1916, he married Lakshmi Kanwar, the third daughter of Jaswant Singh II, the Raja of Sailana. By her, he had a son, Yashodar Singh.

== Reign ==
Upon the death of his father in 1908, he succeeded to his title, rank and dignity as a minor. He was invested with full ruling and administrative powers on 22 February 1918. When he was invited by the British Government to attend the Delhi Durbar of 1911, he declined the invitation due to the financial troubles in his state, and his attendance was accordingly excused. In 1918, he was received by Lord Chelmsford, the then Viceroy and Governor-General of India, at Bhopal. In 1922, he visited Indore to meet Edward VIII, the then Prince of Wales, and attended the durbar that Edward held at Daly College. In 1928, he again visited Indore to meet Viscount Halifax, the then Viceroy and Governor-General of India.

== Death ==
He died in 1942 and was succeeded by Yashodar Singh to his title, rank and dignity.

== Honours ==
He was granted the hereditary title of Raja in 1928. He was created a Knight Commander of the Order of the Indian Empire in 1937.
