= Chanderi sari =

Type of silk sari

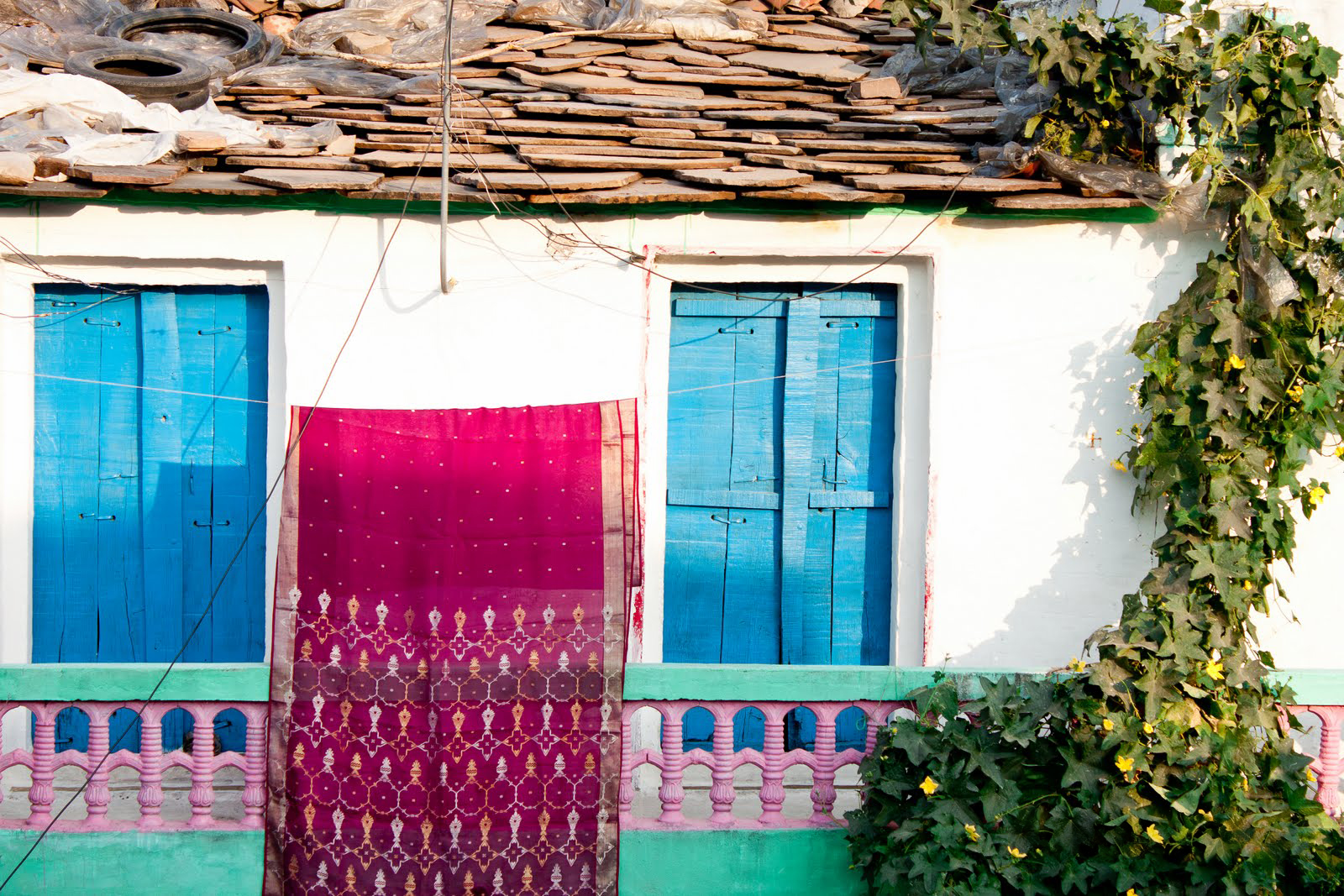
- A Chanderi sari outside a home in Pranpur
- Type: Sari
- Material: Silk or cotton
- Place of origin: Chanderi, Madhya Pradesh, India

The Chanderi sari is a traditional silk sari made in Chanderi, Madhya Pradesh, India.

== History ==
The weaving culture of Chanderi emerged between the 2nd and 7th centuries. It is situated on the boundary of two cultural regions of the state, Malwa and Bundelkhand. The people of the Vindhyachal Ranges have a wide range of traditions. In the 11th century, the trade locations Malwa, Medwa, central India, and south Gujarat increased the region's importance.

The Chanderi sari tradition began in the 13th century Around 1350 by Koli weavers.

== Themes and motifs ==
Chanderi saris are produced from three kinds of fabric: pure silk, Chanderi cotton and silk cotton. Traditional coin, floral art, peacocks and modern geometric designs are woven into different Chanderi patterns. The saris are among the finest in India and are known for their gold and silver brocade or zari, fine silk, and opulent embroidery.

== See also ==
- Banarasi sari
- Ilkal saree
- Mysore silk
