= Jean Baptiste Filose =

Jean Baptiste Filose was a military commander in the army of Daulat Rao Sindhia, the Maratha ruler of Gwalior. In 1811 he captured the fortress of Chanderi on the eastern border of Sindhia's kingdom from the Bundela Rajput rulers. He led Sindhia's forces against British during the Third Anglo-Maratha War (1817–1818), and captured the fortress of Garha Kota near Sagar in 1817.

In 1841, Jean Baptiste Filose, Colonel and Sardar in the services of Maharaja Scindia, permitted a Catholic school to be established in his property at Jamuna Bagh, Agra. A few years later, he made a donation of one lakh rupees, then a fabulous amount, for the construction of a new Catholic school for boys in Agra. The foundation stone was laid in 1846 by Major O'Gorman of the East India Company. This school was named St. Peter's College and continues today in Agra.
