= Lalitpur Thermal Power Station =

Thermal power plant in the Lalitpur district, Uttar Pradesh

- Country: India
- Location: Lalitpur, Uttar Pradesh
- Coordinates: 24°47′51″N 78°38′46″E
- Status: Operational
- Commission date: 2015
- Owner: Bajaj Energy
- Operator: Bajaj Hindusthan Limited

Thermal power station
- Primary fuel: Coal

Power generation
- Units operational: 3
- Nameplate capacity: 1980 MW

External links
- Website: www.lpgcl.com

Lalitpur Power Generation Company Limited is a coal-based thermal power plant located in Mahroni Tehsil in Lalitpur district, Uttar Pradesh. The power plant is owned by Bajaj Hindusthan Limited. Bharat Heavy Electricals is executing the project.

== Capacity ==
The planned capacity of the power plant in 1980 MW.

Stage	Unit Number	Capacity (MW)	Date of Commissioning
1st	1	660	Commissioned June 2015
1st	2	660	Commissioned Jan 2016
1st	3	660	Commissioned June 2016
