= Rudra Pratap Singh =

Raja of Orchha from 1501 to 1531

Rudra Pratap Singh Bundela
- Raja

Raja of Orchha
- Reign: 1501–1531
- Successor: Bharatichand
- Dynasty: Bundela

Rudra Pratap Singh Bundela (r. 1501–1531) was the founder and first Raja of the Kingdom of Orchha (which was in the broder region known as Bundelkhand). His name is sometimes spelled Rudrapratap Singh and his last name, Bundela, is often omitted.

He reigned between 1501 and 1531, during which time he built the fort at what is now the town of Orchha, on the banks of the river Betwa. He moved his capital from Garh Kundar to that town in 1531 and died in the same year.
