= Khilchipur State =

Princely state of India

Coordinates: 24.03°N 76.57°E

Khilchipur State खिलचीपुर रियासत
- Princely State
- 1544–1948
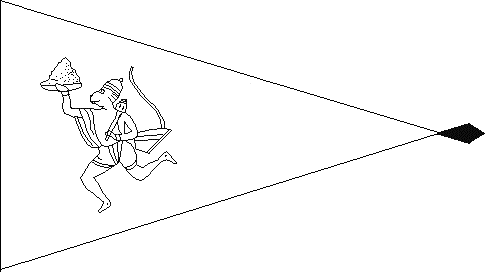
- Flag

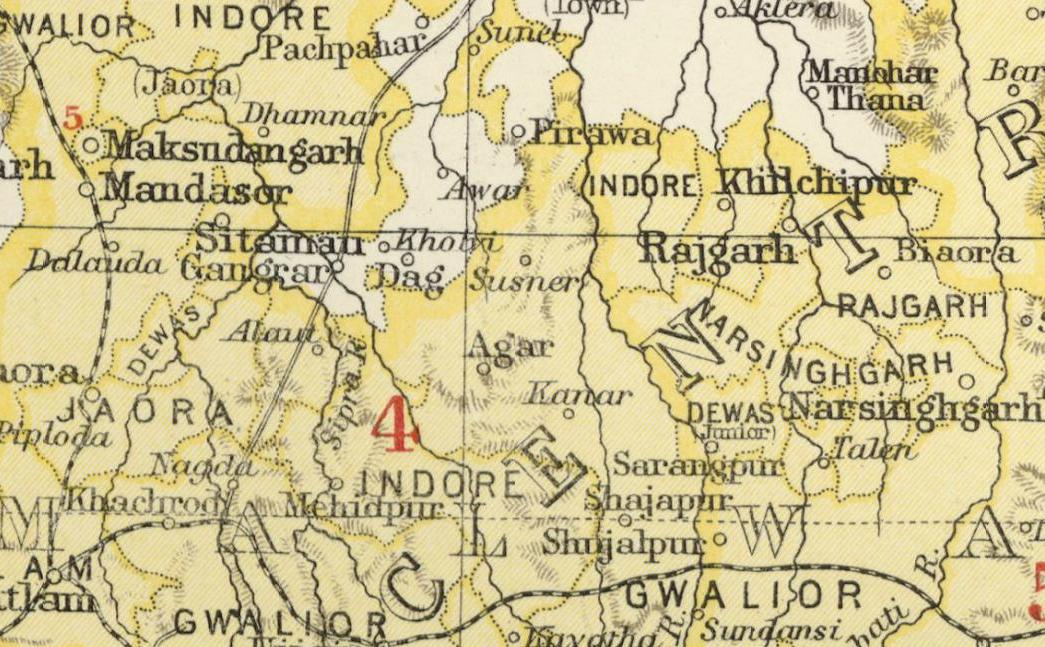
- Khilchipur State in the Imperial Gazetteer of India
- Area
  - 1901 Census of India: 710 km^{2} (270 sq mi)
- Population
  - 1901 Census of India: 31,143
- History
  - Established: 1544
  - Accession to the Union of India: 1948
Succeeded by
India
- Indian princely states

Khilchipur State was a 9 gun salute princely state in India. The seat was in Khilchipur, Rajgarh district, Madhya Pradesh. It had an area of 710 square kilometres (273 sq mi), and a population of 31,143 in 1901. Its estimated revenue in 1901 was Rs.1,14,000.

== History ==
Founded in 1544 by Dewan Ugra Sen, who was forced by family dissensions to migrate from the Khichi capital of Gagraun. A grant of land was subsequently made to him by the Mughal Emperor, which included the adjoining Zirapur and Machalpur parganas, later conquered by Indore State, and Shujalpur, later in Gwalior State. Khilchipur State became a prey to the attack of the Maharaja Scindia of Gwalior, in A.D. 1770 when Abhai Singh, the Ruler of Khilchipur was obliged to make terms with Mahadaji Sindhia and became his tributary. Khilchipur was formerly the capital of this princely state, under the Bhopal Agency of British India's Central India Agency. The rulers acceded to the Government of India after India's independence in 1947, and the Khilchipur became part of the new state of Madhya Bharat. Madhya Bharat was merged into Madhya Pradesh on 1 November 1956.

== Rulers ==
The rulers of Khilchipur were titled "Rao Bahadur" from c. 1870 until 1928.

=== Dewan title ===
- 1679 – 1715 Anup Singh II
- 1718 – 1738 Fateh Singh
- 1738 – 1770 ....
- 1770 – 1787 Abhai Singh
- 1787 – 1795? Dip Singh
- 1795 – 1819 Durjan Sal (d. 1819)
- 1819 Balwant Singh
- 1819 – 1868 Shir Singh (b. 1814 – d. 1868)
- 27 Nov 1868 – Apr 1873 Amar Singh (b. 1834 – d. ....)

=== Rao Bahadur title ===
- Apr 1873 – 1899 Amar Singh (s.a.)
- 1899 – 18 Jan 1908 Bhawani Singh
- 19 Jan 1908 – 1928 Durjan Sal Singh (b. 1897 – d. 1942)

=== Raja title ===
- 1928 – 1942 Durjan Sal Singh (s.a.)
- 1942 – 15 Aug 1947 Yashodar Singh (b. 1918 – d. 1961)
- Priyavrat Singh khichi

== See also ==
- Bhopal Agency
- Political integration of India
