= Garh Kundar =

Village in Madhya Pradesh, India

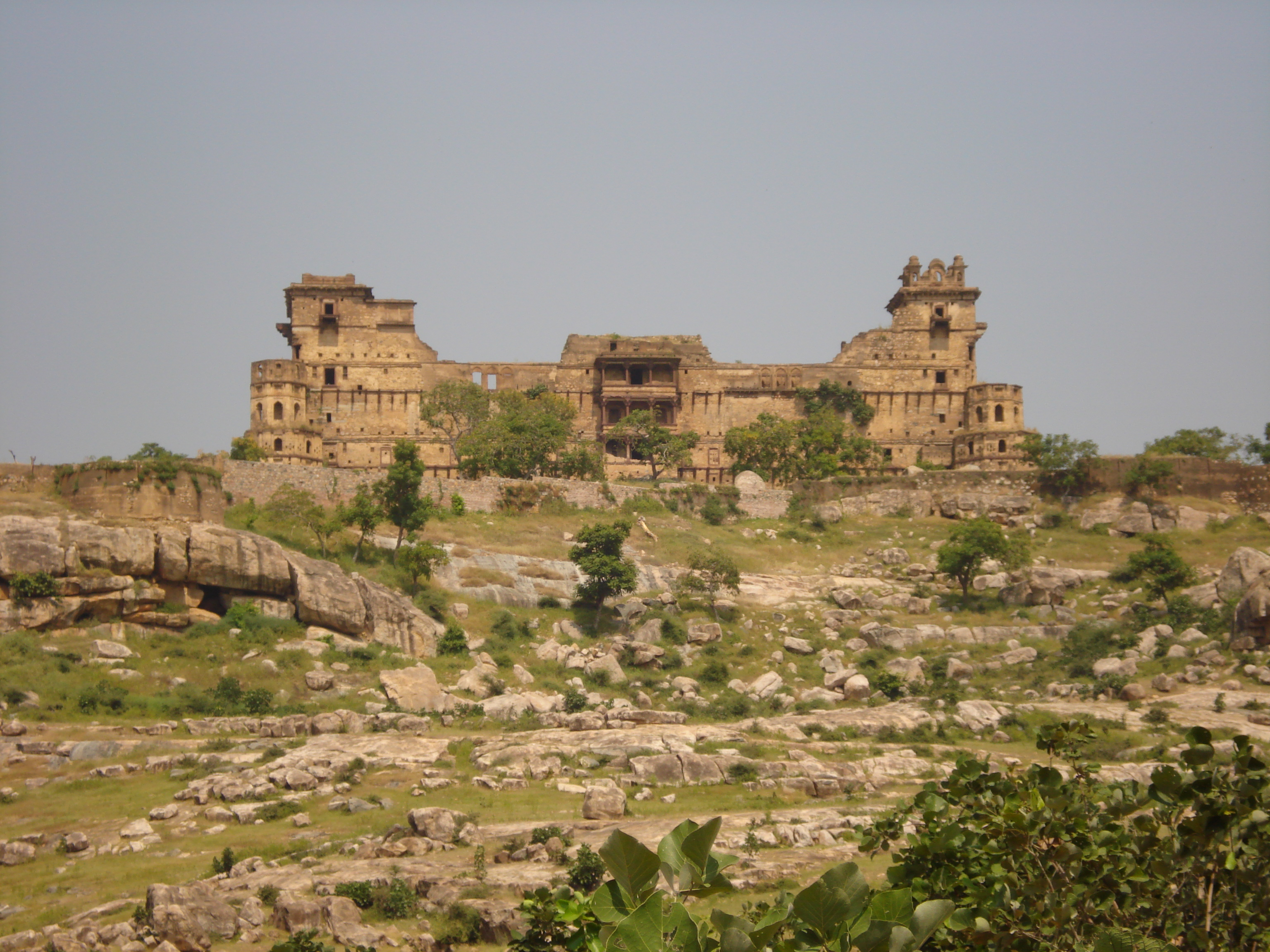
The Ruins of Garh Kundar Fort

Garh Kundar (also spelled Gadhkudhar) is a small village in the city of Niwari district of Madhya Pradesh. It has been named so after the splendid fort, or "Garh", of Kundar located here. From 925 to 1507 AD, Garh Kundar fort witnessed many battles and bloodshed. Yashovarma Chandel (925–940 AD) built the fort after conquering south western Bundelkhand. In the battle between Prithviraj Chauhan and the Chandelas in 1182 AD fort commander. Shayaji Parmar lost and the fort came under Prithviraj Control. Then Chouhan King Prithviraj III appointed Khet Singh Khangar as the ruler of this fort who founded the Khangar Dynasty afterwards.

The fort is built at the top of a hill and has five stories, in which two are underground and three are above it. The fort is built in such a way that it is visible from 5 km but as one keeps on coming near to it, the fort seems to be away from sight and the main road gets diverted to any other direction.

The history of the fort has been beautifully written by Vrindawanlal Verma in his book

== Khangar Dynasty ==
When Prithviraj Chauhan lost to Mohammad Ghori in 1192 AD, then khub singh Khangar declared himself as the independent ruler.

== Bundela Dynasty ==
in 1288 AD, the first Dynasty of Bundelas was established. Hemvati was wedded to Punyapal Panwar/Parmar. King Sohanpal was the first King of Bundelas who died in 1299 AD.

After him, his son King Sahjendra Bundela ruled from 1299 to 1326 AD.

In 1507 AD, Bundela king Rudra Pratap Singh established Orchha as his new capital at the banks of Betwa River which is now famous for Shri Ram Mandir.

== Origin of name ==
The name ‘Kundar’ is derived from ‘Kundarka’ (Kund + Arka, कुंड+अर्क). ‘Kund’ (कुंड) means ‘pond’ and Arka’ (अर्क) means ‘sun’. There was a pond in the village, It is said that the people used to get rid of their skin diseases after bathing in the pond or the ‘Arka-kund’. The remnants of the pond can still be seen near the temple of ‘Giddh vahini maa’ near the fort.
