= Orchha State =

Princely state of India (1501–1950)

Coordinates: 25.35°N 78.64°E

- Kingdom
- 1501–1950
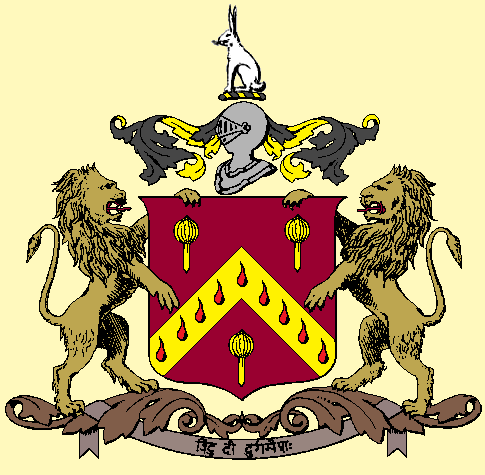
- Flag Coat of arms

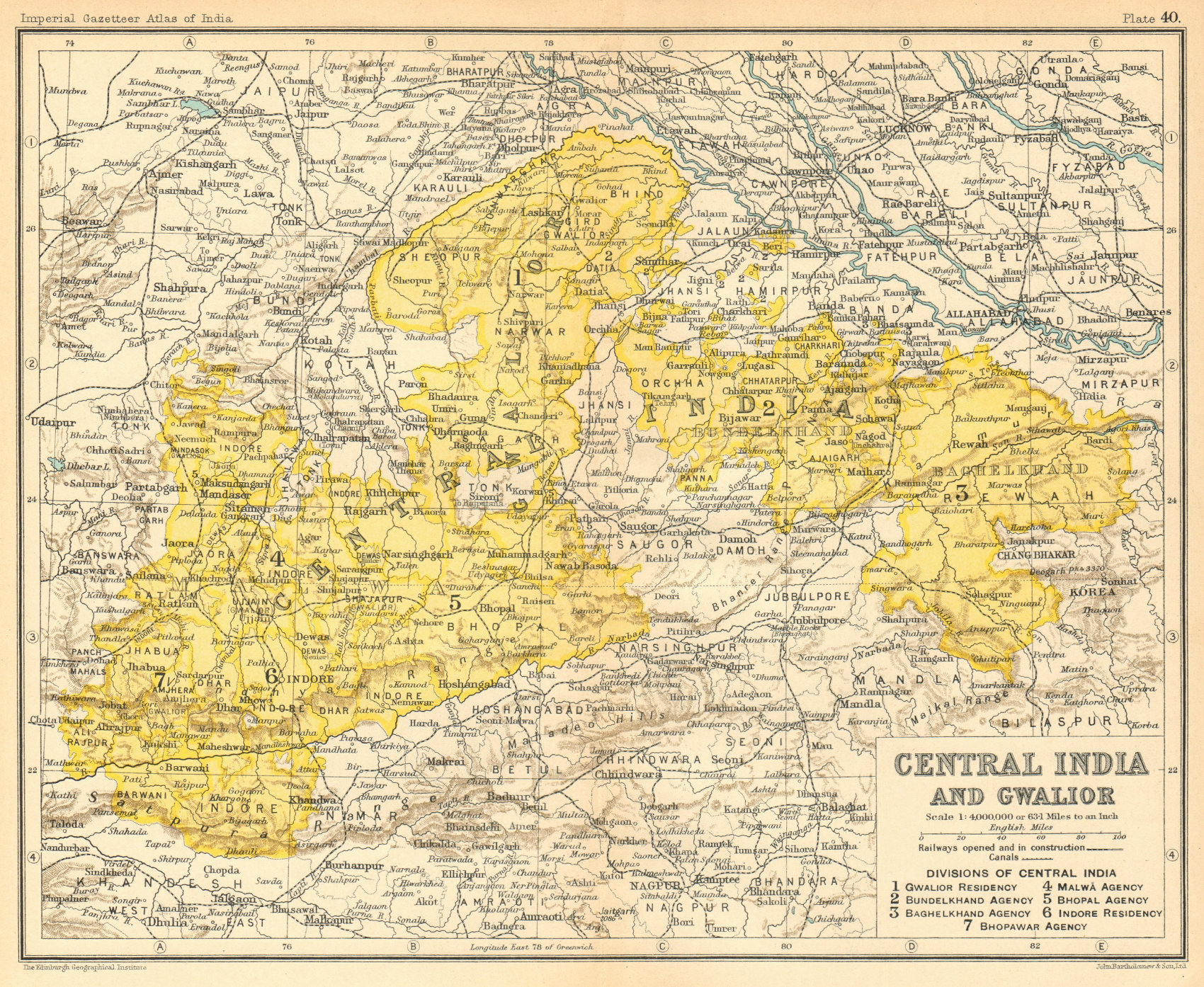
- Orchha State in the Imperial Gazetteer of India
- Capital: Orchha, Tikamgarh
- Area
  - 1908: 5,400 km^{2} (2,100 sq mi)
- Population
  - 1908: 321,364
- Government
- Raja, then Maharaja
  - 1501–1531 (first): Rudra Pratap Singh
  - 1675–1731: Chhatrasal
  - 1930–1950: Vir Singh II
- History
  - Established: 1501
  - Accession to the Union of India: 1950
| Succeeded by |
| India |
- Today part of: India

Orchha State (also known as Urchha, Ondchha and Tikamgarh) was a kingdom situated in the Bundelkhand region and later a princely state in British India. The state was ruled by Bundela clan of Rajputs. It was located within what is now the state of Madhya Pradesh.

The Chaturbhuj Temple was built by the Queen of Orchha, while the Raj Mandir was built by Madhukar Shah during his reign, 1554 to 1591. In 1811, during the period of Company Rule in India, it became part of the Bundelkhand Agency within the Central India Agency; after the independence of India in 1947, it acceded to the Union of India, in 1950.

== History ==
=== Before company rule ===
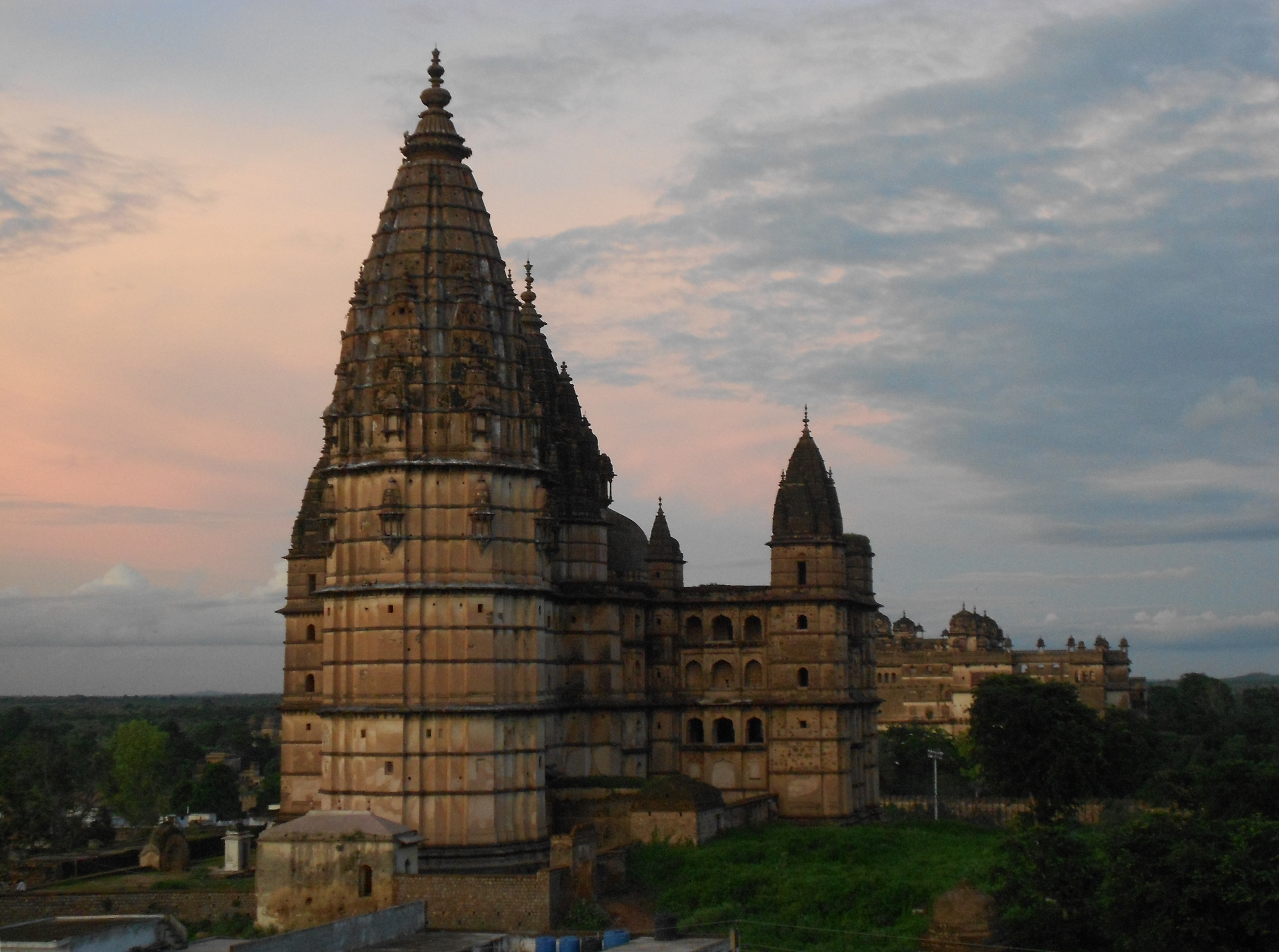
Chaturbhuj Temple at Orchha, is noted for having one of the tallest Vimana among Hindu temples standing at 344 feet.

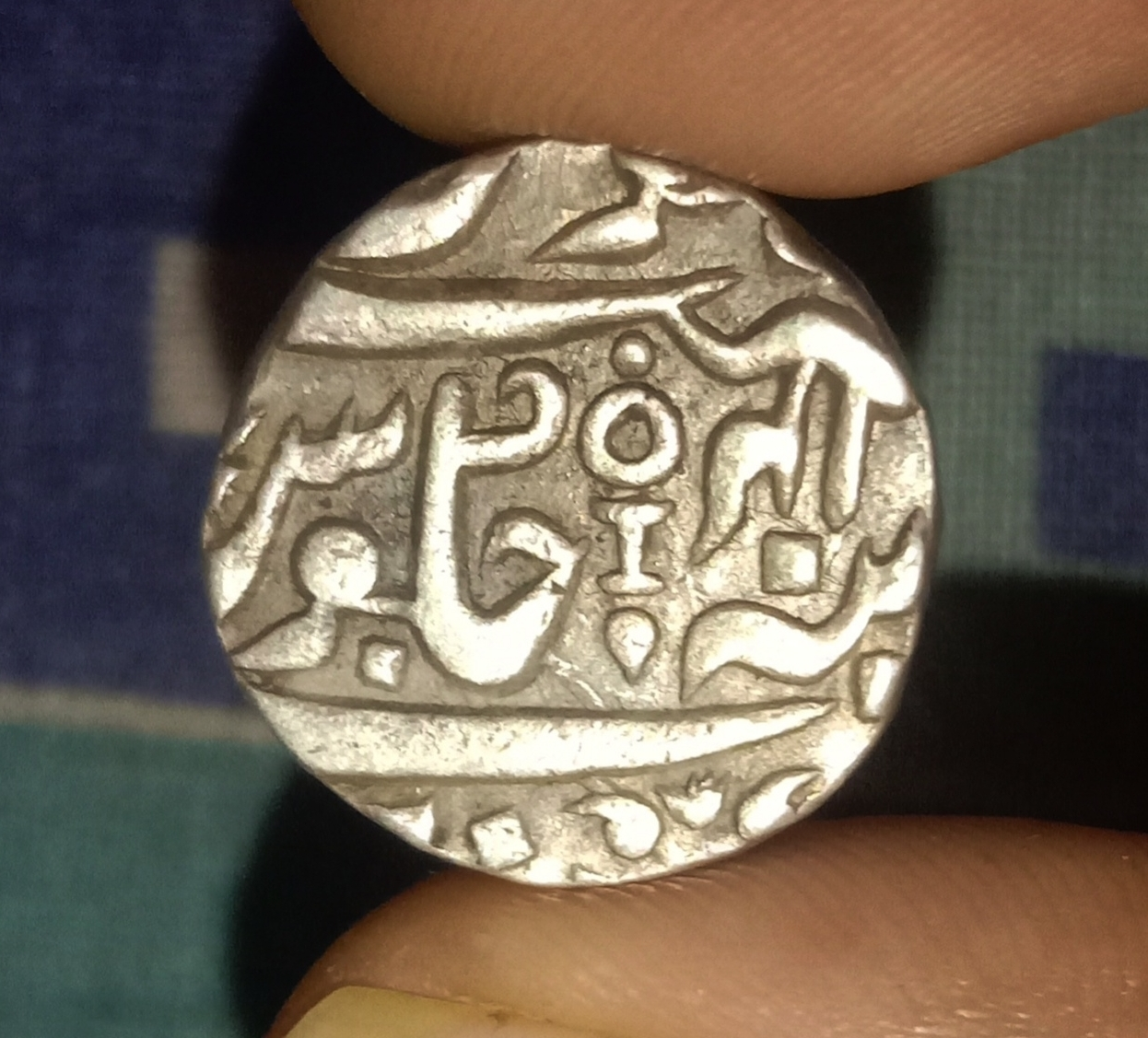
Silver Rupee of the Orchha State, minted during the reign of king Vikramajit Mahendra, struck in the name of Mughal emperor Shah Alam II.

Orchha State was founded in 1531 by the Rudra Pratap Singh, who became its first king. He had a fortress at Garh Kundar and took advantage of the politically unstable environment of the time to make territorial gains. He moved to Orchha on the banks of the river Betwa and established it as his new capital. He died in the same year.

Rudra Pratap Singh was succeeded by his son, Bharatichand, who died without leaving an heir in 1554 and was in turn succeeded by his younger brother, Madhukar Shah. Both Bharatichand and Madhukar had to deal with attacks, organised under the Afghan Islam Shah Suri (r. 1545–53) and the Mughal emperor Akbar (r. 1556–1605). Events involving the former were noted by the court poet Keshavdas and those involving Madhukar, who had to relinquish lands to Akbar in 1577 and 1588, were recorded in the Akbarnama. Madhukar's position had become so precarious in the 1570s that he agreed to Orchha becoming a tributary state and to enlistment of himself and his family in the service of the Mughal empire, but another near-contemporary historian, `Abd al-Qadir Bada'uni, records him as a rebel in 1583.

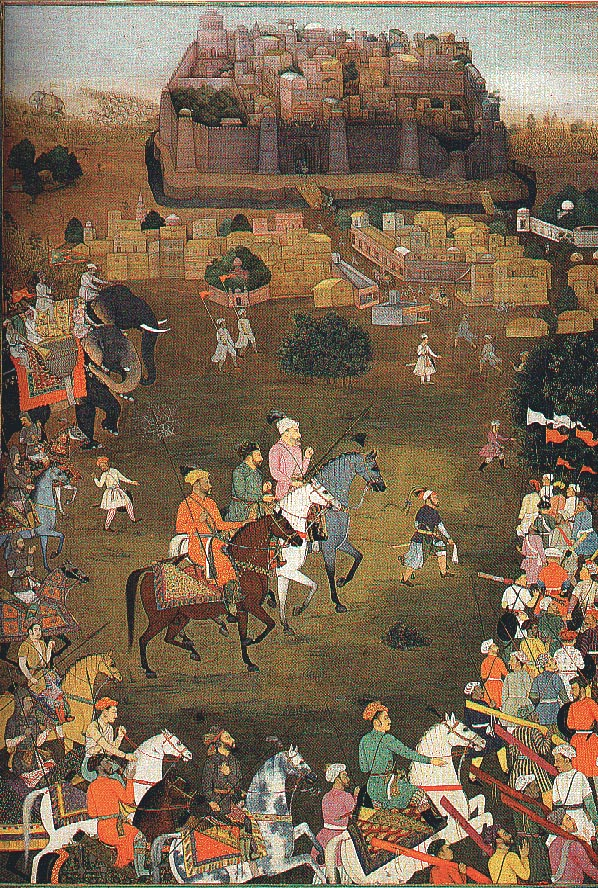
The capture of Orchha by invading Mughal forces (October 1635).

During the rule of the Mughal emperor Jahangir, his vassal, Vir Singh Deo, was ruler of the Orchha area. His reign ended in either 1626 or 1627 and it was during this period that Orchha reached its zenith in both political power and architectural splendour. Examples of the architecture include the Jahangir Mahal (built ca. 1605) and the Sawan Bhadon Mahal.

In the early-17th century, Raja Jhujhar Singh rebelled against the Mughal emperor but was defeated. Shah Jahan placed the former raja's brother on the throne in 1641. Orchha was the only Bundela state not entirely subjugated by the Maratha Confederacy in the 18th century.

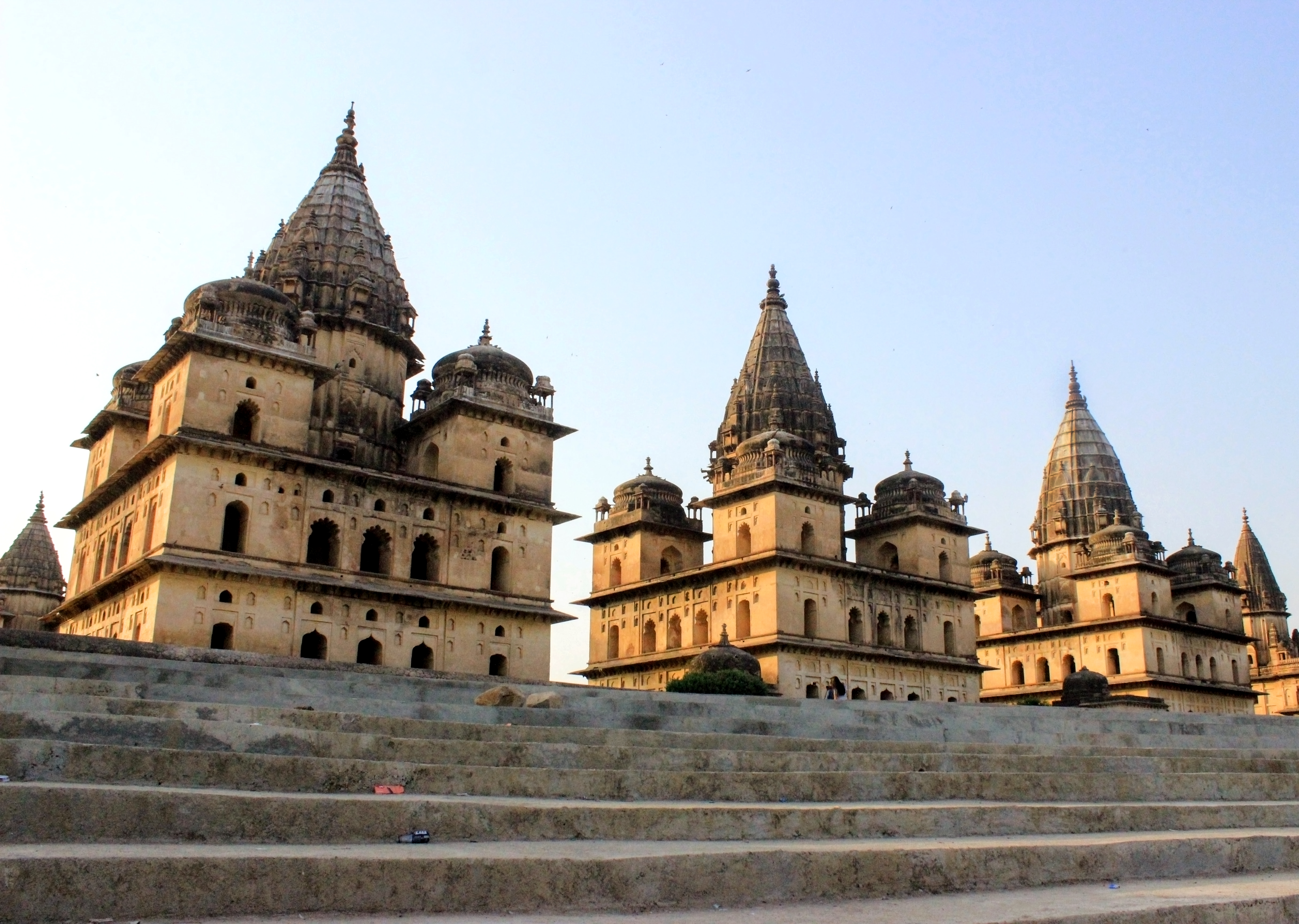
The Royal Chhatris of Orchha

The town of Tehri, Tikamgarh, about 52 miles (84 km) south of Orchha, became the capital of Orchha state in 1783, and is now the district town; Tehri was the site of the fort of Tikamgarh, and the town eventually took the name of the fort.

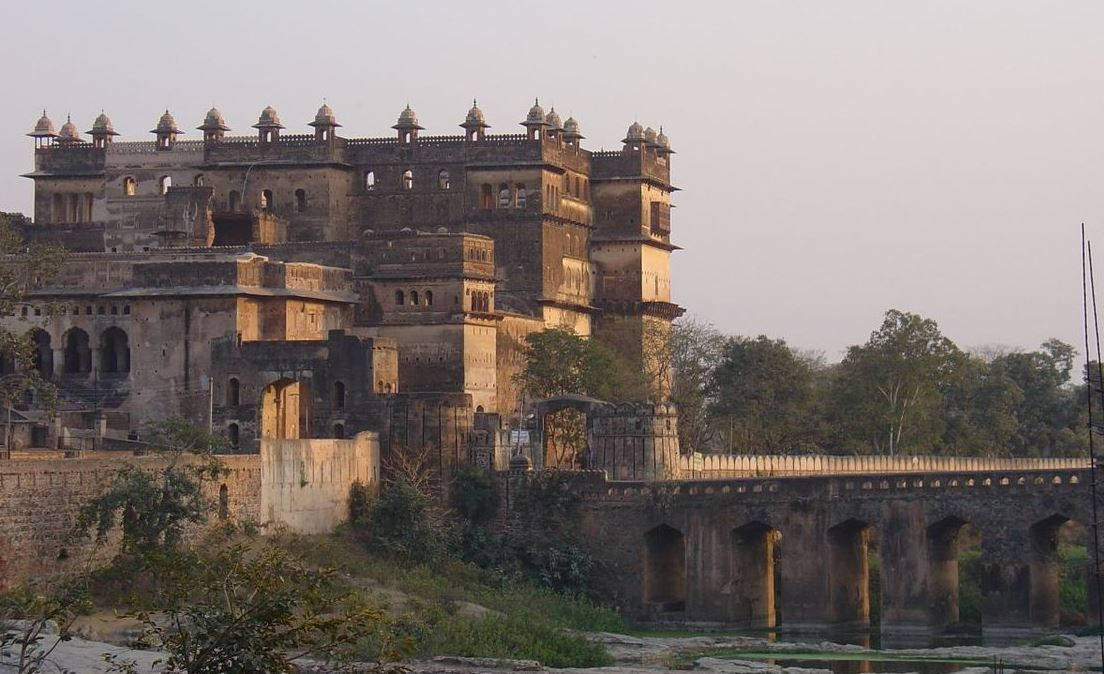
Orchha Fort complex

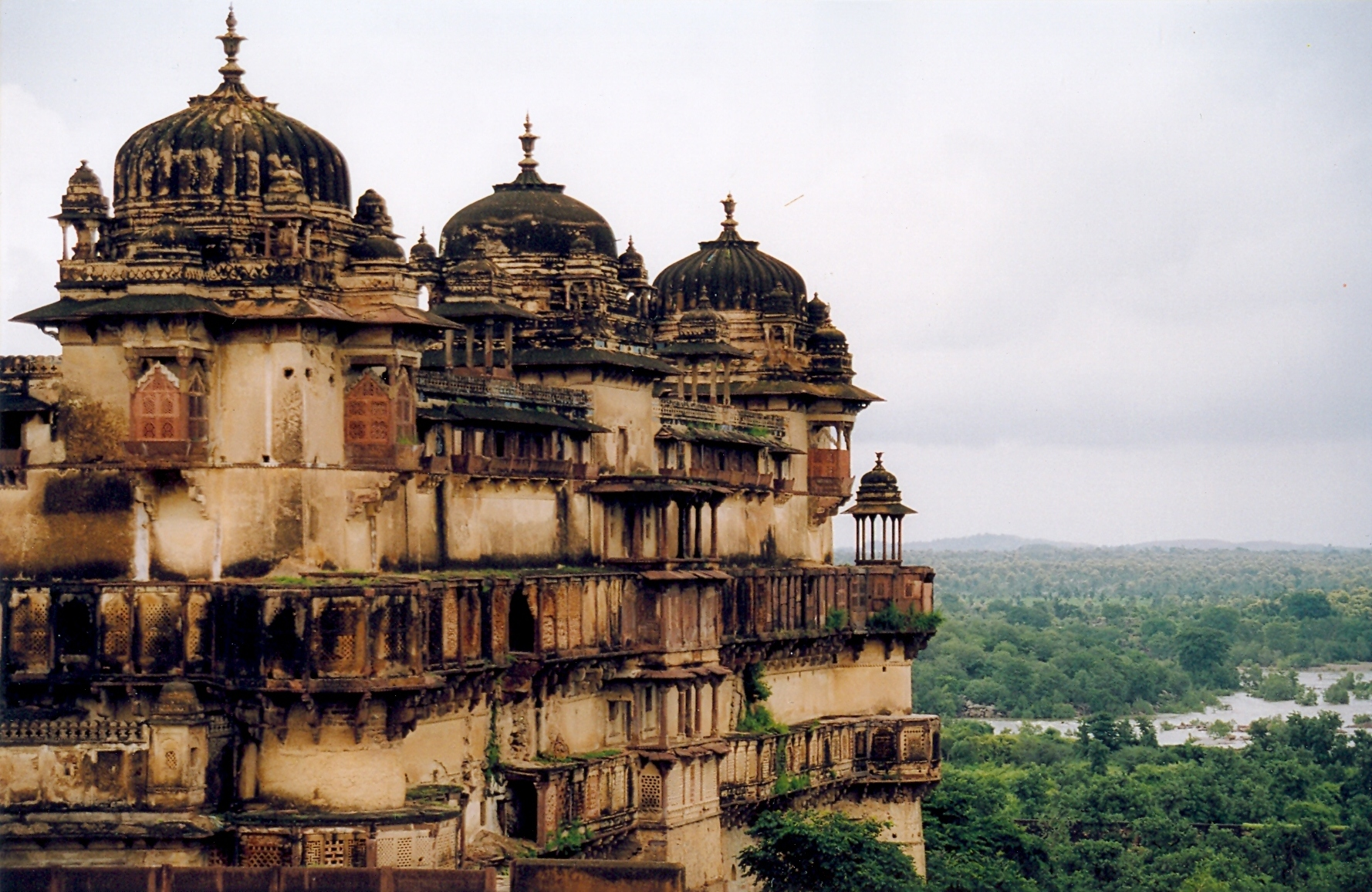
Jahangir Mahal, Orchha

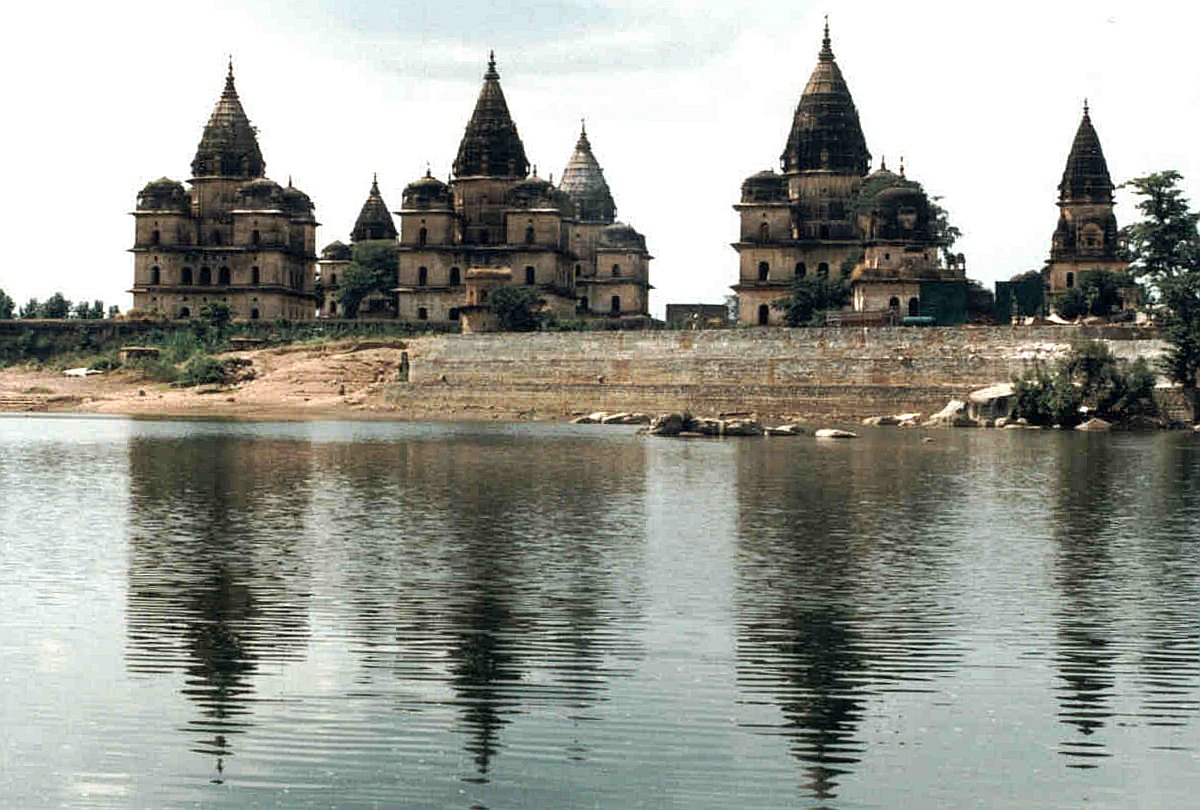
Memorial Chhatris of the ruler of Orchha, on the bank of the Betwa River.

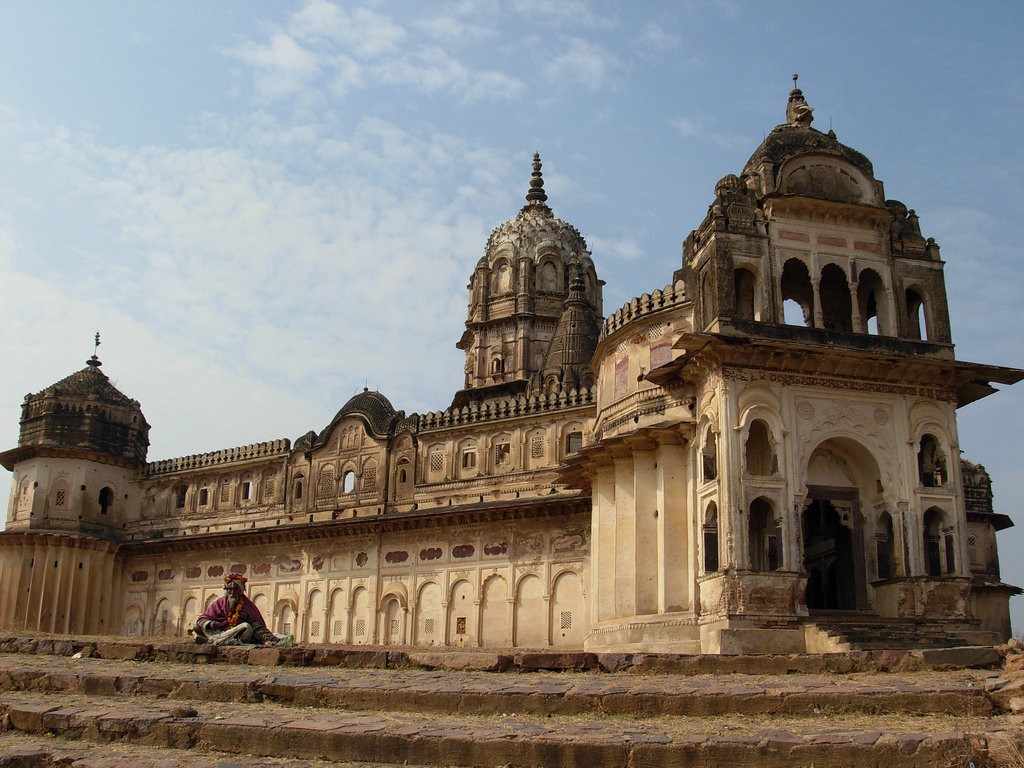
Lakshmi Temple, Orchha

=== During the British era ===
On 23 December 1812, Orchha king made treaty of alliance with Britishers. Hamir Singh, who ruled from 1848 to 1874, was elevated to the style of Maharaja in 1865. During his reign the allied forces of Orchha and Datia invaded Jhansi in 1857 intending to divide the Jhansi territory between them. However they were defeated by Rani Lakshmibai's army and her allies in August 1857. (She intended at this time to hold Jhansi on behalf of the British who had no forces there at the time.) Maharaja Pratap Singh (born 1854, died 1930), who succeeded to the throne in 1874, devoted himself entirely to the development of his state, himself designing most of the engineering and irrigation works that were executed during his reign.

In 1908, the boundaries of the state lay between 24° 26′ and 25° 40′ North and 78° 26′ and 79° 21′ East. It formed a part of the Bundelkhand Agency and had an area of 2,080 square miles (5,400 square kilometres). The 1901 Census of India recorded a population of 321,634. It was the oldest and highest in rank of all the Bundela states, with a 15-gun salute, and its maharajas bore the hereditary title First of the Prince of Bundelkhand.

Vir Singh, Pratap Singh's successor, merged his state with the Union of India on 1 January 1950. The district became part of Vindhya Pradesh state, which was merged into the state of Madhya Pradesh in 1956.

== Rulers ==
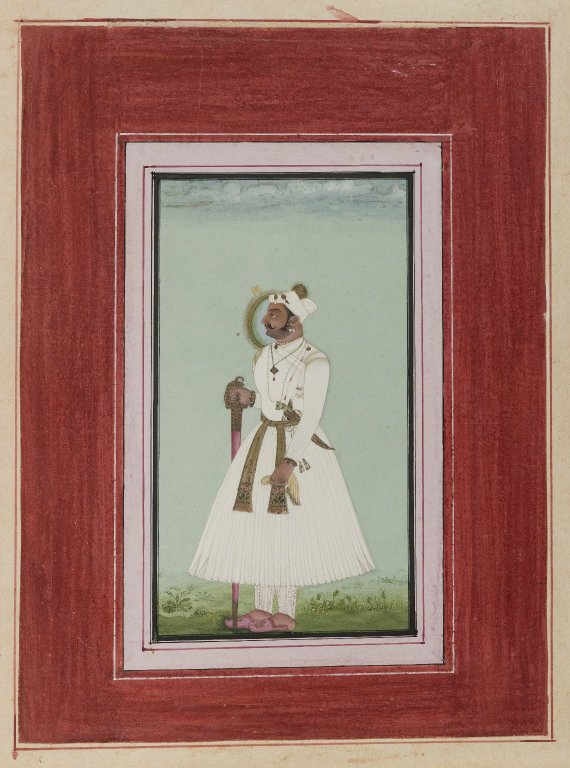
Vir Singh Deo

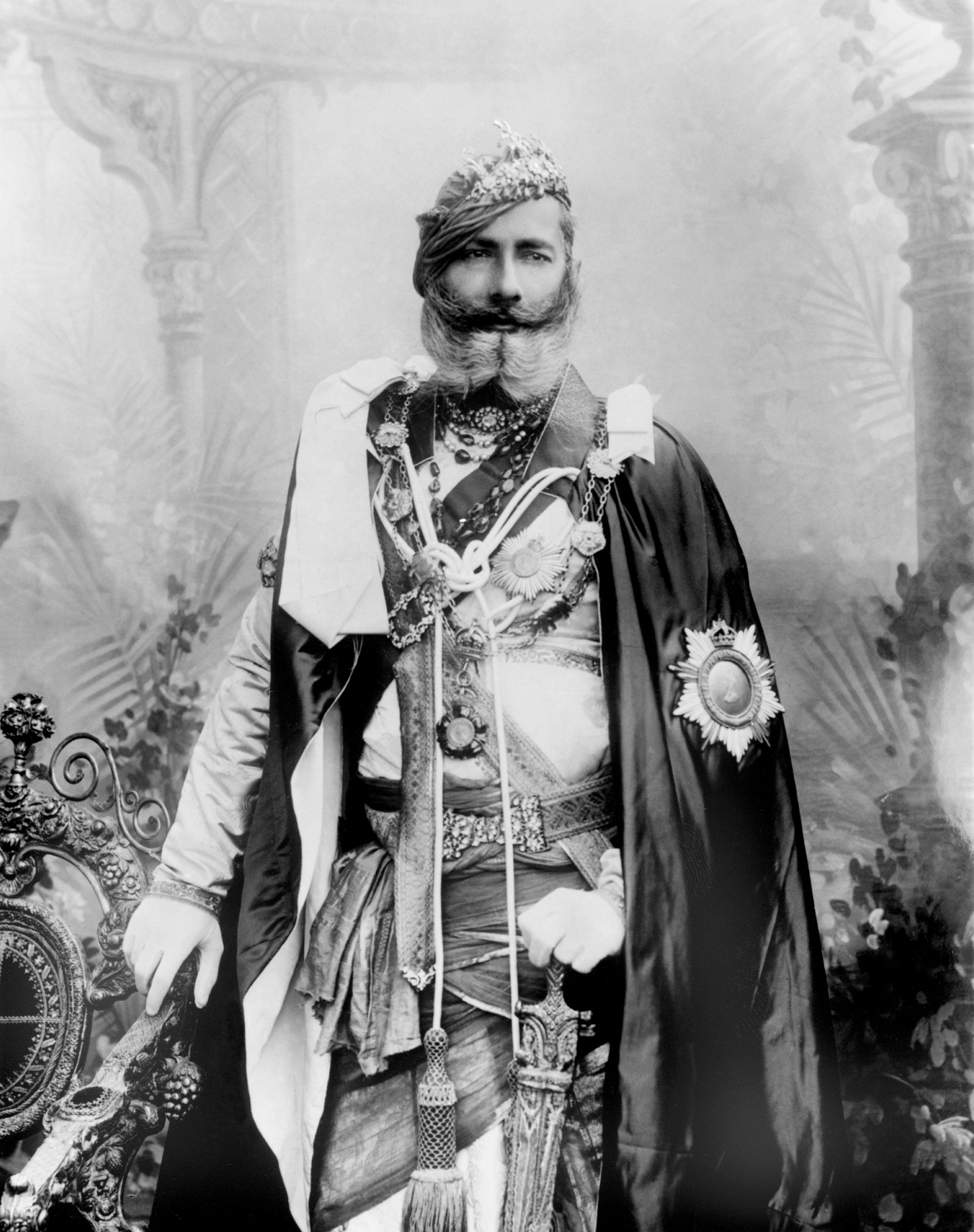
Maharaja Pratap Singh of Orchha

=== Rajas ===
Prior to Company Rule, the rulers of Orchha all held the title of Raja. They were:

- Rudra Pratap Singh (1501–1531)
- Bharatichand (1531–1554)
- Madhukar Shah (1554–1592)
- Ram Shah (1592–1605)
- Vir Singh Deo (also spelled Bir Singh Deo) (1605–1626/7)
- Jhujhar Singh (1626/7–1635) (brother of Hardaul Singh)
- Devi Singh (1635–1641) (brother of Jhujhar Singh)
- Pahar Singh (1641–1653)
- Sujan Singh (1653–1672)
- Indramani Singh (1672–1675)
- Jaswant Singh (1675–1684)
- Bhagwat Singh (1684–1689)
- Udwat Singh (1689–1735)
- Prithvi Singh (1735–1752)
- Sanwant Singh (1752–1765)
- Hati Singh (1765–1768)
- Man Singh (1768–1775)
- Bharti Singh (1775–1776)
- Vikramajit Mahendra (1776–1817)
- Dharam Pal (1817–1834) Queen Ladai Sarkar was his wife
- Taj Singh (1834–1842)
- Surjain Singh (1842–1848) (Queen Ladai Sarkar ruled at this time)
- Hamir Singh (1848–1865)

=== Maharajas ===
During the British era, initially under Company Rule and then as a part of the British Raj, the title of Raja was in use until 1865, when it was replaced with that of Maharaja. The rulers were:

- Hamir Singh (1865–1874)
- Pratap Singh (1874–1930)
- Vir Singh II (4 March 1930 – 7 October 1956) (acceded 1 January 1950) (b.1899 – d.1956)
- Devendra Singh (1956 – 1971)

=== Titular Maharajas ===
- Devendra Singh (1971 – 1978)
- Madhukar Shah (1978 – present)

== Postal history ==
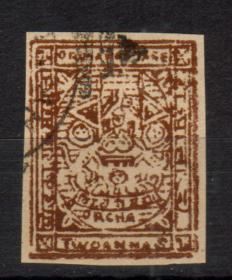
Orchha stamp, dated 1914

Postage stamps for the state were prepared for use in 1897 but were never issued. The first Orchha State stamps were issued in 1913 (half-anna and one anna); in 1914 there was another issue of four stamps (half-anna to four annas). The third issue was in 1939 when a range of stamps bearing the maharajah's portrait were issued which included denominations from half-anna to eight annas and one rupee to ten rupees.

Separate stamps were discontinued on 30 April 1950 after the state was merged with the Union of India early that year.

== Coinage ==
Orchha minted coins in copper and silver. The currency was known as Gaja Shahi because it most commonly bore the symbol of a mace (gaja) on the reverse. The mace symbol was imitated on coins issued by Datia State.

== See also ==
- Hasht-Bhaiya
