= Bundela =

Rajput clan of the Indian subcontinent

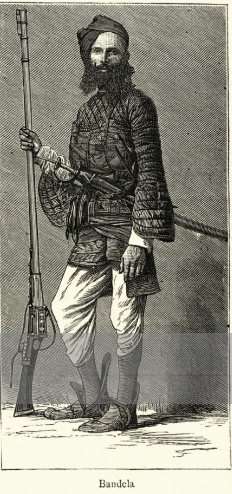
Bandela Rajput

The Bundelas and neighbouring South Asian polities circa 1250 CE.

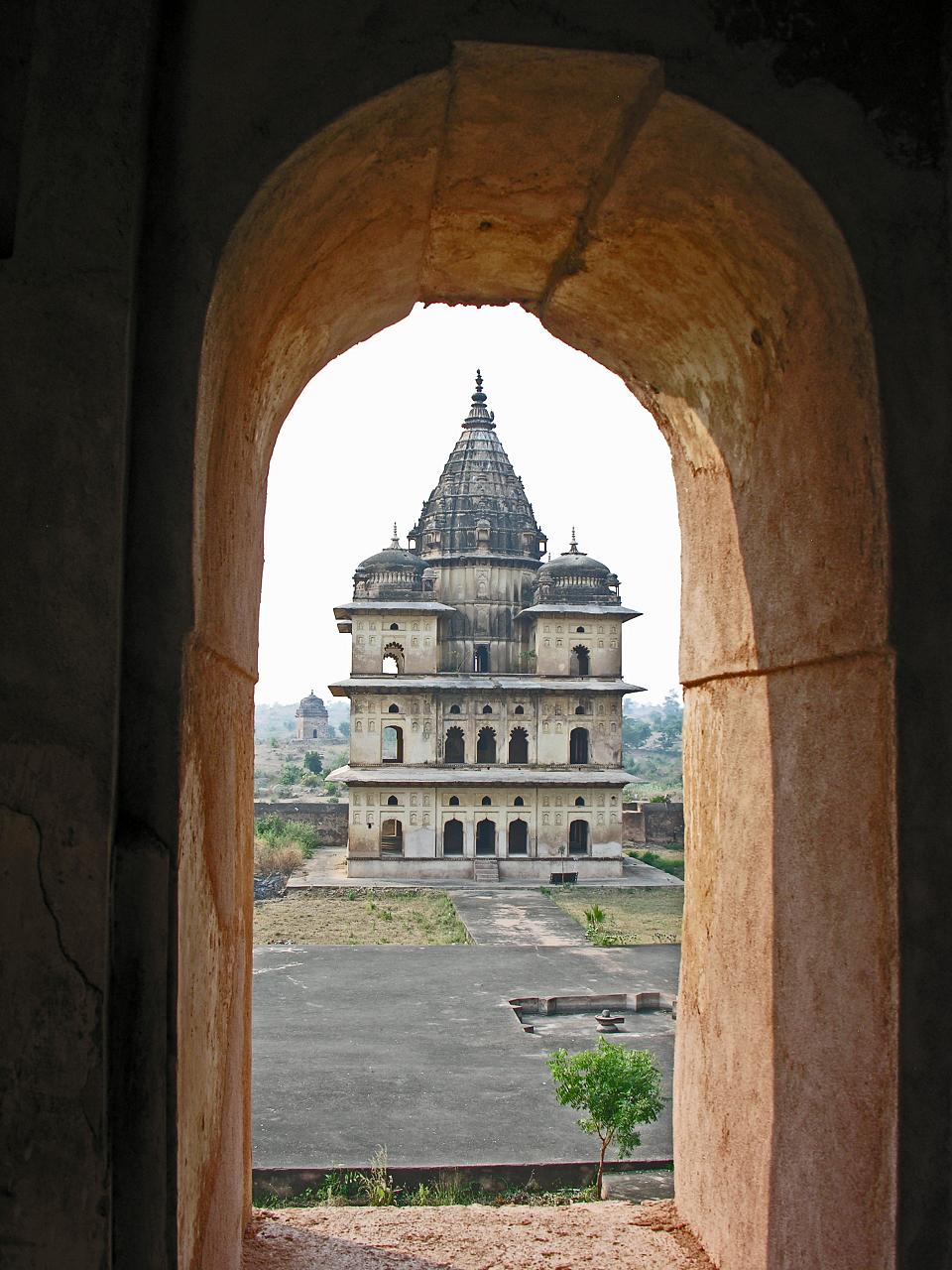
Chhatris (cenotaphs) of Bundela rulers, on the Betwa River near Orchha

The Bundela is a Rajput clan. The region bundelkhand gets its name from the Bundela Rajputs, who ruled large parts of the area during medieval times.. Over several generations, the cadet lineages of Bundela Rajputs founded several states in area what came to be known as Bundelkhand anciently known as Chedi Kingdom from the 16th century.

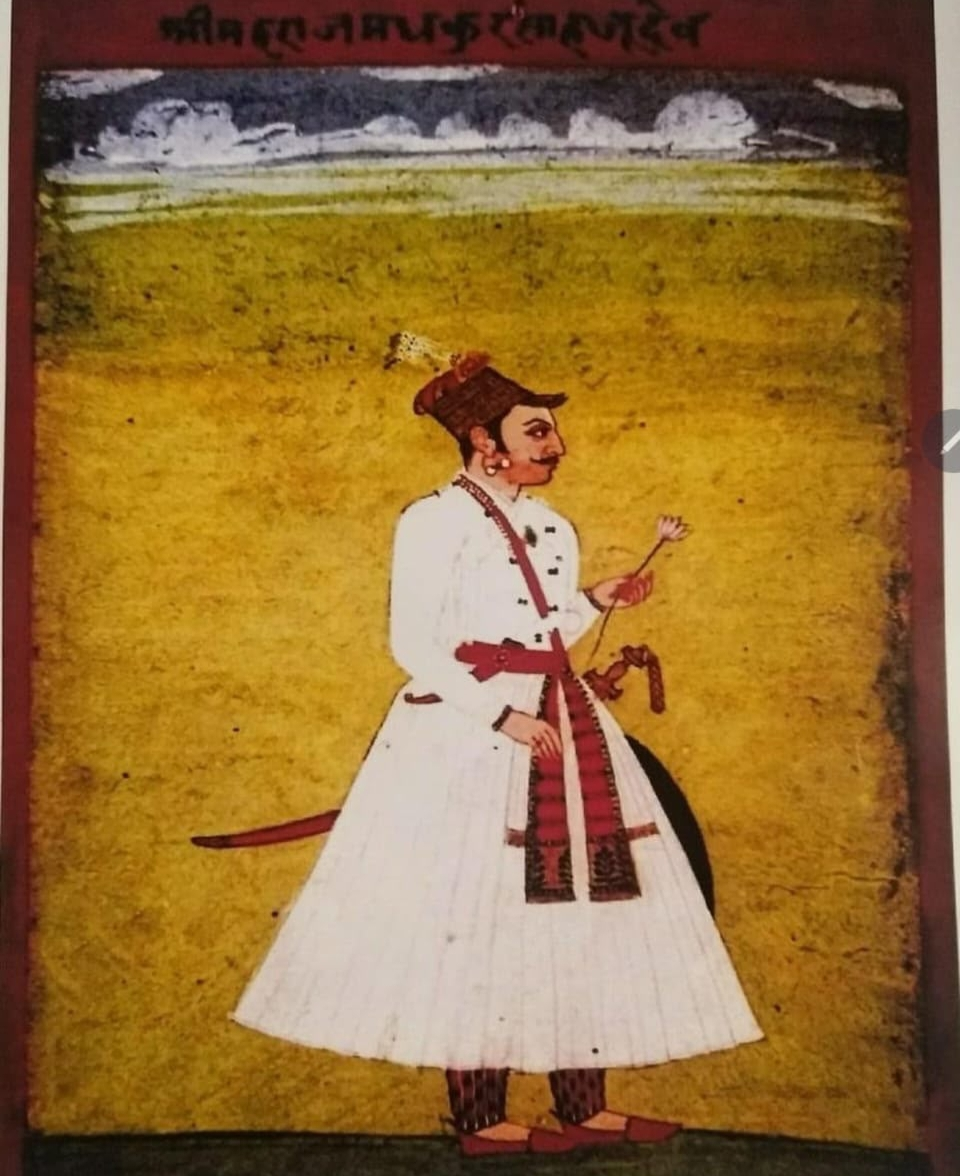
Raja Madhukar Shah Deo of Orchha

== Etymology ==
As per Jaswant Lal Mehta, the word "Bundela" is based on a deity, named Bind-bhasini Devi, who is believed to have her abode on the Bindhachal, the northern most part of the Vindhya ranges.

== Expansion legends ==
According to Bundela legends, Jagdas' descendant Arjunpal was the ruler of Mahoni. His eldest son Birpal succeeded him as the king of Mahoni, although his younger son Sohanpal was the best warrior. To get his share of the kingdom, Sohanpal sought help from Naga (alias Hurmat Singh), the Khangar ruler of Kurar (Kundar). Naga demanded a matrimonial alliance in return. When Sohanpal refused, Naga tried to detain him and forcibly agree him to the condition. Sohanpal escaped, and unsuccessfully sought help from the Chauhans, the Salingars, and the Kachwahas. Ultimately, a Panwar chief named Panpal (or Punyapal) agreed to help him. Their joint army defeated Naga in 1288 CE. Sohanpal killed all the Khangar men in the fort, but spared the babies on the condition that the Khangars would serve as the servants of the Bundelas. Sohanpal became the king of Kurar, and his daughter married Panpal.

== Historical kingdoms ==
Rudra Pratap Singh (reigned 1501-1531 CE), said to be a descendant of Sohanpal, moved his capital from Garh Kundar to Orchha in 1531 CE. The Orchha State was the parent Bundela kingdom. Datia State (1626 CE) and Panna State (1657 CE) separated from the Orchha State. After the death of Panna's founder Chhatrasal in 1731, Ajaigarh State, Bijawar State and Charkhari State separated from Panna. The official records of the Chhatarpur State also mentioned the clan of its rulers as "Panwar Bundela". Its founder was a Panwar, who was in service of the Bundela ruler of Panna State until 1785 CE.

The Bundelkhand ("Bundela domain") region was named after the Bundelas.

The different Bundela chieftains of Bundelkhand often fought against each other which the Mughals often took advantage of.

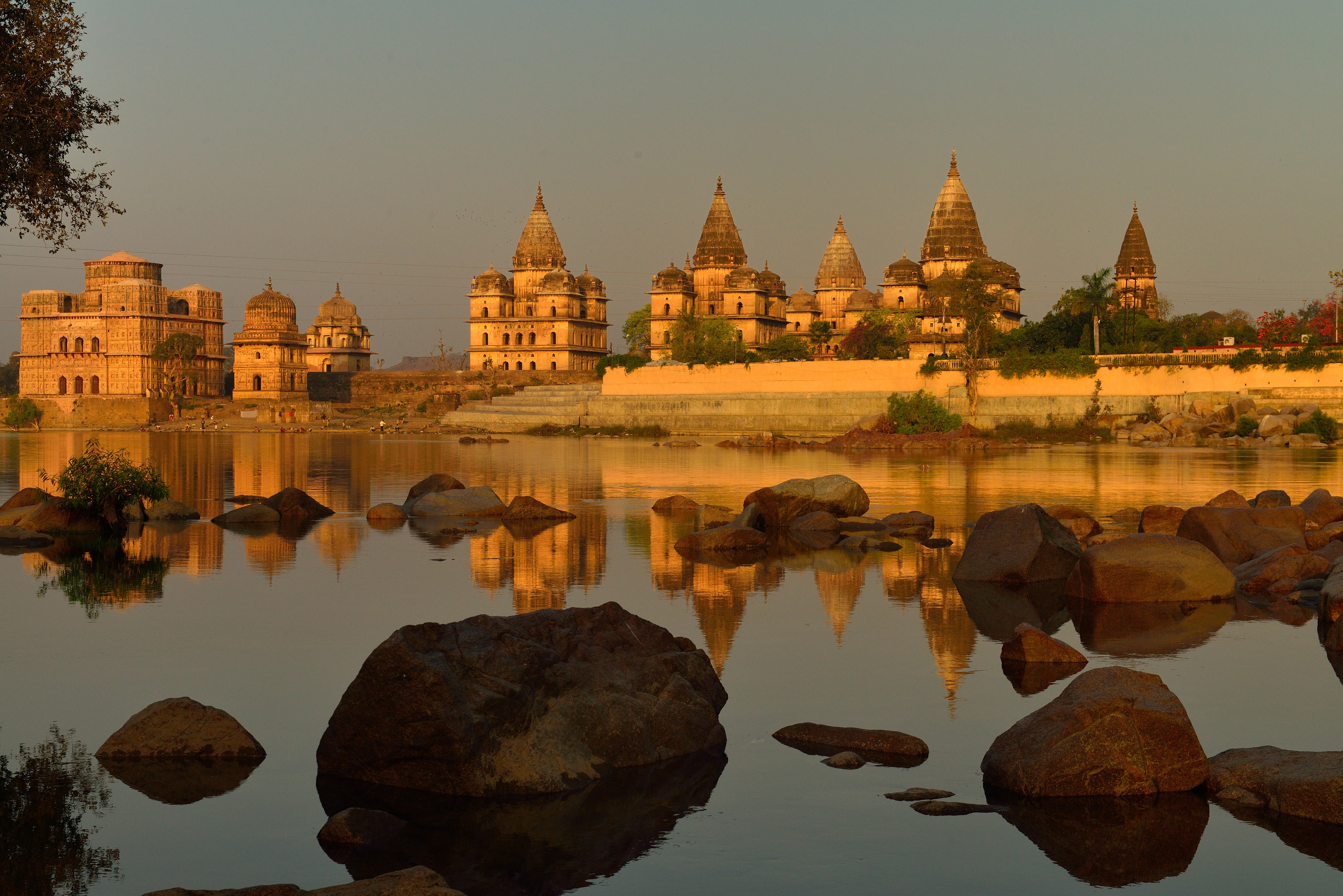
Chhatris (Cenotaphs) on the bank of Betwa River, Orcha, Madhya Pradesh.

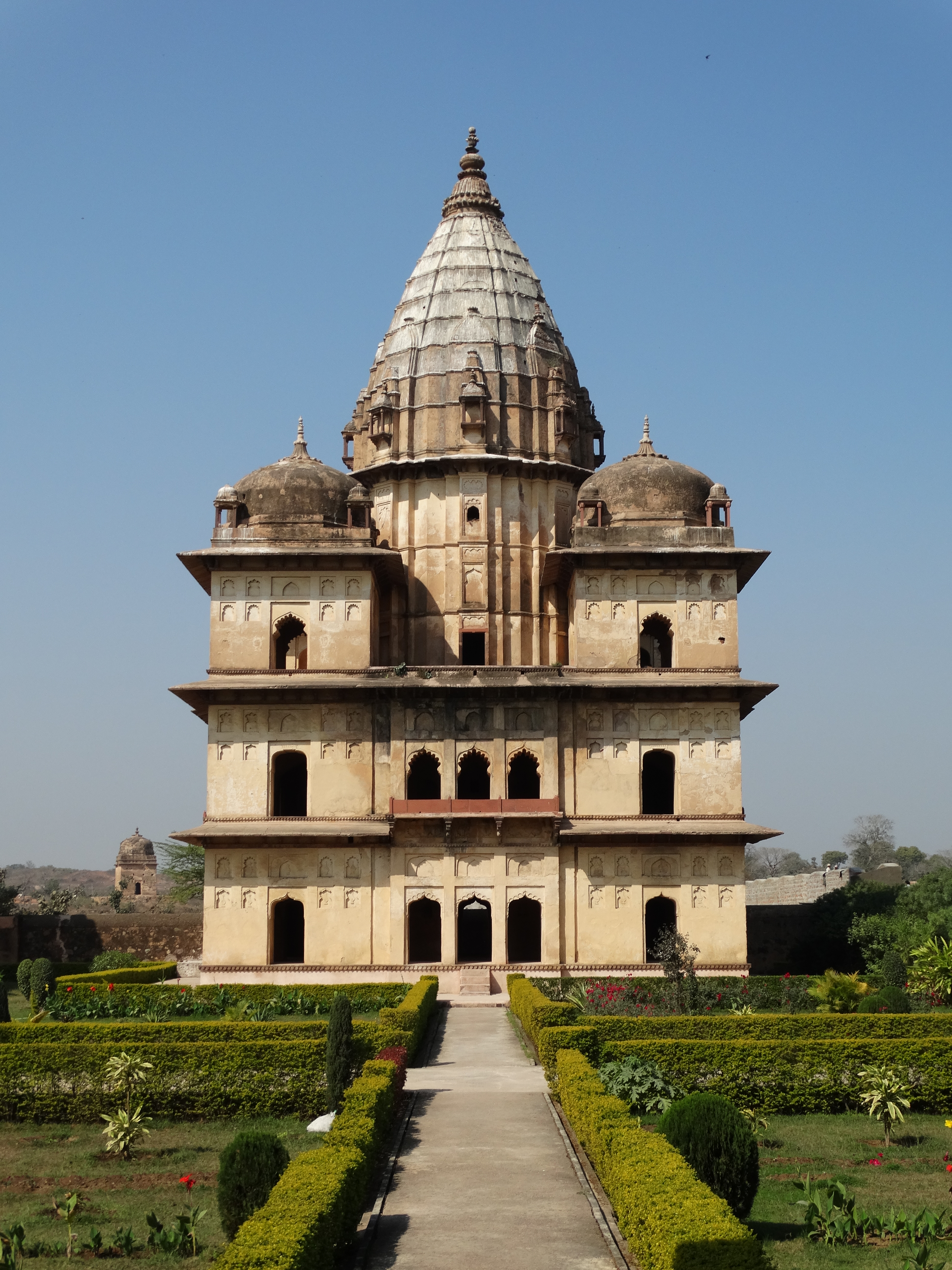
Bundela king's chhatri.

== See also ==
- Bundelkhand Agency#States
- Banaut - Branch of Bundela Rajputs in Bihar and Jharkhand
- Banaphar
