= Kolu Khedi =

Kolu Khedi may refer to:

- Kolu Khedi, Huzur, a village in Madhya Pradesh, India
- Kolu Khedi Kalan, a village in Madhya Pradesh, India
- Kolu Khedi Khurd, a village in Madhya Pradesh, India
- Kolu Khedi, Berasia (census code 482280), a village in Madhya Pradesh, India
- Kolu Khedi, Berasia (census code 482219), a village in Madhya Pradesh, India
