= Bhoj Wetland =

Lakes in Bhopal, Madhya Pradesh, India

Coordinates: 23.25°N 77.34°E

Designations

Ramsar Wetland
- Designated: 19 August 2002
- Reference no.: 1206

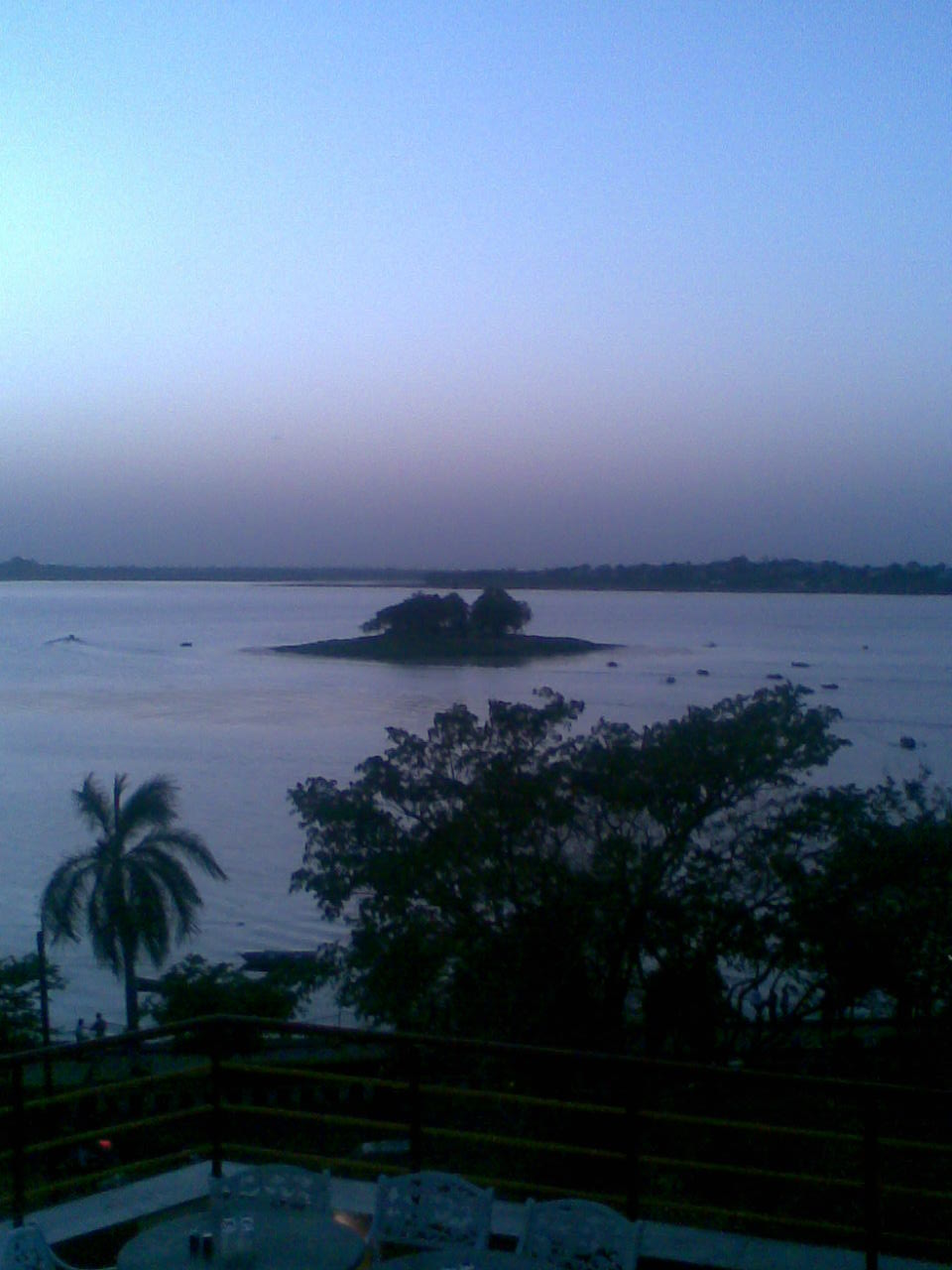
The Bhojtal of Bhopal

The Bhoj Wetland consists of two lakes located in the city of Bhopal, the capital of the central Indian state of Madhya Pradesh. The two lakes are the Bhojtal (Upper Lake) & the Lower Lake, which lie to the west of the city center. The Bhojtal has an area of 31 km^{2}, and drains a catchment or watershed of 361 km^{2}. The watershed of the Bhojtal is mostly rural, with some urbanized areas around its eastern end. The lower lake has an area of 1.29 km^{2}. Its catchment is 9.6 km^{2} and is mostly urbanized; the Lower Lake also receives subsurface seepage from the Bhojtal.

The Bhojtal was created by Paramara Raja Bhoj (1005-1055), ruler of Malwa. He established Bhopal (also named after him) to secure the eastern frontier of his kingdom. The lake was created by constructing an earthen dam across the Kolans River. The Kolans was formerly a tributary of the Halali River; with the creation of the Bhojtal and a diversion channel, the upper reach of the Kolans River and the Bhojtal now drain into the Kaliasot River. Bhadbhada dam was constructed in 1965 at the southeast corner of the Bhojtal; it now controls the outflow to the Kaliasot river.

The Lower Lake was created in 1794 by Nawab Chhote Khan, Minister of Nawab Hayath Mohammad Khan, to beautify the city. It is also contained behind an earthen dam, and drains into the Halali River via the lower reach of the Kolans River, presently known as the Patra Drain. Both the Kaliasot and Halali Rivers are tributaries of the Betwa River.

The lakes are home to a diverse flora and fauna, including many waterbirds. They have been designated a wetland of international importance under the international Ramsar Convention since August 2002.
