= Nagwans =

Village in Uttar Pradesh, India

- Village
- Location in Uttar Pradesh, India
- Country: India
- State: Uttar Pradesh
- District: Lalitpur
- Tehsil: Talbehat

Area
  - Total: 6.511 km^{2} (2.514 sq mi)

Population (2011)
  - Total: 1,510
  - Density: 232/km^{2} (601/sq mi)
- Time zone: UTC+5:30 (IST)

Nagwans is a village in Jakhaura block of Lalitpur district, Uttar Pradesh, India. It is about 78 kilometres (48 mi) from Jhansi. As of 2011, it had a population of 1,510, in 297 households.

== Name ==
According to Paul Whalley, the suffix -wāns in Nagwāns is a variant form of the suffix -bās, ultimately from Sanskrit vāsa, meaning "dwelling". The variant -wāns is common in Lalitpur district; other examples are Kisalwans, Satarwans, Satwansa, Kurwans, and Khitwans.

== Geography ==
According to the 2011 census, Nagwans has a total area of 651.1 hectares, of which 392.1 were currently farmland and 85.9 were under non-agricultural use. 97.2 hectares were classified as cultivable but not currently under any agricultural use, and 0 were classified as non-cultivable. No forests, orchards, or pastures existed on village lands.

== Demographics ==
As of 2011, Nagwans had a population of 1,510, in 297 households. This population was 53.6% male (810) and 46.4% female (700). The 0-6 age group numbered 270 (137 male and 133 female), or 17.9% of the total population. 327 residents were members of Scheduled Castes, or 21.7% of the total.

== Infrastructure ==
As of 2011, Nagwans had 3 primary schools; it did not have any kind of healthcare facilities. Drinking water was provided by well and hand pump; there were no public toilets. The village had a public library but no post office; there was at least some access to electricity for residential purposes. Streets were made of both kachcha and pakka materials.

== Economy ==
The staple crop grown at Nagwans is the urad bean. The village does not host a weekly haat or regular market, and there is no bank or agricultural credit society.
