= Parichha =

- Census town
- Location in Uttar Pradesh, India Parichha (India)
- Coordinates: 25.52°N 78.75°E
- Country: India
- State: Uttar Pradesh
- District: Jhansi
- Elevation: 213 m (699 ft)

Population (2001)
  - Total: 6,849

Languages
  - Official: Hindi
- Time zone: UTC+5:30 (IST)
- Vehicle registration: UP 93
- Website: up.gov.in

Parichha is a census town in Jhansi district in the Indian state of Uttar Pradesh. It is located on Jhansi-Kanpur highway on the bank of Betwa River.

== Geography ==
Parichha is located at 25.52°N 78.75°E. It has an average elevation of 213 metres (698 feet).

== Places of interest ==
Parichha Dam is located on Betwa river, approximately 25 km from the city. It has a reservoir whose placid waters reach up to Notghat Bridge, located 34 km from Jhansi. The dam is a major destination for water sports, especially for those who love boating.

== Parichha Thermal Power Plant ==
Parichha Power houses a 1140 MW coal based power station. Workers of Parichha Thermal Power Plant stay in Parichha Colony.
