= Lower Lake (Bhopal) =

Lake in Bhopal, Madhya Pradesh, India

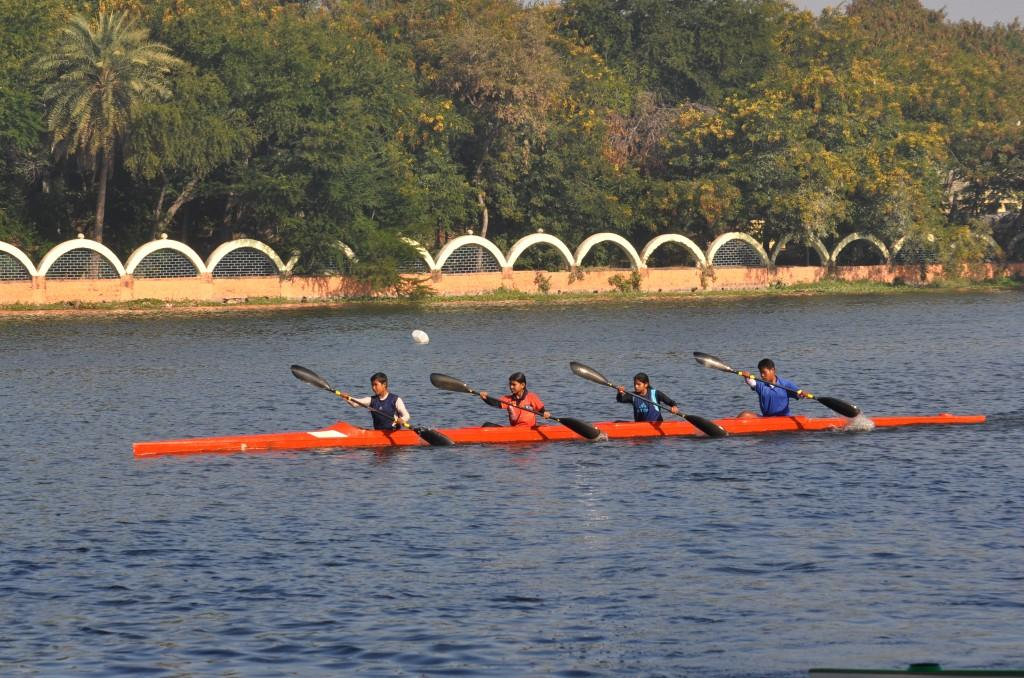
- Children kayaking on the Lower Lake

- Location of Bhopal's Lower Lake Lower Lake (India)
- Location: Bhopal, Madhya Pradesh, India
- Coordinates: 23°16′0″N 77°25′0″E
- Primary inflows: Seepage from Upper Lake and drainage from 28 sewage-filled nullahs
- Primary outflows: Halali River via Patra Drain
- Catchment area: 9.6 km^{2} (3.7 sq mi)
- Built: 1794
- Surface area: 1.29 km^{2} (0.50 sq mi) (2011)
- Average depth: 6.2 m (20 ft)
- Max. depth: 10.7 m (35 ft)
- References: International Lake Environment Committee

The Lower Lake or Chhota Talaab is a lake in Bhopal, the capital of Madhya Pradesh state of India. Along with the Bhojtal or Upper Lake, it forms the Bhoj Wetland.

== History ==
Location of Lower Lake in Bhopal

The lake was built by creating in 1794 to beautify the city. The construction was commissioned by Chote Khan, a minister of Nawab Hayat Muhammad Khan Bahadur. A number of earlier wells were merged in this lake. The lower lake is beside a bridge named 'Pul Pukhta'. The lower lake has also been mentioned as "Pukhta-Pul Talao" in literature.

== Geography ==
The Lower Lake is located to the east of the Upper Lake. An earthen dam separates the two lakes. The two lakes are built in a terraced manner, the lowest level of the Upper Lake is just below the highest level of the Lower Lake.

The Lower Lake has an area (water spread) of 1.29 , and its catchment area is 9.6 km^{2}. The lake receives subsurface seepage from the Upper Lake. In the 1850s, the maximum and minimum depths of the lake were 11.7 m and 6.16 m respectively. As of 2011, the maximum depth was 10.7m.

The Lower Lake does not have any fresh water source; it receives seepage water from the Upper Lake and drainage from 28 sewage-filled nullahs. It drains into the Patra rivulet, which joins Halali River, a small tributary of the Betwa River.

== Ecology and environmental issues ==
The Lower Lake is a constituent of the Bhoj Wetland, an internationally recognized Ramsar site. Despite its conservation status, the lake faces significant ecological stress due to its location within a dense urban catchment and its reliance on seepage from the Upper Lake.

=== Water quality and fish mortality ===
In 2025, a report by the Madhya Pradesh Pollution Control Board (MPPCB) categorized the water quality of Lower Lake under the 'C' category. This classification indicates that the water is suitable for use as a drinking water source only after conventional treatment and disinfection. The lake was identified as one of the most polluted water bodies in Bhopal, showing higher contamination levels than the Upper Lake.

The MPPCB analysis conducted between January and April 2025 found that a major pollutant in the lake is the presence of total coliforms exceeding designated limits. Authorities attributed this contamination to the inflow of untreated sewage and human excreta into the water body.

The lake's ecosystem is frequently impacted by low levels of dissolved oxygen (DO). In April and May 2025, mass fish mortality events were recorded, particularly near Khatlapura Ghat. The Madhya Pradesh Pollution Control Board (MPPCB) attributed these incidents to a combination of rising water temperatures and organic pollution, which reduce the water's capacity to hold oxygen. Environmental activists have noted that the decomposition of organic waste from untreated sewage and religious offerings further depletes oxygen levels, sometimes falling below 3 mg/L, which is insufficient to support diverse aquatic life.

=== Conservation and management ===
The lake is managed under the Wetland (Conservation and Management) Rules, 2017, which prohibit the dumping of solid waste and untreated discharge. For the 2025–26 fiscal year, the Bhopal Municipal Corporation (BMC) increased the lake conservation budget from ₹21 crore to ₹46 crore to address pollution and maintenance.

Under the National Plan for Conservation of Aquatic Ecosystems (NPCA), the Central Government sanctioned ₹432.03 lakhs for the Bhoj Wetland between 2018 and 2024 to support conservation activities. Current management strategies include the Jal-Ganga Samvardhan Yojana cleanup drive and proposals for real-time water quality monitoring using automated sensors.

The Lower Lake suffers from pollution due to drainage from sewage-filled nullahs, lack of fresh water source and commercial washing of clothes. The entire lake is eutrophic, and its water is not suitable for drinking.
