= Sukma Dukma Dam =

Coordinates: 25°11′23.83″N 78°32′34.73″E

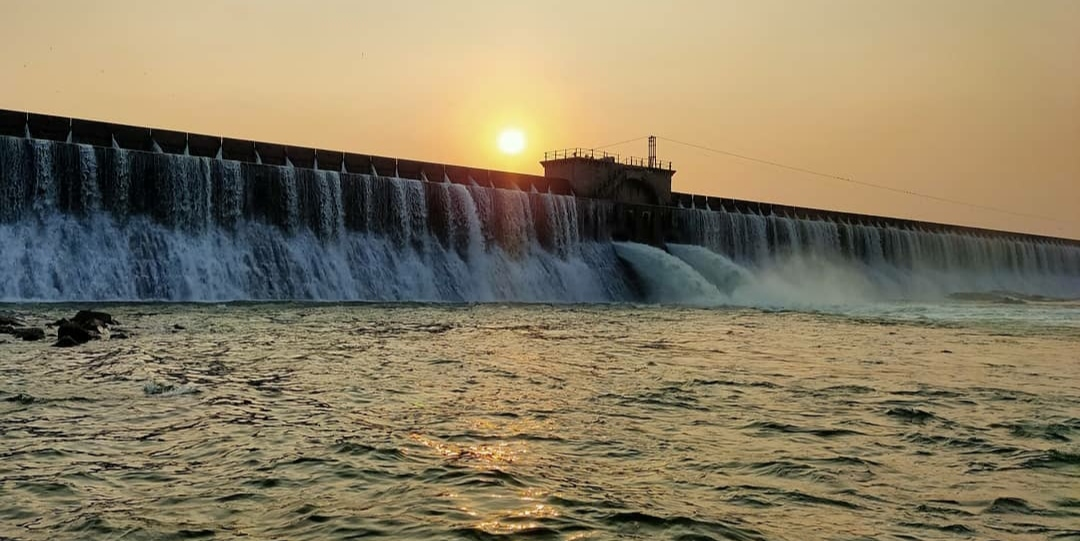

- Location within India
- Country: India
- Location: Uttar Pradesh

Dam and spillways
- Impounds: Sabari River

Sukma Dukma Dam is situated in Jhansi district, Uttar Pradesh, for irrigation and water supply. It is constructed across a tributary of the Yamuna River and plays a significant role in supporting agriculture in the surrounding regions.

== History ==
It was constructed between 1905 and 1909 on the Betwa River, a tributary of the Yamuna, it was built as a secondary dam to the Parichha Dam.
