= Int Khedichhap =

- village
- Location within Madhya Pradesh Location within India
- Coordinates: 23.227823°N 77.266650°E
- Country: India
- State: Madhya Pradesh
- District: Bhopal
- Tehsil: Huzur

Population (2011)
  - Total: 885
- Time zone: UTC+5:30 (IST)
- ISO 3166 code: MP-IN
- Census code: 482482

Int Khedichhap is a village in the Bhopal district of Madhya Pradesh, India. It is located in the Huzur tehsil. It is located on the south-western shore of the Upper Lake.

== Demographics ==
According to the 2011 census of India, Int Khedichhap has 154 households. The effective literacy rate (i.e. the literacy rate of population excluding children aged 6 and below) is 77.25%.

Demographics (2011 Census)
	Total	Male	Female
Population	885	460	425
Children aged below 6 years	85	42	43
Scheduled caste	80	43	37
Scheduled tribe	0	0	0
Literates	618	356	262
Workers (all)	255	225	30
Main workers (total)	251	224	27
Main workers: Cultivators	158	152	6
Main workers: Agricultural labourers	67	49	18
Main workers: Household industry workers	1	1	0
Main workers: Other	25	22	3
Marginal workers (total)	4	1	3
Marginal workers: Cultivators	2	1	1
Marginal workers: Agricultural labourers	2	0	2
Marginal workers: Household industry workers	0	0	0
Marginal workers: Others	0	0	0
Non-workers	630	235	395
