= Lower Lake =

Lower Lake may refer to:

- Lower Lake, California, a census-designated place in the United States
- Lower Lake, Bhopal, a lake in India
- Lower Lake, an artificial lake near Sardis Lake, Mississippi

== See also ==
- Untersee, a lake part of Lake Constance
