= Parichha Thermal Power Station =

Power station in Uttar Pradesh, India

Parichha Thermal Power Station is located at Parichha in Jhansi district in the Indian state of Uttar Pradesh, about 25 km from Jhansi on the bank of Betwa river. The power plant is owned and operated by Uttar Pradesh Rajya Vidyut Utpadan Nigam which is a state enterprise.

== Operations ==
The plant has two stages, having 6 units altogether. The machinery is from Bharat Heavy Electricals Limited, M/s ABB, M/s Alstom, M/s Yokogawa. The coal to all these units is fed from coal mines of Bharat Coking Coal Limited and Eastern Coalfields Limited via rail.

All the units of this station are coal-fired thermal power plants, having a total generating capacity of 1140 MW and consisting of the following units -

Stage	Units No.	Installed Capacity	Derated Capacity	Date of Synchronization	Date of Commercial Operation	Original Equipment Manufacturers
1	01	110 MW (LMZ MODEL)	110	31.03.1984	01.10.1985	M/s Bharat Heavy Electricals Limited, India.
2	02	110 MW (LMZ MODEL)	110	31.03.1984	Dec.1984	M/s Bharat Heavy Electricals Limited, India.
3	03	210 MW (KWU MODEL)	210	May.2006	24.11.2006	M/s Bharat Heavy Electricals Limited, India.
4	04	210 MW (KWU MODEL)	210	28.12.2006	01.12.2007	M/s Bharat Heavy Electricals Limited, India.
5	05	250 MW (KWU MODEL)	250	15.05.2012	17.07.2012	M/s Bharat Heavy Electricals Limited, India.
6	06	250 MW (KWU MODEL)	250	17.09.2012	18.04.2013	M/s Bharat Heavy Electricals Limited, India.

The coal to all these units is fed from coal mines of BCCL, ECL by means of railways.

== Capacity ==
Parichha Thermal Power Station has a capacity of 1140 MW; 2 units of 110 MW, 2 units of 210 MW and 2 units of 250 MW. Its sixth unit of 250 MW was commissioned in April 2013 taking the total installed capacity to 1140 MW. It is connected to the national grid through NRLDC Delhi.

Stage	Unit Number	Installed Capacity (MW)	Status
1	1	110	permanently closed
1	2	110	Permanently closed
2	3	210	Running
2	4	210	Running
3	5	250	Running
3	6	250	Running

== See also ==
- Parichha Dam
