= Dhurwara Dam =

Proposed dam in India

- Status: Proposed

Dam and spillways
- Impounds: Betwa River

Dhurwara Dam is a proposed dam on the Betwa River in district Lalitpur, Uttar Pradesh.
