= Kolu Khedi, Huzur =

Kolu Khedi
- village
- Location within Madhya Pradesh Location within India
- Coordinates: 23.254417°N 77.276137°E
- Country: India
- State: Madhya Pradesh
- District: Bhopal
- Tehsil: Huzur

Population (2011)
  - Total: 1,423
- Time zone: UTC+5:30 (IST)
- ISO 3166 code: MP-IN
- Census code: 482465

Kolu Khedi is a village in the Bhopal district of Madhya Pradesh, India. It is located in the Huzur tehsil and the Phanda block, beside Upper Lake. The nearest railway station is Bakanian Bhaunr.

It is the ancestral village of the politician Najma Heptulla.

== Demographics ==
According to the 2011 census of India, Kolu Khedi has 323 households. The effective literacy rate (i.e. the literacy rate of population excluding children aged 6 and below) is 88.42%.

Demographics (2011 Census)
	Total	Male	Female
Population	1423	782	641
Children aged below 6 years	188	102	86
Scheduled caste	331	172	159
Scheduled tribe	0	0	0
Literates	1092	654	438
Workers (all)	664	397	267
Main workers (total)	546	330	216
Main workers: Cultivators	256	151	105
Main workers: Agricultural labourers	221	119	102
Main workers: Household industry workers	9	8	1
Main workers: Other	60	52	8
Marginal workers (total)	118	67	51
Marginal workers: Cultivators	9	4	5
Marginal workers: Agricultural labourers	50	21	29
Marginal workers: Household industry workers	1	0	1
Marginal workers: Others	58	42	16
Non-workers	759	385	374
