= Kisalwans =

Village in Uttar Pradesh, India

- Village
- Location in Uttar Pradesh, India
- Coordinates: 24.85198°N 78.21441°E
- Country: India
- State: Uttar Pradesh
- District: Lalitpur
- Tehsil: Lalitpur

Area
  - Total: 9.434 km^{2} (3.642 sq mi)

Population (2011)
  - Total: 2,552
  - Density: 270.5/km^{2} (700.6/sq mi)
- Time zone: UTC+5:30 (IST)
- PIN: 284124

Kisalwans is a village in Jakhaura block of Lalitpur district, Uttar Pradesh, India. As of 2011, it had a population of 2,552 people, in 447 households.

== Name ==
According to Paul Whalley, the suffix -wāns in Kisalwāns is a variant form of the suffix -bās, ultimately from Sanskrit vāsa, meaning "dwelling". The variant -wāns is common in Lalitpur district; other examples are Nagwans, Satarwans, Satwansa, Kurwans, and Khitwans.

== Geography ==
According to the 2011 census, Kisalwans has a total area of 943.4 hectares, of which 609.3 were currently farmland and 113.5 were under non-agricultural use. 84.8 hectares were classified as cultivable but not currently under any agricultural use, and 0 were classified as non-cultivable. 56.8 hectares were forested. No orchards, or pastures existed on village lands.

== Demographics ==
As of 2011, Kisalwans had a population of 2,552, in 447 households. This population was 53.1% male (1,355) and 46.9% female (1,197). The 0-6 age group numbered 454 (240 male and 214 female), or 17.8% of the total population. 193 residents were members of Scheduled Castes, or 7.6% of the total.

== Infrastructure ==
As of 2011, Kisalwans had 2 primary schools and 1 primary health centre. Drinking water was provided by well and hand pump; there were no public toilets. The village had a sub post office but no public library; there was at least some access to electricity for domestic and commercial purposes. Streets were made of both kachcha and pakka materials.
