= Rajghat Dam =

- Official name: RAJGHAT Hydel power station
- Location: Ashok Nagar District, Madhya Pradesh
- Coordinates: 24°45′46″N 78°14′02″E
- Purpose: hydel power generation
- Status: running
- Construction began: 1975
- Opening date: 2006
- Owner(s): Madhya pradesh power generating company ltd
- Operator(s): Madhya pradesh power generating company ltd

Dam and spillways
- Impounds: Betwa River
- Height: 43.8 m
- Length: 11200 m

Reservoir
- Creates: Rajghat Reservoir

mppgcl
- Operator(s): mppgcl
- Type: hydro electric
- Installed capacity: 3*15 MW
- Website http://www.mppgcl.mp.gov.in/hydel-generation.html

The Rajghat Dam (also known as Rani Laxmi Bai Dam) is a water reservoir and inter-state dam project of the governments of Madhya Pradesh and Uttar Pradesh on the Betwa River. It is located 14 km from Chanderi in Madhya Pradesh, 22 km from Lalitpur in Uttar Pradesh and 55 km from Deogarh also in Uttar Pradesh.

== Construction ==
Catchment Area - 472 km^{2}

Total Capacity - 96 million m^{3}

Height - 73.3 metres

Length - 573.29 metres

Power Generation Capacity - 45 MW (3x15 MW)

Number of Spillway Gates - 18

Spillway Type - Ogee
