= Matatila Dam =

Dam in Uttar Pradesh, India

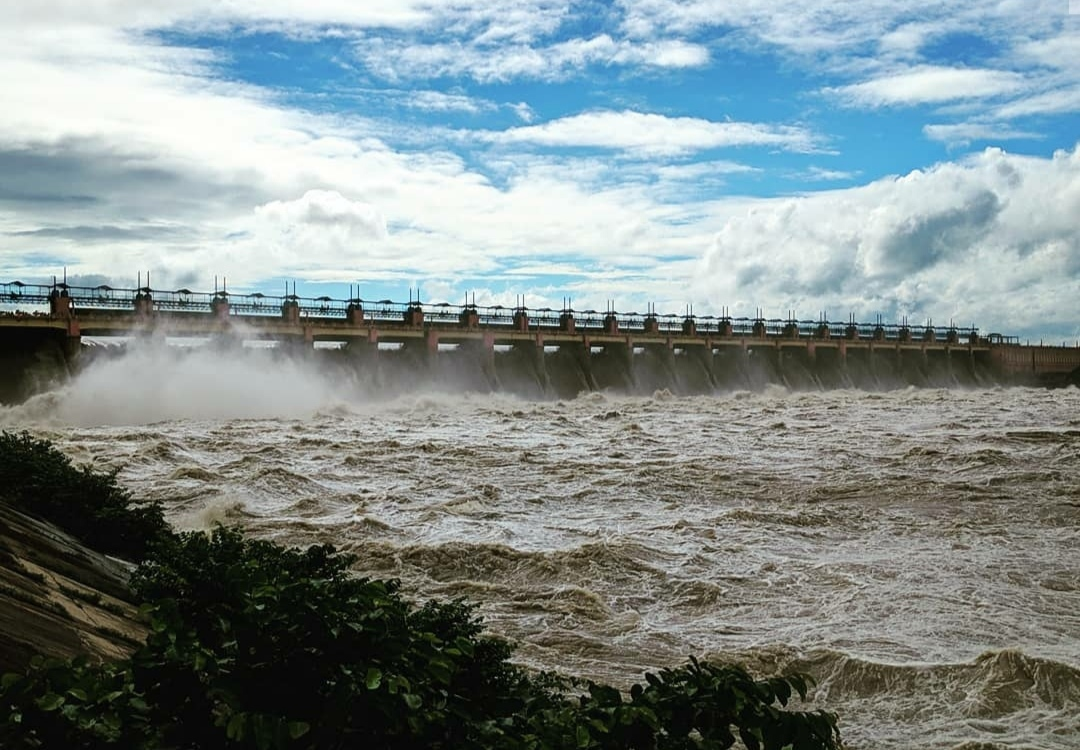

- Location within Uttar Pradesh Location within India
- Coordinates: 25.1007121°N 78.3749048°E
- Opening date: 1958

Dam and spillways
- Impounds: Betwa River
- Length: 6,300 m

Reservoir
- Creates: Matatila Reservoir

Matalila Power House
- Commission date: 1965
- Turbines: 3×11MW
- Installed capacity: 33 MW

The Matatila Dam is a dam in district Lalitpur, Uttar Pradesh, India, that was built in 1958 on the Betwa River. Situated 50 km from Jhansi and 93 km away from Deogarh, this earthen dam is 35 m high. The dam has 23 Spillway gates. The catchment area is around 20 km^{2} with a maximum storage capacity of 1132 million cubic metres.

The dam is popular among tourists. Water sports facilities are also available. The best period to visit this place is from September to May. It connects Jhansi to Babina route.

The dam generates about 45 MW of power.

Nearest railway stations are at Matatila, Talbahat (10 km) and Lalitpur, Uttar Pradesh (40 km).

== Construction ==
It is believed that, before the dam's construction, there was a seat of “Mata Sharda” on top of the hill. People worshipped the hill. Later, the hill was renamed as Matatila. “Mata” is for Goddess Sharda and “tila” means “top.” When the dam was constructed here it was given the same name, Matatila Dam.

Matatila Dam was built in 1958. It is an earthen dam with a height of 35 meters.

Power Station of the dam is located at the left bank of the River Betwa. The river originates from Bhopal and passes through the outskirts of Jhansi, forming a border line of the states of Uttar Pradesh and Madhya Pradesh. Then, it flows mostly in Uttar Pradesh. Here, it meets the River Yamuna in Hamirpur district.

The River is completely rain fed. It features high water discharge during monsoon and very low water discharge during summer. The Matatila Power House features three machines of 10.2 MW each. It was set up in 1965.

The catchment area of Matatila Dam is 8000 square miles. Its reservoir capacity is at 4000 M.Cu.Ft.

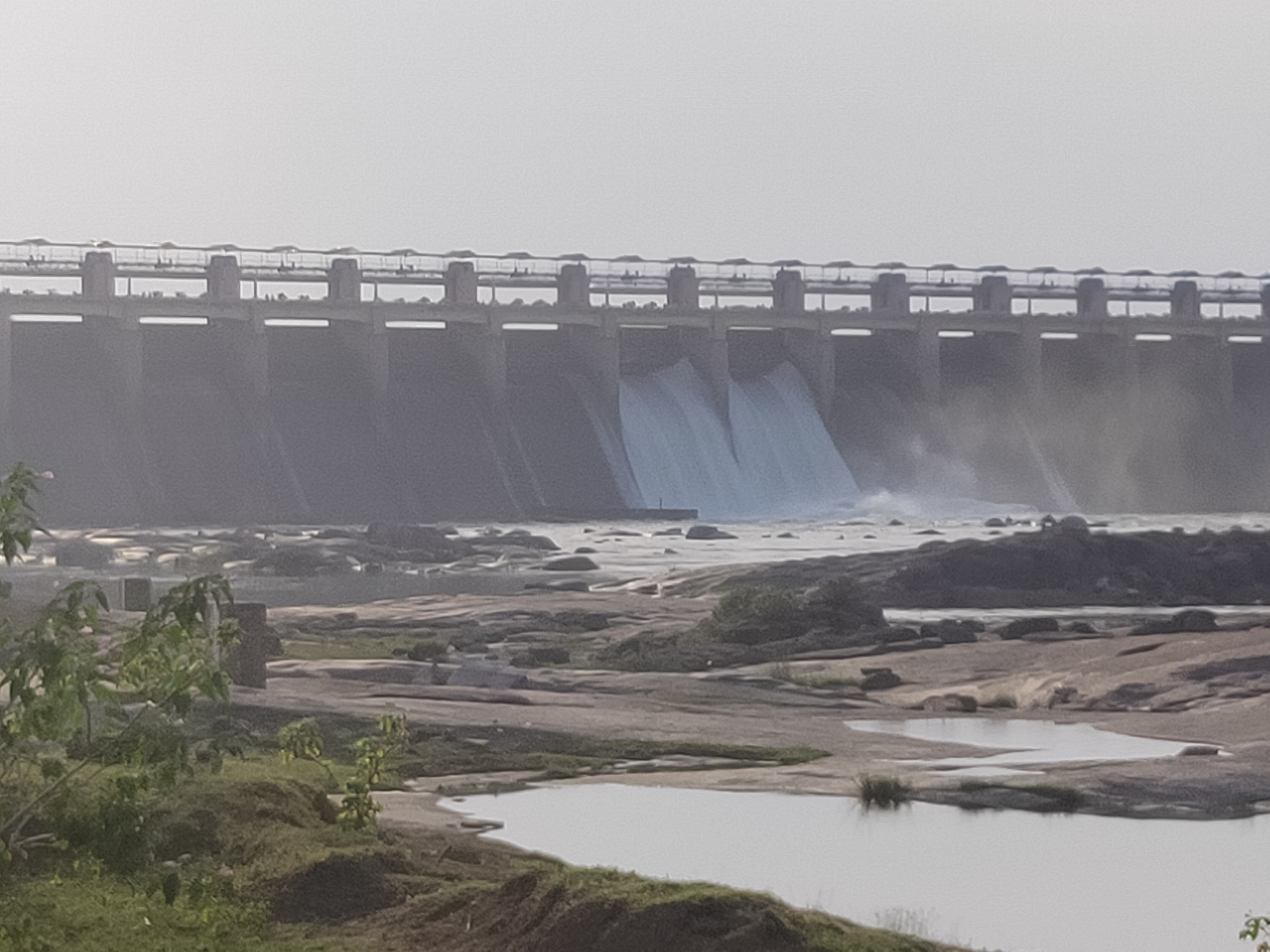
420pxMatatila Dam Lalitpur

== Economy ==
Matatila Dam was constructed for dual purposes – irrigation and production of hydro electric power.

The dam is built with a capacity to produce 30.6 MW hydro electricity. For this purpose, both flanks of the dam feature robust structural support to ensure ample water discharge force during the time of releasing water and operating heavy duty turbine engines.

Each unit of the power plant has a capacity to produce 10.2 MW electricity. Three hydro machines are installed at the dam. The method of electricity production is direct release of water.

== Best Time to Visit ==
The best time to visit Matatila Dam is from September to May. Summers are hot with temperatures reaching up to 50 degree Celsius at times. Winters are too cold. Sometimes, it rains in the summer; otherwise the weather here is dry throughout the year.

== How to Reach ==
Nearby cities from Matatila Dam are Talbehat, Pichhore, Shivpuri, and Babina. The nearest railway station from this Dam is Talbehat, which is 10 km. It is a busy station. The other two nearby stations are Jakhlaun, which is 13 km, and Lalitpur, which is 23 km.

Matatila Dam is located about 93 km from Deogarh and 50 km from Jhansi City. Tourists coming from Delhi-Bombay route find Jhansi as the nearest railway station to this dam.
