= Bhojtal =

Lake in Madhya Pradesh, India

Bhopal
- Upper Lake
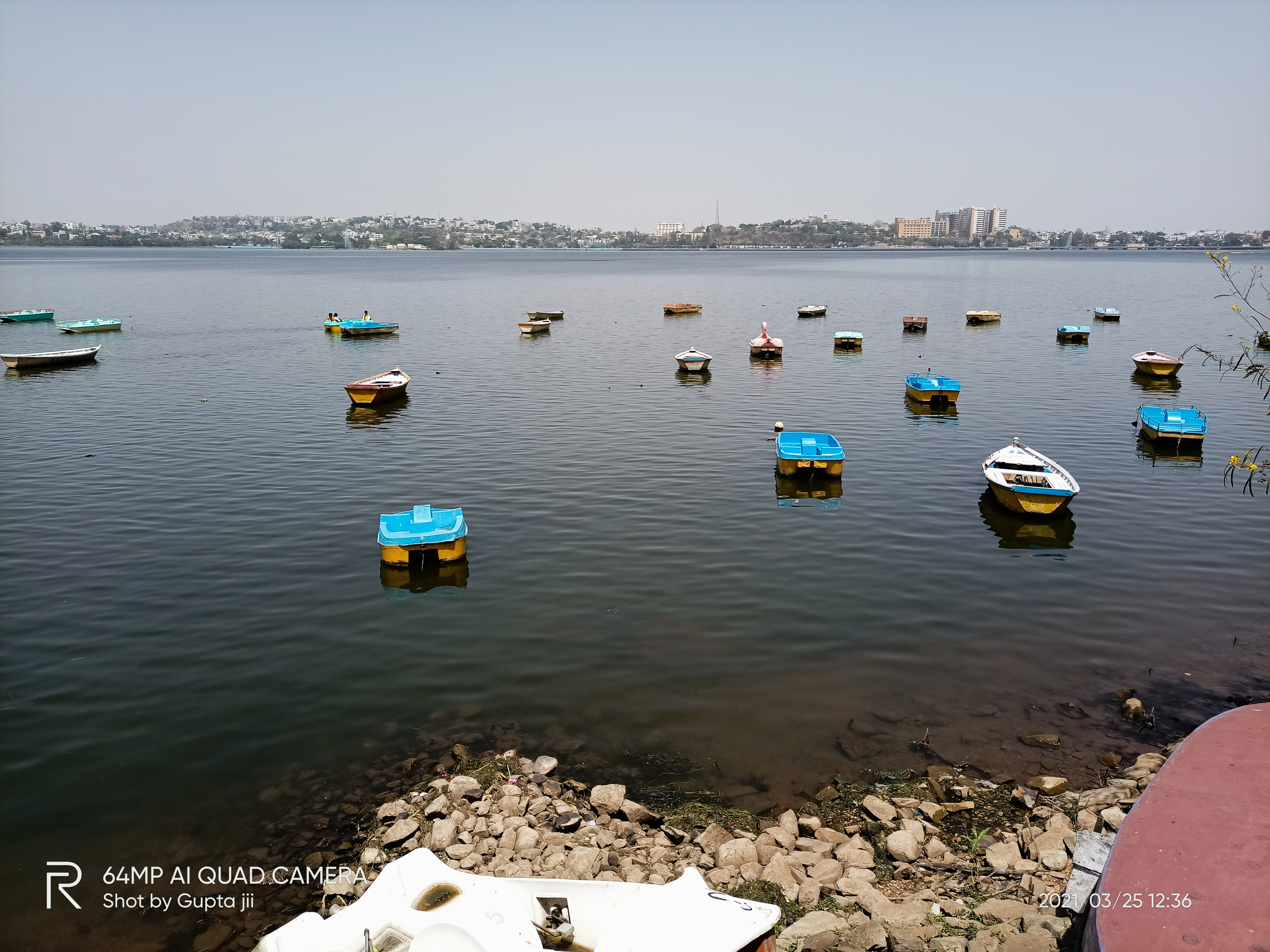
- Boats on the Upper Lake

- Location of Upper Lake in Bhopal
- Location: Madhya Pradesh, Bhopal
- Coordinates: 23.25°N 77.34°E
- Primary inflows: Kolans River
- Catchment area: 361 km^{2} (139 sq mi)
- Basin countries: India
- Max. length: 31.5 km (19.6 mi)
- Max. width: 5 km (3.1 mi)
- Surface area: 31 km^{2} (12 sq mi)
- Settlements: Bhopal

Bhojtal, also known as Upper Lake, is a large lake which lies on the western side of the capital city of Madhya Pradesh, Bhopal, India. It is a major source of drinking water for the residents of the city, serving around 40% of the residents with nearly 30 million imperial gallons (140,000 m^{3}) of water per day. Upper Lake, along with the nearby Lower Lake, constitute the Bhoj Wetland, which is now a Ramsar site.

== History ==
According to the local folklore, Bhojtal is said to have been built by the Paramara Raja Bhoj during his tenure as a king of Malwa (1005–1055). He is also said to have established the city of Bhopal (also named after him, then as Bhojpal) to secure the eastern frontier of his kingdom. There is a legend why they built the lake. Once king Bhoj suffered from skin disease and all Vaidyas (Doctors) failed to cure him. Then, one day a saint told the king to build a tank to combine 365 tributaries and then have a bath in it to wipe out the skin disease. Bhoj called upon his engineers to build up a huge tank. They spotted a place near river Betwa, which was 32 km away from Bhopal. It was found that it has only 359 tributaries. A Gond Commander Kalia fulfilled this shortage. He then gave the address of an invisible river. After merging the tributaries of this river the number 365 was completed.

The lake was created by constructing an earthen dam across the Kolans River. An eleven gate dam called the Bhadbhada dam was constructed at Bhadbhada in 1965 at the southeast corner of the Lake, and now controls the outflow to the river Kaliasote.

The lake was known as the Upper Lake or Bada Talab ("Big Pond") until March 2011 it was renamed to Bhojtaal in honour of the Great King Raja Bhoj who built it. A huge statue of Raja Bhoj, standing with sword, was also installed on a pillar on one corner of the lake to cement the name of Bhopal as the city of lakes

== Geography ==
Bhojtal is situated on the west central part of Bhopal city and is surrounded by Van Vihar National Park on the south, human settlements on the east and north, and agriculture fields on the west. It has an area of 31 km^{2}, and drains a catchment or watershed of 361 km^{2}. The watershed of the Upper Lake is mostly rural, with some urbanized areas around its eastern end. The Kolans was formerly a tributary of the Halali River, but with the creation of the lake using an earthen dam and a diversion channel, the upper reach of the Kolans River and Bada Talaab now drain into the Kaliasote River.

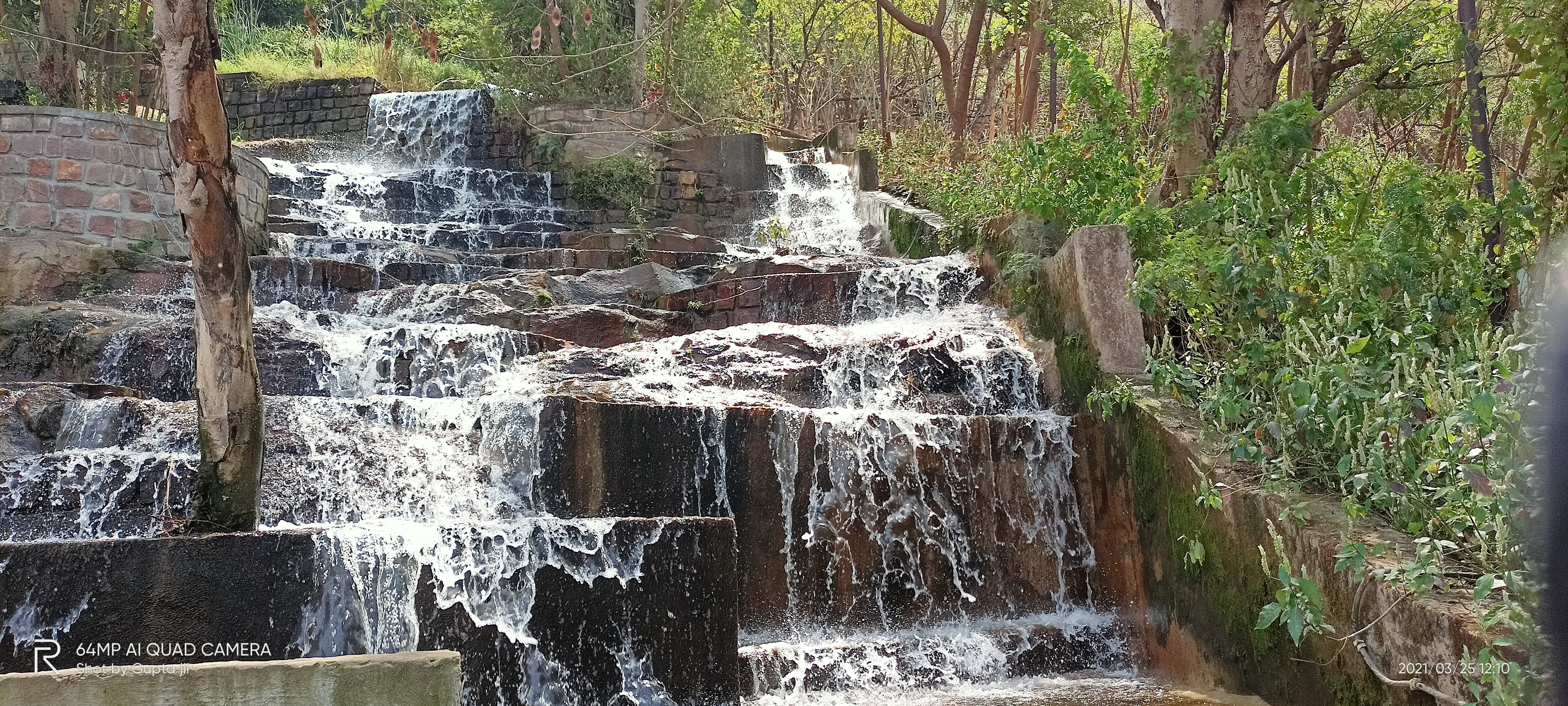
A small water fall near Upper Lake

== Social and cultural significance ==
Since the construction of the lake in the 11th century, Bhopal city has grown around it. The people are religiously and culturally attached to the lakes. The lakes meet their needs of water supply and they wash clothes in them (very harmful for the lake ecosystem), cultivate water chestnut in Bhojtal and lotus in Chhota Talaab. The idols of gods and goddesses are also immersed in the lake during religious festivals, though the local administration is advising devotees not to do so. The Takia island in Upper lake has a tomb of the Shah Ali Shah, which has religious and archaeological significance.

== Economy and entertainment ==
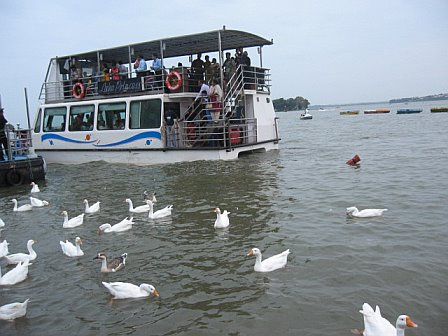
Tourists in Bhojtal

The fishing rights to Bhopal have been given on long lease by the Bhopal Municipal Corporation to a co-operative consisting of some 500 fishermen families. Fishing is mainly done on its south-eastern shores. The lake also serves as the source of water for irrigating a large area. There are 87 villages in its catchment area in the Bhopal as well as Sehore districts. Agriculture is the main source of livelihood for people in these areas and most farmers have livestock as well. While some farmers have large landholdings, many farmers are small and marginal farmers with only a few acres of land.

Bhojtal attracts tourists due to its scenery. The National Sailing School was established at the Boat Club on its eastern side. This club offers various water sports such as kayaking, canoeing, rafting, water skiing, parasailing etc. A number of operators provide facilities for exciting trips by sail, paddle and motor boats. Van Vihar National Park, situated on the south-eastern side of the lake, attracts tourists. The road passing through it has on one side the animals in their natural habitats, and on the other side is the lake.

The other major attraction close to the lake is the Bhopal Zoo on the bank of the lake. The zoo is kept in quite natural way.

== Biodiversity ==
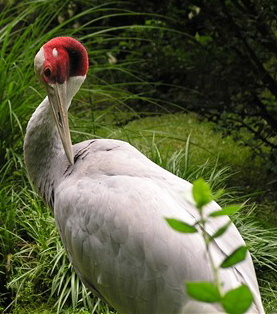
Indian sarus crane

The two lakes support flora and fauna. White stork, blacknecked stork, bareheaded goose, spoonbill etc., that have been rare sightings in the past, have started appearing. A recent phenomenon is the gathering of 100-120 sarus cranes in the lake. The largest bird of India, sarus crane (Grus antigone) is known for its size, majestic flight and lifetime pairing.

=== Flora ===
106 species of Macrophytes (belonging to 87 genera of 46 families), which includes 14 rare species and 208 species of Phytoplankton comprising 106 species of Chlorophyceae, 37 species of Cyano phyceae, 34 species of Euglenophyceae, 27 species of Bacilariophyceae and 4 species of Dinophyceae.

=== Fauna ===
105 species of zooplanktons, which includes (Rotifera 41, Protozoa 10, Cladocera 14, Copepoda 5, Ostracoda 9, Coleoptera 11, and Diptera 25). There are 43 species of fish (natural and cultured), 27 kinds of birds, 98 species of insect and more than 10 species of reptiles and amphibians (including 5 species of tortoise).

== Threat ==
The lake is shrinking and being polluted due to human activities in recent times. The waste and drainage generated by nearby city of Bhopal is dumped in lake affecting its ecology.

== Gallery ==
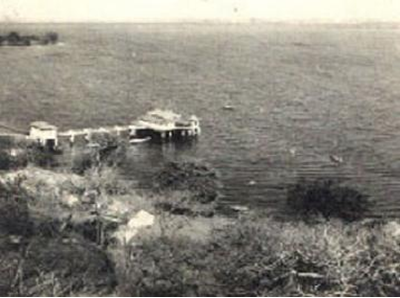
Bhojtal 1961 with Yacht club

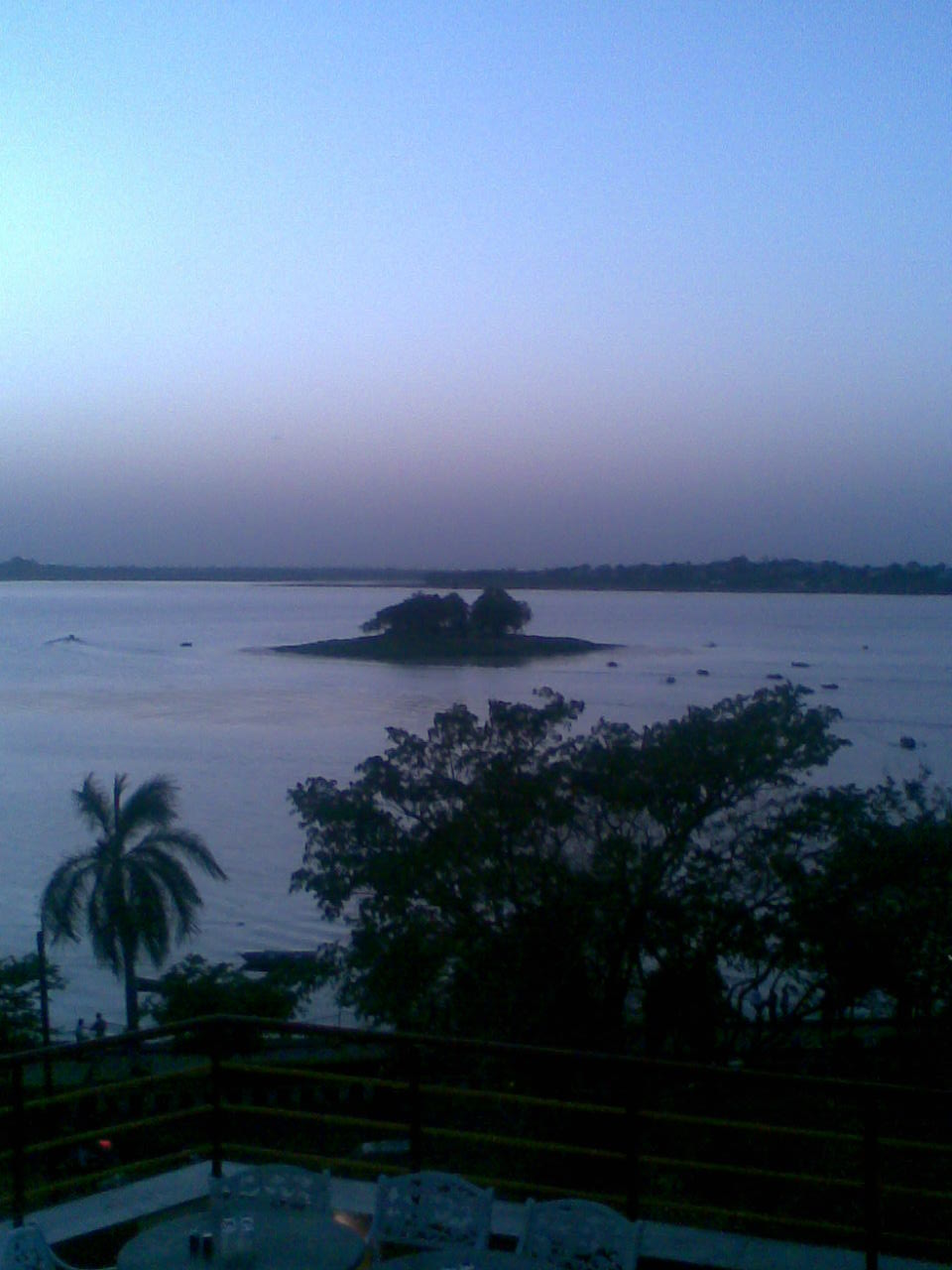
Takia Taapu and Bhojtal.

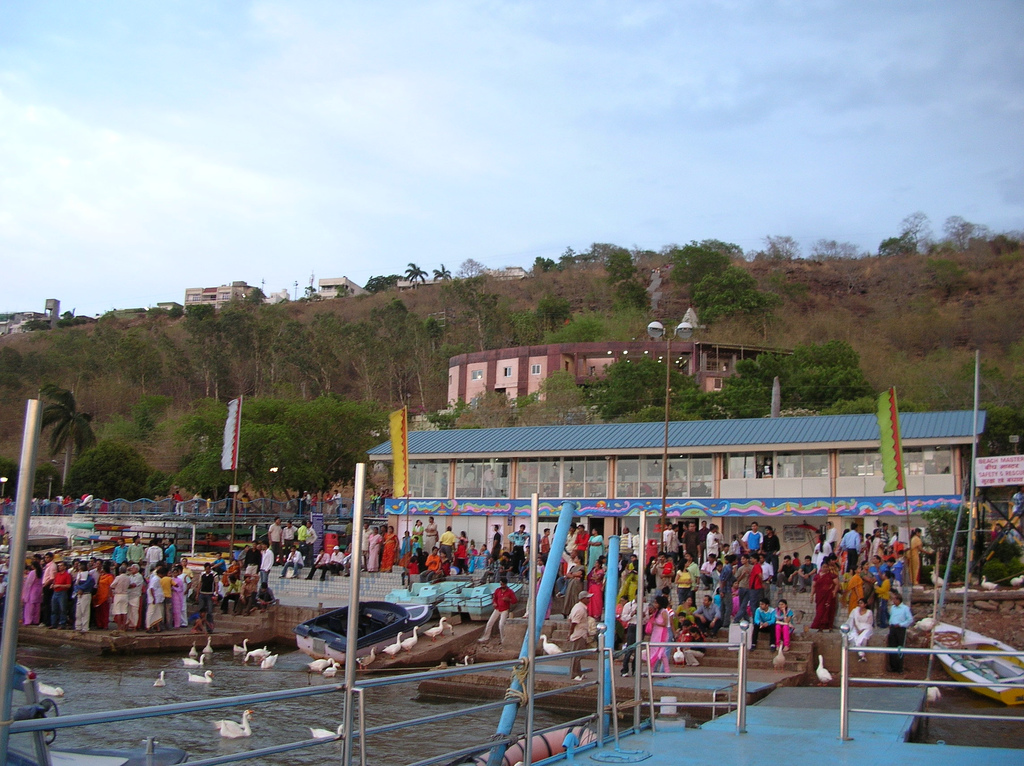
Situated at the Bhojtal, the Boat Club offers facilities for various water sports and tourism.

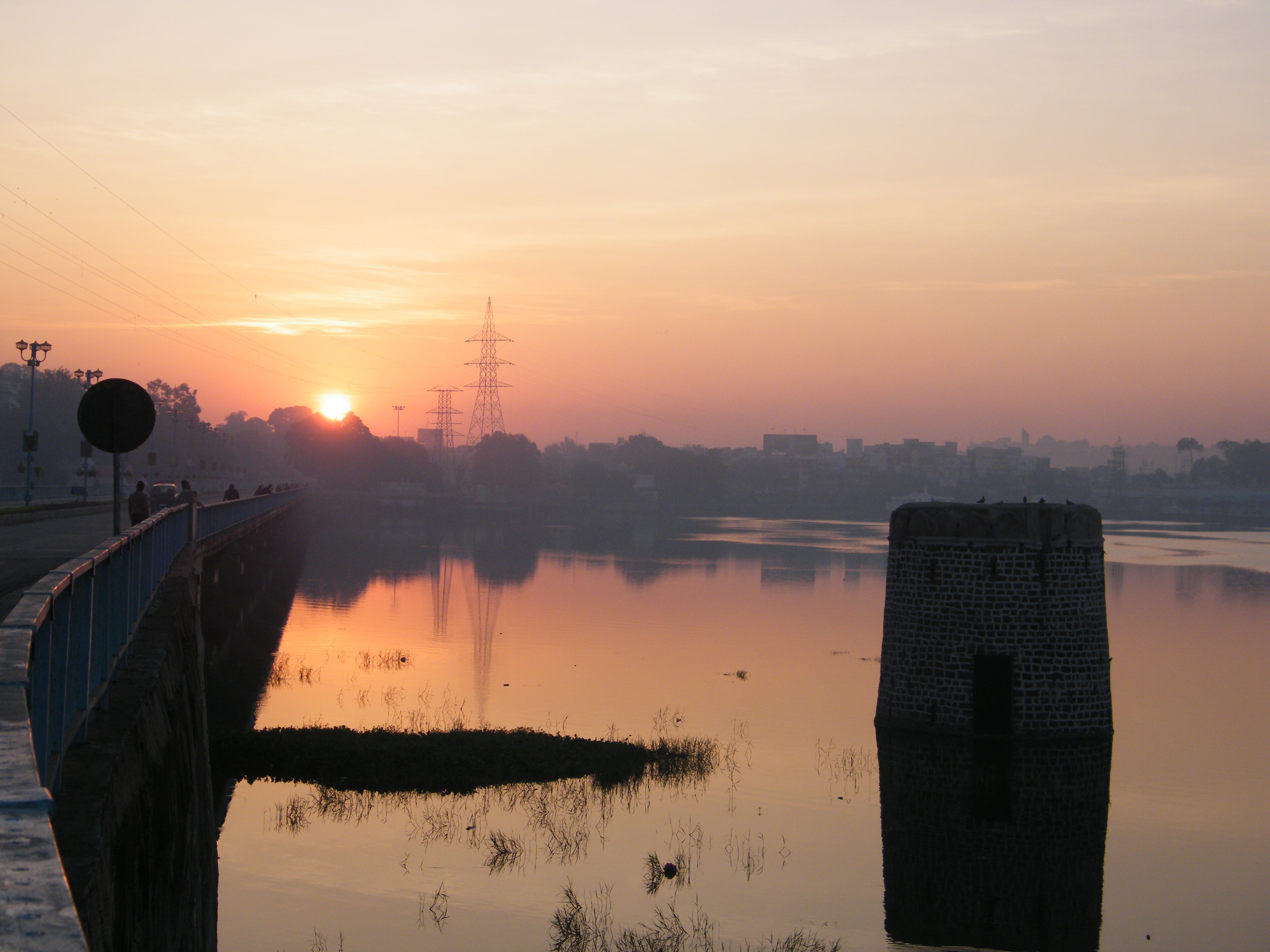
VIP Road and Bhojtal.

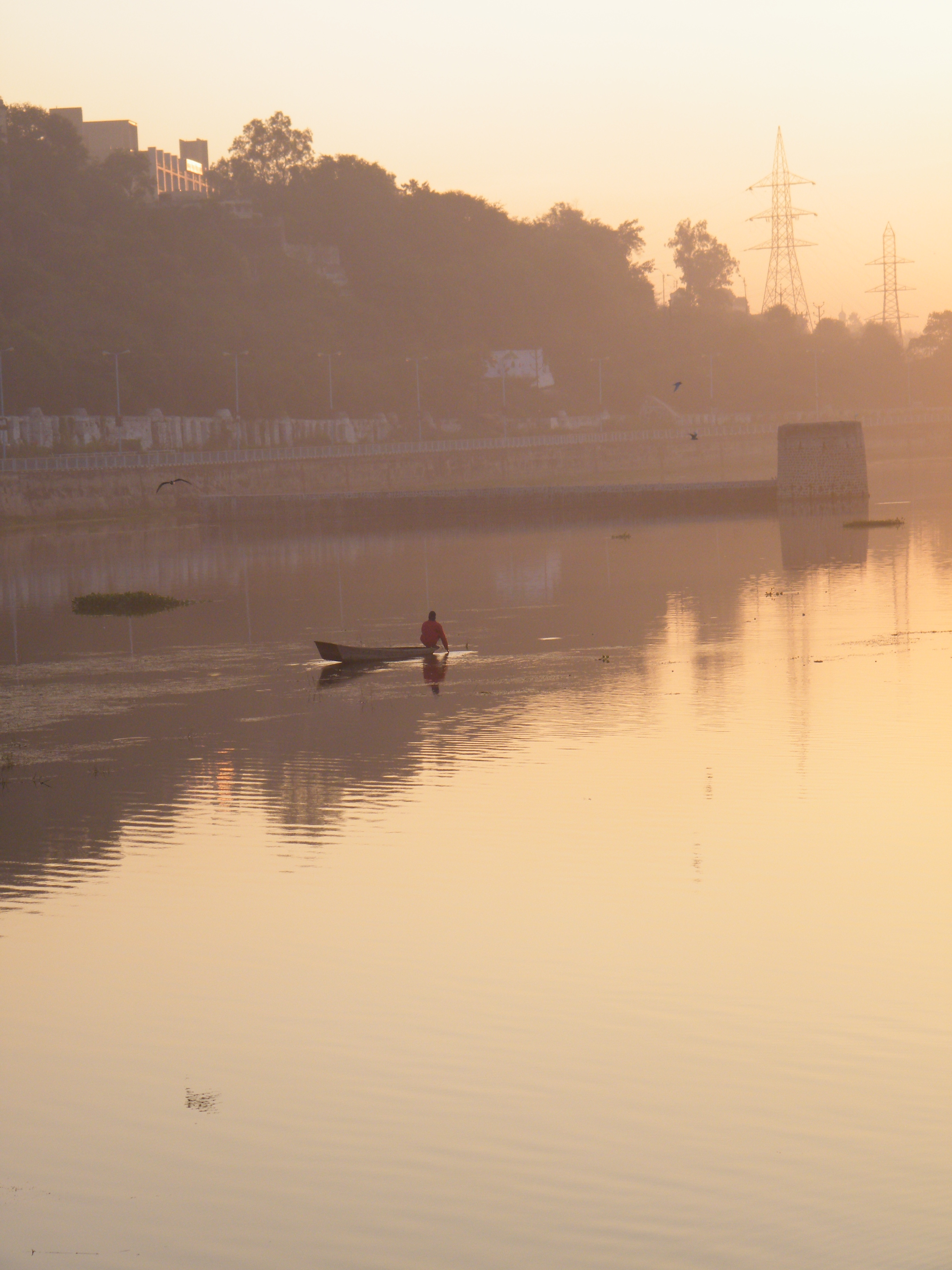
A view of the Bhojtal & Raja Bhoj Road.

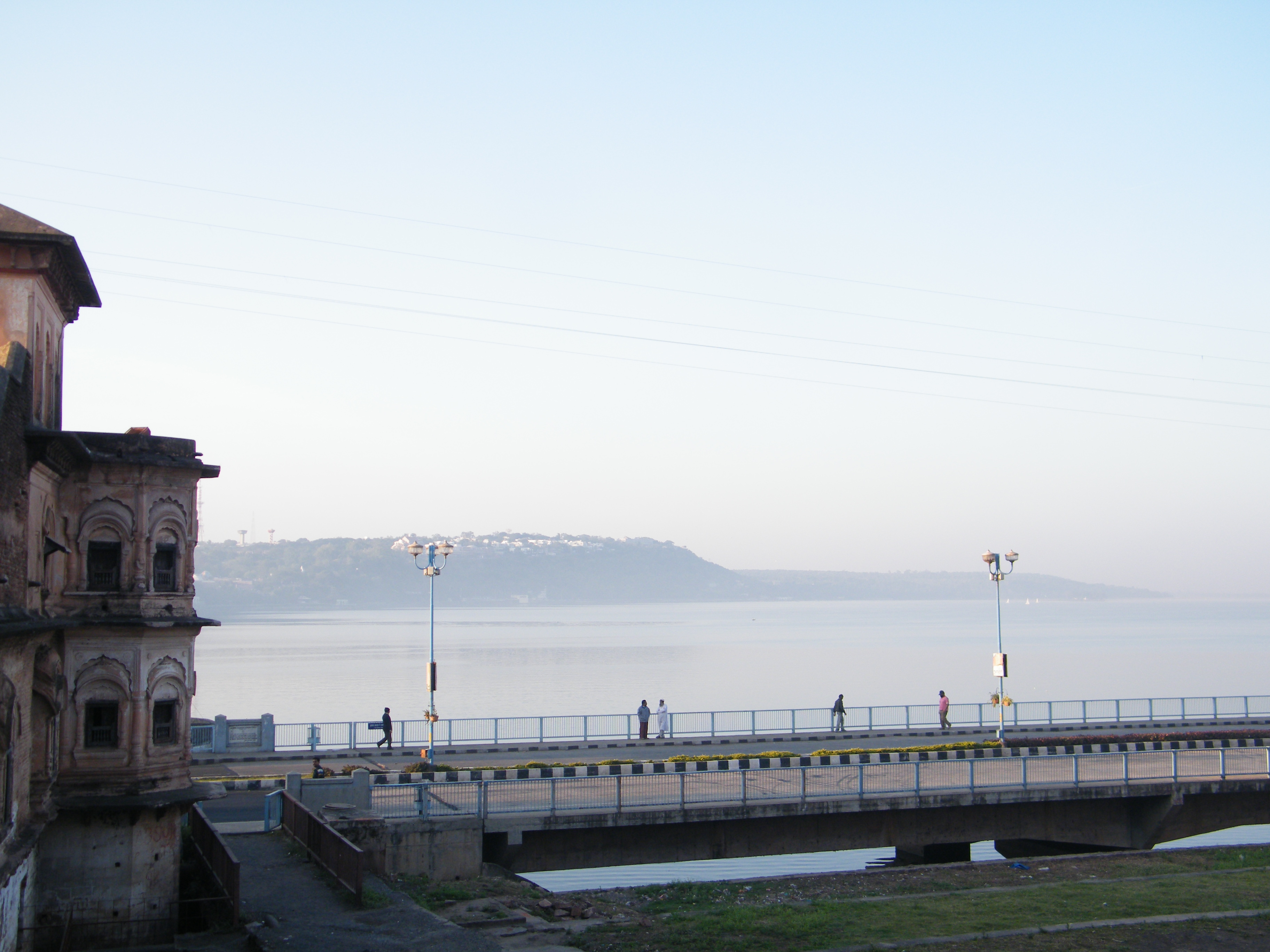
Gohar Mahal Near Bhojtal.

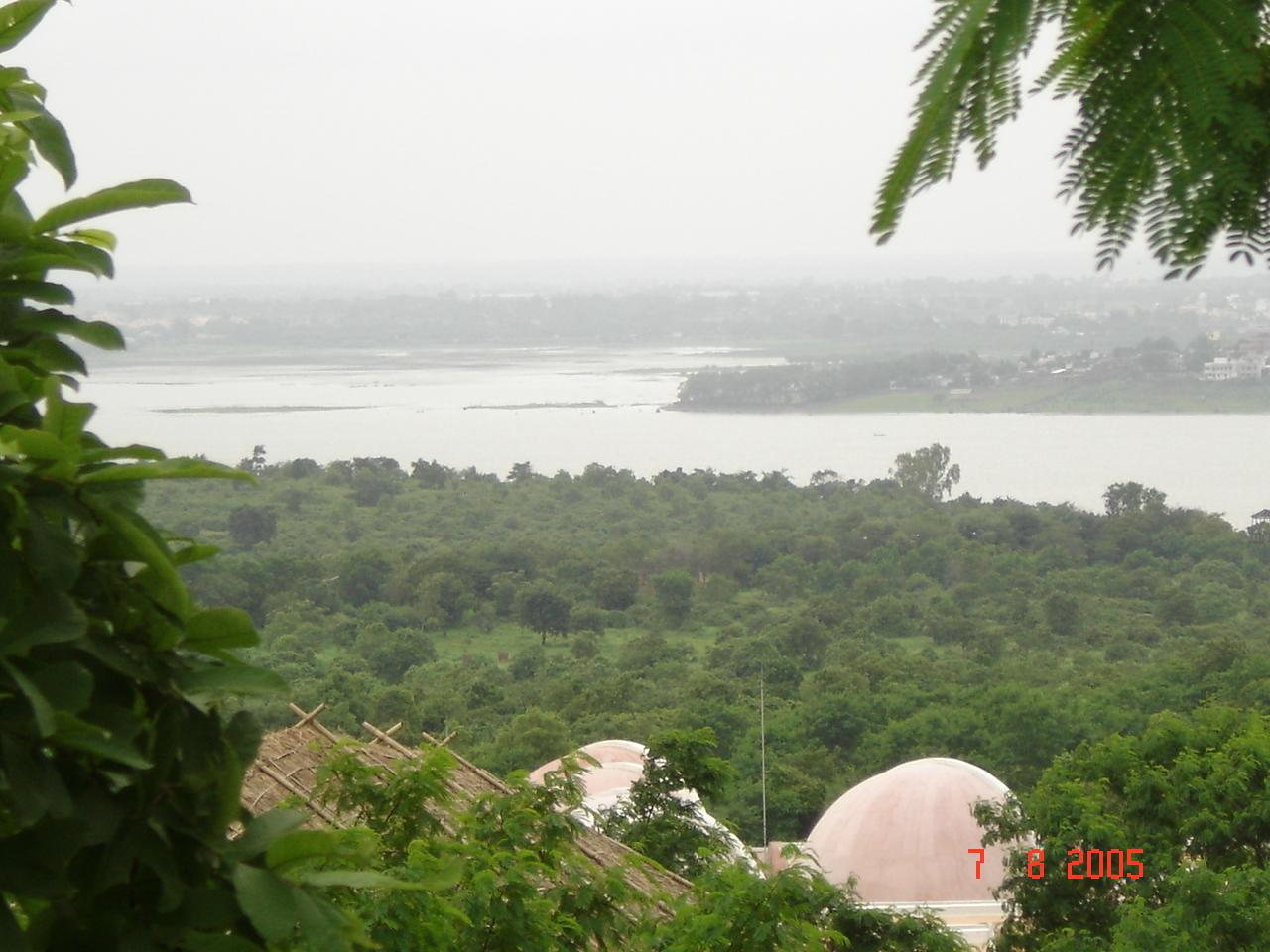
Bhojtal as viewed from Manav Sangrahalaya.

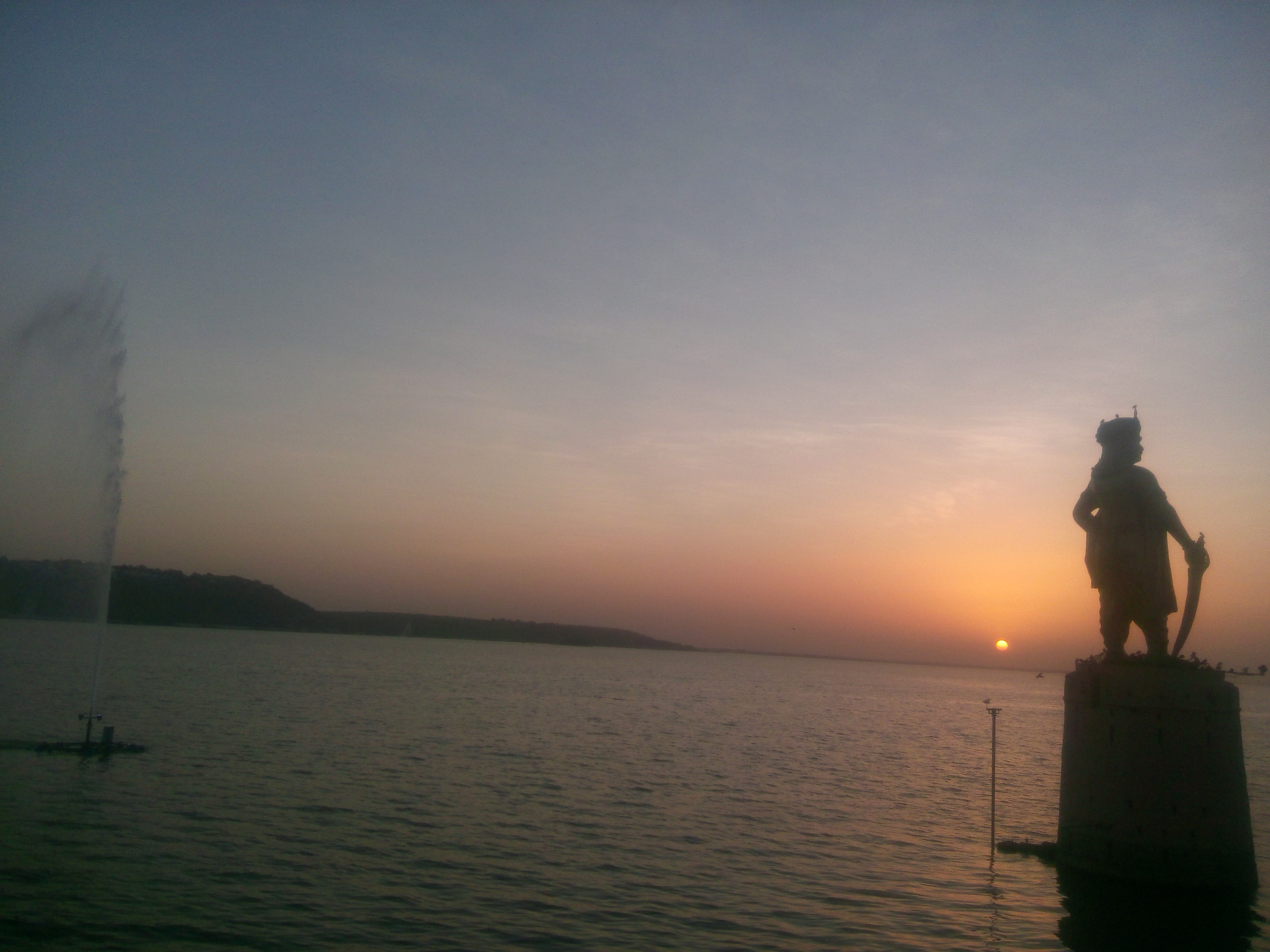
Bhojtal and Raja Bhoj Statue

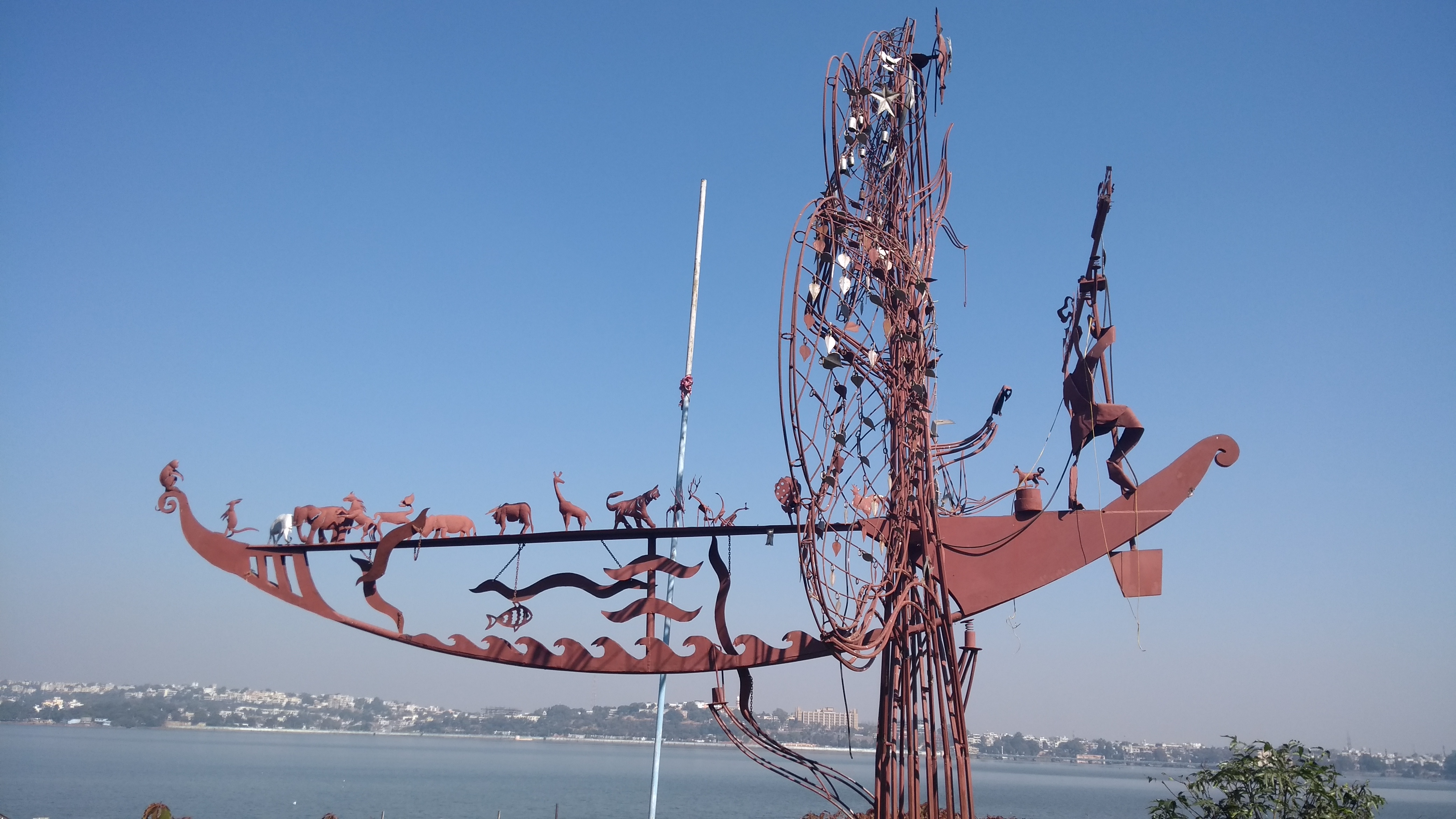
Noha Installation

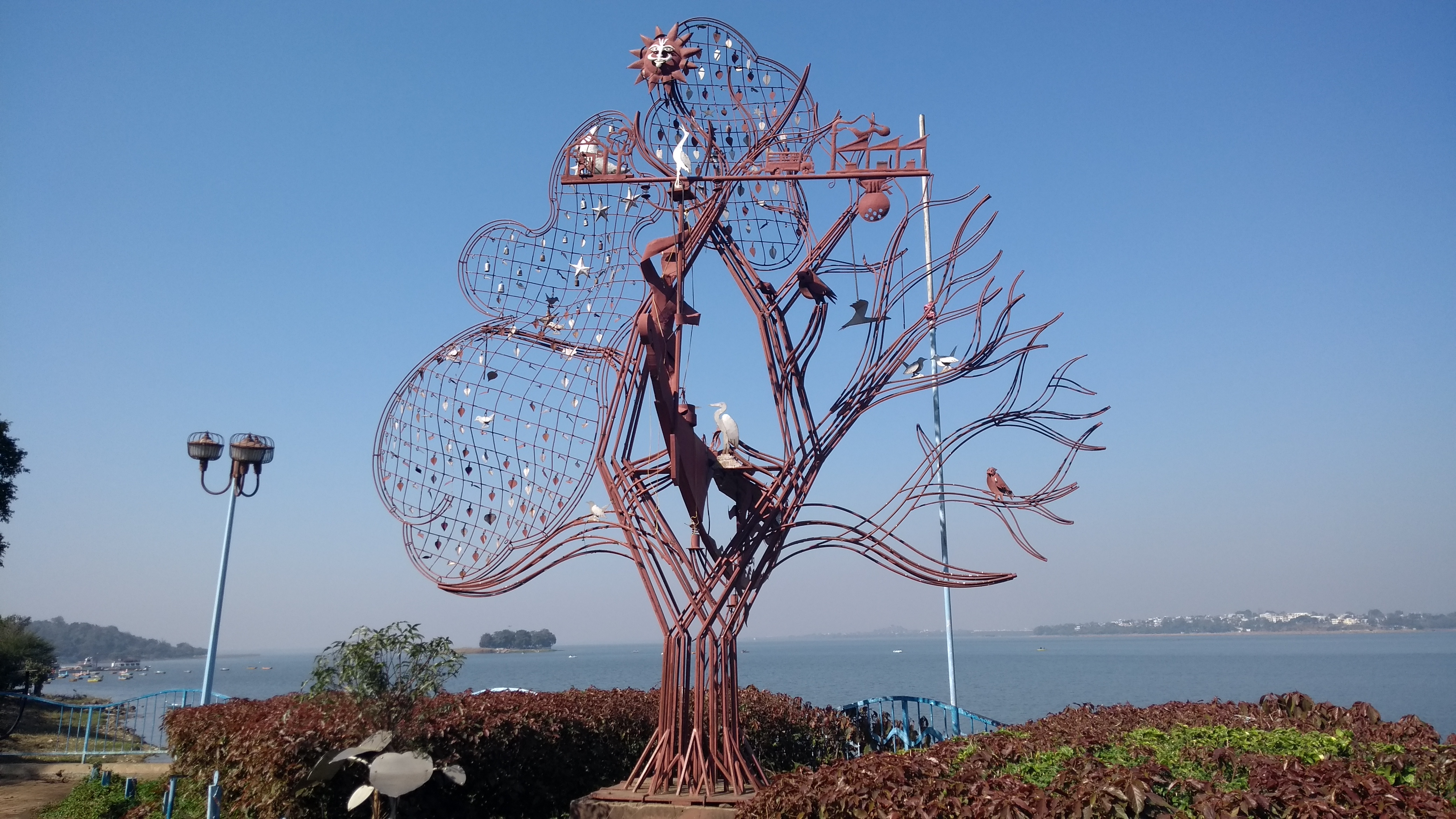
Noha Installation front view
