= Kolu Khedi, Berasia (census code 482280) =

Kolu Khedi
- Village
- Location within Madhya Pradesh Location within India
- Coordinates: 23.521340°N 77.416705°E
- Country: India
- State: Madhya Pradesh
- District: Bhopal
- Tehsil: Berasia

Population (2011)
  - Total: 480
- Time zone: UTC+5:30 (IST)
- ISO 3166 code: MP-IN
- Census code: 482280

Kolu Khedi is a village in the Bhopal district of Madhya Pradesh, India. It is located in the Berasia tehsil.

It is located off the Guna-Bhopal road, near Harrakheda.

== Demographics ==
According to the 2011 census of India, Kolu Khedi has 109 households. The effective literacy rate (i.e. the literacy rate of population excluding children aged 6 and below) is 76.72%.

Demographics (2011 Census)
| | Total | Male | Female |
|---|---|---|---|
| Population | 480 | 251 | 229 |
| Children aged below 6 years | 72 | 39 | 33 |
| Scheduled caste | 133 | 70 | 63 |
| Scheduled tribe | 12 | 5 | 7 |
| Literates | 313 | 185 | 128 |
| Workers (all) | 176 | 137 | 39 |
| Main workers (total) | 61 | 60 | 1 |
| Main workers: Cultivators | 44 | 43 | 1 |
| Main workers: Agricultural labourers | 4 | 4 | 0 |
| Main workers: Household industry workers | 2 | 2 | 0 |
| Main workers: Other | 11 | 11 | 0 |
| Marginal workers (total) | 115 | 77 | 38 |
| Marginal workers: Cultivators | 5 | 1 | 4 |
| Marginal workers: Agricultural labourers | 105 | 72 | 33 |
| Marginal workers: Household industry workers | 1 | 1 | 0 |
| Marginal workers: Others | 4 | 3 | 1 |
| Non-workers | 304 | 114 | 190 |
