= Jamni River =

- Map of the rivers and lakes in India

- Location of the river in India

Location
- Country: India
- State: Madhya Pradesh
- City and Towns: Tikamgarh, Mohangarh

Physical characteristics
- Source
  - location: Sagar District, Madhya Pradesh, India
  - coordinates: 25°13′N 78°35′E
- Mouth: Betwa River
  - location: Madhya Pradesh, India

Jamni River is a river in northern India. It is a main tributary of the Betwa River. Its originate in Sagar District in Vindhya Range and enters Lalitpur District near Madanpur village. It meets Betwa river near Orchha.

Alternative Names:	Jamni, Jamni Nadi, Jamni Nadī, Jamni River
Type:	Stream - a body of running water moving to a lower level in a channel on land
Mindat.org Region:	Niwari district, Madhya Pradesh, India
Region:	Madhya Pradesh, India
Latitude:	25° 22' 25" N
Longitude:	78° 39' 31" E
Lat/Long (dec):	25.37365,78.65885
Köppen climate type:	Csa : Hot-summer Mediterranean climate
