= Bhadbhada Dam =

Bhadbhada dam
- Interactive map of Bhadbhada dam
- Official name: Bhadbhada dam
- Location: Bhopal, Madhya Pradesh
- Coordinates: 23°12′30″N 77°22′44″E
- Opening date: 1965; 61 years ago

Reservoir
- Creates: Upper Lake (Bhopal)
- Total capacity: 117.05×10^{6} m^{3} (4.134×10^{9} cu ft)

The Bhadbhada dam is a set of 11 sluice gates at the south-east corner of Upper lake in Bhopal. It was constructed in 1965. The gates are used to control the outflow of water from the lake to Kaliasote river, and are usually opened only when the city receives heavy rainfall during the monsoon season. It has a full tank level of 1,666.80 feet (508.04 m).
