= Harrakheda =

- village
- Location within Madhya Pradesh Location within India
- Coordinates: 23.5154862°N 77.4063625°E
- Country: India
- State: Madhya Pradesh
- District: Bhopal
- Tehsil: Berasia
- Elevation: 476 m (1,562 ft)

Population (2011)
  - Total: 2,429
- Time zone: UTC+5:30 (IST)
- ISO 3166 code: MP-IN
- 2011 census code: 482282

Harrakheda is a village in the Bhopal district of Madhya Pradesh, India. It is located in the Berasia tehsil.

== Demographics ==
According to the 2011 census of India, Harrakheda has 452 households. The effective literacy rate (i.e. the literacy rate of population excluding children aged 6 and below) is 68.82%.

Demographics (2011 Census)
	Total	Male	Female
Population	2429	1294	1135
Children aged below 6 years	428	243	185
Scheduled caste	656	362	294
Scheduled tribe	0	0	0
Literates	1377	807	570
Workers (all)	999	666	333
Main workers (total)	590	392	198
Main workers: Cultivators	107	92	15
Main workers: Agricultural labourers	320	174	146
Main workers: Household industry workers	17	13	4
Main workers: Other	146	113	33
Marginal workers (total)	409	274	135
Marginal workers: Cultivators	8	6	2
Marginal workers: Agricultural labourers	318	208	110
Marginal workers: Household industry workers	21	11	10
Marginal workers: Others	62	49	13
Non-workers	1430	628	802
