= Talbehat =

- Town
- Location in Uttar Pradesh, India
- Coordinates: 25.042°N 78.433°E
- Country: India
- State: Uttar Pradesh
- District: Lalitpur

Population (2011)
  - Total: 14,176

Languages
  - Official: Hindi
- Time zone: UTC+5:30 (IST)
- Sex ratio: .902 ♂/♀

Talbehat is a nagar panchayat city in Lalitpur district in the Indian state of Uttar Pradesh.

The Talbehat Fort is situated on the Jhansi-Lalitpur four lane road. Raja Thakur Mardan Singh Bundela ruled from this fort and in 1857 he fought there against the British alongside Rani Laxmi Bai. The Fort contains three temples, dedicated to Angad, Hanuman and Narsimha. The Fort has massive structures and is situated on the bank of the large Mansarovar Lake. This lake is suitable for various water sports activities. The Hazaria Mahadev Temple is situated on the banks of the lake. Talbehat is also a tehsil headquarters. The tehsil in the Talbehat area is divided into six revenue inspector circles. Talbehat is also famous for its production of Iron Kadhai, Tawa, cook wares and Axe(Kulhari). It has a Mini Industrial Area to facilitate the production. There are many Iron factories operating here.

== Demographics ==
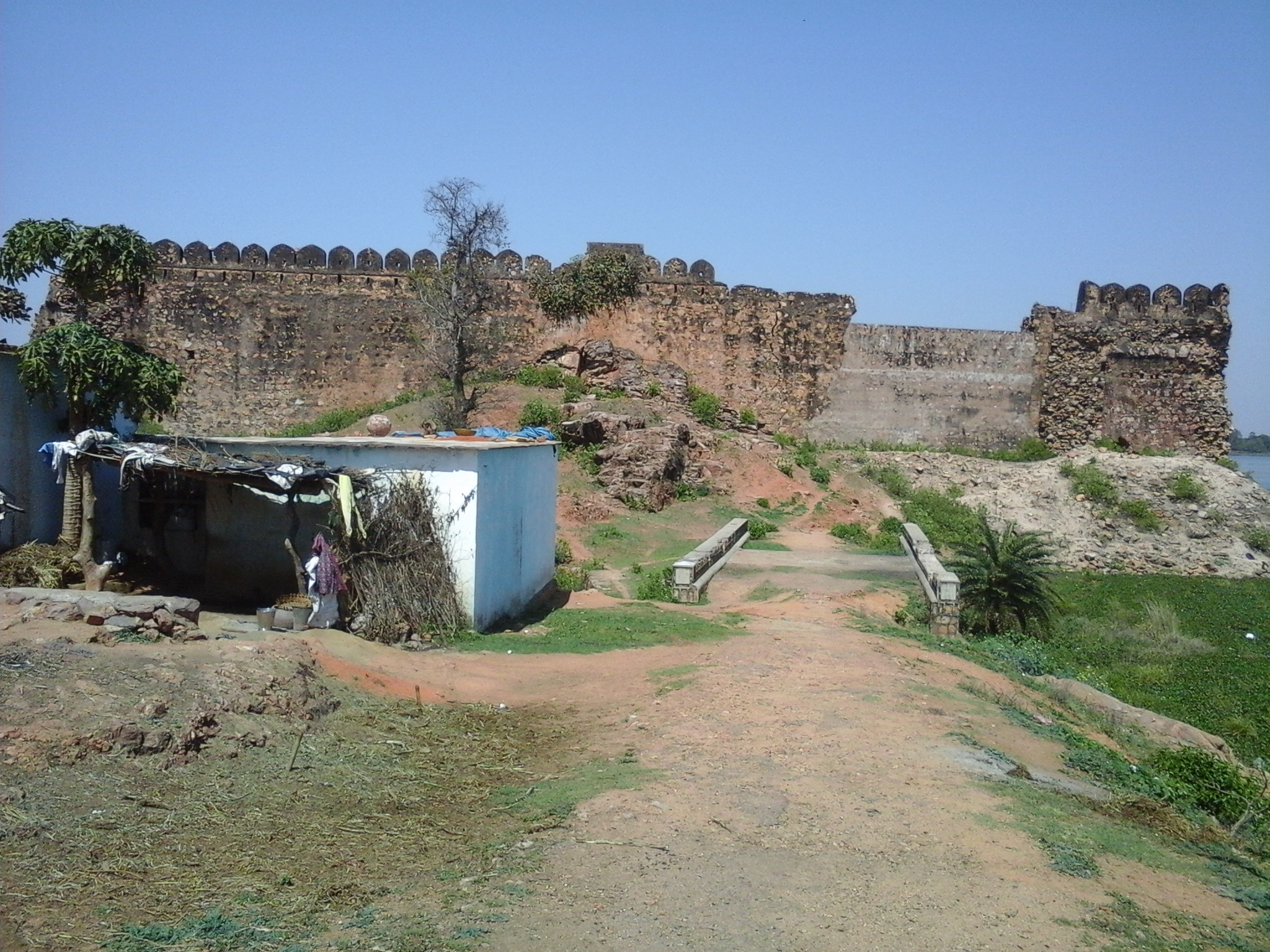
Fort (side view)

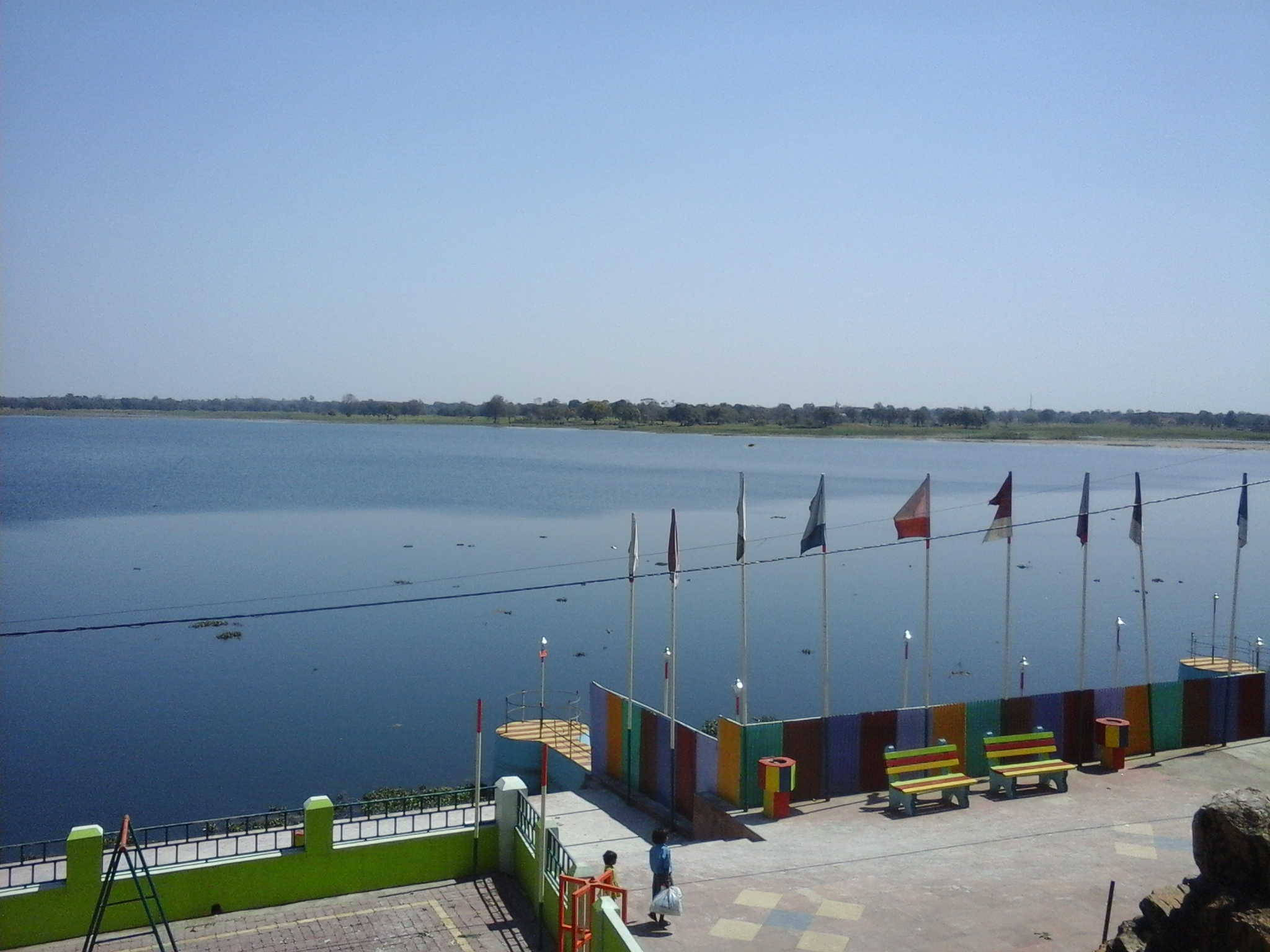
Boat club

As of 2011 India census, Talbehat has a population of 14,176 divided into 12 wards. Male population is 7,452 and that of female is 6,724. Talbehat has an average literacy rate of 79.40%, higher than state average of 67.68%, male literacy is 85.20%, and female literacy is 72.96%. In Talbehat, 12.81% of the population is under 6 years of age. Out of the total population, 4,492 are engaged in work or business activity with 3,678 are males and rest 814 are females.

Schedule Caste (SC) and Schedule Tribe (ST) constitutes 19.06% and 0.23% of the total population in Talbehat. Based on the census 88.22% of the total population are Hindus, 7.26% are Muslims, 4.32% are Jains and the rest is occupied by Christian, Sikh and Buddhist.

== Transportation ==
The town is located next to the major highway 26 and the main line of the Delhi & Bombay train route. Talbehat has very few trains stopping at the railway station established in 1980s. The preferable way to reach it is by a train from Jhansi or Lalitpur.

== Places to visit ==
Destinations nearby include the Matatila Dam and famous religious temples like Pawagir Ji Jain Temple and Deva Mata Temple. Other tourist places include the Talbehat Fort, the Boat Club, and Mansarovar Lake .

Talbehat is surrounded by stony ridges descending towards the Betwa River Valley. The area receives moderate rainfall.

Temples are in Talbehat, Hajaria Mahadev, Madan Mohan Sarkar, Hanuman Gari, Gauri Bhawani, Mehravan mata, Radha Raman Ji & Vishwakarma Mandir, Tekri Sarkar, Anjani Mata Mandir, Baria Wali Mata Mandir and Dhuruv Kuti Maharaj and Digambar Jain Temples.
