= Parichha Dam =

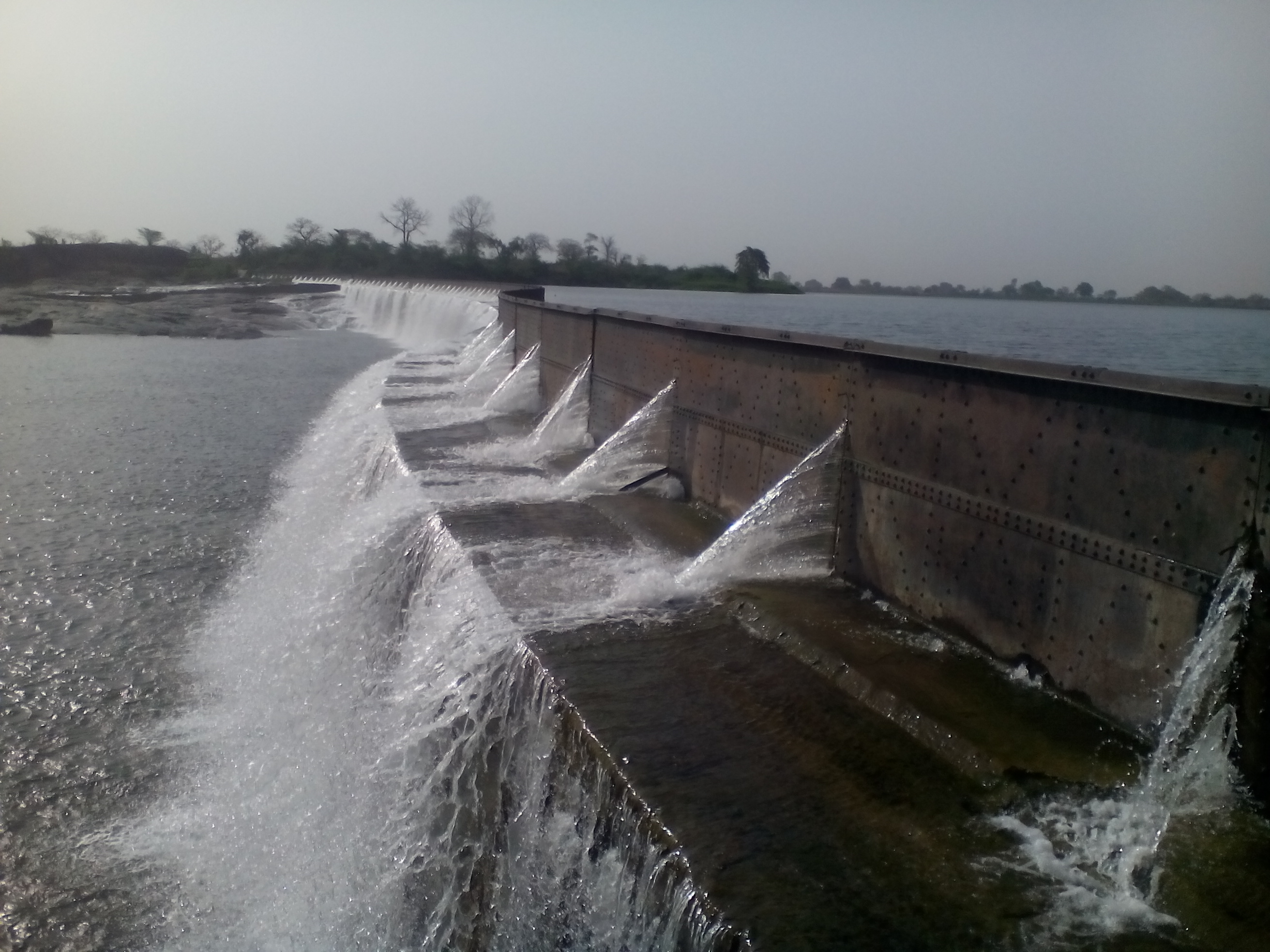
- Parichha
- Country: India
- Location: Uttar Pradesh

Dam and spillways
- Impounds: Betwa River
- Length: 1,174.69 m (3,854.0 ft)

Parichha Dam, built on the Betwa River near Parichha town, which is about 25 km from Jhansi on the Jhansi-Kanpur National Highway No. 25. Its reservoir is used by the Parichha Thermal Power Station for electricity generation. The reservoir's impounded water that runs to Notghat Bridge, 34 km away from Jhansi - is popular for water sports.

Jhansi is regarded as the "gateway of Bundelkhand area of Uttar Pradesh". The dam, due to its scenery and facility for water sports, has become a tourist spot. The best time to come here is from November to March.

== Construction ==
Parichha Dam was constructed during the British reign between 1881 and 1886. The dam is 1,174.69 meters long and 16.77 meters high.

The dam was built mainly for irrigation purpose and for producing hydro electricity. The dam is the major source of drinking water and irrigation in the area of Bundelkhand, as this part of Uttar Pradesh faces severe water crisis.

== Economy ==
Parichha Thermal Power Station is a coal plant, fully operational and featuring six units. Its total capacity is 1,140 MWe. It operates under Uttar Pradesh Rajya Vidyut Utpadan Nigam Ltd.

== Location ==
Jhansi is connected to main cities of India through rail, road, and air. The nearest airport is in Gwalior.

Jhansi is an important railhead on the Delhi-Chennai route. Most major cities in the country like Mumbai, Delhi, Chennai, Agra, Bhopal, Gwalior, etc. are connected to Jhansi by rail.

== Nearest Famous Tourist Place ==
- Orchha Temple, Orchha, which is around 30 kilometers away. Orchha is a beautiful historical town located in the Tikamgarh district of Madhya Pradesh, known for its stunning temples, forts, and palaces, including the Orchha Fort and the Betwa River. The Ram Raja Temple in Orchha, Madhya Pradesh, is a unique temple where Lord Ram is worshipped as a king, and it is the only temple where Ram is depicted sitting on a throne.
- Lakshmi Narayan Temple, Orchha.
- Chaturbhuj Temple, Orchha.

== See also ==
- Parichha Thermal Power Station
