= Kolu Khedi Khurd =

- village
- Location within Madhya Pradesh Location within India
- Coordinates: 23.858799°N 77.336224°E
- Country: India
- State: Madhya Pradesh
- District: Bhopal
- Tehsil: Berasia

Population (2011)
  - Total: 938
- Time zone: UTC+5:30 (IST)
- ISO 3166 code: MP-IN
- Census code: 482326

Khedi Khurd is a village in the Khargone district of Madhya Pradesh, India. It is located in the Gogawaa tehsil.

== Demographics ==
According to the 2011 census of India, Kolu Khedi Khurd has 192 households. The effective literacy rate (i.e. the literacy rate of population excluding children aged 6 and below) is 51.34%.

Demographics (2011 Census)
	Total	Male	Female
Population	938	501	437
Children aged below 6 years	192	101	91
Scheduled caste	187	100	87
Scheduled tribe	1	1	0
Literates	383	229	154
Workers (all)	466	252	214
Main workers (total)	220	153	67
Main workers: Cultivators	214	148	66
Main workers: Agricultural labourers	1	1	0
Main workers: Household industry workers	3	3	0
Main workers: Other	2	1	1
Marginal workers (total)	246	99	147
Marginal workers: Cultivators	78	14	64
Marginal workers: Agricultural labourers	166	85	81
Marginal workers: Household industry workers	1	0	1
Marginal workers: Others	1	0	1
Non-workers	472	249	223
