= Kolu Khedi Kalan =

- village
- Location within Madhya Pradesh Location within India
- Coordinates: 23.672596°N 77.261803°E
- Country: India
- State: Madhya Pradesh
- District: Bhopal
- Tehsil: Berasia

Population (2011)
  - Total: 2,222
- Time zone: UTC+5:30 (IST)
- ISO 3166 code: MP-IN
- Census code: 482102

Kolu Khedi Kalan is a village in the Bhopal district of Madhya Pradesh, India. It is located in the Berasia tehsil.

== Demographics ==
According to the 2011 census of India, Kolu Khedi Kalan has 460 households. The effective literacy rate (i.e. the literacy rate of population excluding children aged 6 and below) is 56.89%.

Demographics (2011 Census)
| | Total | Male | Female |
|---|---|---|---|
| Population | 2222 | 1169 | 1053 |
| Children aged below 6 years | 380 | 179 | 201 |
| Scheduled caste | 723 | 356 | 367 |
| Scheduled tribe | 25 | 15 | 10 |
| Literates | 1048 | 637 | 411 |
| Workers (all) | 1183 | 634 | 549 |
| Main workers (total) | 1041 | 571 | 470 |
| Main workers: Cultivators | 383 | 232 | 151 |
| Main workers: Agricultural labourers | 645 | 334 | 311 |
| Main workers: Household industry workers | 2 | 0 | 2 |
| Main workers: Other | 11 | 5 | 6 |
| Marginal workers (total) | 142 | 63 | 79 |
| Marginal workers: Cultivators | 85 | 36 | 49 |
| Marginal workers: Agricultural labourers | 56 | 26 | 30 |
| Marginal workers: Household industry workers | 0 | 0 | 0 |
| Marginal workers: Others | 1 | 1 | 0 |
| Non-workers | 1039 | 535 | 504 |
