= Halali Reservoir =

Halali
- Location within India
- Country: India
- Location: Bhopal district, Raisen district, Vidisha district
- Coordinates: 23.49°N 77.51°E
- Opening date: 1973

Dam and spillways
- Dam volume: 227 million m^{3}

Reservoir
- Surface area: 2528 ha (full res. level); 2590 (dead res. level)
- Normal elevation: 458 m above MSL

The Halali reservoir is a reservoir in Madhya Pradesh state of India, spanning Bhopal, Raisen, and Vidisha districts. It is built on the Halali River, and lies 40 km northwards from the state capital Bhopal.

The major fish species found in the reservoir include catla, rohu, mrigal, wallago attu, mystus and chitala.

== Halali River ==
The Halali River is a tributary of the Betwa River. It was formerly known as Thal River. In the 18th century, Dost Mohammad Khan's forces killed a rival Rajput force near Jagdishpur (later renamed to Islamnagar) on the bank of the river. The river was renamed to "Halali river" (the river of slaughter), because it appeared red with the blood of the victims. Another name for the river is Banganga.

The Halali reservoir was commissioned in 1973.
