= Betwa River =

River in northern India

Betwa River Vetravatī
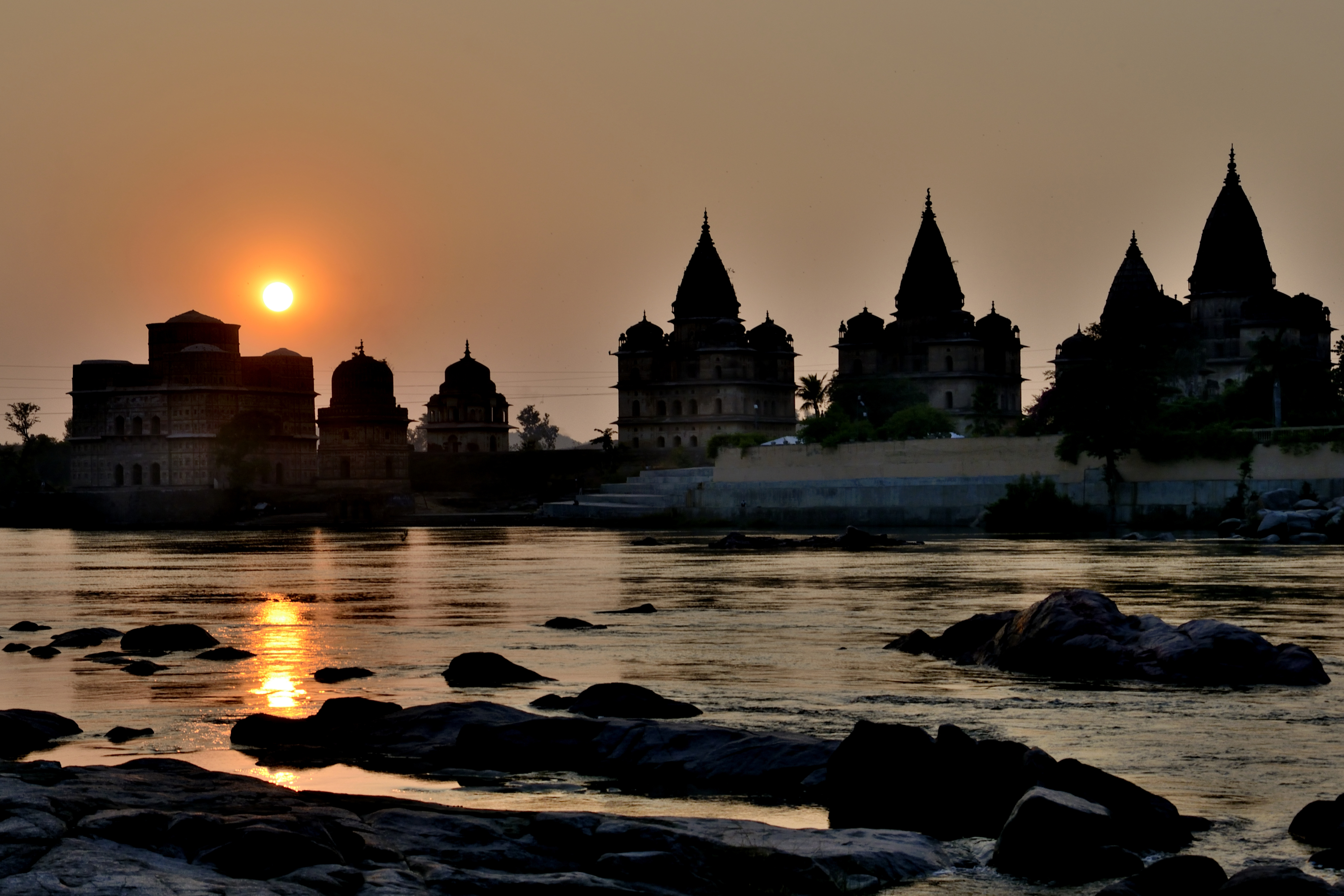
- Betwa River near Orchha
- Interactive Map

Location
- Country: India
- State: Madhya Pradesh, Uttar Pradesh
- Cities: Vidisha, Sanchi, Ganj Basoda, Kurwai, Orchha, Hamirpur

Physical characteristics
- Source: Vindhya Range
  - location: Near Obedullaganj, Vindhya Range north of Hoshangabad
- Mouth: Yamuna
  - location: Hamirpur, Uttar Pradesh, India
  - coordinates: 25°55′03″N 80°12′45″E
- Discharge
  - location: Rajghat Dam
  - average: 658 m^{3}/s (23,200 cu ft/s)
  - maximum: 3,178 m^{3}/s (112,200 cu ft/s)

Basin features
- Tributaries
  - left: Halali, Kaliyasoth, Urwashi
  - right: Bina, Dhasaan, Jamni

The Betwa (Sanskrit: वेत्रवती) is a river in central and northern India, and a tributary of the Yamuna. It rises in the Vindhya Range (Raisen) just north of Hoshangabad (Narmadapuram) in Madhya Pradesh and flows northeast through Madhya Pradesh before entering Uttar Pradesh after flowing through Orchha. Nearly half of its course, which is not navigable, runs over the Malwa Plateau. The confluence of the Yamuna and the Betwa rivers is in Hamirpur district in Uttar Pradesh, where Yamuna flows northward and Betwa approaches from south of Hamirpur.

The Indian Navy named one of its frigates INS Betwa in honour of the river.

== History ==
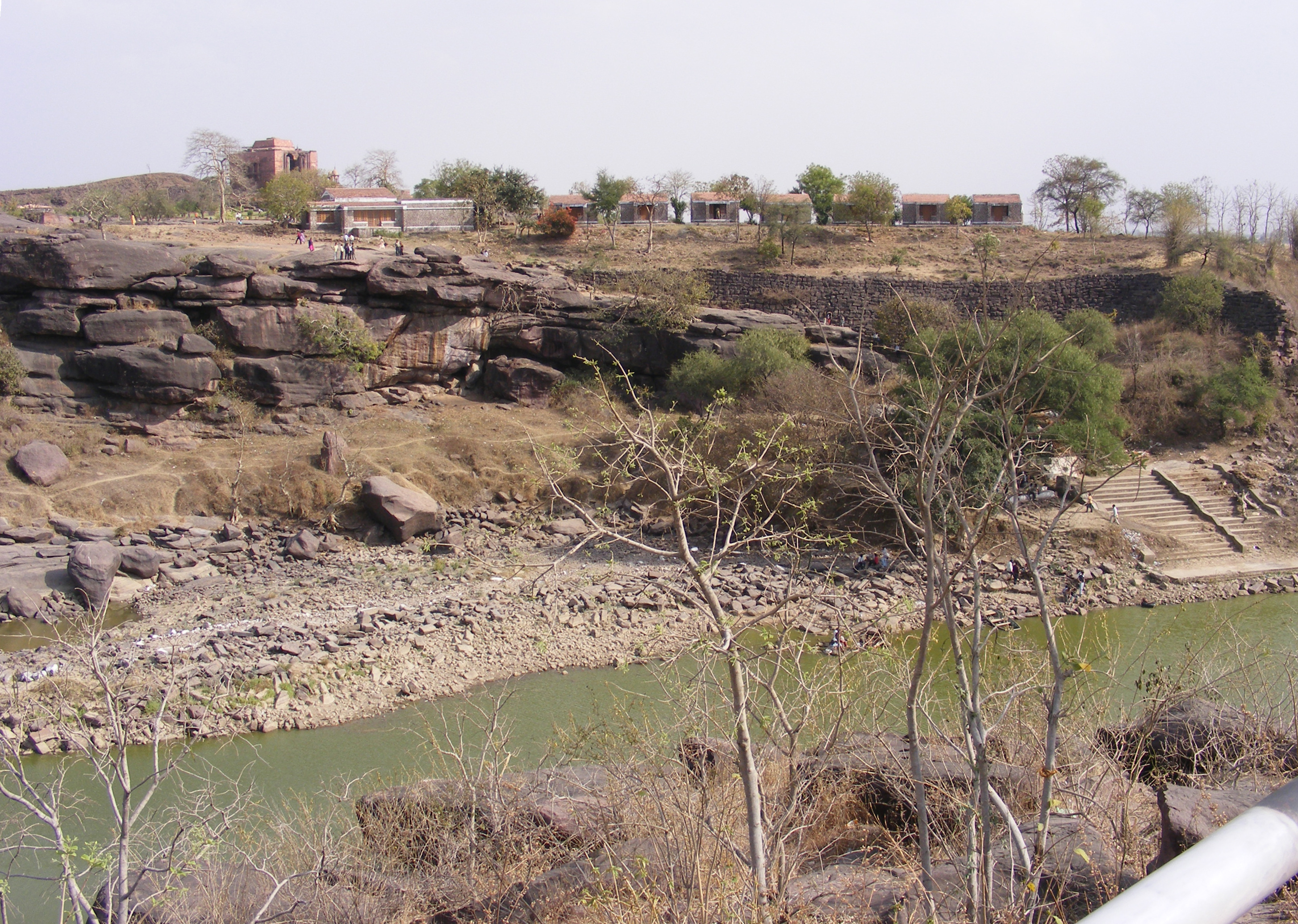
River Betwa is close to the 11th-century Bhojeshwar Temple at Bhojpur, Madhya Pradesh.

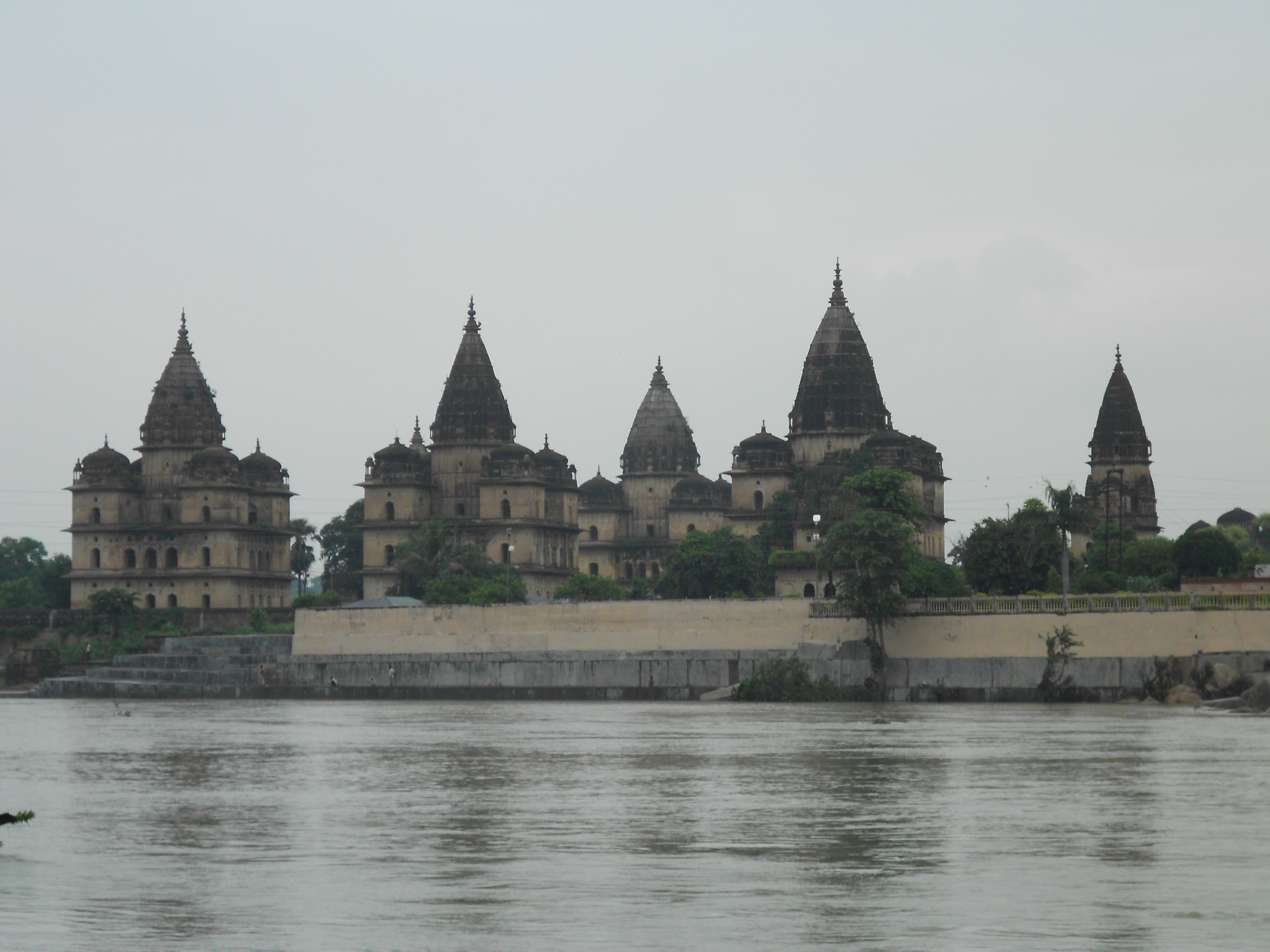
Chhatris on the bank of Betwa river

In Sanskrit, "Betwa" is Vetravati. This river is mentioned in the epic Mahabharata along with the Charmanwati river.

Both are tributaries of the Yamuna River. Vetravati was also known as Shuktimati. The capital of the Chedi Kingdom was on the banks of this river. The length of the river from its origin to its confluence with Yamuna is 590 kilometres (370 mi), out of which 232 kilometres (144 mi) lies in Madhya Pradesh and the balance of 358 kilometres (222 mi) in Uttar Pradesh.

By an interstate agreement between the states of Uttar Pradesh and Madhya Pradesh in 1973, the Betwa River Board (BRB) was constituted under the Betwa River Board Act, 1976. The Union Minister of the Ministry of Water Resources, the Chairman of the Board, the Union Minister of Power, the Union Minister of State for Water Resources, and the chief ministers and ministers in charge of finance, irrigation, and power in Uttar Pradesh and Madhya Pradesh are its members.

== Ken-Betwa project ==
The Ken-Betwa River Linking Project is a large-scale interlinking initiative aimed at transferring surplus water from the Ken River in Madhya Pradesh to the Betwa River in Uttar Pradesh. The project involves the construction of the Daudhan Dam, a 2.5 km canal, and other infrastructure. The government asserts that the project will help irrigate 1,060,000 hectares [2,600,000 acres] in drought-stricken Bundelkhand, provide drinking water to 6.2 million people, and generate 130 MW of hydropower and solar energy once completed in 2030. The estimated cost of the project is ₹440 billion ($5.06 billion).

=== Environmental Concerns ===
The project has been the subject of environmental criticism, particularly regarding its impact on the Panna Tiger Reserve. Environmentalists warn that the project will submerge nearly 98 sq km of the 543 sq km sanctuary, threatening tiger conservation efforts that successfully reintroduced the species after local extinction in 2009. Concerns have also been raised about the impact on vultures, whose nesting sites may be disturbed by the dam’s construction.

A 2019 expert panel appointed by the Supreme Court of India questioned the project’s economic feasibility and environmental impact, recommending alternative irrigation methods. A 2023 study suggested that river-linking projects could worsen water stress rather than alleviate it. Critics also argue that the government has based its water availability estimates on outdated 2003 data without independent verification.

Government officials defend the project, stating that it has received all necessary environmental clearances and that additional land has been allocated to offset the loss of tiger habitats.

=== Displacement and Protests ===
The project will submerge 10 villages and displace 11 more, affecting over 7,000 families, primarily from Gond and Kol indigenous communities. Residents have staged protests, fearing loss of homes and livelihoods. However, authorities claim that about 90% of affected residents have accepted compensation offers, and efforts are ongoing to identify alternative land for resettlement.

== Dams ==
- Rajghat Dam
- Matatila Dam
- Parichha Dam
- Dhurwara Dam
- Halali Dam
- Sukma Dukma Dam

== See also ==
- Ganga
- Yamuna
