= Amarpatan Assembly constituency =

Constituency of the Madhya Pradesh legislative assembly in India

Coordinates: 24.32°N 80.97°E

Amarpatan
- Constituency No. 66 for the Madhya Pradesh Legislative Assembly

Constituency details
- Country: India
- Region: Central India
- State: Madhya Pradesh
- District: Satna
- Lok Sabha constituency: Satna
- Established: 1951
- Reservation: None

Member of Legislative Assembly
- 16th Madhya Pradesh Legislative Assembly
- Incumbent Rajendra Kumar Singh
- Party: Indian National Congress
- Elected year: 2023
- Preceded by: Ramkhelawan Patel

Amarpatan Assembly constituency is one of the 230 Vidhan Sabha (Legislative Assembly) constituencies of Madhya Pradesh state in central India. This constituency came into existence in 1951, as one of the 48 Vidhan Sabha constituencies of the erstwhile Vindhya Pradesh state.

== Overview ==
Amarpatan (constituency number 66) is one of the 7 Vidhan Sabha constituencies located in Satna district. This constituency covers the entire Ramnagar tehsil, Amarpatan nagar panchayat and part of Amarpatan tehsil of the district.

Amarpatan is part of Satna Lok Sabha constituency along with six other Vidhan Sabha segments of this district, namely, Chitrakoot, Raigaon, Satna, Nagod, Maihar and Rampur-Baghelan.

== Members of Legislative Assembly ==
=== Vindhya Pradesh Legislative Assembly ===
Election	Member	Party
1951	Lal Bihari Singh	Indian National Congress

=== Madhya Pradesh Legislative Assembly ===
Election	Member	Party
1957	Ramhit Gupta	Bharatiya Jana Sangh
1962	Gulsher Ahmad	Indian National Congress
1967	Ramhit Gupta	Bharatiya Jana Sangh
1972	Gulsher Ahmad	Indian National Congress
1977	Ramhit Gupta	Janata Party
1980	Rajendra Kumar Singh	Indian National Congress (Indira)
1985	Ramhit Gupta	Bharatiya Janata Party
1990	Ramhit Gupta	Bharatiya Janata Party
1993	Rajendra Kumar Singh	Indian National Congress
1998	Shivmohan Singh	Indian National Congress
2003	Rajendra Kumar Singh	Indian National Congress
2008	Ramkhelawan Patel	Bharatiya Janata Party
2013	Rajendra Kumar Singh	Indian National Congress
2018	Ramkhelawan Patel	Bharatiya Janata Party
2023	Rajendra Kumar Singh	Indian National Congress

== Election results ==
=== 2023 ===
2023 Madhya Pradesh Legislative Assembly election: Amarpatan
Party	Candidate	Votes	%	±%
INC	Rajendra Kumar Singh	80,949	43.72	+10.18
BJP	Ramkhelawan Patel	74,459	40.22	+4.44
BSP	Chhangelal Kol	21,317	11.51	−11.16
NOTA	None of the above	1,379	0.74	−0.68
Majority		6,490	3.5	+1.26
Turnout		185,141	75.61	−0.4
INC gain from BJP		Swing		

=== 2018 ===
2018 Madhya Pradesh Legislative Assembly election: Amarpatan
Party	Candidate	Votes	%	±%
BJP	Ramkhelawan Patel	59,836	35.78	
INC	Rajendra Kumar Singh	56,089	33.54	
BSP	Chhangelal Kol	37,918	22.67	
Independent	Om Prakash Gautam	1,908	1.14	
Independent	Rajiv Lochan Tiwari	1,625	0.97	
NOTA	None of the above	2,380	1.42	
Majority		3,747	2.24	
Turnout		167,254	76.01	
BJP gain from INC		Swing		

=== 2013 ===
2013 Madhya Pradesh Legislative Assembly election: Amarpatan
Party	Candidate	Votes	%	±%
INC	Rajendra Kumar Singh	48,341	32.53	
BJP	Ramkhelawan Patel	36602	24.63	
BSP	Chhangelal Kol	35020	23.57	N/A
GGP	Dharmendra Singh Tiwari	18113	12.19	
NOTA	None of the Above	2968	2.00	
Majority				
Turnout		148589	72.09	
Swing to INC from BJP		Swing		
