= Nagod Assembly constituency =

Constituency of the Madhya Pradesh legislative assembly in India

Coordinates: 24.57°N 80.58°E

Nagod
- Constituency No. 64 for the Madhya Pradesh Legislative Assembly

Constituency details
- Country: India
- Region: Central India
- State: Madhya Pradesh
- District: Satna
- Lok Sabha constituency: Satna
- Established: 1951
- Reservation: None

Member of Legislative Assembly
- 16th Madhya Pradesh Legislative Assembly
- Incumbent Nagendra Singh
- Party: Bharatiya Janata Party
- Elected year: 2023
- Preceded by: Yadvendra Singh

Nagod Assembly constituency is one of the 230 Vidhan Sabha (Legislative Assembly) constituencies of Madhya Pradesh state in central India. This constituency came into existence in 1951, as one of the 48 Vidhan Sabha constituencies of the erstwhile Vindhya Pradesh state, but it was abolished in 1956. It again came into existence in 1966, following the delimitation of the legislative assembly constituencies.

== Overview ==
Nagod (constituency number 64) is one of the seven Vidhan Sabha constituencies located in Satna district. This constituency covers the entire Unchehara tehsil, Nagod nagar panchayat and part of Nagod tehsil of the district.

Nagod is part of Satna Lok Sabha constituency along with six other Vidhan Sabha segments of this district, namely, Chitrakoot, Raigaon, Satna, Amarpatan, Maihar and Rampur-Baghelan.

== Members of Legislative Assembly ==
=== Vindhya Pradesh Legislative Assembly ===
| Election | Member | Party |
|---|---|---|
| 1951 | Gopal Saran Singh | Indian National Congress |

=== Madhya Pradesh Legislative Assembly ===
| Election | Member | Party |
|---|---|---|
| 1967 | V. Prasad | Indian National Congress |
| 1972 | Bala Prasad | Indian National Congress |
| 1977 | Nagendra Singh | Janata Party |
| 1980 | Nagendra Singh | Bharatiya Janata Party |
| 1985 | Ram Pratap Singh | Bharatiya Janata Party |
| 1990 | Ram Pratap Singh | Bharatiya Janata Party |
| 1993 | Ram Dev Singh | Bharatiya Janata Party |
| 1998 | Ram Pratap Singh | Bharatiya Janata Party |
| 2003 | Nagendra Singh | Bharatiya Janata Party |
| 2008 | Nagendra Singh | Bharatiya Janata Party |
| 2013 | Yadvendra Singh | Bharatiya Janata Party |
| 2018 | Nagendra Singh | Bharatiya Janata Party |
| 2023 | Nagendra Singh | Bharatiya Janata Party |

== Election results ==
=== 2023 ===
2023 Madhya Pradesh Legislative Assembly election: Nagod
| Party | Candidate | Votes | % | ±% |
|---|---|---|---|---|
| BJP | Nagendra Singh | 70,712 | 38.59 | +6.07 |
| BSP | Yadvendra Singh | 53,343 | 29.11 | +15.76 |
| INC | Rashmi Patel | 50,282 | 27.44 | −4.35 |
| Vindhya Janta Party | Suraj Singh Koni | 2,003 | 1.09 | |
| NOTA | None of the above | 1,608 | 0.88 | −0.49 |
| Majority | | 17,369 | 9.48 | +8.75 |
| Turnout | | 183,248 | 76.43 | −1.69 |
| BJP hold | | Swing | | |

=== 2018 ===
2018 Madhya Pradesh Legislative Assembly election: Nagod
| Party | Candidate | Votes | % | ±% |
|---|---|---|---|---|
| BJP | Nagendra Singh | 54,637 | 32.52 | |
| INC | Yadvendra Singh | 53,403 | 31.79 | |
| Independent | Rashmi Singh Arunendra Singh | 25,700 | 15.3 | |
| BSP | Rambihari | 22,428 | 13.35 | |
| GGP | Ramsajeevan Kol | 1,934 | 1.15 | |
| NOTA | None of the above | 2,301 | 1.37 | |
| Majority | | 1,234 | 0.73 | |
| Turnout | | 167,994 | 78.12 | |
| BJP hold | | Swing | | |

== See also ==
- Nagod
