= Sukhlal Kushwaha =

Indian politician from Madhya Pradesh

Member of Indian Parliament (Lok Sabha)
- In office 1996–1998
- Constituency: Satna Lok Sabha constituency

Personal details
- Party: Bahujan Samaj Party
- Other political affiliations: Samajwadi Party
- Spouse: Prema Kushwaha
- Children: Siddharth Sukhlal Kushwaha
- Parent: Sivshewak Kushwaha (father)
- Education: Awadhesh Pratap Singh University

Sukhlal Kushwaha (1964 – 2015) was an Indian politician from Madhya Pradesh, who served as Member of Indian Parliament (Lok Sabha) from Satna Lok Sabha constituency. He was a member of Bahujan Samaj Party and in his first ever Lok Sabha elections in 1996, he defeated veteran leader and former Chief Minister of Madhya Pradesh, Arjun Singh. In later part of his political career, he joined Samajwadi Party. His son Siddarth Sukhlal Kushwaha was elected as Member of Madhya Pradesh Legislative Assembly from Satna Assembly constituency, which comes under his Lok Sabha constituency.

== Life and career ==
Kushwaha was born on 5 January 1964 in a neighborhood called Bajbahi located in Satna district of Indian state of Madhya Pradesh to Shivshewak Kushwaha. He was sent to Government College, (Avdhesh Pratap Singh University) in Rewa, Madhya Pradesh, from where he completed his bachelor's degree in arts. On 11 March 1982, he was married to Prema Kushwaha; they had two sons, one of them, Siddharth Sukhlal Kushwaha represented Satna Assembly constituency as Member of Madhya Pradesh Legislative Assembly. He was also a social worker, and he participated in various movements for eradication of inequality and for serving the downtrodden section of society. He was elected to 11th Lok Sabha via 1996 Indian General Elections as a candidate of Bahujan Samaj Party from Satna Lok Sabha constituency. He also participated in Indian Parliamentary elections to Lok Sabha from Satna Lok Sabha constituency in 2009 elections. However, he acquired the second position in this election by securing 1,90,206 votes and was defeated by Ganesh Singh of Bharatiya Janata Party.

He allegedly committed suicide in 2015 by shooting himself.
