= Pratima Bagri =

Indian politician

Member of the 16th Madhya Pradesh Assembly
- Incumbent
- Assumed office December 2023
- Preceded by: Kalpana Verma
- Constituency: Raigaon

Personal details
- Born: 1988 (age 37–38) Nagod
- Party: Bharatiya Janata Party
- Education: Bachelor of Laws
- Alma mater: Awadhesh Pratap Singh University
- Occupation: Politician

Pratima Bagri (born 1988) is an Indian politician from Madhya Pradesh. She is a member of the Madhya Pradesh Legislative Assembly representing the Bharatiya Janata Party from Raigaon Assembly constituency, in Satna district. She won the 2023 Madhya Pradesh Legislative Assembly election.

== Early life and education ==
Bagri hails from an agricultural family in Nagaud village.She completed her master's degree in Social Work and later did LLB from Awdhesh Pratap Singh University, Rewa, Madhya Pradesh.

== Career ==
Bagri won the 2023 Madhya Pradesh Legislative Assembly election from Raigaon Assembly constituency representing Bharatiya Janata Party. She defeated her nearest rival Kalpana Varma of Indian National Congress by a margin of 36,060 votes. She found a berth in the Mohan Yadav ministry.

Pratima Bagri unsuccessfully contested in 2021 Raigaon by elections.
