= Dubahiyan =

- village
- Interactive map of Dubahiyan
- Country: India
- State: Madhya Pradesh
- District: Satna

Government
  - Sarpanch: Parvati Lodhi

Languages
  - Official: Hindi
- Time zone: UTC+5:30 (IST)
- PIN: 485446
- Telephone code: 07673
- Vehicle registration: MP-19

Dubahiyan is a village in Nagod Tahsil, Satna district in the Indian state of Madhya Pradesh. Dubahiyan is about 28 kilometres southwest of the district headquarters, Satna and 8 kilometres southwest of Nagod.

== Etymology ==
The meaning of Dubahiyan is two open arms, meaning a "we welcome you" gesture. It has three tola ("subunit") – Thakuraha, Majha and Delhi Tola.

== History ==
This village was developed after partition by son of Lal Saheb Hriday Shah, Thakur Saheb of Chandkuan S/O Raja Prithvi Raj Singh who ruled the princely state of Nagod between 1648 and 1685. His elder brother Raja Fakir Shah ruled Nagod between 1685 and 1721.

== Politics ==
Even today, the village and its surrounding area have its own traditions of being led by head of the Thakur family which draws on a tradition of over 200 years. Currently, Thakur Saheb, Sh. Jeevendra Pratap Singh is the eldest living descendant of the princely state ruler in the village.

== Culture ==
People in Dubahiyan speak Bagheli, which is another derivative of Hindi. Agriculture is a primary activity in Dubahiyan. Major crops include soybean, wheat, and Lentil.

== Transport ==
Dubahiyan is well connected through state highway 75 and district roads. Nearest railway station is Satna. Khajuraho airport is 102 km from Dubahiyan.

== Education ==
Dubahiyan has only primary schools in the village. For higher education, students move to the nearest town. Nearest university is Awdhesh Pratap Singh University, Rewa.

== Temples ==
Bajrangbali Temple established by Pathak Family and Devi Ji temple established by Thakur Family (in village) are important temples in this area. Nearby world famous temples such as Chaumukhnath, Kordannath, Khajuraho, Ramvan, Chitrakoot and Maa Sharda in Maihar can also be easily visited from Dubahiyan.
