= Neelanshu Chaturvedi =

Indian politician

Member of the Madhya Pradesh Legislative Assembly
- Incumbent
- Assumed office 2017
- Constituency: Chitrakoot

Personal details
- Born: 17 March 1982 (age 44) Chitrakoot, Satna district
- Citizenship: Indian
- Party: Indian National Congress
- Spouse: Dr. Archana Sharma Chaturvedi
- Children: 1 Son
- Parent: Hemraj Chaturvedi (father)
- Education: B. Tech.
- Profession: Politician
- Website: www.neelanshuinc.in
- As of 13 June, 2018 Source: ["Biography:Chaturvedi, Neelanshu" (PDF). Madhya Pradesh Legislative Assembly.]

Neelanshu Chaturvedi (born 5 July 1982) is an Indian politician from Madhya Pradesh. He won as an MLA from Chitrakoot Constituency in Satna District, Madhya Pradesh representing the Indian National Congress.

== Early life and education ==
Chaturvedi is from Chitrakoot, Satna District, Madhya Pradesh. He is the son of Hemraj Singh Chaturvedi. He completed his bachelors in technology (Agriculture Engineering) in 2005 at MGCGV college, Chitrakoot.

== Career ==
Chaturvedi entered the Vidhan Sabha winning the 2017 by-election in Chitrakoot Assembly constituency. The seat fell vacant after the death of 3 term MLA Prem Singh, also from the INC. Later, he won the 2018 Madhya Pradesh Legislative Assembly election defeating Surendra Singh Gaharwar of the Bharatiya Janata Party.
