= Jaitwar railway station =

Railway station in Madhya Pradesh, India

Jaitwar

General information
- Location: Jaitwar, Satna district, Madhya Pradesh; India
- Coordinates: 24°44′26″N 80°51′49″E
- System: Indian Railways station
- Owner: Indian Railways
- Operator: West Central Railway
- Line: Allahabad–Jabalpur section
- Platforms: 3
- Tracks: 3

Construction
- Structure type: Standard (on ground)
- Parking: Yes

Other information
- Status: Functioning
- Station code: JTW
- Zone(s): West Central Railway
- Division(s): Jabalpur
Location
- Location within India Location within Madhya Pradesh

Jaitwar or Jaitwara railway station is a railway station in Jaitwar town of Madhya Pradesh. Its code is JTW. It serves Jaitwar town. The station consists of three platforms. Passenger, Express and Superfast trains halt here.
