= Kotar, Satna =

Kotar
- Town
- Location in Madhya Pradesh, India Kotar (India)
- Coordinates: 24.72°N 80.98°E
- Country: India
- State: Madhya Pradesh
- District: Satna
- Elevation: 298 m (978 ft)

Population (2011)
  - Total: 7,520

Languages
  - Official: Hindi & Bagheli
- Time zone: UTC+5:30 (IST)
- ISO 3166 code: IN-MP
- Vehicle registration: MP19

Kotar is a town and a Nagar Parishad in Satna district in the Indian state of Madhya Pradesh.

== Geography ==
Kotar is located at 24.72°N 80.98°E. It has an average elevation of 298 metres (977 feet). A mini fort (Garhee) was constructed by Raja Bhava singh in 1675 at Kotar. He was a devotee of bhawan Jagannath of Puri. He brought statues from Puri and installed them at Kotar. Kotar is near by Birsinghpur.

== Demographics ==
As of the 2011 Census of India, Kotar had a population of 7,520 in which 3,803 are males while 3,717 are females.

Population of children with age of 0-6 is 985 which is 13.10% of total population of Kotar (NP). In Kotar Nagar Panchayat, female sex ratio is of 977 against a state average of 931. Moreover, the child sex ratio in Kotar is around 1,044 compared to the Madhya Pradesh state average of 918. The literacy rate is 73.86% higher than the state average of 69.32%. In Kotar, male literacy is around 83.65% while the female literacy rate is 63.75%.

Kotar Nagar Panchayat has total administration over 1,380 houses to which it supplies basic amenities like water and sewerage. It is also authorized to build roads within Kotar Nagar Panchayat limits and impose taxes on properties coming under its jurisdiction. In 1911 population of Kotar was 1814. There are four main Mohallas (Tola) in Kotar. These are Gadhitola, Maghtolaba, Kotarahan tola and Tiger mohalla (Bajar tola).
