= Satna Lok Sabha constituency =

Lok Sabha constituency in Madhya Pradesh, India

Coordinates: 24.58°N 80.83°E

Satna
- Lok Sabha constituency
- Interactive Map Outlining Satna Lok Sabha constituency

Constituency details
- Country: India
- Region: Central India
- State: Madhya Pradesh
- Assembly constituencies: Chitrakoot; Raigaon; Satna; Nagod; Maihar; Amarpatan; Rampur-Baghelan
- Established: 1952–57; 1967–
- Total electors: 17,05,260
- Reservation: None

Member of Parliament
- 18th Lok Sabha
- Incumbent Ganesh Singh
- Party: Bharatiya Janata Party
- Elected year: 2004

Satna Lok Sabha constituency is one of the 29 Lok Sabha constituencies in Madhya Pradesh state in central India. This constituency presently covers the entire Satna district of the state.

== Assembly segments ==
Presently, Satna Lok Sabha constituency comprises the following seven Vidhan Sabha (Legislative Assembly) segments:

#	Name	District	Member	Party	2024 Lead
61	Chitrakoot	Satna	Surendra Singh Gaharwar	BJP	BJP
62	Raigaon (SC)	Satna	Pratima Bagri	BJP	BJP
63	Satna	Satna	Siddharth Kushwaha	INC	BJP
64	Nagod	Satna	Narendra Singh	BJP	BJP
65	Maihar	Satna	Shrikant Chaturvedi	BJP	BJP
66	Amarpatan	Satna	Dr. Rajendra Singh	INC	BJP
67	Rampur-Baghelan	Satna	Vikram Singh	BJP	BJP

== Members of Parliament ==
Year	Winner	Party
1952	Shiv Dutt Upadhyaya	Indian National Congress
1967	Devendra Vijai Singh	Indian National Congress
1971	Narendra Singh	Bharatiya Jana Sangh
1977	Dada Sukhendra Singh	Janata Party
1980	Gulsher Ahmed	Indian National Congress (I)
1984	Aziz Qureshi	Indian National Congress
1989	Dada Sukhendra Singh	Bharatiya Janata Party
1991	Arjun Singh	Indian National Congress
1996	Sukhlal Kushwaha	Bahujan Samaj Party
1998	Ramanand Singh	Bharatiya Janata Party
1999	Ramanand Singh	Bharatiya Janata Party
2004	Ganesh Singh	Bharatiya Janata Party
2009	Ganesh Singh	Bharatiya Janata Party
2014	Ganesh Singh	Bharatiya Janata Party
2019	Ganesh Singh	Bharatiya Janata Party
2024	Ganesh Singh	Bharatiya Janata Party

== Election results ==
=== 2024 ===
2024 Indian general election: Satna
Party	Candidate	Votes	%	±%
BJP	Ganesh Singh	459,728	43.31	−9.56
INC	Dabbu Siddharth Sukhlal Kushwaha	3,74,779	35.39	+3.31
BSP	Narayan Tripathi	1,85,618	17.53	+7.66
NOTA	None of the above	2,553	0.24	Steady
Majority		84,949	7.92	−12.87
Turnout		10,56,175 (Note: does not include postal ballots)	61.94	▼8.92
BJP hold		Swing		

=== 2019 ===
2019 Indian general elections: Satna
Party	Candidate	Votes	%	±%
BJP	Ganesh Singh	588,753	52.87	+11.79
INC	Rajaram Tripathi	3,57,280	32.08	−8.05
BSP	Acche Lal Kushwaha	1,09,961	9.87	−3.77
PPI(D)	Nand Kishor Prajapati	6,964	0.63	New
IND.	Babu Lal	6,806	0.61	New
NOTA	None of the Above	2,644	0.24	−1.19
Majority		2,31,473	20.79	+19.84
Turnout		11,13,656	70.86	+8.21
BJP hold		Swing	+11.79	

=== 2014 ===
2014 Indian general elections: Satna
Party	Candidate	Votes	%	±%
BJP	Ganesh Singh	3,75,288	41.08	+11.57
INC	Ajay Singh	3,66,600	40.13	+26.36
BSP	Dharmendra Singh Tiwari	1,24,602	13.64	−15.20
IND.	Shriram Shukla	7,986	0.87	+0.87
AAP	Jagdish Singh	7,925	0.87	+0.87
NOTA	None of the Above	13,036	1.43	+1.43
Majority		8,688	0.95	+0.28
Turnout		9,13,451	62.63	+8.01
BJP hold		Swing	+11.57	

=== 2009 ===
2009 Indian general elections: Satna
Party	Candidate	Votes	%	±%
BJP	Ganesh Singh	1,94,624	29.51	−9.75
BSP	Sukhlal Kushwaha	1,90,206	28.84	+15.95
SP	Rajaram Tripathi	1,30,339	19.76	+11.43
INC	Sudhir Singh Tomar	90,806	13.77	−11.8
Independent	Bhaiya Lal Urmaliya	8,865	1.34	−6.37
Majority		4,418	0.67	−13.02
Turnout		6,59,605	54.62	+3.48
BJP hold		Swing		

=== 2004 ===
2004 Indian general elections: Satna
Party	Candidate	Votes	%	±%
BJP	Ganesh Singh	2,39,706	39.26	+4.29
INC	Rajendra Kumar Singh	1,56,116	25.57	–9.15
BSP	Kunwar Narendra Singh	78,687	12.89	–12.42
SP	Narayan Tripathi	50,841	8.33	+6.81
Independent	Jug Lal Kol	47,084	7.71	+7.71
Independent	Sunil	17,957	2.94	+2.94
Majority		83,590	13.69	+13.14
Turnout		6,10,602	51.14	–1.45
BJP hold		Swing		

== See also ==
- Satna district
- List of constituencies of the Lok Sabha
