= Yadvendra Singh =

Indian politician (born 1953)

Member of Madhya Pradesh Legislative Assembly
- Incumbent
- Assumed office 2023
- Preceded by: Rakesh Giri
- Constituency: Tikamgarh

Member of Madhya Pradesh Legislative Assembly
- In office 2013–2018
- Preceded by: Nagendra Singh
- Succeeded by: Nagendra Singh
- Constituency: Nagod

Personal details
- Born: 5 June 1953 (age 73) Kachnar, Nagod, India
- Citizenship: India
- Party: Indian National Congress
- Spouse: Prabha Singh
- Education: B.Tech.
- Profession: Politician

Yadvendra Singh is an Indian politician and a member of the Indian National Congress party.

== Political career ==
He became an MLA in 2013.

== Political views ==
He supports Congress Party's Ideology.

== Personal life ==
He is married to Prabha Singh.

== See also ==
- Madhya Pradesh Legislative Assembly
- 2013 Madhya Pradesh Legislative Assembly election
- 2008 Madhya Pradesh Legislative Assembly election
