= Siddharth Sukhlal Kushwaha =

Indian politician from Madhya Pradesh

Siddarth Sukhlal Kushwaha

Member of the Madhya Pradesh Legislative Assembly
- Incumbent
- Assumed office 2018
- Preceded by: Shankar Lal Tiwari
- Constituency: Satna

Personal details
- Party: Indian National Congress
- Parent: Sukhlal Kushwaha

Siddharth Sukhlal Kushwaha alias Dabbu is an Indian National Congress politician from Madhya Pradesh, who is serving as a member of the Madhya Pradesh Legislative Assembly from 2018 representing Satna Assembly constituency. He is a son of former Member of Indian Parliament Sukhlal Kushwaha, who was elected to lower house of Indian Parliament (Lok Sabha) from Satna Lok Sabha constituency by defeating former Chief Minister of Madhya Pradesh, Arjun Singh. Siddarth became M.L.A for the first time in 2018 Madhya Pradesh Assembly elections by defeating three term M.L.A., Shankarlal Tiwari. He also served as president of Other Backward Class wing of the Indian National Congress for the state of Madhya Pradesh.

== Political career ==
Kushwaha is a son of Sukhlal Kushwaha, a former Member of Indian Parliament, who was elected to Lok Sabha, the lower house of Indian Parliament from Satna Lok Sabha constituency. He contested the Assembly elections of 2018 and was elected as Member of Madhya Pradesh Legislative Assembly from Satna Assembly constituency. In this election, he defeated three term MLA Shankarlal Tiwari. The Assembly constituency, from which he is elected is considered as an OBC stronghold and in order to reap the benefits of caste equation, he was nominated as the candidate of Indian National Congress for the Mayor elections in the last year of his tenure as legislative assembly member. Soon afterwards, the INC leadership made him president of Other Backward Class wing of the party for the state of Madhya Pradesh. It was believed by the political analysts that this was done in a bid to reward him for not changing his loyalty during the fall of Indian National Congress government in 2020 political crisis.

Kushwaha is considered close to former Chief Minister of Madhya Pradesh, Kamal Nath. He was raised to the position of Other Backward Class wing of Madhya Pradesh Congress by replacing the Rajya Sabha member and veteran Congress leader, Rajmani Patel. Earlier, in Assembly elections conducted in Raigaon Assembly constituency, Kushwaha was given charge of campaign to ensure the victory of INC candidate. He was reported to have played significant role in ensuring the victory of INC candidate from this constituency, which was, until then, considered as stronghold of Bharatiya Janata Party.

In 2024 Lok Sabha Election Kushwaha lost by 84949 votes. BJP's Ganesh Singh defeated Kushwaha.

== Personal life ==
Kushwaha completed his bachelor's degree in 2007 from Government Swashasi College in Satna. He, besides being a politician, also runs a transport business. He belongs to OBC Kushwaha community.
