= Chitrakoot, Madhya Pradesh Assembly constituency =

Constituency of the Madhya Pradesh legislative assembly in India

Coordinates: 25.17°N 80.86°E

Chitrakoot
- Constituency No. 61 for the Madhya Pradesh Legislative Assembly

Constituency details
- Country: India
- Region: Central India
- State: Madhya Pradesh
- District: Satna
- Lok Sabha constituency: Satna
- Established: 1957
- Reservation: None

Member of Legislative Assembly
- 16th Madhya Pradesh Legislative Assembly
- Incumbent Surendra Singh Gaharwar
- Party: Bharatiya Janata Party
- Elected year: 2023
- Preceded by: Nilanshu Chaturvedi

Chitrakoot Assembly constituency is one of the 230 Vidhan Sabha (Legislative Assembly) constituencies of Madhya Pradesh state in central India.

== Members of Legislative Assembly ==
Election	Member	Party
1957	Kaushalendra Pratap Bahadur Singh	Akhil Bharatiya Ram Rajya Parishad
1967	Ramanand Singh	Praja Socialist Party
1972	Ram Chandra Bajpayee	Indian National Congress
1977	Ramanand Singh	Janata Party
1980	Ram Chandra Bajpayee	Indian National Congress
1985	Ram Chandra Bajpayee	Indian National Congress
1990	Ramanand Singh	Janata Dal
1993	Ganesh	Bahujan Samaj Party
1998	Prem Singh	Indian National Congress
2003	Prem Singh	Indian National Congress
2008	Surendra Singh Gaharwar	Bharatiya Janata Party
2013	Prem Singh	Indian National Congress
2017^	Nilanshu Chaturvedi	Indian National Congress
2018	Nilanshu Chaturvedi	Indian National Congress
2023	Surendra Singh Gaharwar	Bharatiya Janata Party

^ bypolls

== Election results ==
=== 2023 ===
2023 Madhya Pradesh Legislative Assembly election: Chitrakoot
Party	Candidate	Votes	%	±%
BJP	Surendra Singh Gaharwar	58,009	37.27	+3.5
INC	Nilanshu Chaturvedi	51,339	32.99	−7.91
BSP	Subhash Sharma	31,797	20.43	+3.63
SP	Sanjay Singh	6,347	4.08	
NOTA	None of the above	1,154	0.74	+0.43
Majority		6,670	4.28	−2.85
Turnout		155,631	71.09	−0.59
BJP gain from INC		Swing		

=== 2018 ===
2018 Madhya Pradesh Legislative Assembly election: Chitrakoot
Party	Candidate	Votes	%	±%
INC	Nilanshu Chaturvedi	58,465	40.9	
BJP	Surendra Singh Gaharwar	48,267	33.77	
BSP	Ravendra Singh Patwari	24,010	16.8	
Independent	Brijesh Pratap Singh	1,791	1.25	
Independent	Abhay Lal Yadav	1,339	0.94	
NOTA	None of the above	449	0.31	
Majority		10,198	7.13	
Turnout		142,947	71.68	
INC hold		Swing		

== See also ==
- Chitrakoot, Madhya Pradesh
