= Surendra Singh Gaharwar =

Indian politician

Surendra Singh Gaharwar (born 1954) is an Indian politician from Madhya Pradesh. He is a three time MLA from Chitrakoot Assembly constituency in Satna District. He won the 2023 Madhya Pradesh Legislative Assembly election, representing Bharatiya Janata Party.

== Early life and education ==
Singh is from Chitrakoot, Satna District, Madhya Pradesh. He is the son of Jagannath Singh. He completed his M.A. in 1976 at T. R. S. College, Rewa. He also did L.L.B. in 1983, and Diploma in labour law in 1984, at the Law College Satna, which is affiliated with Awadhesh Pratap Singh University, Rewa. His wife is a retired principal in a government college.

== Career ==
Singh won from Chitrakoot Assembly constituency in the 2023 Madhya Pradesh Legislative Assembly election representing Bharatiya Janata Party. He polled 58,009 votes and defeated his nearest rival, Neelanshu Chaturvedi of the Indian National Congress, by a margin of 6,670 votes. He first became an MLA winning the 2008 Madhya Pradesh Legislative Assembly election on BJP ticket from Chitrakoot. Then he lost to the Indian National Congress candidates, Prem Singh in the 2013 Madhya Pradesh Legislative Assembly election and to Neelanshu Chaturvedi in the 2017 by-election and the 2018 Madhya Pradesh Legislative Assembly election.
