= Rajendra Kumar Singh =

Indian politician

Member of the Madhya Pradesh Legislative Assembly
- In office 2013–2018
- Preceded by: Ramkhelawan Patel
- Succeeded by: Ramkhelawan Patel
- Constituency: Amarpatan
- In office 2003–2008
- Preceded by: Shivmohan Singh
- Succeeded by: Ramkhelawan Patel
- In office 1993–1998
- Preceded by: Ramhit Gupta
- Succeeded by: Shivmohan Singh
- In office 1980–1985
- Preceded by: Ramhit Gupta
- Succeeded by: Ramhit Gupta

Personal details
- Born: 3 September 1950 (age 75)
- Party: Indian National Congress
- Spouse: Ranjana Kumari Singh
- Children: 2
- Education: PhD
- Profession: Politician
- As of 27 July, 2018 Source: ["Biography: Rajendra Kumar Singh" (PDF). Madhya Pradesh Legislative Assembly.]

Rajendra Kumar Singh is an Indian politician and a member of the Indian National Congress party.

== Political career ==
He became an MLA in 2013, for the sixth time.

== Awards and recognition ==
He was a part of the Indian Contingent for World Peace Council in the year 1980 and toured Russia, Bulgaria and Romania.

== See also ==
- Madhya Pradesh Legislative Assembly
- 2013 Madhya Pradesh Legislative Assembly election
- 2003 Madhya Pradesh Legislative Assembly election
- 1993 Madhya Pradesh Legislative Assembly election
- 1980 Madhya Pradesh Legislative Assembly election
