= Deorajnagar =

New Deorajnagar Deora
- town
- Location in Madhya Pradesh, India
- Coordinates: 24°06′N 81°08′E
- Country: India
- State: Madhya Pradesh
- District: Satna

Languages
  - Official: Hindi
- Time zone: UTC+5:30 (IST)
- PIN: 485881
- Nearest city: Ramnagar, Madhya Pradesh
- Sex ratio: 95/100 ♂/♀

New Deorajnagar is a town in Madhya Pradesh state in central India. Ramnagar, Madhya Pradesh is nearest town from it. District headquarters of New Deorajnagar is the Satna District. It is approximately 65 kilometres from the city of Satna, 25 kilometers from Amarpatan and 5 kilometres from Ramnagar, Madhya Pradesh. On southern side it is surrounded by Bansagar Dam and on other side is Gidhakoot (Gidhaila).

== Education ==
New Deorajnagar has primary, middle and Hr. secondary government and private schools in its locality. For higher education, a study centre of M P Bhoj university is located here.

== Transportation ==
New Deorajnagar is connected to other cities and towns with road links. It is connected to Rewa, Satna. Nearest rail link to it is through Maihar, which is approximately 40 kilometres from Deorajnagar. Rewa, Satna and Beohari are also nearby.

== Temples ==
Two famous temples are located in this locality, Gidhakoot (Gidhaila) Sidhha baba Temple is located in Gidhakoot Parvat 2 kilometres from town, Hanuman Mandir New Deorajnagar near BSNL Tower, Janki Raman Mandir and another temple is Bindunagar temple 3 kilometres from the town. Gidhakoot (Gidhaila) parvat, laxminarayan mandir, Rajadhiraj mandir (under construction), Devi mandir of New Deorajnagar are also tourist places.

== Sub villages ==
Pipari, Gidhaila and Karra are sub villages of New Deorajnagar.
