= Yadvendra =

Yadvendra is an Indian masculine given name. Notable people with the name include:

- Yadvendra Singh (born 1953), Indian politician
- Yadvendra Singh Judeo (1893–1963), Indian military officer

== See also ==
- Yadavindra Singh (1913–1974), last ruling Indian Maharaja of Patiala
