= Birsinghpur =

- city
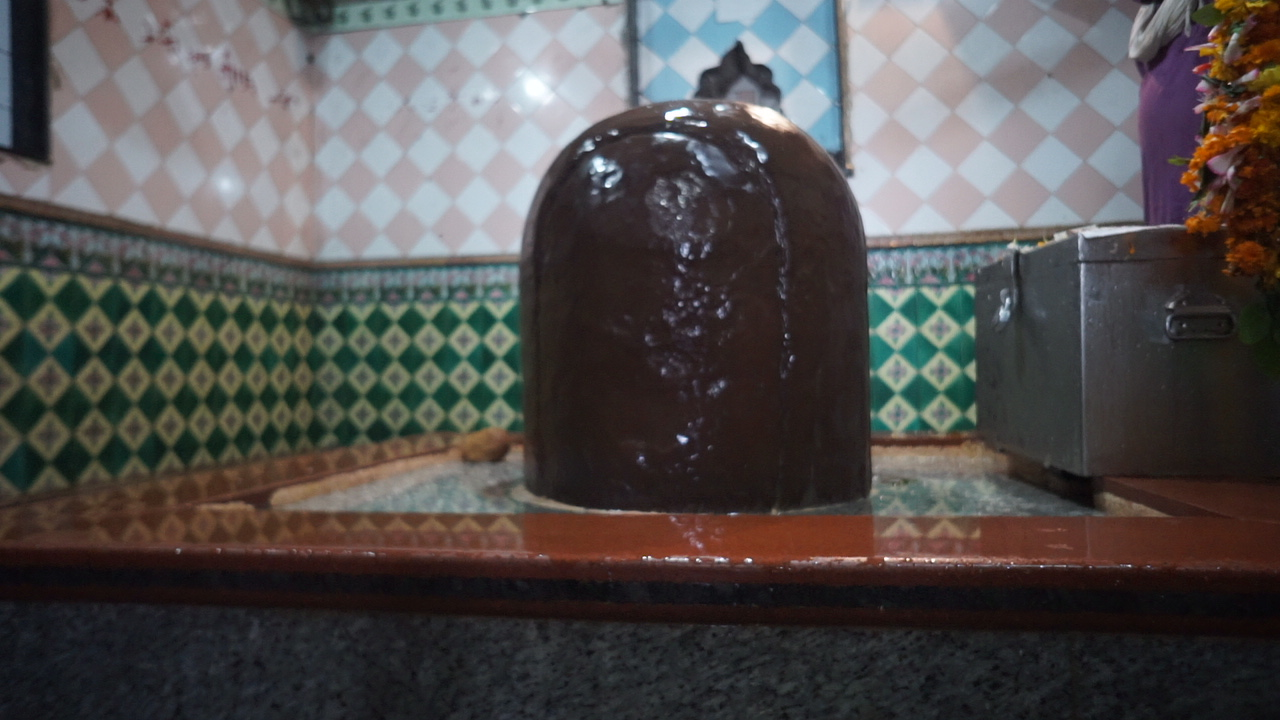
- Birsingpur Gaivinath Dham Satna Gaivinath Dham

- Location in Madhya Pradesh, india Birsinghpur (India)
- Coordinates: 24.4758°N 80.5819°E
- Country: India
- State: Madhya Pradesh
- District: Satna District

Area
  - Total: 289 km^{2} (112 sq mi)
  - Rank: 9

Population (2011)
  - Total: 132,469
  - Rank: 3
  - Density: 458/km^{2} (1,190/sq mi)

Languages
  - Official: Hindi
- Time zone: UTC+5:30 (IST)
- PIN: 485226
- Telephone code: 07671
- Vehicle registration: MP 19
- Website: satna.nic.in

Birsinghpur is a Nagar Parishad and sub district in Satna district in the state of Madhya Pradesh, India.

== Demographics ==
As of the 2011 Census of India, Birsinghpur had a population of 14339. Males constituted 52.21% of the population and females 47.79%.

== Geography ==
Birsinghpur is a Nagar Parishad on Madhya Pradesh and a tehseel of 134 villages and 1 Nagar Parishad. The city area is 43.5 kilometres (27.0 mi) in east, 37.2 kilometres (23.1 mi) is west, 37.9 kilometres (23.5 mi) north and 26.4 kilometres (16.4 mi) south. Birsinghpur is situated on the north east in Satna district, at a distance of about 34 km from Satna and 61 km from Rewa. Another two road goes from Birsinghpur to Rewa via Semariya and second Chitrakoot via Majhgawan at a distance of about 60 kilometres (37 mi). Another road goes from Birsinghpur to Satna, Madhya Pradesh via Jaitwar, Kothi (MP SH-52). Birsinghpur has a 10th century temple of Lord Shiva, which is also known as the Gaivinath temple. Birsinghpur is a one of major pilgrim center for local area around Satna and Rewa district.

== Infrastructure ==
There is a government hospital in Birsinghpur. The nearest airport is in Satna. There is also a government industrial training institute in Birsinghpur. Nearby tourist spot are Dharkundi Ashram, Sutikshna Ashram, and Sarbhanga.

== See also ==
- List of Hindu temples in India
