= Khamhariya Tiwariyan =

- village
- Location in Madhya Pradesh, India
- Coordinates: 24°36′23″N 80°57′10″E
- Country: India
- State: Madhya Pradesh
- District: Satna

Government
  - Body: Panchayat of Khamhariya

Population (2010)
  - Total: 1,100

Languages
  - Official: Hindi
- Time zone: UTC+5:30 (IST)
- Vehicle registration: MP-
- Coastline: 0 kilometres (0 mi)
- Nearest city: Satna
- Lok Sabha constituency: Satna
- Civic agency: Panchayat of Khamhariya

Khamhariya Tiwariyan is a village in Satna district of Madhya Pradesh, India. The place is renowned for dolomite mines. Also, there is one cement factory in the place which has led many to migrate to other places. The place is linked by road with the district and commercial place Satna. Rewa is 45 km from the place. it is just 12 km from Satna. Not so developed people from the village have migrated to many places in the district and other places in India in search of employment and education. There is higher secondary school situated in village and In past also known by Van Khamhariya.

== History ==
Migration to the place took place some 137 years ago and in 1873 the first horde of people came from nearby village Chooli which is still a vibrant place and many of relatives of the people who are living in Khamhariya are in Chooli. Tiwaris are the main caste which inhabit the placeand and Some dubey's(five families) lives there. Besides, there are some 300 chamar (scheduled Caste) who are considered low caste people. Some Kotwar (three families) are too living in the village.

== Economy ==
Agriculture is main profession of the village. Wheat, Arahar, chana, masoor, rice, etc. are some major crops. Soybean is a recent crop. However, after the liberalization there has been tremendous changes and people have started various other occupations and one of them is mining of stones for construction purposes, crashers of stones have come up at nearby places and are owned by people of the village. Very few people in the village stay - mostly women. Youngsters are either working in the Satna city or moved out to work in major metros of India such as Delhi, Mumbai, Indore, etc.

People at the place prefer to do various kinds of small and big jobs, and for that they send their wards to study in city schools. Though the village has a high school, most children from upper caste Brahmin families either stay in Satna and study in public school or commute to schools from the village. Newly built roads in the village connect it with Satna. People in Khamhariya own bikes and cars which are being used as a major mode of transportation.

Whereas Steel Authority of India Limited was a leading employer some decades ago, JP Cement has started its new plant at the place. Though the company cannot hire too many people yet it will provide indirect employment to villagers. A new hope is coming to stir up the life of people. People at the place are looking forward for higher standard of life and higher purchasing power after the industrialization. Matehna, a nearby place which is just five kilometers from the village is expected to become a SEZ.
