= Satna Assembly constituency =

Constituency of the Madhya Pradesh legislative assembly in India

Coordinates: 24.58°N 80.83°E

Satna
- Constituency No. 63 for the Madhya Pradesh Legislative Assembly

Constituency details
- Country: India
- Region: Central India
- State: Madhya Pradesh
- District: Satna
- Lok Sabha constituency: Satna
- Established: 1951
- Reservation: None

Member of Legislative Assembly
- 16th Madhya Pradesh Legislative Assembly
- Incumbent Siddharth Sukhlal Kushwaha
- Party: Indian National Congress
- Elected year: 2023
- Preceded by: Shankar Lal Tiwari

Satna Assembly constituency is one of the 230 Vidhan Sabha (Legislative Assembly) constituencies of Madhya Pradesh state in central India.

== Members of Legislative Assembly ==
=== Vindhya Pradesh Legislative Assembly ===
Year	Member	Party
1952	Shiv Nand	Indian National Congress

=== Madhya Pradesh Legislative Assembly ===
Year	Member	Party
1957	Shiv Nand	Indian National Congress
1962	Sukhendra Singh	Bharatiya Jana Sangh
1967	K. Parekh	Indian National Congress
1972	Kanta	Indian National Congress
1977	Arun Singh	Janata Party
1980	Lalta Prasad Khare	Indian National Congress (Indira)
1985	Lalta Prasad Khare	Indian National Congress
1990	Brinjendra Pathak	Bharatiya Janata Party
1993	Brinjendra Pathak	Bharatiya Janata Party
1998	Sayeed Ahmed	Indian National Congress
2003	Shankar Lal Tiwari	Bharatiya Janata Party
2008	Shankar Lal Tiwari	Bharatiya Janata Party
2013	Shankar Lal Tiwari	Bharatiya Janata Party
2018	Siddharth Sukhlal Kushwaha	Indian National Congress
2023	Siddharth Sukhlal Kushwaha	Indian National Congress

== Election results ==
=== 2023 ===
2023 Madhya Pradesh Legislative Assembly election: Satna
Party	Candidate	Votes	%	±%
INC	Siddharth Sukhlal Kushwaha	70,638	39.61	+2.37
BJP	Ganesh Singh	66,597	37.35	+7.89
BSP	Shiva Ratnakar Chaturvedi	33,567	18.82	−2.91
Vindhya Janta Party	Hari Om Gupta	1,644	0.92	
NOTA	None of the above	888	0.5	−0.1
Majority		4,041	2.26	−5.52
Turnout		178,327	72.51	+2.6
INC hold		Swing		

=== 2018 ===
2018 Madhya Pradesh Legislative Assembly election: Satna
Party	Candidate	Votes	%	±%
INC	Siddharth Sukhlal Kushwaha	60,105	37.24	
BJP	Shankarlal Tiwari	47,547	29.46	
BSP	Pushkar Singh Tomar	35,064	21.73	
Sapaks Party	Ramoram Gupta	7,984	4.95	
NOTA	None of the above	973	0.6	
Majority		12,558	7.78	
Turnout		161,387	69.91	
INC gain from		Swing		

== See also ==
- Satna
