= Satna Airport =

Airport in Satna, Madhya Pradesh, India

- IATA: TNI; ICAO: VEST

Summary
- Airport type: Public
- Operator: Airport Authority of India
- Location: Satna, Madhya Pradesh
- Elevation AMSL: 1,060 ft (320 m)
- Coordinates: 24°33′26″N 080°51′48″E

Map
- Location in Madhya Pradesh TNI (India)

Runways
Direction	Length		Surface
Direction	ft	m	Surface
11/29	6,093	1,857	Asphalt

Statistics (April 2025 – March 2026)
- Passengers: 0 ( 0%)
- Aircraft movements: 0 ( 0%)
- Cargo tonnage: 0 ( 0%)
- Source: AAI

Satna Airport (IATA: TNI, ICAO: VEST) is a domestic airport near Satna in Madhya Pradesh, India. It is operated by the Airports Authority of India (AAI).

AAI commenced the airport's development in January 2024, as part of the Government's UDAN Regional Connectivity Scheme, constructing a 1200 metre long runway and a terminal building. The airport received its aerodrome licence from the DGCA in December 2024.

== See also ==
- Airports in India
- List of busiest airports in India by passenger traffic
