= Jaitwara =

- Town
- Location in Madhya Pradesh, India Jaitwara (India)
- Coordinates: 24°44′15″N 80°52′20″E
- Country: India
- State: Madhya Pradesh
- District: Satna

Population (2001)
  - Total: 8,903

Languages
  - Official: Hindi
- Time zone: UTC+5:30 (IST)
- ISO 3166 code: IN-MP

Jaitwara is a town and a nagar panchayat in Satna district in the Indian state of Madhya Pradesh.

== Demographics ==
As of 2001 India census, Jaitwara had a population of 8,903. Males constitute 51% of the population and females 49%. Jaitwara has an average literacy rate of 59%, lower than the national average of 59.5%: male literacy is 69%, and female literacy is 50%. In Jaitwara, 18% of the population is under 6 years of age. It is located near the border of Uttar Pradesh. The nearest city is Satna.
