= Shivanand =

Indian politician

Shivanand

Shivanand (3 January 1922 – 31 October 2006) was an Indian politician and a freedom fighter from Satna district of Madhya Pradesh. He was President of Rewa Rajya Praja Mandal from December 1946 to January 1948 and was jailed five times during freedom struggle and expelled from Rewa state many times. He was elected from Satna Constituency to the Vindhya Pradesh Legislative assembly in 1952 and sworn in as Speaker of that assembly. He was also member of Madhya Pradesh Legislative assembly from 1957-62 along with Vishweshwar Prasad.

During 1952–56 and 1959–62, he served as State Convener (Pradesh Sanyojak) of the Bharat Sewak Samaj under the leadership of Pt. Nehru and Gulzarilal Nanda and was very closely associated with them.

He authored many books namely Satna Nagar, Madhya Pradesh ke pratham patrakar - Lal Baldeo Singh, Mahatma Gandhi - Ek Vibhuti, Bundelkhand -Baghelkhand and Hindu.
