= Nagod =

- Town
- Nickname: Nagaudh
- Location in Madhya Pradesh, India
- Coordinates: 24.57°N 80.6°E
- Country: India
- State: Madhya Pradesh
- District: Satna

Government
  - MP: Ganesh Singh (BJP)
  - MLA: Nagendra Singh (BJP)
- Elevation: 330 m (1,080 ft)

Population (2011)
  - Total: 22,568

Languages
  - Official: Hindi
- Time zone: UTC+5:30 (IST)
- Pin Code: 485446
- Telephone: 07673
- Vehicle registration: MP-19-XXXX

Nagod or Nagaud is a town and a nagar panchayat in Satna district in the Indian state of Madhya Pradesh. It is located 17 miles (27 km) from the town of Satna. It is the administrative headquarters of Nagod Tehsil.

== Origin ==
Nagod derives its name from Nagdev meaning town or city.

== Geography ==
Nagod is located at 24.57°N 80.6°E. It has an average elevation of 330 metres (1,082 feet). Nagod is near to the district headquarters at Satna. The Amarna river flows near the town's fort.

== Princely history ==
Nagod was formerly the capital of a princely state of British India, Nagod State. The state was founded in 1344, and until the 18th century was known as Unchahara from the name of its original capital.

== Demographics ==
As of 2011 India census, Nagod had a population of 22,568. Males constitute 53% of the population and females 47%. Nagod has an average literacy rate of 68%, higher than the national average of 59.5%: male literacy is 76%, and female literacy is 60%. In Nagod, 16% of the population is under 6 years of age.

== Education ==
Nagod has several institutions providing primary, secondary, and higher education for the town and nearby rural areas. Higher education is primarily provided by Government College, Nagod, established in 1984 and affiliated with Awadhesh Pratap Singh University, Rewa, offering undergraduate and postgraduate programs in arts, science, and commerce. The town also has government and private higher secondary schools affiliated with the Madhya Pradesh Board of Secondary Education (MPBSE) and the Central Board of Secondary Education (CBSE), along with vocational training institutes.

== Culture and cuisine ==
Nagod is locally known for a traditional milk-based sweet called Khurchan and Samosa is also an famous and well eaten cuisine in Nagod.

== See also ==
- Nagod (Vidhan Sabha constituency)
