= Ramanand Singh =

Indian politician (born 1937)

MP

Personal details
- Born: 25 June 1937 (age 87); Karigohi (Madhya Pradesh)
- Political party: Bharatiya Janata Party
- Spouse: Subhadra Devi
- Children: Three Sons, One Daughter
- Education: B.A., LL.B.

Ramanand Singh (born 25 June 1937) is an Indian politician. He was member 12th and 13th Lok Sabha representing BJP from Satna constituency of Madhya Pradesh. In 1967, he became a member of Rajya Sabha for the first time. In 1977 he became Cabinet Minister in Government of Madhya Pradesh for Forest, Local Self-Government, Public Health and Engineering Department in Janata Party government.

== Positions held ==
1967–72	Member, Madhya Pradesh Legislative Assembly
1968–70	General-Secretary, Praja Socialist Party (P.S.P.), Madhya Pradesh
1970–72	General-Secretary/President, P.S.P., Madhya Pradesh
1977–80	Member, Madhya Pradesh Legislative Assembly
1977–80	Cabinet Minister, Forest, Local Self-Government, Public Health and Engineering Department, Madhya Pradesh
	Member, Madhya Pradesh State Railways Transport Corporation Enquiry Committee
1980–85	General-Secretary, Janata Party, Madhya Pradesh
1986–87	President, Janata Party, Madhya Pradesh
1989–91	Vice-President, Janata Dal, Madhya Pradesh
1990–92	Member, Madhya Pradesh Legislative Assembly (three terms)
1990–92	Leader, Janata Dal, Madhya Pradesh Legislative Assembly
	Member, Committee on Public Accounts
	Member, Committee on Estimates
1998	Elected to 12th Lok Sabha
1998 onwards	Vice-President, Bharatiya Janata Party, Madhya Pradesh
1998–99	Member, Committee on Industry
	Member, Joint Committee on the Functioning of Wakf Boards
	Member, Consultative Committee, Ministry of Railways
1999	Re-elected to 13th Lok Sabha (2nd term)
1999–2000	Member, Committee on Industry
1999–2001	Member, Telephone Advisory Committee, Ministry of Communications
2000–2004	Member, Consultative Committee, Ministry of Communications
