= Kalpana Verma =

Indian politician

Kalpana Verma is an Indian politician who is serving as Member of 15th Madhya Pradesh Assembly from Raigaon Assembly constituency.

== Personal life ==
She was born in 1989.
