= Gulsher Ahmad =

Indian politician

9th Governor of Himachal Pradesh
- In office 1993–1993

Member of Lok Sabha
- Constituency: Satna

Speaker of Madhya Pradesh Vidhan Sabha

Member of Madhya Pradesh Legislative Assembly
- Constituency: Amarpatan

Personal details
- Born: 3 August 1921 Madhya Pradesh, British India
- Died: 20 May 2002 (aged 80) Satna, Madhya Pradesh, India
- Party: Indian National Congress
- Children: Sayeed Ahmad (son)
- Occupation: Barrister, Politician

Gulsher Ahmed (3 August 1921 – 20 May 2002) was a leader of the Indian National Congress. He studied in England and became a barrister. He was speaker Madhya Pradesh Vidhan Sabha, MLA and also MP from Satna Lok Sabha constituency. He was the 9th governor of Himachal Pradesh in 1993. He hailed from Madhya Pradesh. He contested from Amarpatan constituency for state assembly. He died in 2002 in Satna.

His son Sayeed Ahmad was also an MLA and became minister of state (finance and commercial tax).

Gulsher Ahmad had to resign from governor post when the Election Commission indicted him for campaigning for his son.
