= Nagendra Singh (politician, born 1943) =

Indian politician

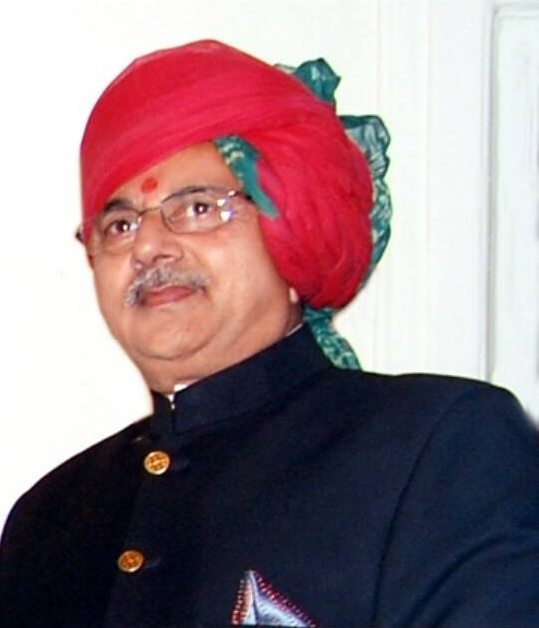

Member of Legislative Assembly Madhya Pradesh
- Incumbent
- Assumed office 2018
- Preceded by: Yadavendra Singh
- Constituency: Nagod
- In office 2003–2013
- Preceded by: Ram Pratap Singh
- Succeeded by: Yadavendra Singh
- Constituency: Nagod

Member, Indian Parliament
- In office 16 May 2014 – 23 May 2019
- Preceded by: Jeetendra Singh Bundela
- Succeeded by: V. D. Sharma
- Constituency: Khajuraho

Minister of the Government of Madhya Pradesh
- In office 2005–2013

Personal details
- Born: 2 March 1943 (age 83) Nagod, Central Provinces and Berar, British India
- Party: Bharatiya Janata Party
- Spouse: Tara Rajya Luxmi
- Children: 2
- Education: B.Com. from Allahabad University
- Website: Nagendra Singh

Nagendra Singh (born 2 March 1943) is a member of the Bharatiya Janata Party and has won the 2014 Indian general elections from the Khajuraho (Lok Sabha constituency). He was previously a minister in the Government of Madhya Pradesh before becoming Member of Parliament.

== Early life and education ==
Nagendra Singh was born into the erstwhile royal family of Nagod State, India, as the son of Maharaja Mahendra Singh and Maharani Shyam Kumari. Singh married Tara Rajya Luxmi and has two sons. Singh has taken degree of Bachelor of Commerce from Allahabad University.

== Career ==
Singh has won several elections. He fought election from Nagod (Vidhan Sabha constituency) and won then became the cabinet minister of Madhya Pradesh Government in the ministry of Shivraj Singh Chouhan. Singh was elected as a Member of Legislative Assembly of Madhya Pradesh.

== Position and responsibility ==
- 1977 - 1985 : Member of the Legislative Assembly, Madhya Pradesh
- 2005 - 2007 : Minister of State, Govt. of Madhya Pradesh
- 2003 - 2008 : Member of the Legislative Assembly, Madhya Pradesh
- 2008 - 2013 : Minister, Govt. of Madhya Pradesh
- May 2014 : Member of the Legislative Assembly, Madhya Pradesh
- 1 Sep. 2014 onwards : Elected to 16th Lok Sabha
- 15 Sep. 2014 onwards : Member, Standing Committee on Science & Technology, Environment & Forests
- March. 2015 onwards : Member of water Conservation Committee
- MLA from Nagod 2018-2023
- MLA from Nagod 2023-

== Social activity ==
Singh promoted cultural activity in the form of "Nagod Mahotsav". Preservation of Wild Life, Forest and Environment.
