= Ganesh Singh =

Indian politician

Member of Parliament, Lok Sabha
- Incumbent
- Assumed office 13 May 2004
- Preceded by: Ramanand Singh
- Constituency: Satna

Personal details
- Born: 2 July 1962 (age 64) Satna, Madhya Pradesh, India
- Party: Bharatiya Janata Party
- Spouse: Mona Singh
- Children: Sankalp Singh, Vikalp Singh
- Parent(s): Kamal Bhan Singh, Phoolmati Singh
- Education: Awadhesh Pratap Singh University, Rewa
- Website: www.GaneshSingh.in

Ganesh Singh (Hindi pronunciation: [gəɳeːʃ sɪŋgʱ]) is an Indian politician belonging to BJP and a member of parliament from Satna (Lok Sabha constituency), Madhya Pradesh. He is elected 5 times in a row from this constituency (14th Lok Sabha, 15th Lok Sabha, 16th Lok Sabha, 17th Lok Sabha & 18th Lok Sabha).

== Early life and education ==
Ganesh Singh was born on 2 July 1962 in Gram Panchyat Khamahariya, Satna district, Madhya Pradesh State in a Kurmi family. He is the second of seven children born to Kamal Bhan Singh and Phoolmati Singh.

He started is political career as a general secretary of law college then becoming president of law college, he came close to socialist leaders of janta party and started working with them. He was also heading socialist youth of Madhya Pradesh State in 1989, he contested Zilla panchayat member elections in 1994 and won by huge margin, again in 1999 he became member of Zilla panchayat of Satna this time he became chairman of Zilla panchayat Satna with minister of state in charge. He is known for development in Vindhya region, he worked hard for the development of gram panchayats and providing the basic facilities of health, sanitation, education, irrigation, infrastructure at panchayat level, functioning of panchayats, providing drinking water, developing dams and small ponds. After seeing all his work public wanted him see in bigger role therefore he contested Lok Sabha elections in 2004 and won with huge margin of 85,000 and after that never looked back.

He did his Bachelor of Arts (BA) in 1981, Master of Arts (MA) in 1984, L.L.B in 1986, All the degrees from Awadhesh Pratap University, Rewa district, [Madhya Pradesh State].

In 2024 Lok Sabha Election, Singh won with 4,59,728 votes. He defeated INC candidate Siddharth Sukhlal Kushwaha by 84949 votes.

== Positions held ==
1995-1999	Member, Zila Parishad, Satna
1999-2004	Member of Zila Panchayat, Satna
1999 - 2004	President of Zila Panchayat, Satna (Minister of State-in-Charge)
2004	Elected to 14th Lok Sabha Member, Standing Committee on Industry
5 Aug. 2007	Member, Standing Committee on Human Resource Development Member, Standing Committee on Industry
2009	Re-elected to 15th Lok Sabha (2nd Term)
6 Aug. 2009	Member, Committee on Public Undertakings
31 Aug. 2009	Member, Standing Committee on Energy
2011-2016	Secretary BJP Madhya Pradesh
3 May 2013	Member, Committee on Welfare of Other Backward Classes (OBCs)
May, 2014	Re-elected to 16th Lok Sabha (3rd Term)
14 Aug. 2014 (onwards)	Member, Committee on Estimates
13 June 2014 (onwards)	Member, Business Advisory Committee
1 Sep. 2014 (onwards)	Member, Rules Committee Member, Standing Committee on Railways Member, Consultative Committee, Ministry of Road Transport and Highways and Shipping Executive Member, Nursing Council of India Secretary BJP Parliamentary Party
13 May 2015 - 20 July 2016	Member, Joint Committee on the Right to Fair Compensation and Transparency in Land Acquisition, Rehabilitation and Resettlement (Second Amendment) Bill, 2015
3 July 2015 - 30 April 2016	Member, Sub Committee-II, Committee on Estimates on the subject `Finances of Railways
26 Aug. 2015 - 30 April 2016	Member, Sub-Committee of the Committee on Estimates on the subject `Panchayati Raj`
19 July 2016 onward	Chairperson, Committee on Welfare of Other Backward Classes
20 July 2016 onwards	Chairperson, Joint Committee on the Right to Fair Compensation and Transparency in Land Acquisition, Rehabilitation and Resettlement (Second Amendment) Bill, 2015
May, 2019	Re-elected to 17th Lok Sabha (4th Term)
31 July 2019	Chairperson, Committee on Welfare of Other Backward Classes
13 Sept 2019	Member, Standing Committee on Labour, Textiles and Skill Development
09 Oct 2019	Member, Committee of Privileges
13 Sept 2021	Member, Consultative Committee, Ministry of Environment, Forest and Climate Change
13 Sept 2021	Member, Standing Committee on Communications and Information Technology
2024	Re-elected to 18th Lok Sabha (5th Term)

== Questions details in Parliament ==
Questions details in Parliament
Date	Title	Ministry or Category
13.02.2025	Achievements under Hamara Shauchalaya Hamara Samman	Jal Shakti
13.02.2025	Development of Satna Airport	Civil Aviation
13.02.2025	Benefits to Farmers on Implementation of PMKSY	Food Processing Industries
10.02.2025	Development of Rampath Gaman	Tourism
19.12.2024	Impact of UDAN Scheme	Civil Aviation
18.12.2024	Projects under PM-SGMBY	New and Renewable Energy
12.12.2024	Packaged Food Companies	Food Processing Industries
11.12.2024	Manpower in Government Departments	Prime Minister
10.12.2024	Performance of Steel Sector	Steel
10.12.2024	Identification of Villages under PMGSY	Rural Development
09.12.2024	New Opportunities of Employment	Labour and Employment
06.12.2024	PM-PRANAM	Chemicals and Fertilizers

== Awards ==
- Honored with Bharat Gaurav Award 2021
