= Ramhit Gupta =

Indian politician

Ramhit Gupta (1932- 2013) was an Indian politician and a leader of the Bharatiya Janata Party. He was the finance minister for the state government of Madhya Pradesh. He represented Amarpatan (Vidhan Sabha constituency) in the Madhya Pradesh Legislative Assembly. He died in 2013.
