= Raigaon Assembly constituency =

Constituency of the Madhya Pradesh legislative assembly in India

Coordinates: 24.66°N 80.69°E

Raigaon
- Constituency No. 62 for the Madhya Pradesh Legislative Assembly

Constituency details
- Country: India
- Region: Central India
- State: Madhya Pradesh
- District: Satna
- Lok Sabha constituency: Satna
- Established: 2008
- Reservation: SC

Member of Legislative Assembly
- 16th Madhya Pradesh Legislative Assembly
- Incumbent Pratima Bagri
- Party: Bharatiya Janata Party
- Elected year: 2023
- Preceded by: Kalpana Verma

Raigaon is one of the 230 Vidhan Sabha (Legislative Assembly) constituencies of Madhya Pradesh state in central India.

It is reserved for members of the Scheduled Castes and comprises parts of Raghurajnagar tehsil and Nagod tehsil, both in Satna district. As of 2023, it is represented by Pratima Bagri of the Bharatiya Janata Party.

== Members of the Legislative Assembly ==
Election	Member	Party
2008	Jugul Kishore Bagri	Bharatiya Janata Party
2013	Usha Choudhary	Bahujan Samaj Party
2018	Jugal Kishore Bagri	Bharatiya Janata Party
2021 (Note: bypoll)	Kalpana Verma	Indian National Congress
2023	Pratima Bagri	Bharatiya Janata Party

== Election results ==
=== 2023 ===
2023 Madhya Pradesh Legislative Assembly election: Raigaon
Party	Candidate	Votes	%	±%
BJP	Pratima Bagri	77,626	49.42	+7.17
INC	Kalpana Verma	41,566	26.46	−24.34
BSP	Devraj Ahirwar	27,743	17.66	
Vindhya Janta Party	Rani Bagri	2,240	1.43	
AAP	Varun Gujar 'Dinkal'	1,938	1.23	
NOTA	None of the above	991	0.63	−0.37
Majority		36,060	22.96	+14.41
Turnout		157,076	71.4	+2.14
BJP gain from INC		Swing		

=== 2021 bypoll ===
By-election, 2021: Raigaon
Party	Candidate	Votes	%	±%
INC	Kalpana Verma	72,989	50.8	+17.60
BJP	Pratima Bagri	60,699	42.25	−2.88
Independent	Ram Naresh	1,641	1.14	
NOTA	None of the above	1,436	1.0	+0.26
Majority		12,290	8.55	−3.38
Turnout		143,672	69.26	−4.24
INC gain from BJP		Swing		

=== 2018 ===
2018 Madhya Pradesh Legislative Assembly election: Raigaon
Party	Candidate	Votes	%	±%
BJP	Jugal Bagri	65,910	45.13	
INC	Kalpana Verma	48,489	33.2	
BSP	Usha Chaudhary	16,677	11.42	
Independent	Devraj Ahirwar	2,319	1.59	
Independent	Rajendra Kumar	1,687	1.16	
AAP	Upendra Kumar Dahayat	1,578	1.08	
Independent	Savitri Arjun Singh	1,503	1.03	
Independent	Dharbendra Ram Naresh Chaudhary	1,416	0.97	
NOTA	None of the above	1,084	0.74	
Majority		17,421	11.93	
Turnout		146,058	73.5	
BJP gain from		Swing		
