= Chitrakoot, Madhya Pradesh =

Chitrakoot
- Town
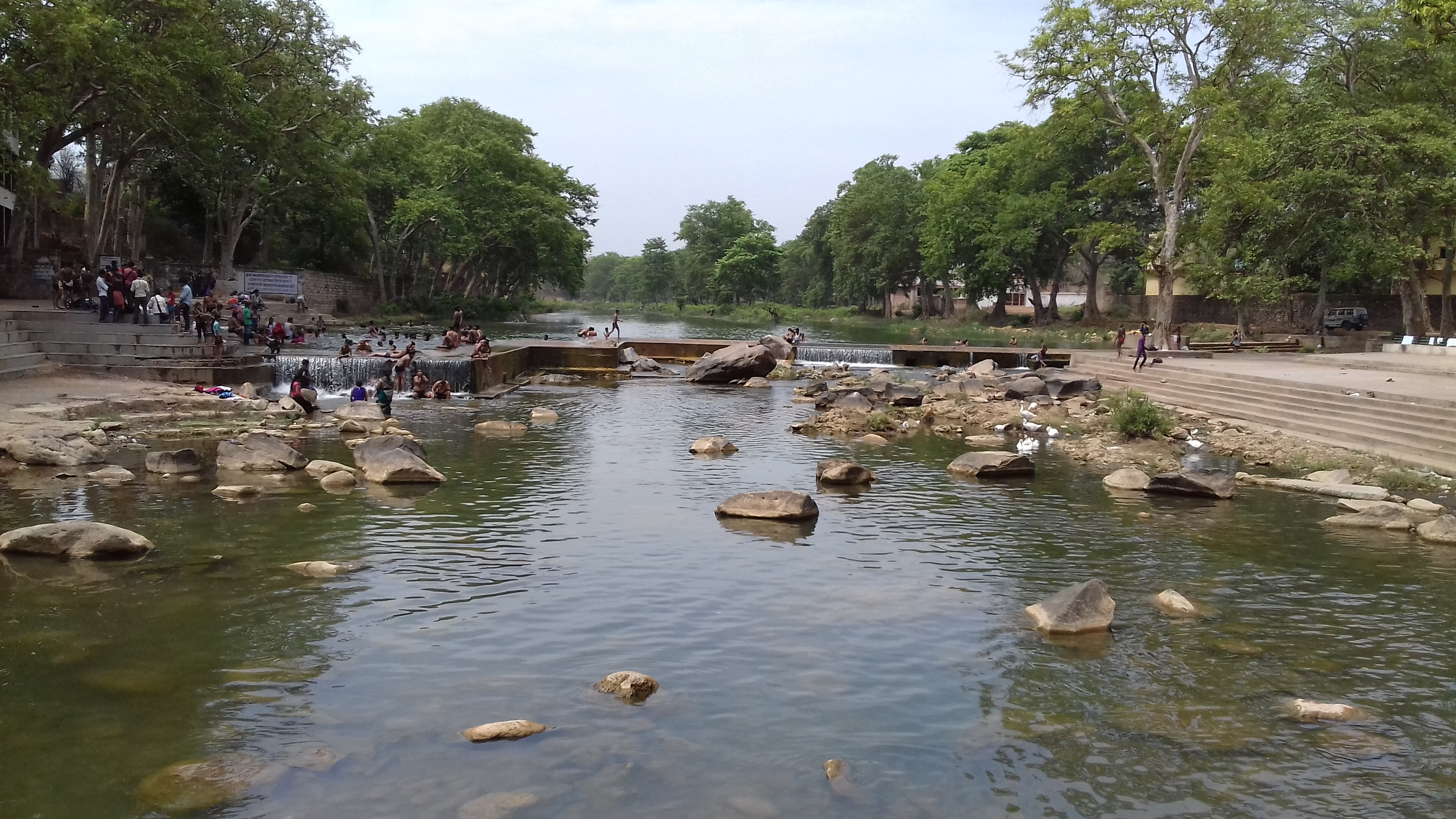
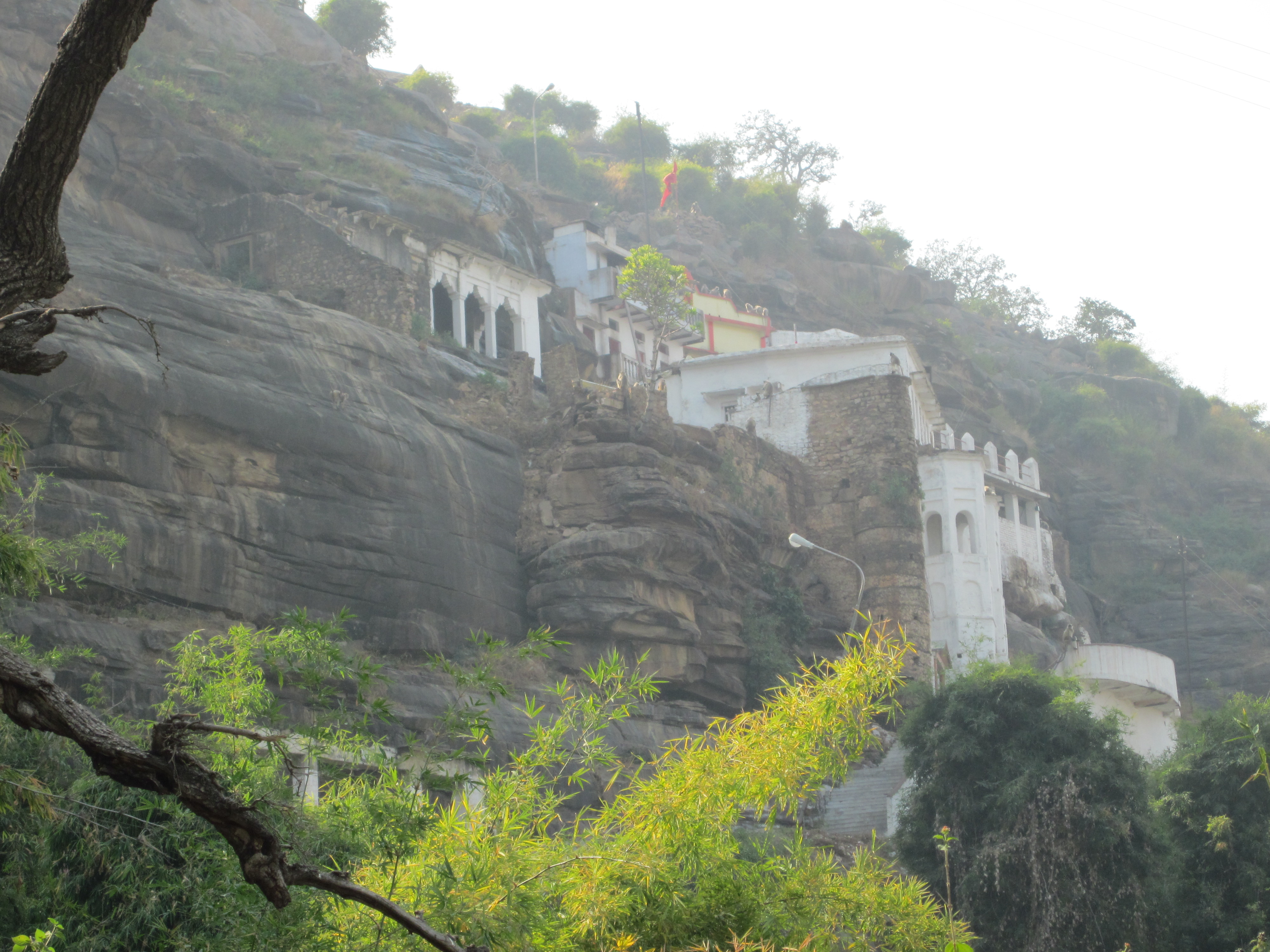
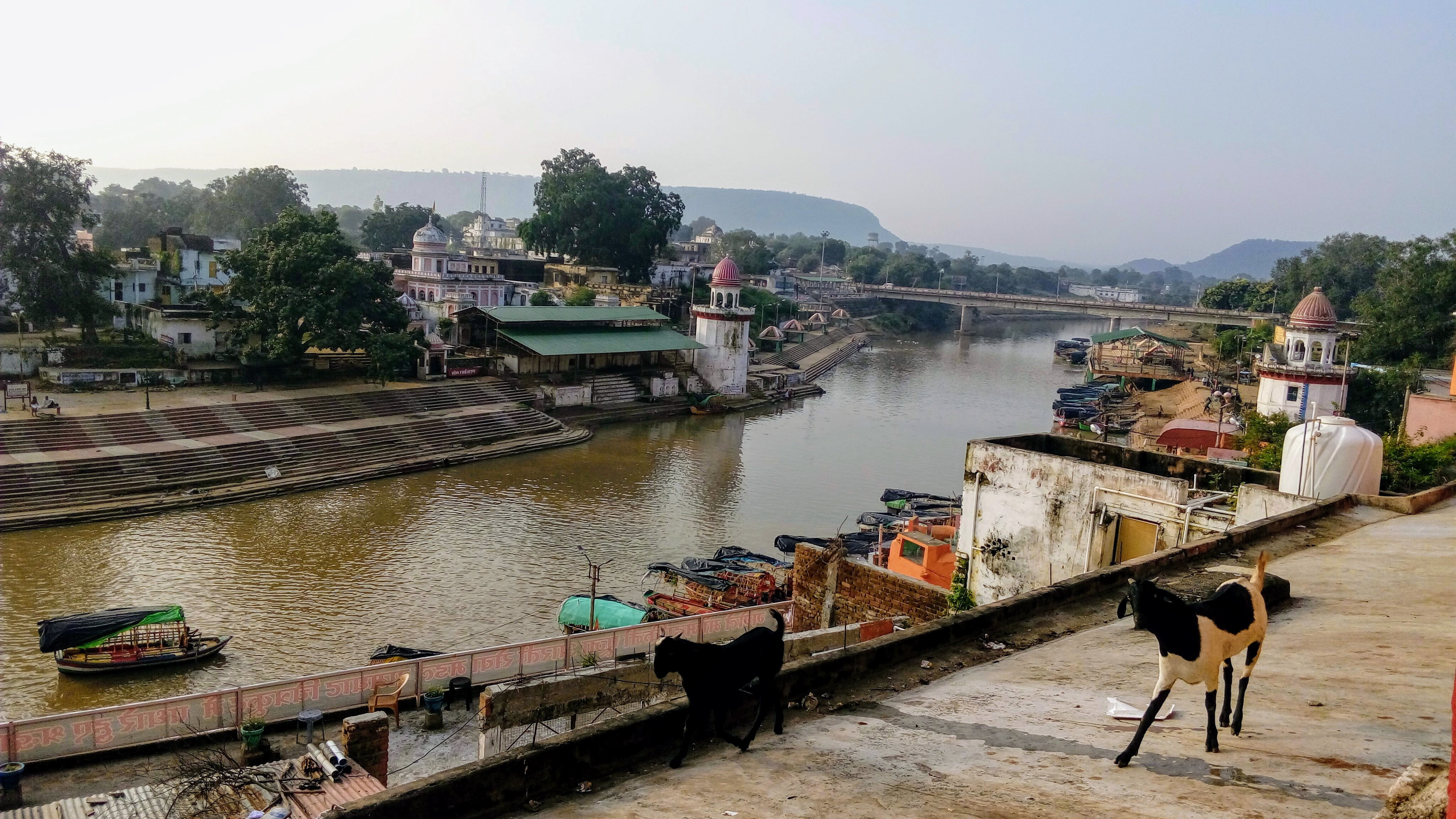
- Mandakini river, View of ghats at Chitrakoot, Temples in Hanuman Dhara

- Location within Madhya Pradesh
- Coordinates: 25.00°N 80.83°E
- Country: India
- State: Madhya Pradesh
- District: Satna

Population (2011)
  - Total: 23,316

Languages
  - Official: Hindi
- Time zone: UTC+5:30 (IST)
- ISO 3166 code: IN-MP
- Vehicle registration: MP-19

Chitrakoot is a pilgrimage centre and a nagar panchayat in the Satna district in the state of Madhya Pradesh, India. Connected to the Indian epic Ramayana, it is a place of religious, cultural, historical and archaeological importance, situated in the Baghelkhand region. It borders the Chitrakoot district in Uttar Pradesh, whose headquarters Chitrakoot Dham is located nearby. The city lies in the historical Chitrakoot region, which is divided between the present-day Indian states of Uttar Pradesh and Madhya Pradesh. It is known for a number of temples and sites mentioned in Hindu scriptures.

It attracts pilgrims throughout the year on occasions such as Amavasya, Somwati Amavasya, Deepavali, Sharad-Poornima, Makar Sankranti, Rama Navami and for Free Eye Care Medical Camps. Noted 'Ayurvedic' and 'Yoga' centres like 'Arogyadham' are located in Chitrakoot.

== Legend ==
Chitrakuta, identified with modern Chitrakoot, is one of the important places connected to the epic Ramayana. It is here where Rama's brother Bharata fails to persuade Rama to return to Ayodhya to become king at the very start of his exile. It is where Rama performed the last rites of his dead father Dasharatha in the presence of all the gods and goddesses. The forests of Chitrakuta is where Rama, Sita, and Lakshmana took refuge and spent 14 years in the woods, which was already home to several hermits. The ancient Indian sages, including Atri, Agastya, and Sharabhanga, were said to have meditated in the forests of Chitrakuta.

== Geography ==
Chitrakoot means the 'Hill of many wonders'. Chitrakoot region falls in the northern Vindhya Range spread over the states of Uttar Pradesh and Madhya Pradesh. The region is included in the Chitrakoot district of Uttar Pradesh and the Satna district of Madhya Pradesh. Chitrakoot district in Uttar Pradesh was created on 4 September 1998.

== Demographics ==
As of the 2011 Census of India, Chitrakoot had a population of 23,316. Males constitute 54.36% of the population and females 45.63%, making the Female Sex Ratio of 840 against the state average of 931. Chitrakoot has an average literacy rate of 70.01%, lower than the national average of 74% and higher than the state average of 69.32%; with male literacy of 79.49% and female literacy of 58.40%. 15.72% of the population is under 6 years of age.
