= Satna =

- City
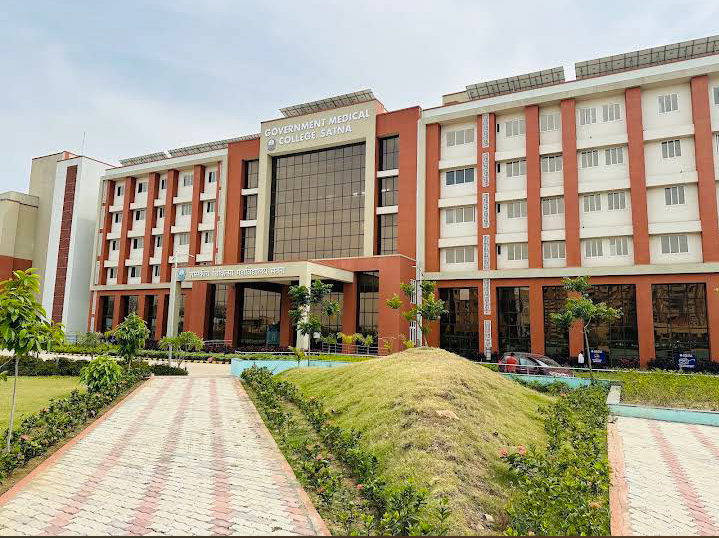
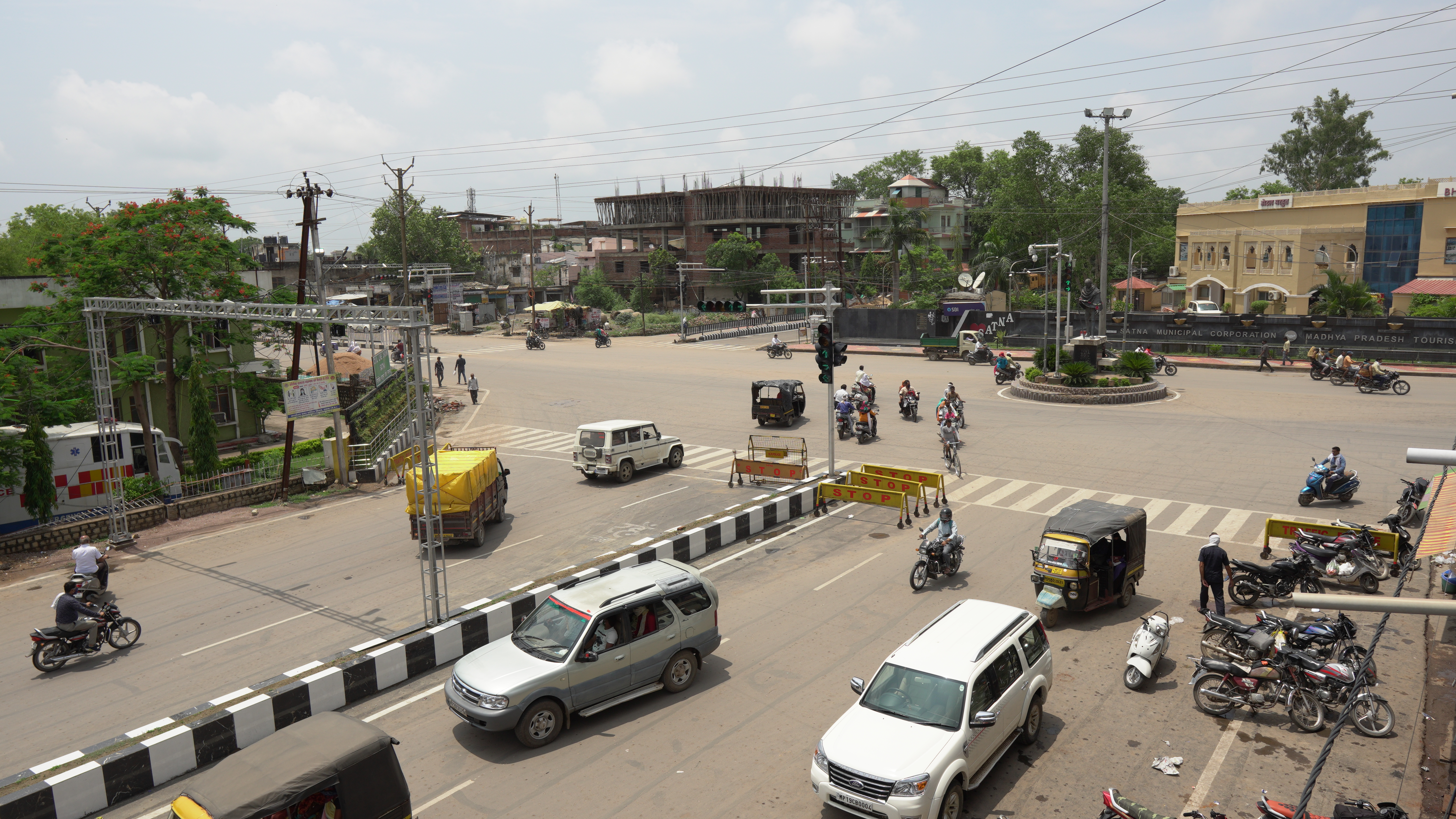
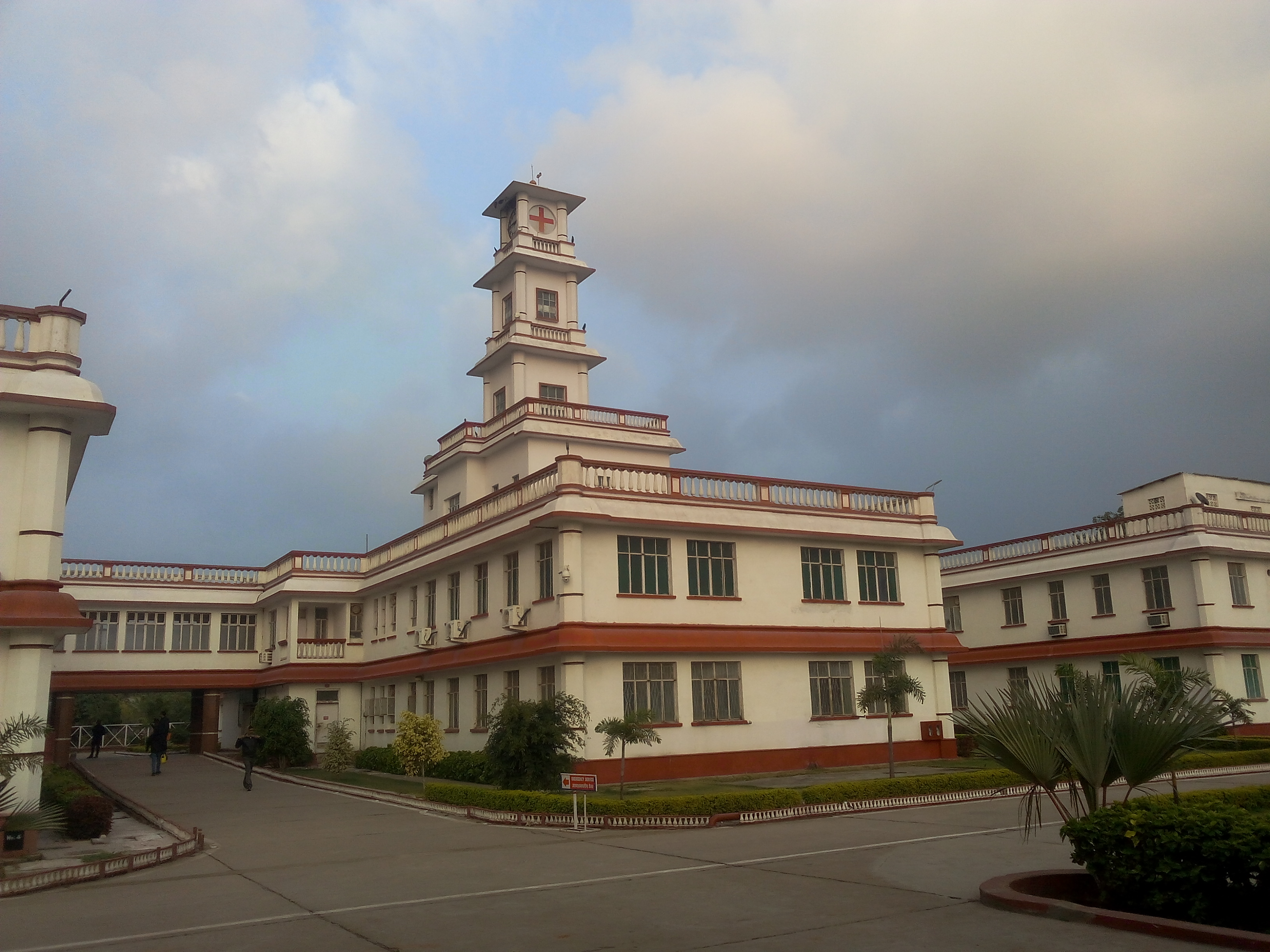
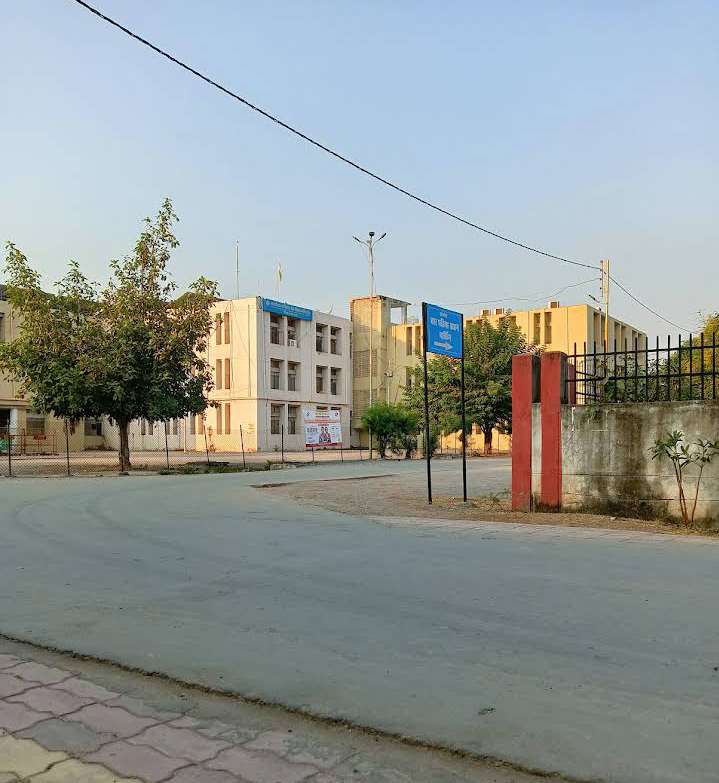
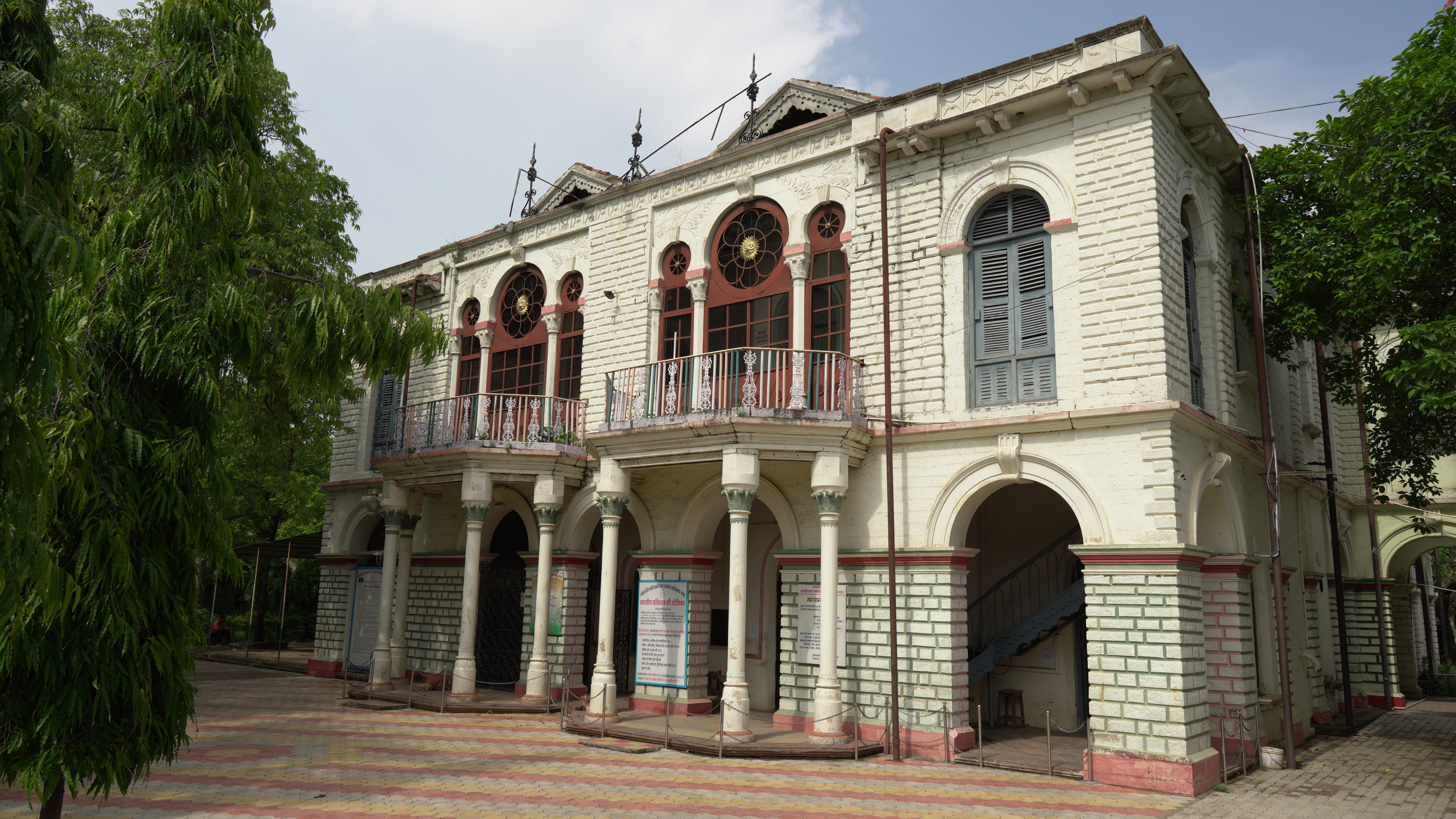
- Satna Medical College Building Satna - Civil Line Square Birla Hospital, Satna Collectorate Satna mp Indira College Satna

- Location within Madhya Pradesh Location within India
- Coordinates: 24°34′28.938″N 80°49′58.198″E
- Country: India
- State: Madhya Pradesh
- District: Satna

Government
  - Type: Mayor–council
  - Body: Satna Municipal Corporation
  - Mayor: Yogesh Tamrakar
  - MP: Ganesh Singh (BJP)
  - MLA: Siddharth Kushwaha (INC)

Area
  - City: 71 km^{2} (27 sq mi)
  - Metro: 111.9 km^{2} (43.2 sq mi)
- Elevation: 315 m (1,033 ft)

Population (2011)
  - City: 280,222
  - Rank: 8th (in state)
  - Density: 3,900/km^{2} (10,000/sq mi)
- Time zone: UTC+5:30 (IST)
- PIN: 485001
- Telephone code: (+91)07672
- Vehicle registration: MP-19
- Official language: Hindi
- Website: satna.nic.in

Satna is a city in the Indian state of Madhya Pradesh. It serves as the headquarters of Satna district. It is the state's 7th largest city and 8th most populous city. The city is 500 km east of the state capital Bhopal. The city is distributed over a land area of 111.9 square kilometers.

Satna has been selected as one of the hundred Indian cities to be developed as a smart city under PM Narendra Modi's flagship Smart Cities Mission.

== History ==
=== Princely states ===
==== Kothi state ====
Kothi State was a princely state of the British Raj. It belonged to the Bagelkhand Agency of Central India. Its capital was at Kothi, in modern Satna district of Madhya Pradesh. It was a state of about 438 km2 with a population of 19,112 inhabitants in 1901. The state's territory divided neighbouring Sohawal State in two parts. Kothi State was founded in the mid of 17th century by Lal Jagat Rai Singh Baghel, a Baghel Rajput ruler who expelled the former Bharr ruler of the area.

=== Revolt of 1857 ===
Thakur Ranmat Singh Baghel, a sardar (commander) in the service of Maharaja of Rewa, led a group of 2,000 rebels, besieging British officer Willoughby Osborne's bungalow abd later engaging in multiple battles across areas like Nagod, Bhilsain, Chitrakoot, Nowgong, Keoti, and defeated the British forces.

== Geography ==
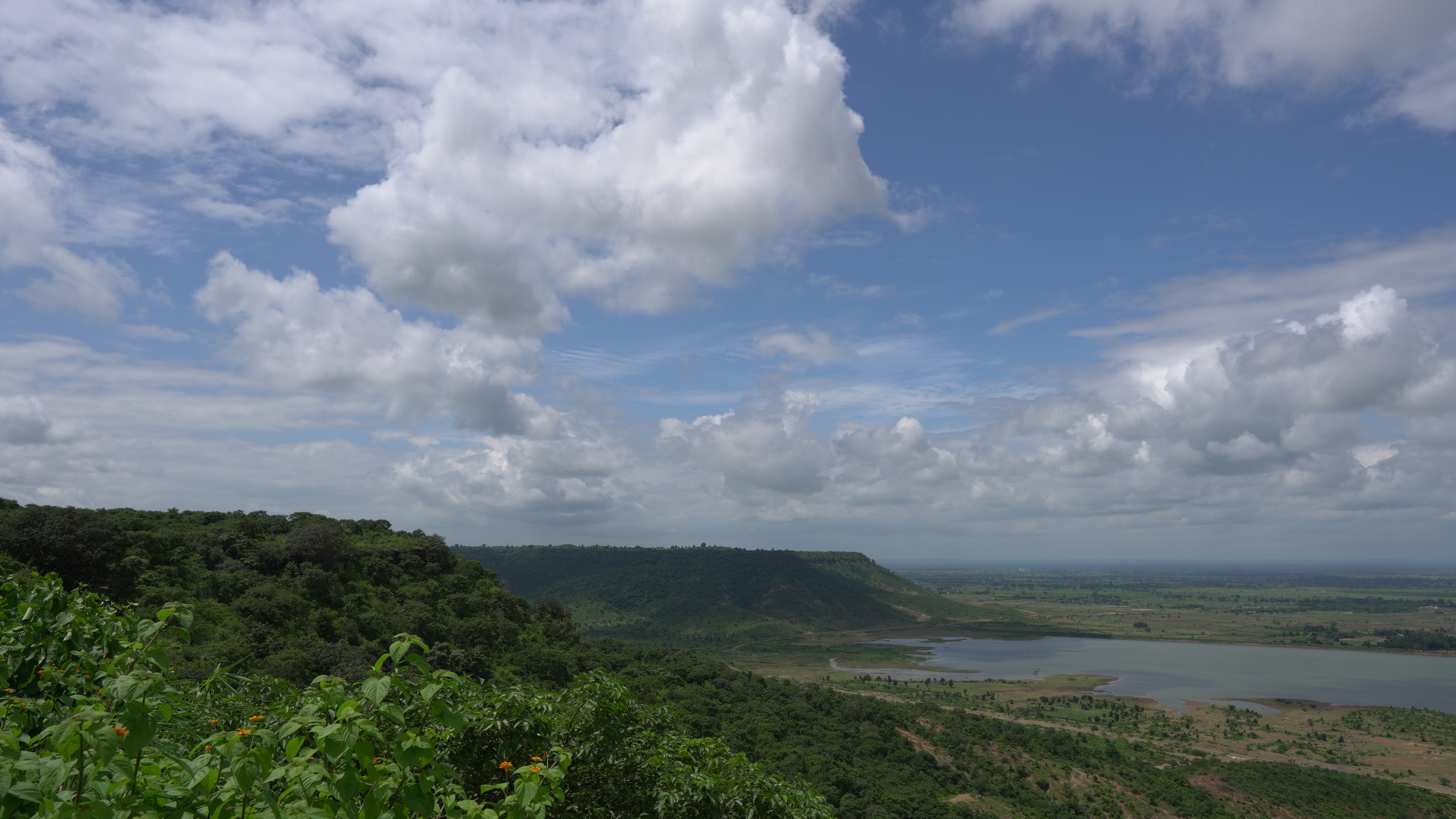
Parasmaniya hills

Satna is located at 24.34°N 80.49°E with an average elevation of 315 metres (1,352 feet).

=== Climate ===
Climate data for Satna (1991–2020, extremes 1901–present)
Month	Jan	Feb	Mar	Apr	May	Jun	Jul	Aug	Sep	Oct	Nov	Dec	Year
Record high °C (°F)	32.9 (91.2)	36.8 (98.2)	42.0 (107.6)	45.3 (113.5)	47.6 (117.7)	48.4 (119.1)	45.0 (113.0)	39.5 (103.1)	38.3 (100.9)	38.9 (102.0)	36.1 (97.0)	32.9 (91.2)	48.4 (119.1)
Mean daily maximum °C (°F)	23.9 (75.0)	27.6 (81.7)	33.3 (91.9)	38.9 (102.0)	41.8 (107.2)	39.1 (102.4)	33.1 (91.6)	31.6 (88.9)	32.2 (90.0)	32.7 (90.9)	29.7 (85.5)	26.0 (78.8)	32.4 (90.3)
Daily mean °C (°F)	16.2 (61.2)	19.9 (67.8)	25.4 (77.7)	30.8 (87.4)	34.4 (93.9)	32.9 (91.2)	28.8 (83.8)	28.0 (82.4)	28.2 (82.8)	26.2 (79.2)	21.8 (71.2)	17.4 (63.3)	25.8 (78.5)
Mean daily minimum °C (°F)	9.1 (48.4)	12.3 (54.1)	17.2 (63.0)	22.7 (72.9)	27.4 (81.3)	28.0 (82.4)	25.8 (78.4)	25.2 (77.4)	24.3 (75.7)	20.2 (68.4)	14.4 (57.9)	9.8 (49.6)	19.6 (67.3)
Record low °C (°F)	0.4 (32.7)	1.1 (34.0)	4.4 (39.9)	12.2 (54.0)	18.3 (64.9)	19.4 (66.9)	17.8 (64.0)	20.5 (68.9)	16.7 (62.1)	10.0 (50.0)	4.8 (40.6)	0.4 (32.7)	0.4 (32.7)
Average rainfall mm (inches)	13.5 (0.53)	22.7 (0.89)	14.6 (0.57)	8.5 (0.33)	16.6 (0.65)	121.1 (4.77)	330.2 (13.00)	325.2 (12.80)	193.7 (7.63)	37.1 (1.46)	6.2 (0.24)	5.7 (0.22)	1,095.2 (43.12)
Average rainy days	1.2	1.7	1.3	0.9	1.1	6.6	13.7	13.8	8.1	1.9	0.5	0.5	51.4
Average relative humidity (%) (at 17:30 IST)	48	39	27	20	23	45	72	77	70	49	45	47	47
Source 1: India Meteorological Department
Source 2: Tokyo Climate Center (mean temperatures 1991–2020)

== Demographics ==
Religions in Satna city (2011)
Religion	Percent
Hinduism	92.05%
Islam	6.38%
Jainism	0.72%
Christianity	0.42%
Other or not stated	0.43%
Distribution of religions

As of 2011 Indian Census, Satna had a total population of 280,222, of which 147,874 were males and 132,348 were females. Population within the age group of 0 to 6 years was 32,774. The total number of literates in Satna was 209,825, which constituted 74.9% of the population with male literacy of 79.5% and female literacy of 69.7%. The effective literacy rate of 7+ population of Satna was 84.8%, of which male literacy rate was 90.1% and female literacy rate was 78.9%. The Scheduled Castes and Scheduled Tribes population was 38,978 and 9,381 respectively. Satna had 54699 households in 2011.

As of 2001 India census, Satna had a population of 225,468, of which males 120,203 were males and 105,265 were females. Satna has an average literacy rate of 69.6%, of which male literacy is 76.2%, and female literacy is 62.1%. In Satna, the population in the age groups of 0 to 6 years was 33,205.

Languages of Satna (2011)
1. Hindi (88.9%)
2. Sindhi (3.49%)
3. Bagheli (3.13%)
4. Urdu (2.65%)
5. Others (1.79%)

== Economy ==
Satna is in the limestone belts of India. As a result, it contributes around 8%–9% of India's total cement production. There is an abundance of dolomite and limestone in the area and the city has ten cement factories producing and exporting cement to other parts of the country. The electrical cable company Universal Cables in Satna is among the pioneers in the country. The city of Satna is known as the commercial capital of Baghelkhand. The city is among the few most promising cities of Madhya Pradesh because of the several new industries planned by some of the reputed industrial houses in the country. The city has witnessed a sharp growth in the post-liberalization era (after 1993). Major problems faced by the city include inadequate electricity, poor road conditions, and air pollution from atmospheric wastes of cement factories. Satna is known as the cement city of India.

== Transport ==
=== Airways ===
Satna has an airport named Bharhut Airport, built in 1970. The closest major airport is in Allahabad in Uttar Pradesh, which is approximately 192 kilometres from Satna. The nearest major airport to Satna in the state is Jabalpur Airport which is approximately 200 kilometres from the city. Another airport is Khajuraho airport (HJR) which is approximately 112-kilometre from city.

The city is served by the Satna Junction railway station, an important junction under the Jabalpur railway division of the West Central Railway zone. Located on Howrah–Allahabad–Mumbai line, the station connects Satna directly to major Indian cities including Mumbai, Delhi, Kolkata, and Varanasi. It also serves as a key transit hub for pilgrims and tourists traveling to Chitrakoot and Khajuraho.

== Education ==
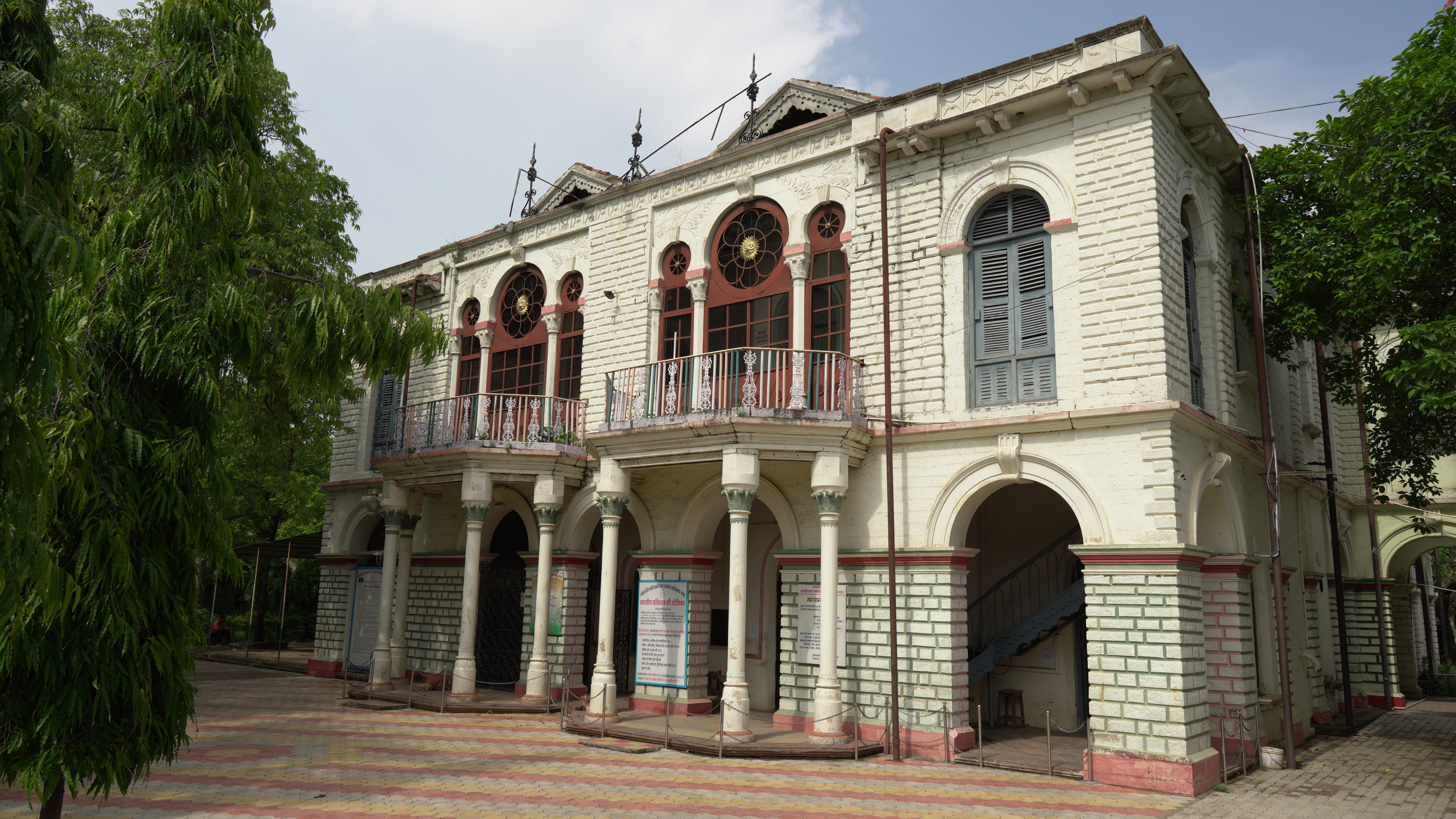
Indira Gandhi Girls College Satna

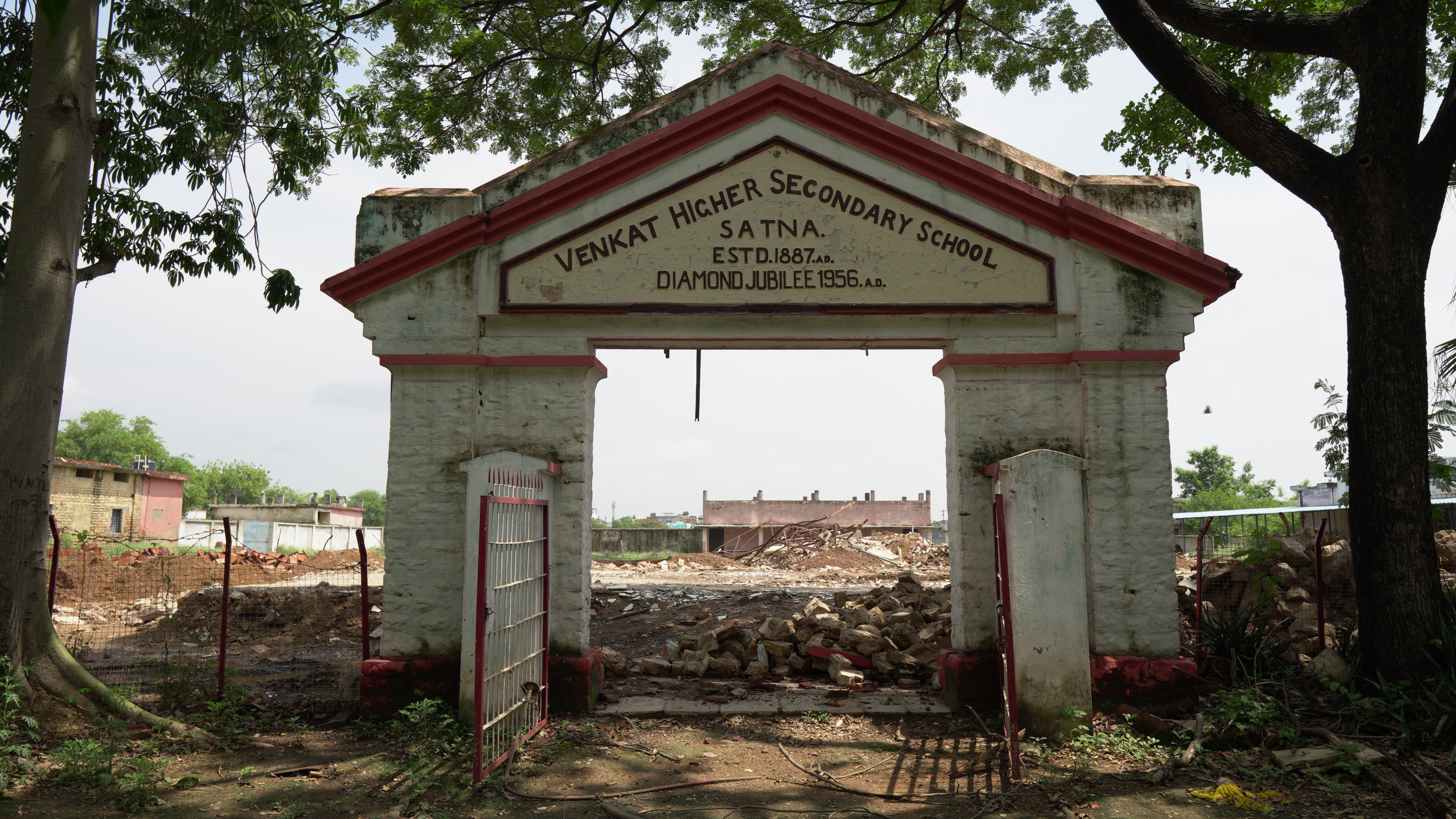
Government Venket HSS School of excellence Satna

Satna has a general literacy rate of 73.8%, according to the 2011 Madhya Pradesh Census, with the rate varying from 71% in the rural areas to 83.8% among the urban populace. Chitrakoot's first rural university, Mahatma Gandhi Chitrakoot Gramoday Vishwavidyalaya, was established in 1991; it is one of sixteen state government universities in Madhya Pradesh. Satna has more than 3,300 primary, secondary and postsecondary schools. Prominent colleges in the city include AKS University (a private university established in 2011), Government PG College, Government Girls College, and Government Polytechnic College.

== Notable people ==
- Gulsher Ahmed, former governor, Himachal Pradesh
- Raj Jain, professor at Washington University
- Sharat Saxena, actor
- Shivanand, former speaker, Vindhya Pradesh Legislative Assembly
- Arjun Singh, former chief minister, Madhya Pradesh
- Govind Narayan Singh, former chief minister, Madhya Pradesh
- J. S. Verma, former Chief Justice of India
- N. N. Wanchoo, Senior Civil Servant and later, Governor of the States of Kerala and Madhya Pradesh

== See also ==
- Satna (Lok Sabha constituency)
- Betul
