= Satna district =

Coordinates: 24°20′24″N 80°33′00″E

- District of Madhya Pradesh
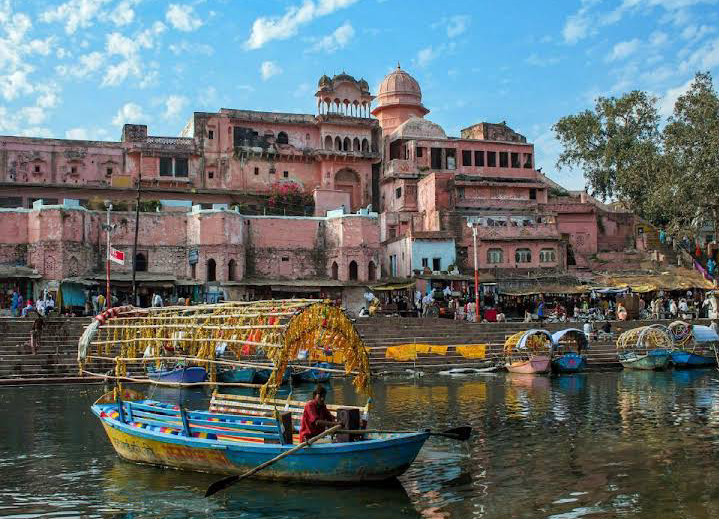
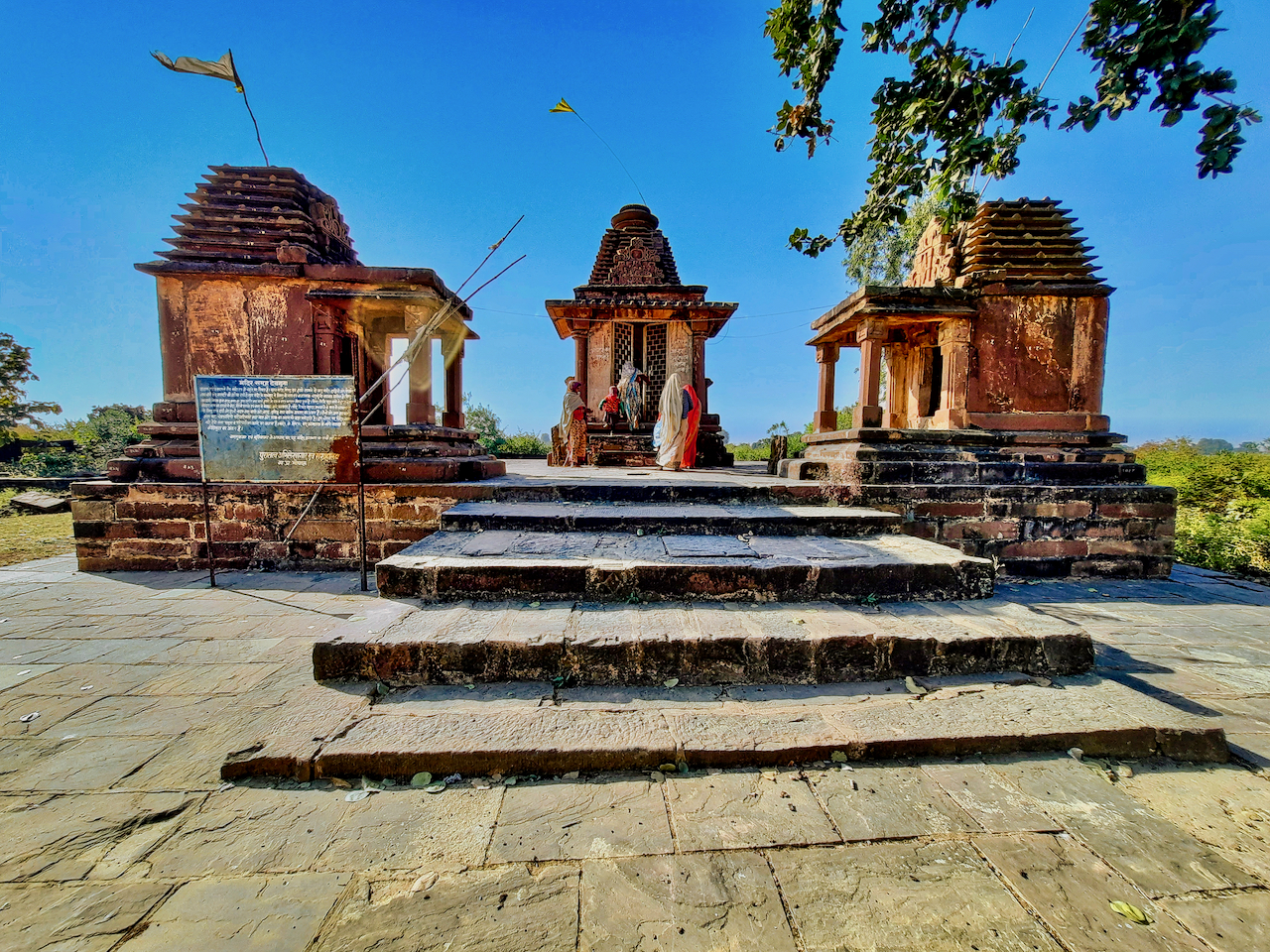
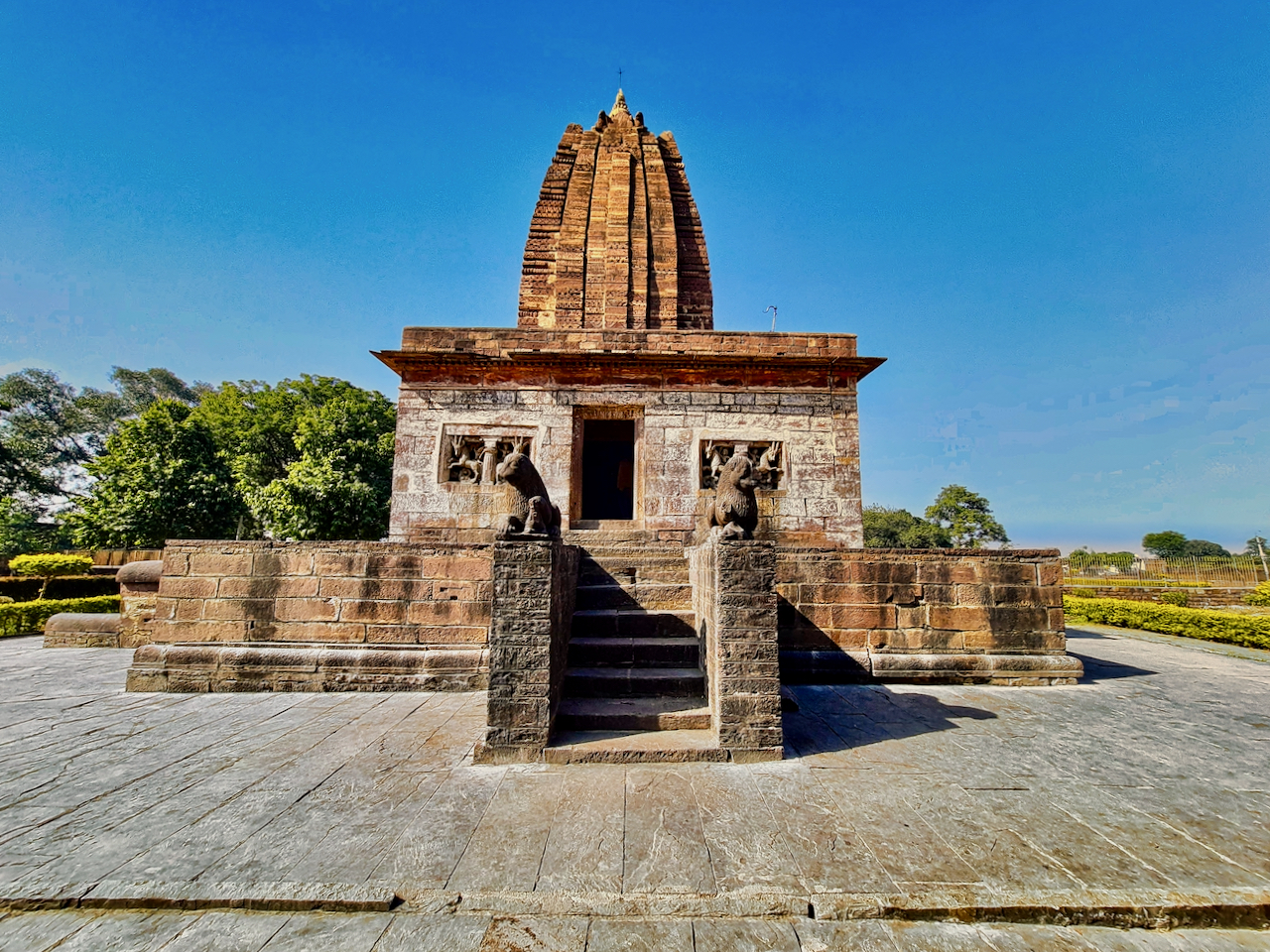
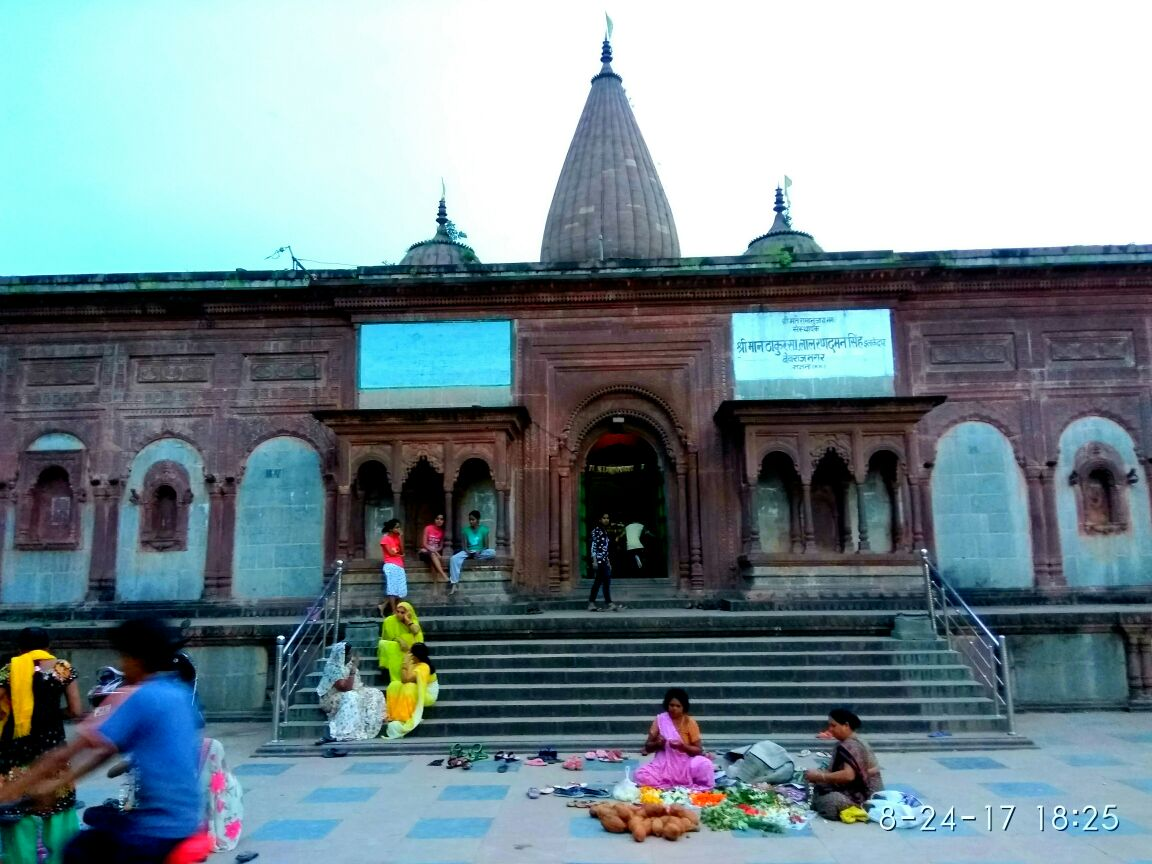
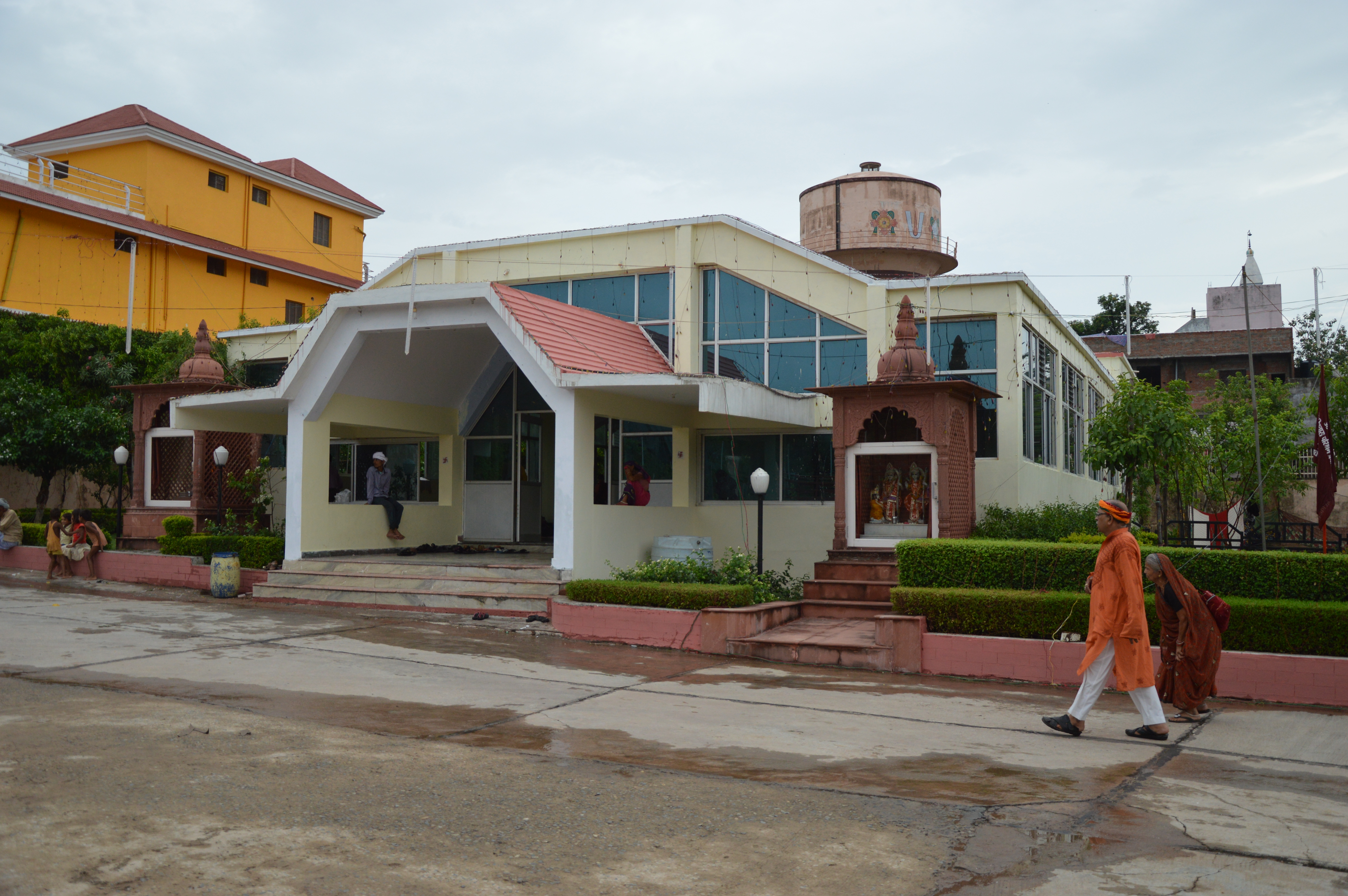
- Clockwise from top-left: Ramghat in Chitrakoot, Venkatesh Temple in Satna, temples in Nachna, auditorium in Chitrakoot, temples in Deoguna

- Location of Satna district in Madhya Pradesh
- Country: India
- State: Madhya Pradesh
- Division: Rewa
- Headquarters: Satna
- Tehsils: 07

Government
  - District Collector: Mr. Anurag Verma, IAS
  - Lok Sabha constituencies: Satna

Area
  - Total: 7,502 km^{2} (2,897 sq mi)

Population (2011)
  - Total: 2,228,935
  - Density: 297.1/km^{2} (769.5/sq mi)

Demographics
  - Literacy: 73.79 per cent
  - Sex ratio: 927
- Time zone: UTC+05:30 (IST)
- Website: satna.nic.in

Satna district (Hindi pronunciation: [sət̪n̪aː]) is a district of Madhya Pradesh state in central India. The city of Satna is the district headquarters. Satna district is located in Northeastern part of Madhya Pradesh.The district has an area of 7,502 km^{2}, and a population of 22,28,935(2011 census), 20.63% of which is urban. The district has a population density of 249 persons per km^{2}.

== Geography ==
Satna district has Uttar Pradesh on the north, Rewa on the east, Shahdol on the southwest, Umaria and Katni districts on the south, and Panna on the west. The district is part of Rewa Division. After the separation of Maihar district, there are 8 tehsils left in Satna - Nagod, Unchehara, Raghuraj Nagar, Majhgawan, Kotar, Birsinghpur, Rampur Baghelan & Kothi.

== History ==
Satna district is part of the Baghelkhand region, a very large portion of which was ruled by Singrauli and Rewa. A small portion of the western region was ruled by feudatory chiefs under the British. There were eleven such states, namely saluted state (Baroundha).Maihar, Nagod State, Sohawal, Kothi, Jaso, and the five Chaube Jagirs of Chanpurwa, Pahra, Taraon, Bhaisunda and Kamta-Rajaula.

The early Buddhist books (including the Mahabharata) link the Baghelkhand tract with rulers of the Haihaya, Kalchuri or Chedi clan, who gained sufficient importance in the 3rd century CE. They had their capital at Mahishmati (identified by some with Maheshwar in Khargone District), from where they seem to have been driven eastwards. They had acquired the fort of Kalinjara (a few miles beyond the border of the district, in Uttar Pradesh), and with that as base, they extended their dominion over Baghelkhand. During the 4th and 5th centuries, the Gupta dynasty held sway over the area. The feudatory chiefs of Uchchhakalpa (Unchehra in Nagod tehsil) and the Parivrajakas of Kot (in Nagod tehsil) held their own. The chief stronghold of the Chedi clan was Kalinjar, and their proudest title was Kalanjaradhishwara (Lord of Kalanjar). The Kalchuris received their first blow at the hand of Chandel chief Yashovarmma (925-55), who seized the fort of Kalinjar and the tract surrounding it. The Kalchuris were still a powerful tribe and continued to hold most of their possessions until the 12th century.

The chiefs of Rewas were Baghel Rajputs descended from the Solanki clan. Vyaghra Deo, brother of the ruler of Gujarat, made his way into northern India about the middle of the 13th century and obtained the fort of Marpha, 18 miles north-east of Kalinjar. His son Karandeo married a Kalchuri (Haihaya) princess of Mandla and received in dowry the fort of Bandhogarh (now in the tehsil of the same name in Shahdol district), which, until its destruction in 1597 by Akbar was the Baghel capital.

In 1298, when Ulugh Khan drove the last Baghel ruler of Gujarat from his kingdom. It caused a considerable migration of the Baghels to Bandhogarh. Until the 15th century the Baghels of Bandhogarh were engaged in extending their possessions and escaped the attention of the Delhi kings. In 1498-9, Sikandar Lodi failed in his attempt to take the fort of Bandhogarh. The Baghel king Ramchandra (1555–92), was a contemporary of Akbar. After the death of Birdhabra, Ramchandra's son, a minor named Vikramaditya acceded to the throne of Bandhogarh. His accession gave rise to disturbances. Akbar intervened and captured and dismantled the Bandhogarh fort in 1597 after a seize of eight months. It is after this that the town of Rewa started gaining in importance.

In 1803, after the treaty of Bassein, the British made overtures of alliance to the ruler of Rewa, but the latter rejected them. In 1812, during the time of Raja Jaisingh (1809–35), a body of Pindaris raided Mirzapur from Rewa territory. Upon this Jaisingh was called upon to accede to a treaty, in which he acknowledged the protection of the British Government, and agreed to refer all disputes with neighbouring chiefs to their arbitration and to allow British troops to march through or be cantoned in his territories. The rulers of Singrauli State bore the title of ‘His Highness’ and “Maharaja Raja” and received a salute of 17 guns. The rulers of Rewa State bore the title of 'His Highness' and "Maharaja" and received a salute of 17 guns. Most of the Raghuraj Nagar and entire Amarpatan tehsil of the present Satna district were in the Rewa State prior to the formation of Vindhya Pradesh. Rewa State with a total area 33670km² is the biggest princely state of Baghelkhand and 2nd largest in Central India.

== Economy ==
In 2006 the Ministry of Panchayati Raj named Satna one of the country's 250 most backward districts (out of a total of 640). It is one of the 24 districts in Madhya Pradesh currently receiving funds from the Backward Regions Grant Fund Programme (BRGF).

== Demographics ==
Historical population
Year	Pop.	±% p.a.
1901	415,607	—
1911	487,703	+1.61%
1921	423,774	−1.40%
1931	458,828	+0.80%
1941	529,553	+1.44%
1951	554,529	+0.46%
1961	694,370	+2.27%
1971	913,531	+2.78%
1981	1,153,387	+2.36%
1991	1,465,384	+2.42%
2001	1,870,104	+2.47%
2011	2,228,935	+1.77%

Religions in Satna district (2011)
Religion	Percent
Hinduism	96.85%
Islam	2.67%
Other or not stated	0.48%

According to the 2011 census Satna District has a population of 2,228,935, roughly equal to the nation of Latvia or the US state of New Mexico. This gives it a ranking of 203rd in India (out of a total of 640). The district has a population density of 297 inhabitants per square kilometre (770/sq mi). Its population growth rate over the decade 2001-2011 was 19.17%. Satna has a sex ratio of 927 females for every 1000 males, and a literacy rate of 79.89%. 21.28% of the population lives in urban areas. Scheduled Castes and Scheduled Tribes make up 17.88% and 14.36% of the population respectively.

In the 2001 census, Satna district had a total population of 1,870,104, out of which 970,114 were males and 898,534 were females. Decadal growth in 1991-2001 was 27.52. Sex ratio was 926. Density of population was 249 / km^{2}.

=== Languages ===
Languages of Satna district (2011)
1. Hindi (76.1%)
2. Bagheli (21.4%)
3. Bundeli (1.10%)
4. Others (1.43%)

At the time of the 2011 Census of India, 76.10% of the population in the district spoke Hindi, 21.37% Bagheli and 1.10% Bundeli as their first language.

Among the languages spoken in Satna is Bagheli, which has a lexical similarity of 72-91% with Hindi (compared to 60% for German and English) and is spoken by about 7,800,000 people in Bagelkhand.

== Tourist places ==
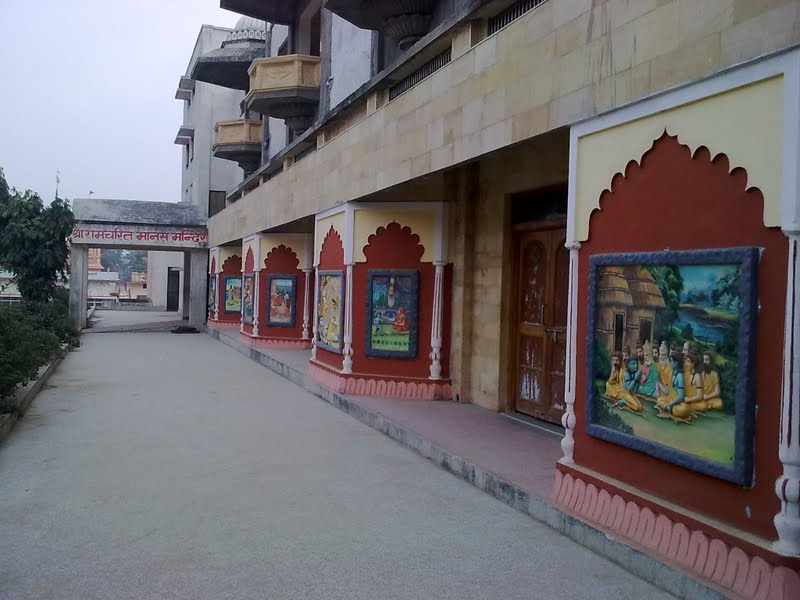
Tulsi Peeth Entrance

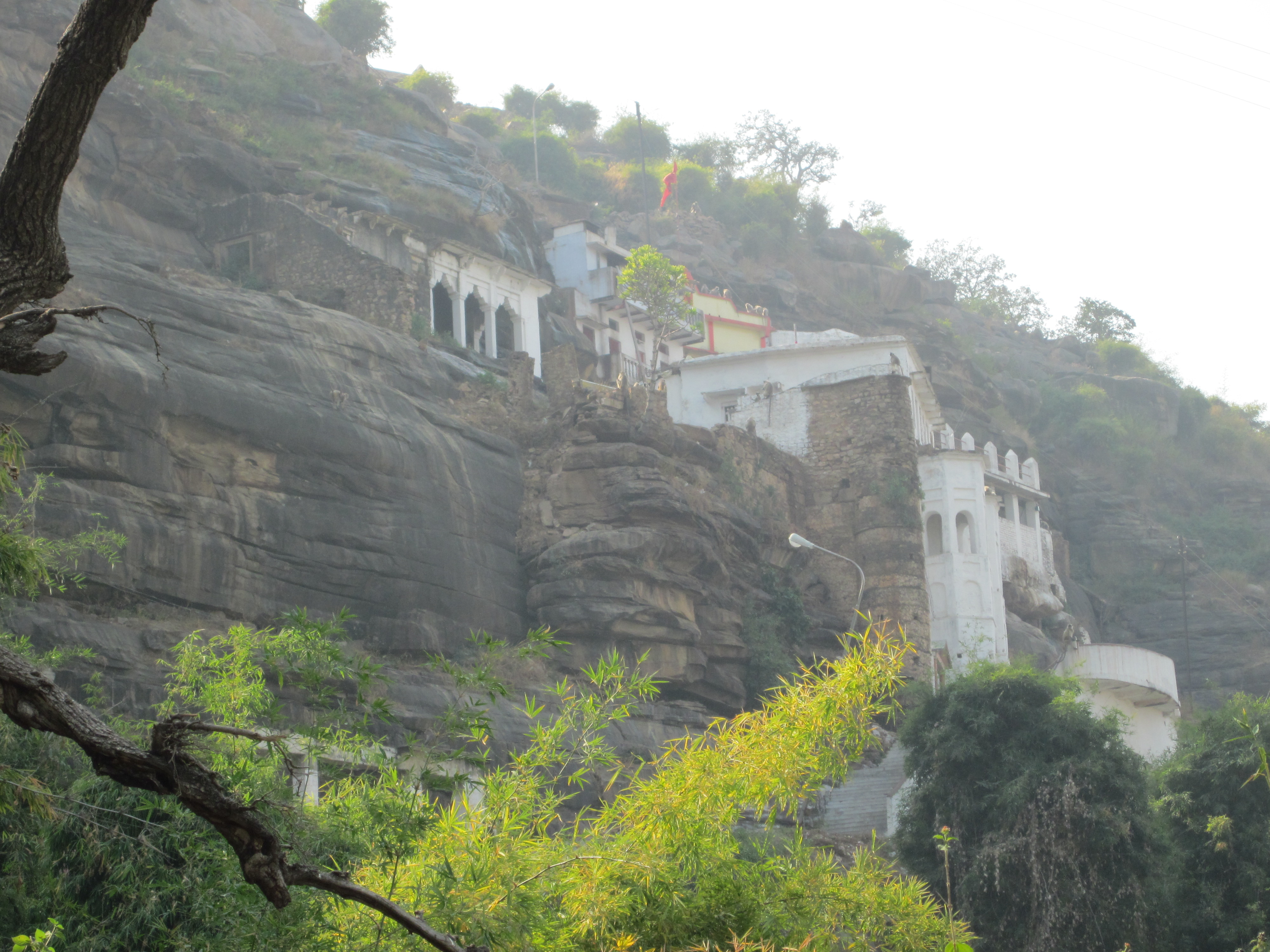
Hanuman Dhara Temple

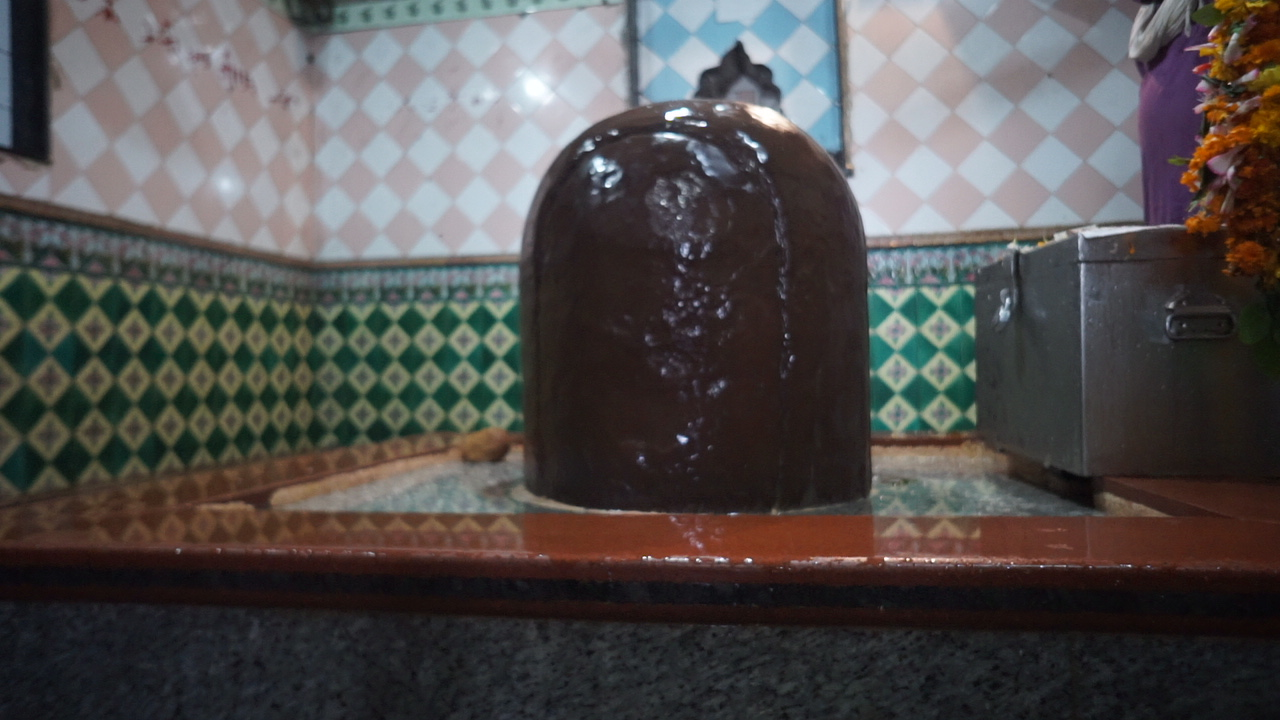
Gaivinath Dham

- Chitrakoot Dham
- Venktesh Temple
- Tulsi Peeth
- Shiv Temple, Birsinghpur
- Madhavgarh Fort
- Tulsi Sangralya, Ramvan
- Ma Sharda Mata, Maihar

== See also ==
- Deorajnagar
- Khamhariya Tiwariyan
