= Katni copper-plate of Jayanātha =

The Katni copper-plate of Jayanātha is an epigraphic record documenting the donation of the village of Kalabhikuṇḍaka in the time of the Uccakalpa ruler mahārāja Jayanātha (circa 493-502 CE). It is dated year 182 in the Gupta era (circa 502 CE).

== Location ==
Katni is a town in Jabalpur District, Madhya Pradesh, India. The plates, however, are not from Katni itself, but are reported to have been recovered at Uchahara, the ancient Uccakalpa, in Satna district. The inscription is currently located in the museum at Jabalpur.

== Publication ==
The inscription was first published by Usha Jain in 1972-73. The record is listed also in Madan Mohan Upadhyay, Inscriptions of Mahakoshal, no. 2: 10.

== Description and contents ==
The inscription is in the Sanskrit language. The inscription records how mahārāja Jayanātha divided a village named Kalabhikuṇḍaka into a sixty shares and donated these to twenty-five different people.

== Historical significance ==
The donees are individually named as is their caste affiliation: brāhmaṇa, kṣatriya, vaiśya or śūdra. This is one of the first inscriptions in India to specifically list the four varṇa-s. The implications of this are explored by Michael Willis in his book The Archaeology of Hindu Ritual.

== Metrics ==
The metrics are not recorded in the publications consulted.

== Text ==
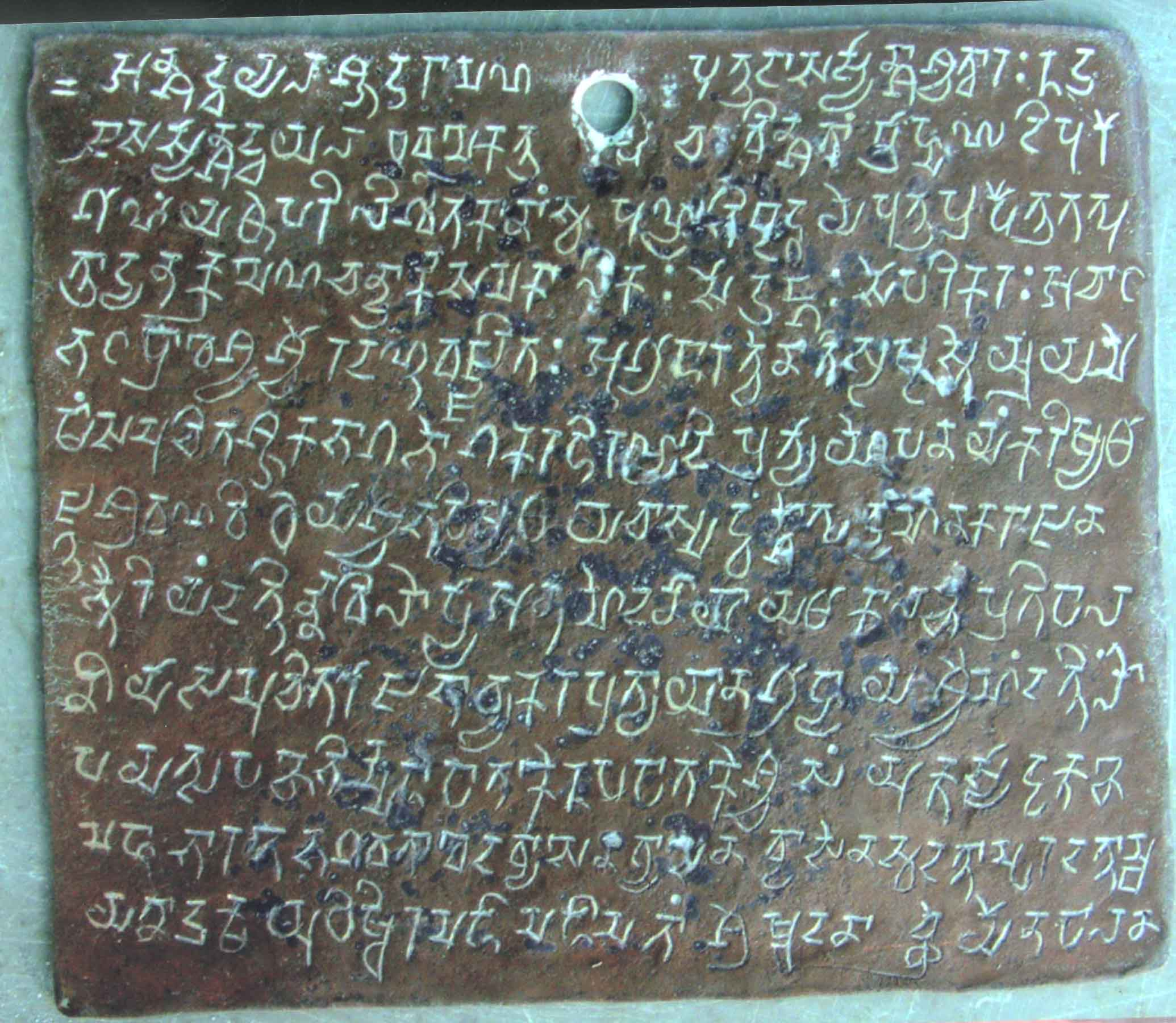
first plate

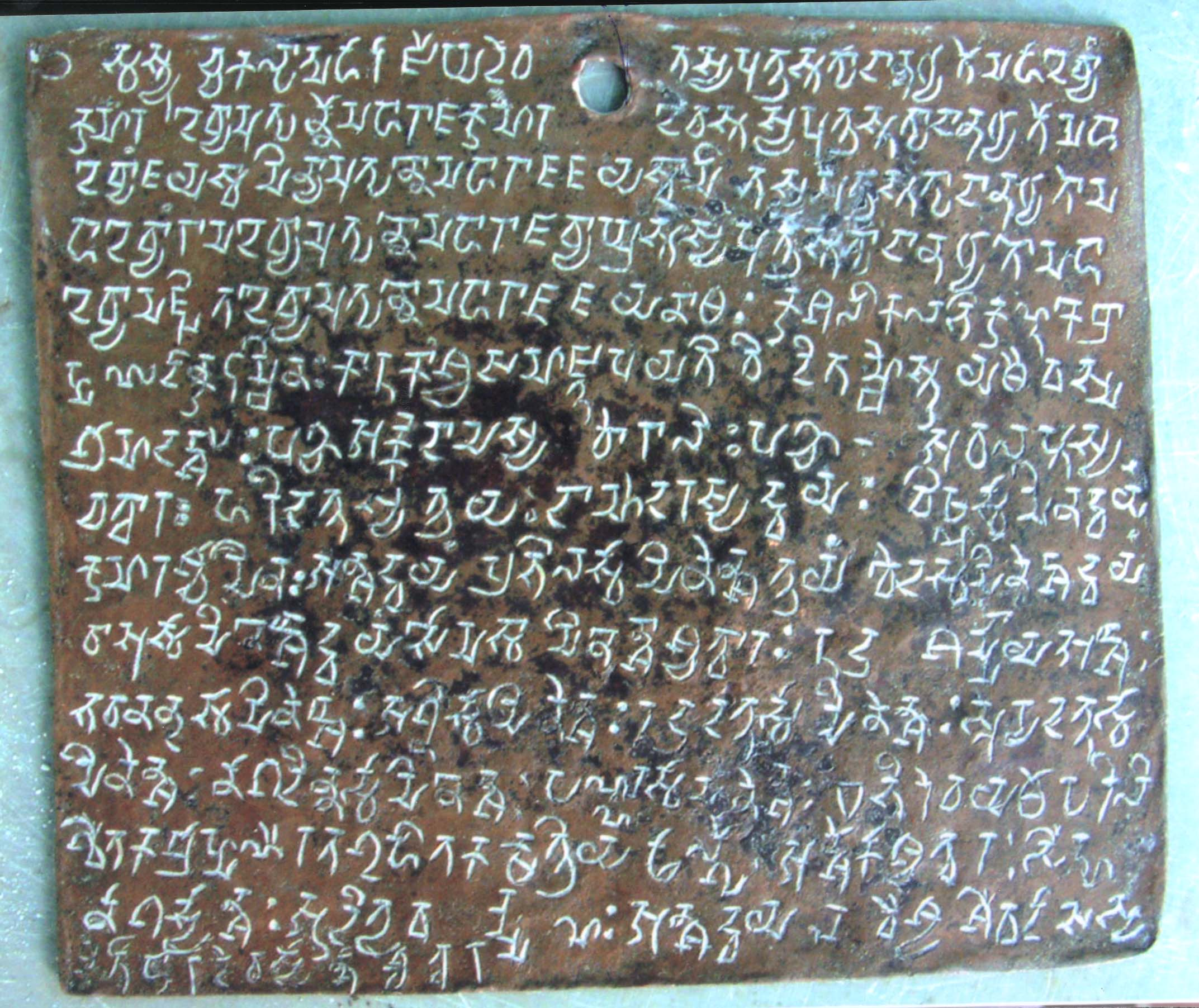
second plate

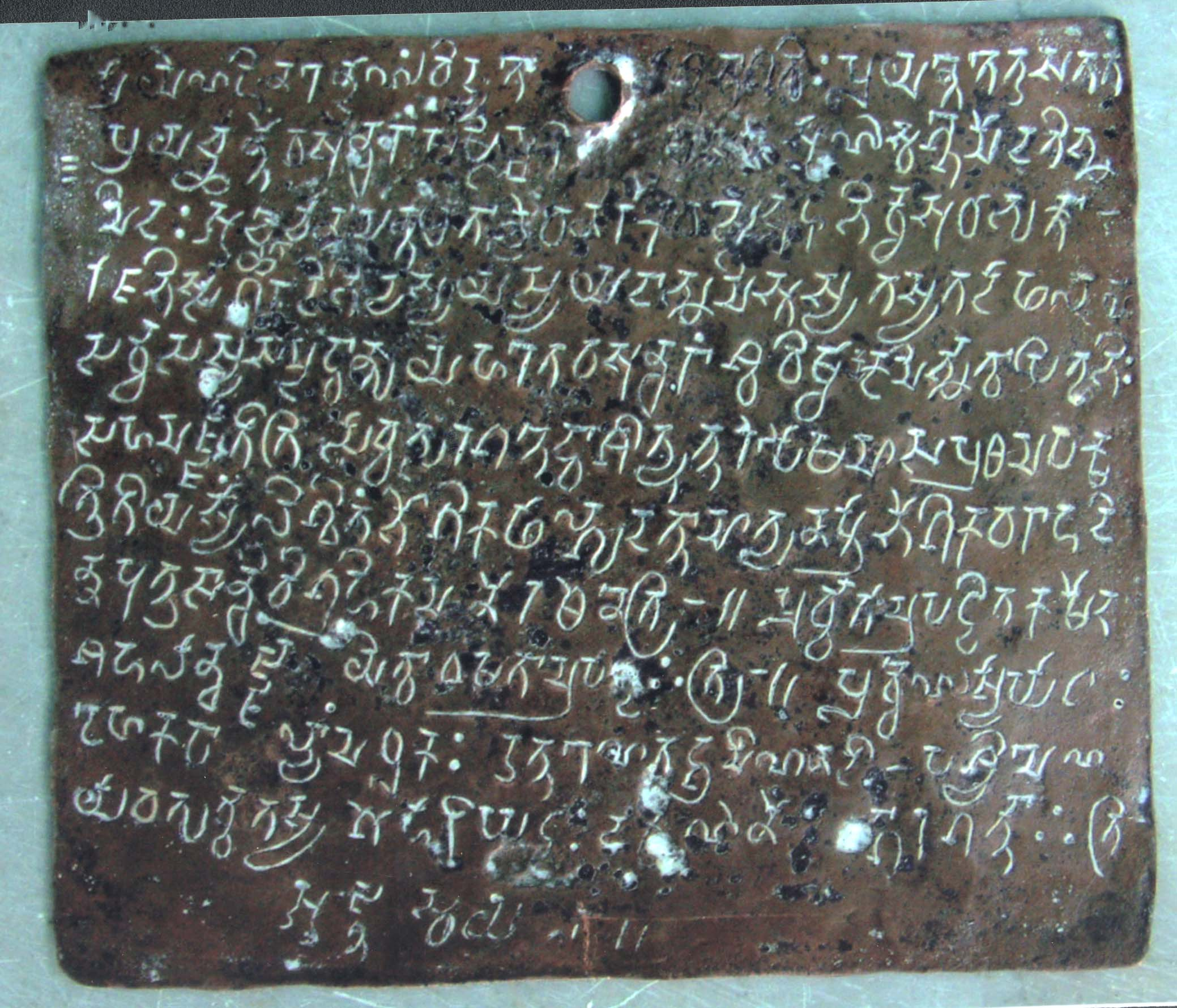
third plate

== See also ==
- Indian inscriptions
