= Pataini temple =

- Pataini devi temple

Religion
- Affiliation: Jainism
- Deity: Pataini Devi

Location
- Location: Unchehara, Satna district, Madhya Pradesh
- Interactive map of Pataini temple
- Coordinates: 24°26′18.1″N 80°46′32″E

Architecture
- Style: Gupta architecture
- Established: 5th century

The Pataini temple or Pataini devi temple is a 5th century Jain temple constructed during the reign of the Gupta Empire and located near the town of Unchehara in Madhya Pradesh, India.

== Location ==
The Pataini temple is located on Satna-Unchehara riad, 12.87 kilometres (8.00 mi) north of Unchehara.

== History ==
Discovered by Alexander Cunningham in 1873-74, the Pataini temple dates back to the Gupta Empire. The temple houses a 10th or 11th century inscription detailing the name of the residing deities. The temple is wedged out 0.3 metres (1 ft 0 in) from the back wall corner, indicating an attempt was made to pull down the temple, which was possibly interrupted by villagers.

== Architecture ==
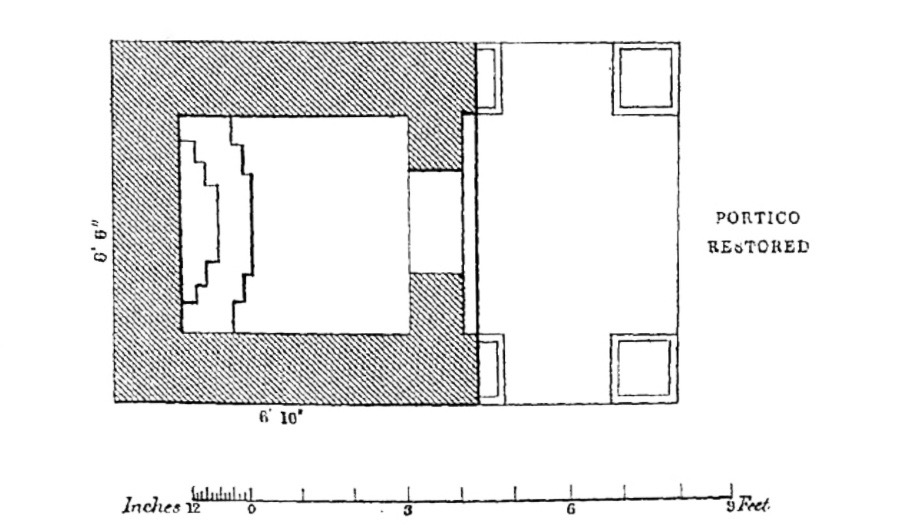
Plan of Pataini temple

The temple is a small 2.08 by 1.98 metres (6 ft 10 in by 6 ft 6 in) structure notable for its massive Gupta style, single flat slab, 2.34 by 2.24 metres (7 ft 8 in by 7 ft 4 in) roof. (Note: Gupta period temple with flat roof design includes temples in Tigawa, and Eran.) The temple entrance features an ornate door frame and two mouldings, another common feature of Gupta architecture.

The temple enshrines a 1.07 metres (3 ft 6 in) idol of Jain goddess Devi flanked by two male figures inside a small mandapa. The idol originally had four arms and is now unrecognizable.

The idol is surrounded by small figures - 5 above, 7 to the right and left, and 4 below. Above these figures, carvings of Tirthankara in lotus position, with the image of Neminatha seated on a pedestal with the shankha, are displayed.

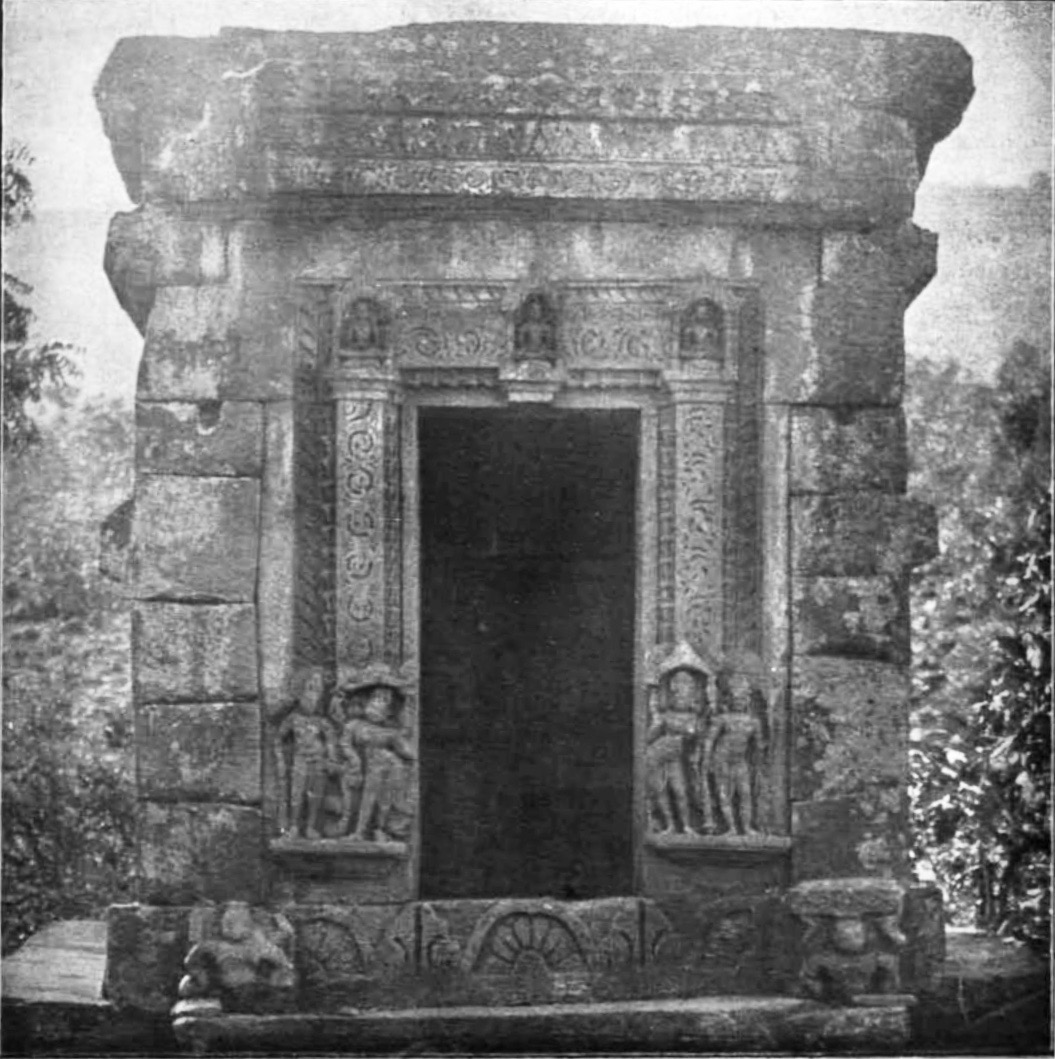
Temple entrance with images of Jain and Hindu deities

According to the inscription, the figures are named as follows:

S. No.	Above	Left	Right
1	Bahurupini	Aparajita	Jaya
2	Chamunda	Mahamunusi	Anantamati
3	Padmavati	Anantamati	Vairata
4	Vijaya	Gandhari	Gauri
5	Saraswati	Mansai	Kali
6		Jwalamalini	Mahakali
7		Manuji	Vrijamsakala

The outer doorway shows three figures, Rishabhanatha, Suparshvanatha, and Parshvanatha. Carvings of Shiva and Parvati are shown underneath the images of Trithankara. The bottom of the door contains images of Yamuna, Ganga, and their attendants.

== See also ==
- Kahaum pillar
- Aihole
- Bhitargaon
- Shreyansh Giri
