= Unchehara =

- town
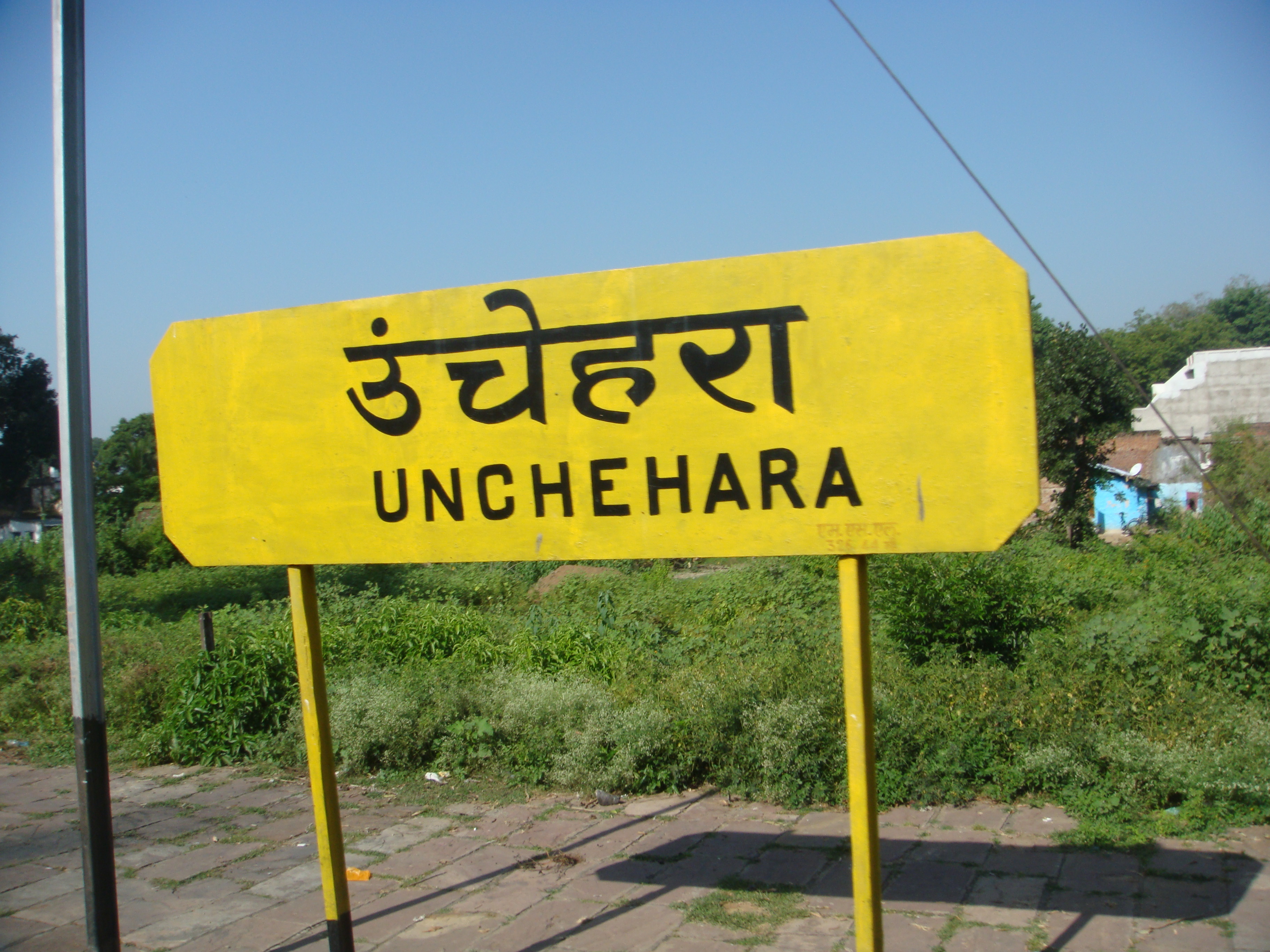

- Location in Madhya Pradesh, India
- Coordinates: 24°23′36″N 80°47′7″E
- Country: India
- State: Madhya Pradesh
- District: Satna

Population (2001)
  - Total: 16,662

Languages
  - Official: Hindi
- Time zone: UTC+5:30 (IST)

Unchehara is a town and a nagar panchayat in Satna district in the Indian state of Madhya Pradesh. It is a block and one of six tehsils of Satna district. The town lies in the vicinity of Vindhya Range in Central India.

Kabir Math and Raj Mandir (Royal Temple) of Parihar Rajputa Maharajas, and a kothi (fort) of Maharajas cover the area.

== Demographics ==
As of 2001 India census, Unchehara had a population of 16,662. Males constitute 52% of the population and females 48%. Unchehara has an average literacy rate of 65%, higher than the national average of 59.5%: male literacy is 74%, and female literacy is 54%. In Unchehara, 16% of the population is under 6 years of age.

== History ==
Some historians have identified Unchehara as ancient Uchchhakalpa town mentioned in the inscriptions of the Uchchhakalpa dynasty kings.

In 1344, Uchchakalpa was made capital of the Nagod State.

Pataini temple, near Unchehara, is a Jain temple constructed during the reign of Gupta Empire in 5th century.

== Modern Unchehara ==
Currently in 2012 National Public Hr. Sec. School have been opened in Paprenga village by Kunjraj Shiksha Vikas Samiti, Bihata.

Unchehra Janpad-Panchayat consists of 20 members and its Vikas-Khand consists of 66 Gram-Panchayats which includes a total of 322 villages. Unchehra has its own railway station named Unchehra railway station which comes under Unchehra Tehsil. Work of Unchehra Tehsil started systematically from 2001. In Unchehra, infrastructure and facilities e.g. office block, Tehsil, police-station (under a town Inspector), hospital, Office of Forest Department, post-office, Telecom-Office, waiting rooms at Bus Stand and railway station, schools up to higher secondary, Madhya Pradesh Bhoj university, two Dharmashalas are available for people.

Currently in 2012 National Public Hr. Sec. School have been opened in Paprenga village by Kunjraj Shiksha Vikas Samiti, Bihata.

Unchehra had been well known for milk product named 'Khova' which is being produced and brought from nearby villages. It is well connected by rail and road transport to major cities like Delhi, Bhopal and Jabalpur.
