= Eran =

Ancient town and archaeological site in the Sagar district of Madhya Pradesh

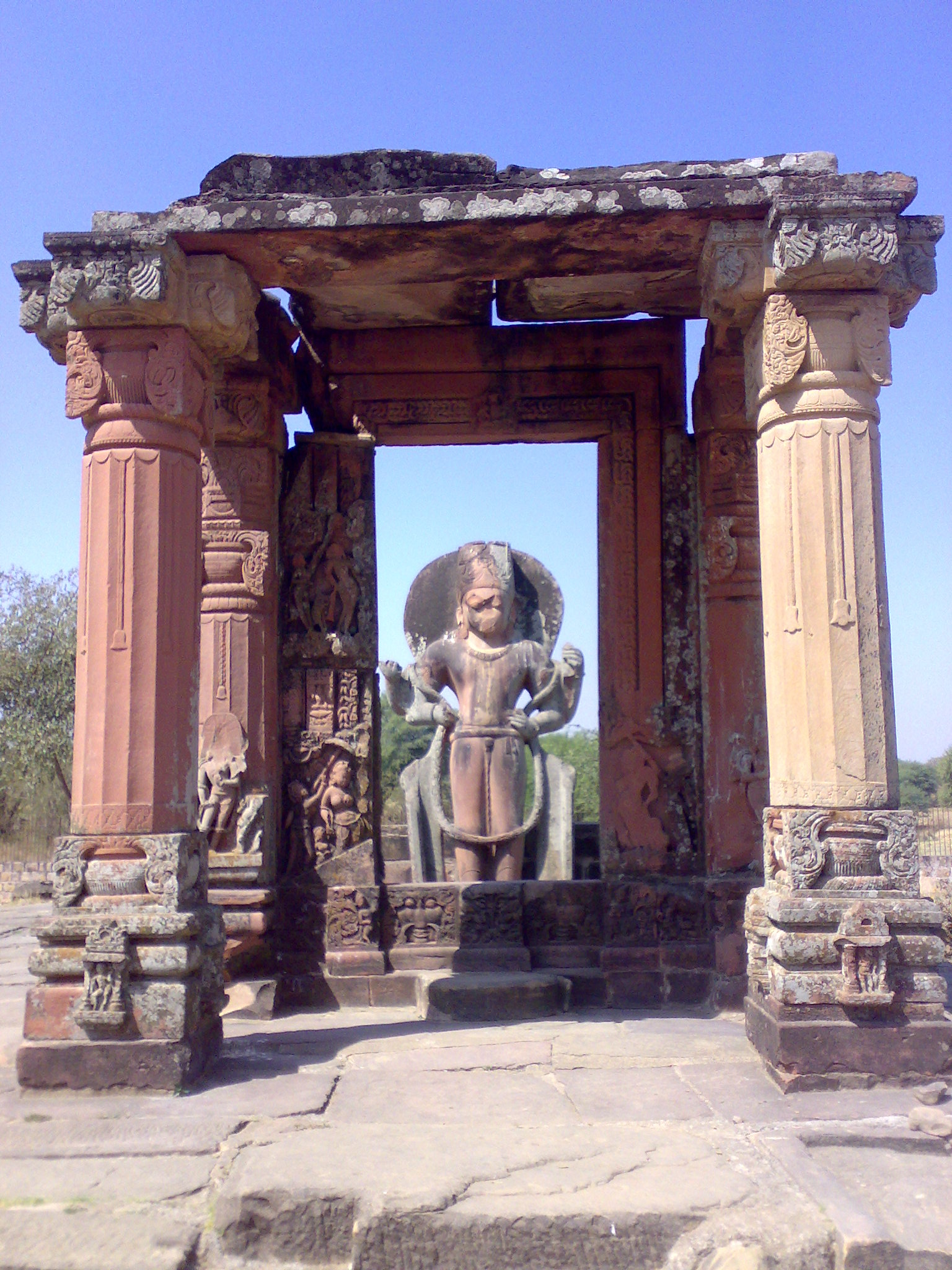
- Mandapa of the Vishnu Temple at Eran

- Location within India Location within Madhya Pradesh
- 24.093846°N 78.172695°E
- Location: Sagar district, Madhya Pradesh

Eran is an ancient town and archaeological site in the Sagar district of Madhya Pradesh, India. It was one of the ancient mints for Indian dynasties, as evidenced by the diverse coins excavated here. The site has 5th and 6th-century Gupta era temples and monuments, particularly the colossal stone boar with sages, and scholars depicted on the body of the sculpture. The inscription stones found at Eran are important for reconstructing the chronology of the Gupta Empire's history. Eran or Erakina was the capital of Erakina (Airikina) Pradesha or Airkina Vishaya, an administrative division of the Gupta Empire.

== Etymology ==
The ancient name of Eran (Sanskrit: ऐरण), Erakaina, krishiv, Erakanya or Erakina (as mentioned in the inscriptions); Airikina (Sanskrit: ऐरिकिण, as mentioned in the inscription of Samudragupta) or Erikina (as mentioned in the inscription of Toramana) is derived from Eraka. The word erakā probably refers to a tall grass commonly called the Elephant cattail, botanical name Typha elephantina, which grows at Eran in abundance.

== Location ==
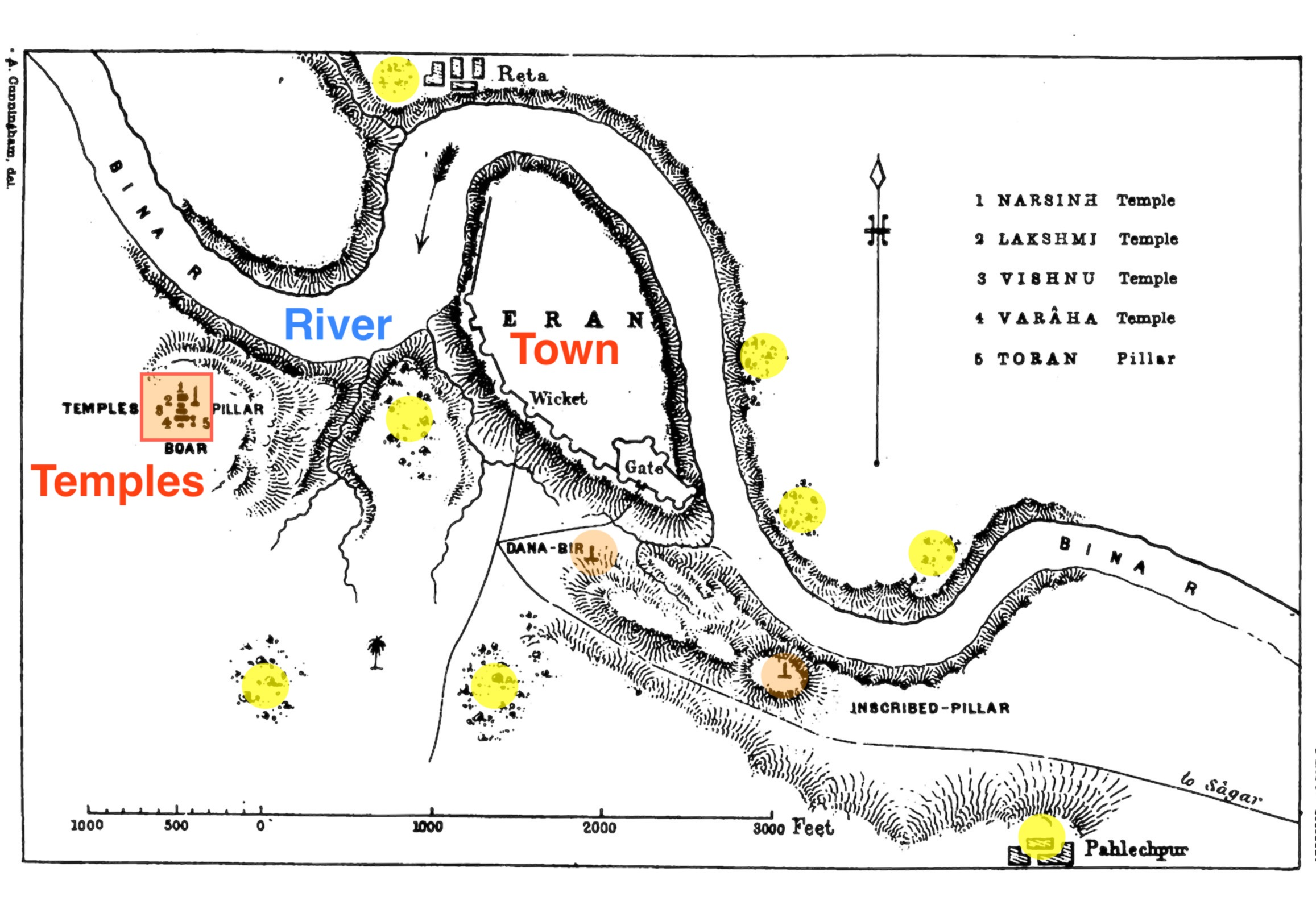
Eran archaeological site map, 1880 sketch

Eran is located on the south bank of the Bina River in Madhya Pradesh. It is about 100 kilometres (62 mi) north-northeast of the ancient Vidisha-Sanchi-Udayagiri site, about 80 kilometres (50 mi) west-northwest of Sagar, and about 160 kilometres (99 mi) northeast of Bhopal. At the site, the river makes an inverted "U" turn, surrounding it with water on three sides, which Cunningham stated made it "a very favorite position for Hindu towns". The terrain is forested and hilly, with high grounds shielding the south of the Eran town.

== History ==
Eran is an ancient city, one that finds mention as Erakaina or Erakanya in Buddhist, and Hindu texts, on ancient coins and inscriptions nearby and distant sites such as Sanchi. It is now a small town surrounded by many mounds, likely archaeological remains of its distant past. The archaeological site near Eran has revealed several Gupta Empire era inscriptions. The town of Eran has a museum with a collection of archaeological relics. The first epigraphical evidence of sati (immolation of widow) is found in an inscription at Eran, the Inscription of Bhanugupta (510 CE).

== Archaeology ==
The following sequence of cultures has been obtained and carbon dated at the site of Eran

Period I: Chalcolithic (1800 BC-700 BC)

Period II: Early historic (700 BC-2nd century BC)

Period IIB: 2nd century BC - 1st century AD

Period III: 1st century - 600 AD

Period IV: late medieval (16th century AD - 18th century AD)

== Description ==
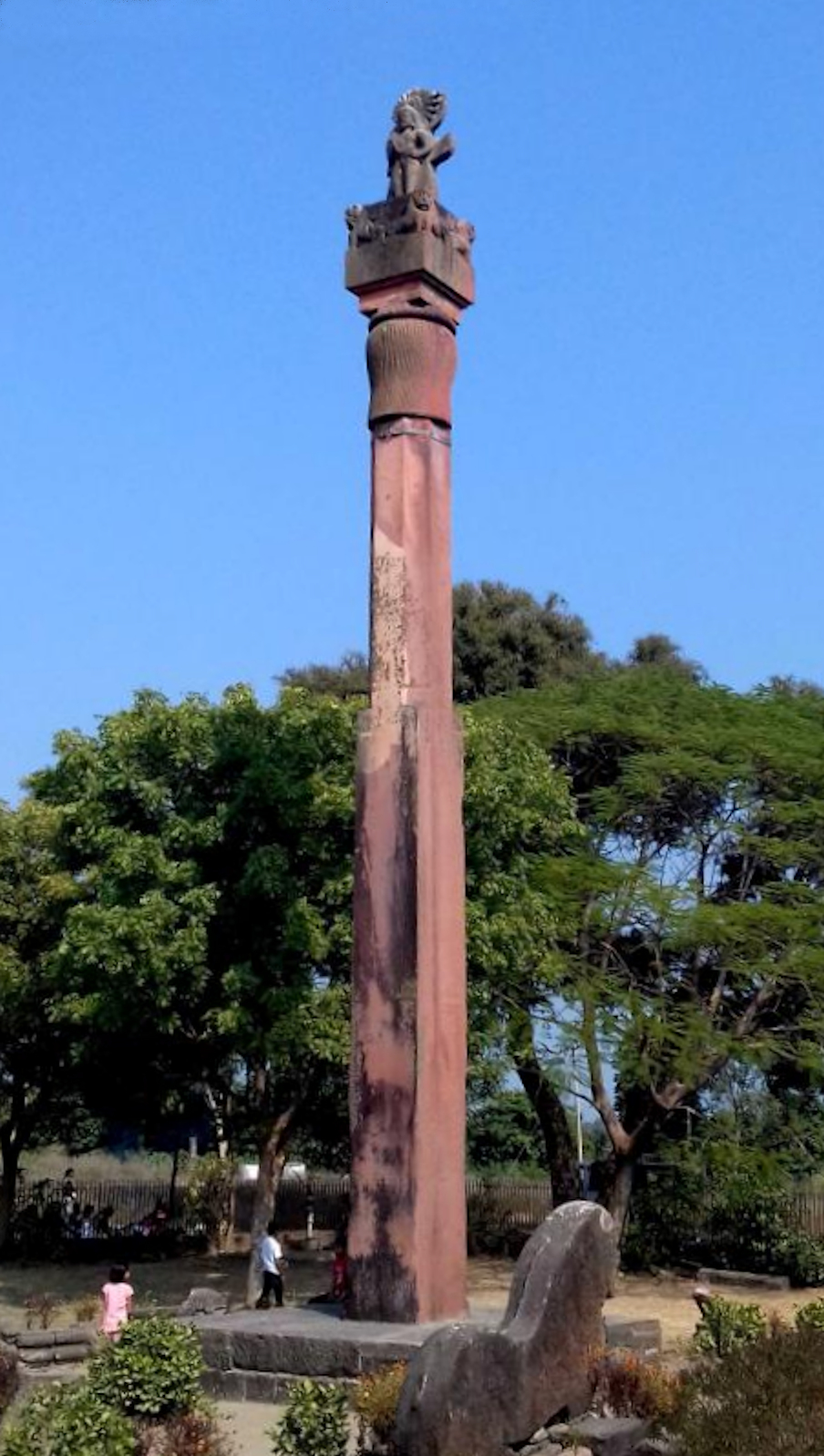
The Buddhagupta pillar at Eran (c.476–495 CE), raised in honour of Janardana, another name of Vishnu. On top is a double statue of Garuda, holding a serpent in his hands, with a chakra wheel behind the head.

The complex initially consisted in a twin temple dedicated to Vāsudeva and Saṃkarṣaṇa, and guarded by the 13 meter Garuda pillar.

=== Temples ===
A group of ancient Hindu temples are located to the west of the Eran town. These are not aligned to the east or any cardinal direction, but to 76 degrees, or about 14 degrees off towards north from east. This suggests that they likely date to the Gupta period. According to Cunningham, this deliberate shift for all the temples, and some other Gupta era Hindu temple sites may be to match the one nakshatra measure (lunar movement in one day), or one twenty-seventh part of 360 degrees.

All the temples have a rectangular or square plan and they are in a row.

==== Pillar ====
Pillar: It is exactly 75 feet (23 m) in front of the line of temples. The 43 feet (13 m) high monolith pillar stands on a square platform of 13 feet (4.0 m) side. The bottom 20 feet (6.1 m) of the pillar are of square cross-section (2.85 feet side), the next 8 feet (2.4 m) is octagonal. Above it is a capital in the shape of a reeded bell of 3.5 feet (1.1 m) height and 3 feet (0.91 m) diameter. On top of the capital is an abacus of 1.5 feet (0.46 m) height, then a cube of 3 feet (0.91 m) and finally 5 feet (1.5 m) double statue of Garuda holding a snake in his hands, with a chakra wheel behind his head. Garuda, the vahana of Vishnu, is depicted as two fused people, sharing the back, each looking over their 180 degree space, one with the temples, the other towards the town. Near the platform, on the side facing the temples, is a Sanskrit inscription. It mentions the year 165 and the Hindu calendar month of Ashadha, and dedication to Vishnu-Janardhana. The Gupta year 165 implies that the pillar was dedicated in 484/485 CE. The pillar is sometimes referred to as the Buddhagupta pillar or Bhima pillar.

==== Varaha temple ====
The most unusual and remarkable temple is dedicated to the Varaha avatar of Vishnu. Typically, Varaha is presented in Hindu temples as a man-boar avatar. In Eran, it is a colossal theriomorphic representation of the Varaha legend, which Catherine Becker calls an "iconographic innovation".

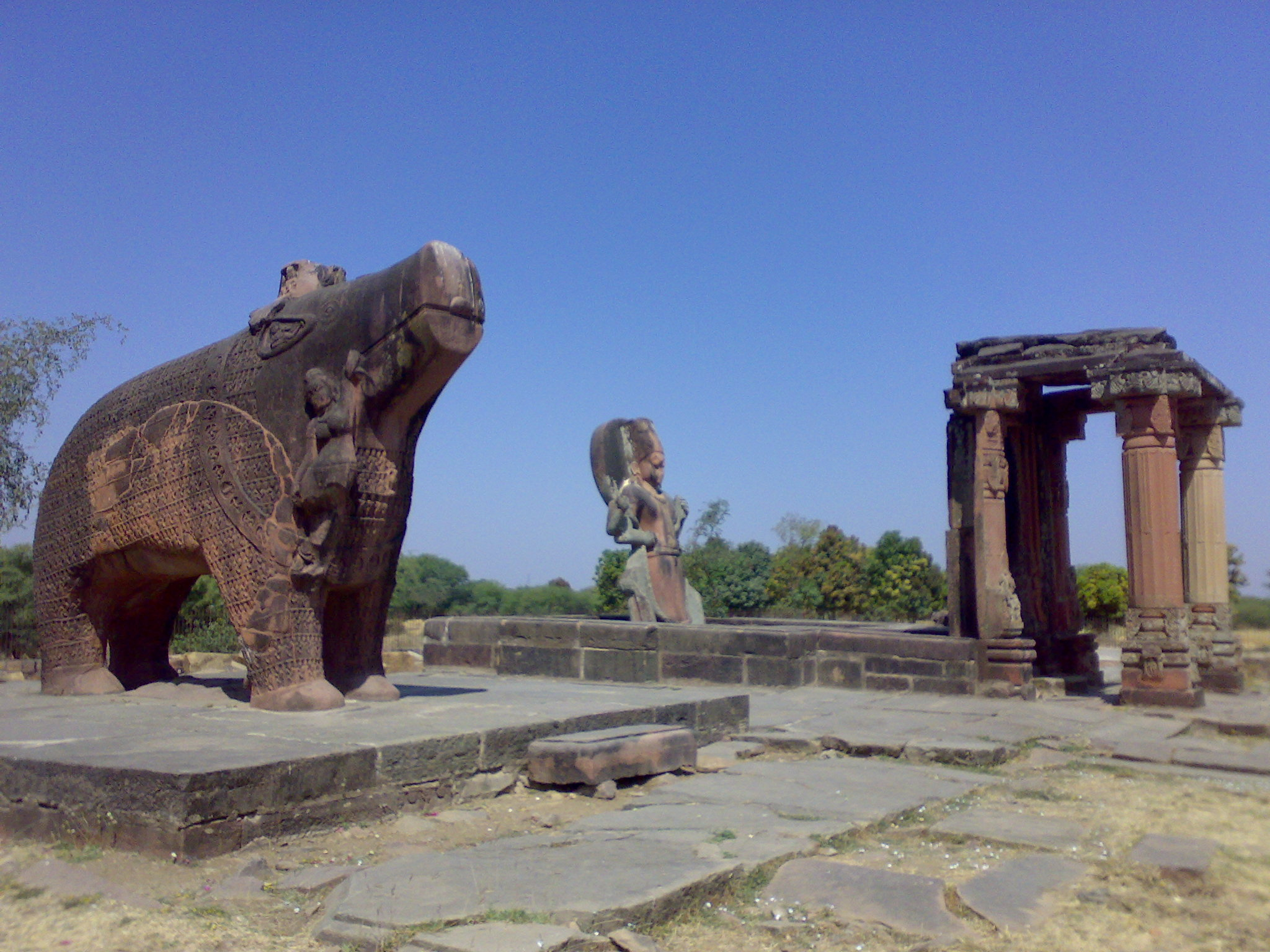
Eran colossal boar statue

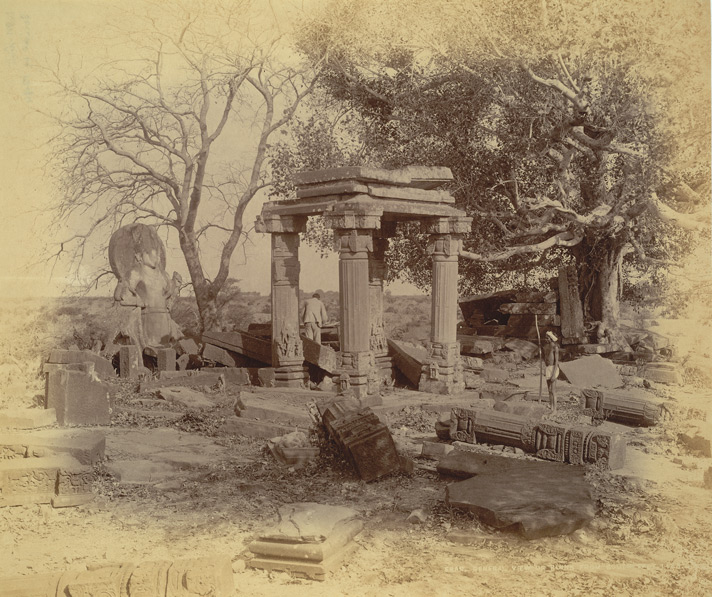
Ruins with broken pillars in 1892

The boar is made of stone, but the intricate carving of the surface of its body, a goddess hanging by its right tusk, inscriptions, and other details make the statue a symbolic narrative. The Eran site is in ruins, but there is enough remnants that suggest that the site was far more complex, and developed. Currently, the boar stands in open, but the foundation and stumps around it confirm that around it were walls, and mandapa that formed a complete temple. Scholars debate what the shape of the temple would have been. Cunningham, the first archaeologist to write a systematic report, suggested a rectangular shrine. Later scholars such as Catherine Becker suggests that it was likely larger, more along the lines of one found in Khajuraho shrine for Varaha.

==== Colossal Varaha ====
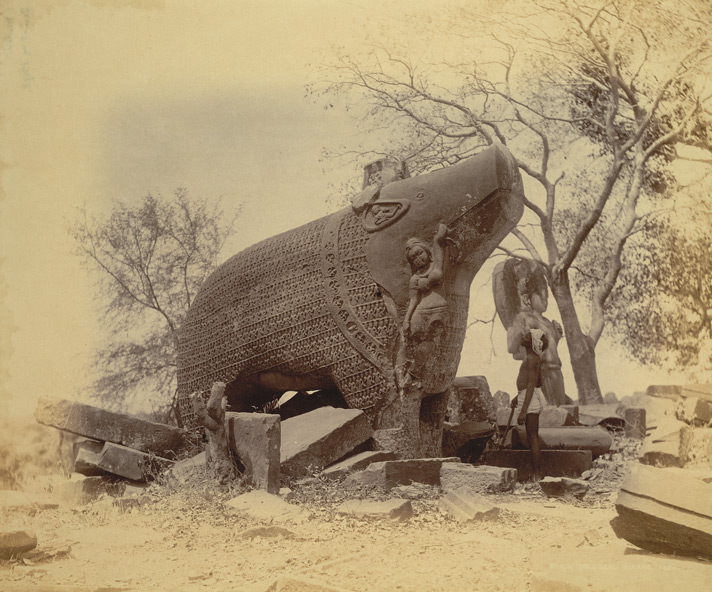
The Eran Varaha boar statue with ruins in late 19th-century, showing the relief on the boar's body.

The Colossal Varaha at Eran is the earliest known completely theriomorphic iconography for the Varaha avatar of Vishnu. The scene shown is the return of Varaha after he had successfully killed the oppressive demon Hiranyaksha, found and rescued goddess earth (Prithivi, Bhudevi), and the goddess is back safely. The Eran Varaha statue is significant for several reasons:

- it shows the importance and popularity of Vaishnavism and its legend of Vishnu avatars
- the statue includes goddess earth hanging by the boar's right tusk; she has a tidy hairdo bun, has a turban that is bejeweled, her face calm
- the floor is carved to depict the ocean (samudra) with serpents and sealife, a reminder of the oppressive demon who attacks dharma legend
- on the body of the Varaha are carved sages and saints of Hinduism identified by their simple robes, pointy beards, and hair knotted up like sadhus, by they holding kamandalu water pot in one hand and with a yoga mudra in the other, symbolizing knowledge needing protection, and god's benevolence when attacked by the oppressive demon Hiranyaksha
- the Varaha's tongue is sticking out slightly, on it is standing a small goddess who has been interpreted as Saraswati (or Vedic goddess Vac)
- in his ears are shown celestial musicians
- he wears a roundels garland on his shoulders and neck, these add up to 28 matching the 5th-century astronomy that used 28 major stars to divide the night skies into constellations; each of the roundels has miniature carvings with male and female figures
- the artists made the teeth of the boar humanlike, his eyes too are made to depict compassion
- on its front chest is the Toramana inscription which confirms that the Hunas has invaded the northwest, displaced Gupta Empire authority and their brief rule over the northwest and central India had begun in early 6th-century
- below the inscription are more Hindu sages, further below is ruined fragment that probably was an anthropomorphic carving of Vishnu to explicitly link the Varaha's underlying identity, states Becker.

The temple was built by king Dhyana Vishnu. Cunningham and others found it in ruins with pillars broken that suggest its destruction at some point rather than natural erosion. The boar stood on. It is 13.83 feet (4.22 m) long, 11.17 feet (3.40 m) high and 5.125 feet (1.562 m) wide. It was inside a sanctum. Cunningham states that there was also a mandapa in front because of the ruins of pillars he saw. He found two carved 10 feet high pillars which were "remarkably fine specimens of Hindu decorative art".

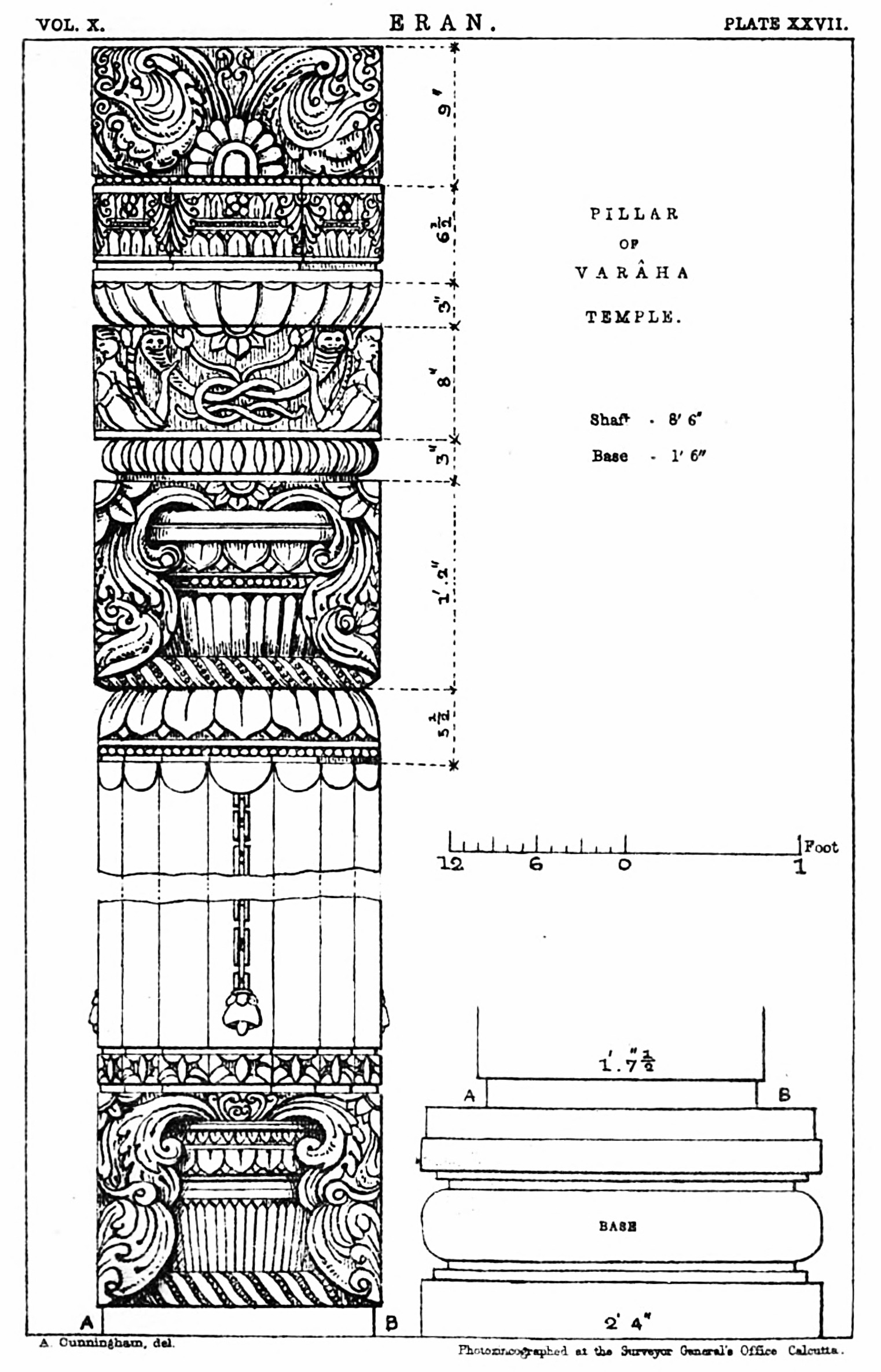
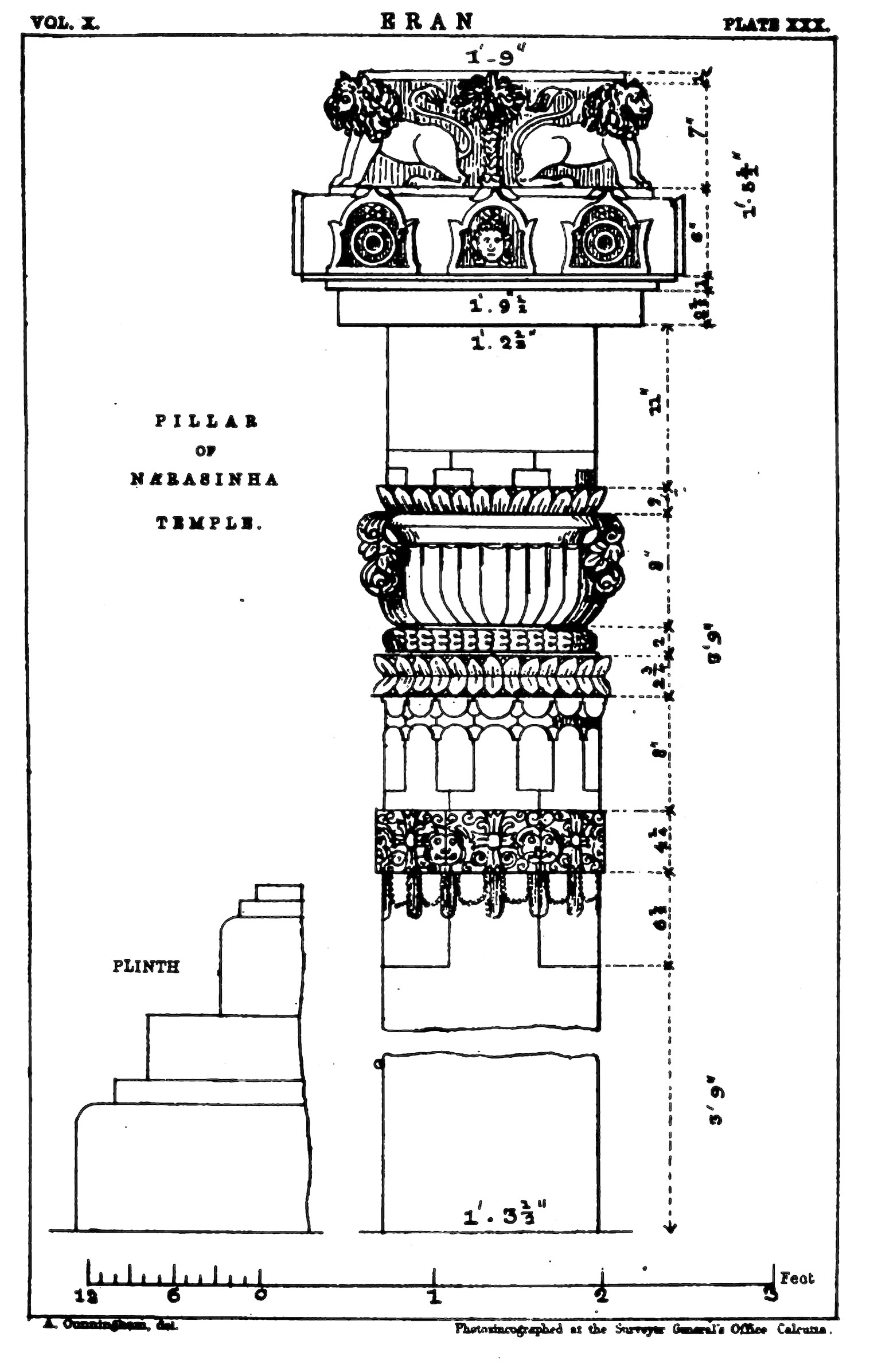
The pillar design at two Eran temples. Left: Varaha temple pillar; Right: Narasimha temple.

About 33 feet (10 m) in front of what is now the Varaha platform, there is another stone 6 feet by 3.5 feet. It is aligned with the temple alignment and set into the ground. On it is a large shell script inscription that remains undeciphered. It is probably the stone that formed the original temple's entrance. About 15 feet (4.6 m) in front of this entrance stone is the ruined leftovers of a torana (Hindu arched gateway). The gateway pillars are broken, but one of them survives, and it is ornamented ("G" in the plan drawings). Cunningham searched for broken parts of the pillars, but only found a few broken statues, and most of the torana pillars gone.

Next to the Varaha temple remnants are two terraces, one to the south that is 13 feet (4.0 m) sided square, another 13.5 feet (4.1 m) by 9.25 feet (2.82 m). These were likely temples too, but they are lost.

==== Vishnu temple ====
The Vishnu Temple is to the north of the Varaha temple. It has a damaged colossal statue of Vishnu that is 13.17 feet (4.01 m) high. This temple is also mostly ruined, but shows signs of having a sanctum, a mandapa, and all the elements of a Hindu temple. Just like the Varaha temple, the Vishnu temple had intricately carved pillars, but with a different design. Parts of the door jamb before the sanctum have survived, and these show the traditional river goddesses Ganga, and Yamuna as flanking the sanctum entrance, but they are positioned nearer to the floor like late Gupta era temples. Cunningham dated this temple as probably built in 5th or 6th century, about two or three centuries after the neighboring early Gupta era Varaha temple. The remnants of the entrance, wrote Cunningham, are "lavishly decorated", with the surviving reliefs showing daily life and rites-of-passage scenes. Near the temple are ruins of a gateway and other monuments, including one which was likely a Vamana temple. According to Cunningham, one of the smaller shrine monuments had a man-boar sculpture which he located in the town of Eran.

==== Narasimha temple ====
The Narasimha Temple is the northernmost substantial structure ruins in the group, though there were additional temples according to excavations by Cunningham. The Narasimha temple was a single room of 12.5 feet by 8.75 feet with a mandapa in front on four pillars. These pillars are now missing, but the remnants on the plinth confirm that they once did. The broken pillars found at the site among the ruins, and who dimensions match the leftover plinth profile, show that the pillars were intricately carved. The sanctum had a 7 feet (2.1 m) high Narasimha statue, the man-lion avatar of Vishnu.

==== Hanuman temple ====
Old temple of Hanuman, about 750 CE.

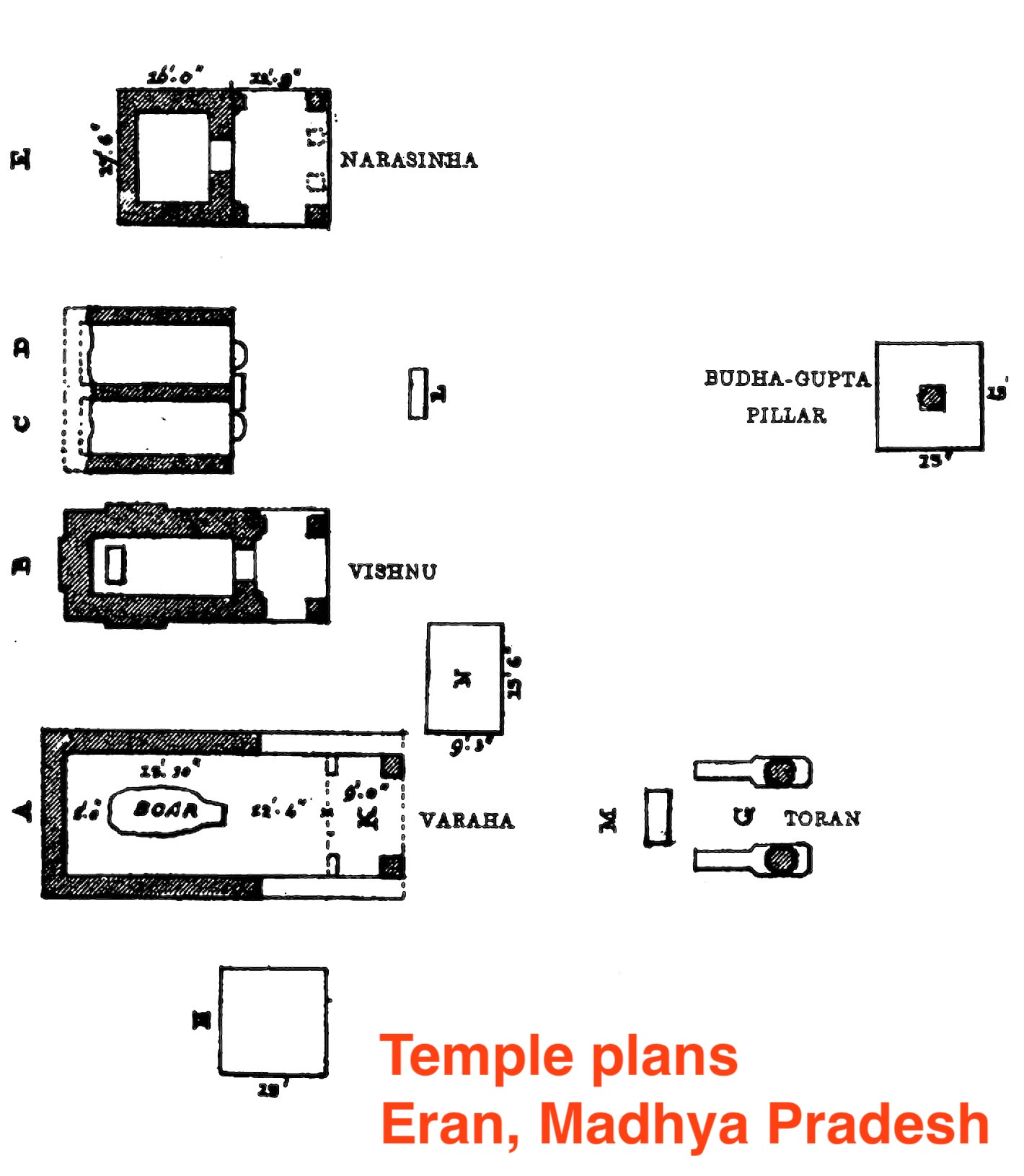
Temple plans

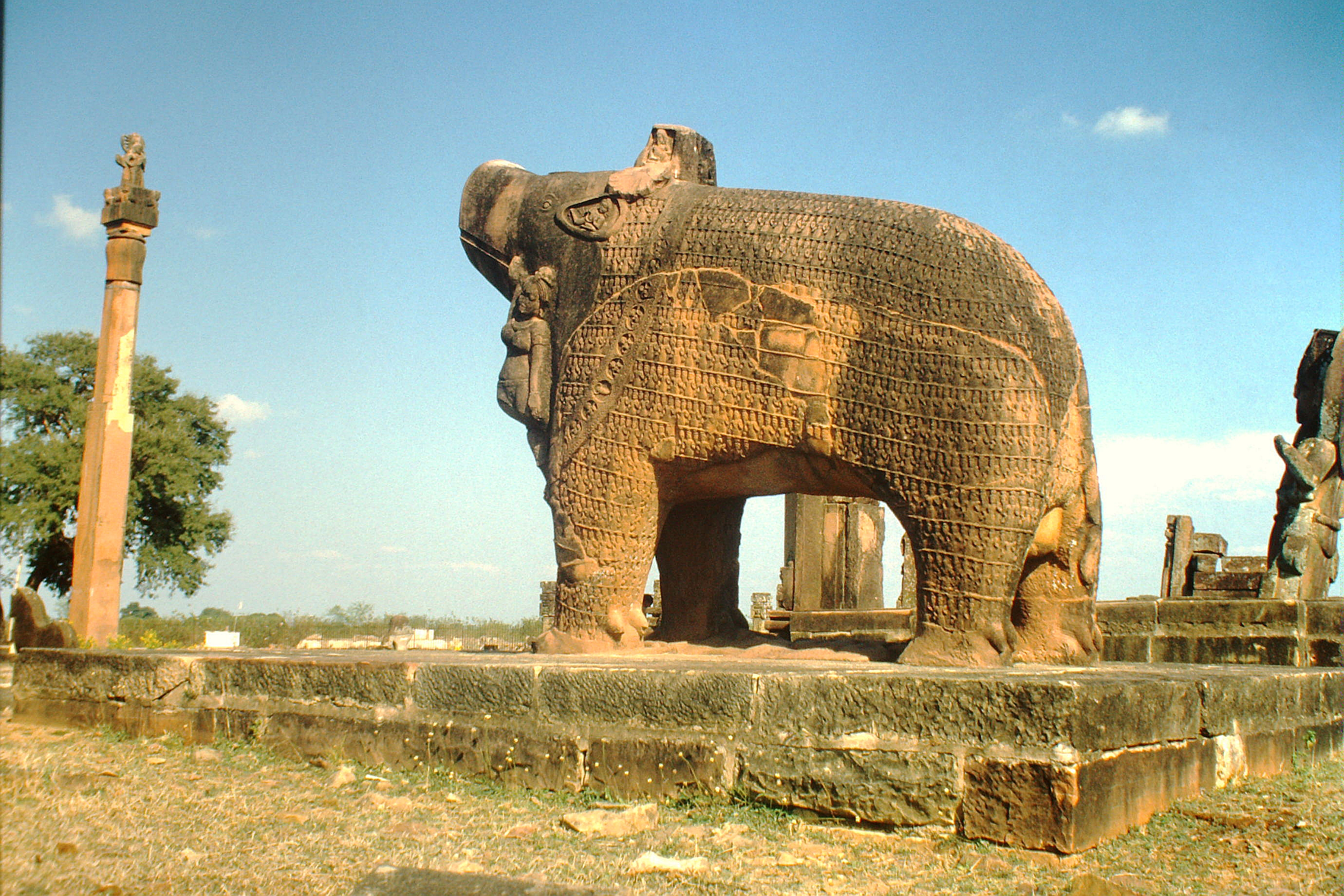
The body of the stone boar statue has carvings of sages and scholars.

=== Coins ===
Eran was likely one of the ancient mints for Indian kingdoms, along with Vidisha, Ujjain and Tripuri. A large number of antique coins, of different styles, shapes, and inscriptions spanning the last few centuries of the 1st millennium BCE through the 7th-century have been discovered here. Over 3,000 coins found here have been dated to between 300 BCE to 100 CE. Square coins were Eran's specialty and these predominate in excavated discoveries. According to Brown, the ancient Erakina or Eran mint innovated the "die-method" a far more perfect technique to make coins than "punch-marked coins", thereby distinguishing itself. Cunningham, a late 19th-century archaeologist, states that "copper coins of Eran are the finest specimen" that he found across India, as well "remarkable also for presenting the largest and smallest specimens of old Indian money". The largest coin has measured about 1.1 inches (28 mm) and the smallest about 0.2 inches (5.1 mm) in diameter. Cunningham grouped the found coins in four:

1. Punch-marked coins
2. Cast coins
3. Die struck coins
4. Inscribed coins

The common motifs on the coin include goddess Lakshmi seated with two elephants flanking her as if spraying water, horses, elephants, bull, trees (probably Bodhi), flowers particularly lotus, swastikas, rivers, Buddhist symbols such as dharmachakra, and tri-ratna, triangles. Almost all coins, states Cunningham, show an unusual symbol consisting of a cross with circle in four sections.

One of the coins found in Eran with the name Dharmapala stamped on it is in Brahmi script. This copper coin is presently displayed in the British Museum, in London. This, stated Cunningham in 1891, is among the earliest inscribed coins in India. On the paleographic grounds this coin has been assigned to the late 3rd century BCE. Another circular lead piece bearing the name of another ruler "Indragupta", assignable to the same period has been discovered at Eran. Several inscribed copper coins bearing the name 'Erakannya' or 'Erakana' in the Brahmi script have also been found at Eran. Cunningham proposed that the symbol of the river represent the river Bina on which the village stands. He also surmised that the semi-circle on the coins was representative of the old Eran town. Which was probably so shaped. Bronze coin of Eran of the 3rd Century B.C was found at Sulur, in the Coimbatore district of Tamil Nadu in one of the excavations.

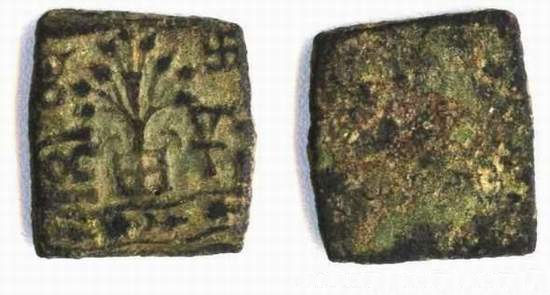
Eran Vidisha coin.

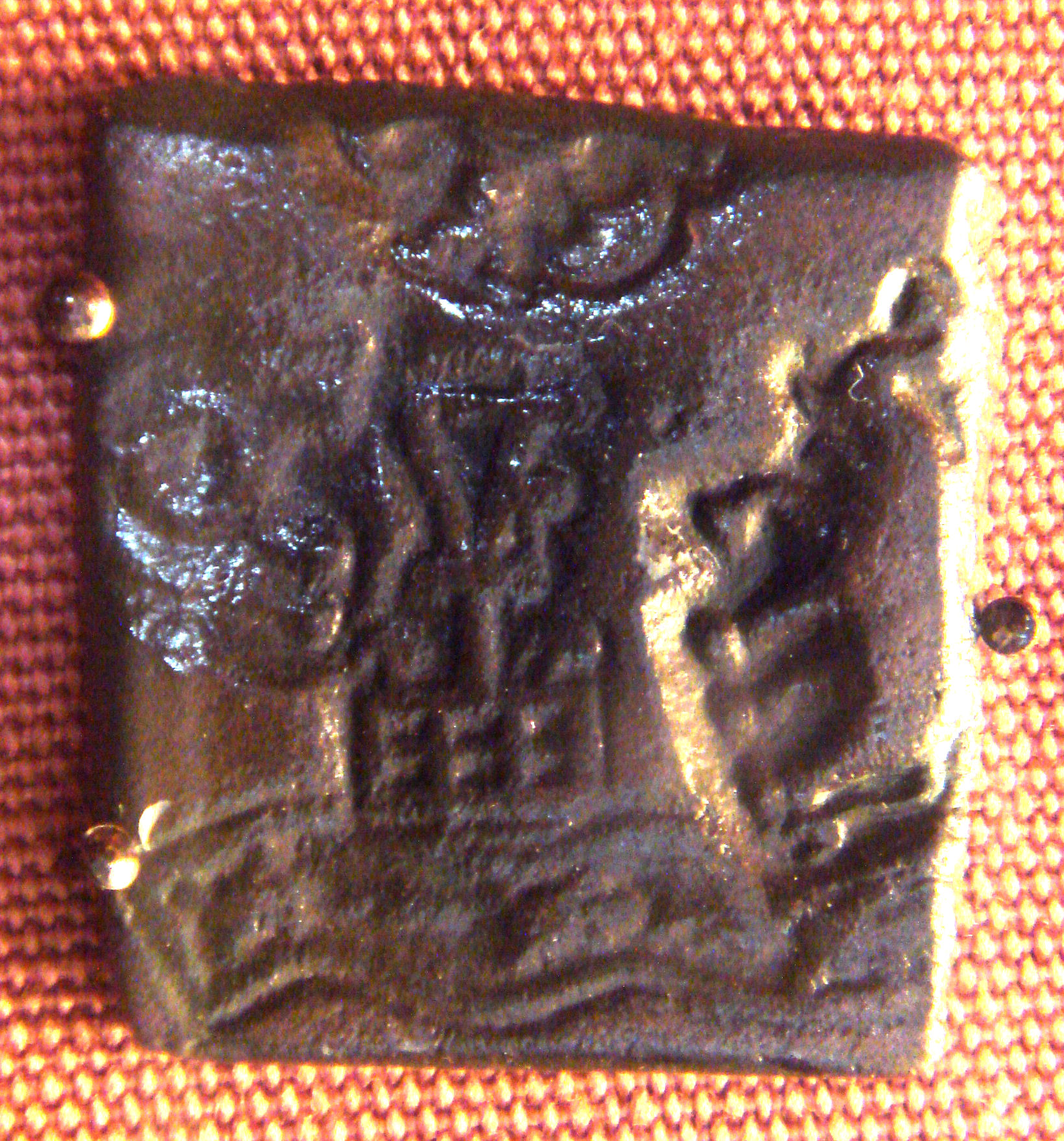
Eran coin (2nd century BCE).

=== Inscriptions ===
==== Inscription of Sridharavarman (circa 350 CE) ====
Eran pillar inscription of Sridharavarman

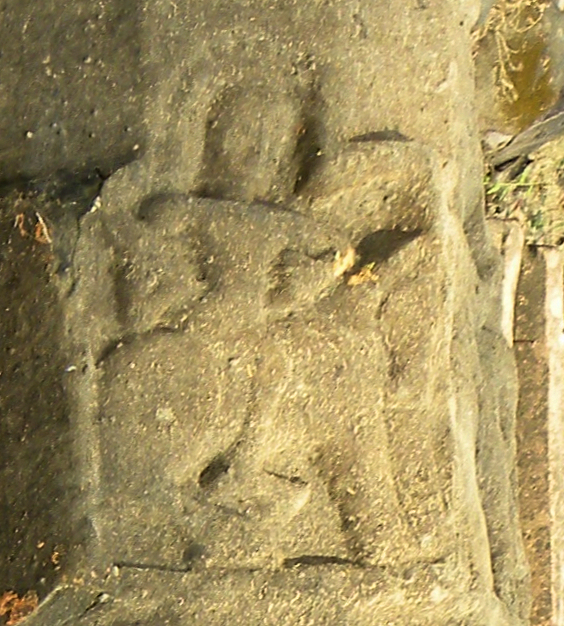
Horserider on the pillar

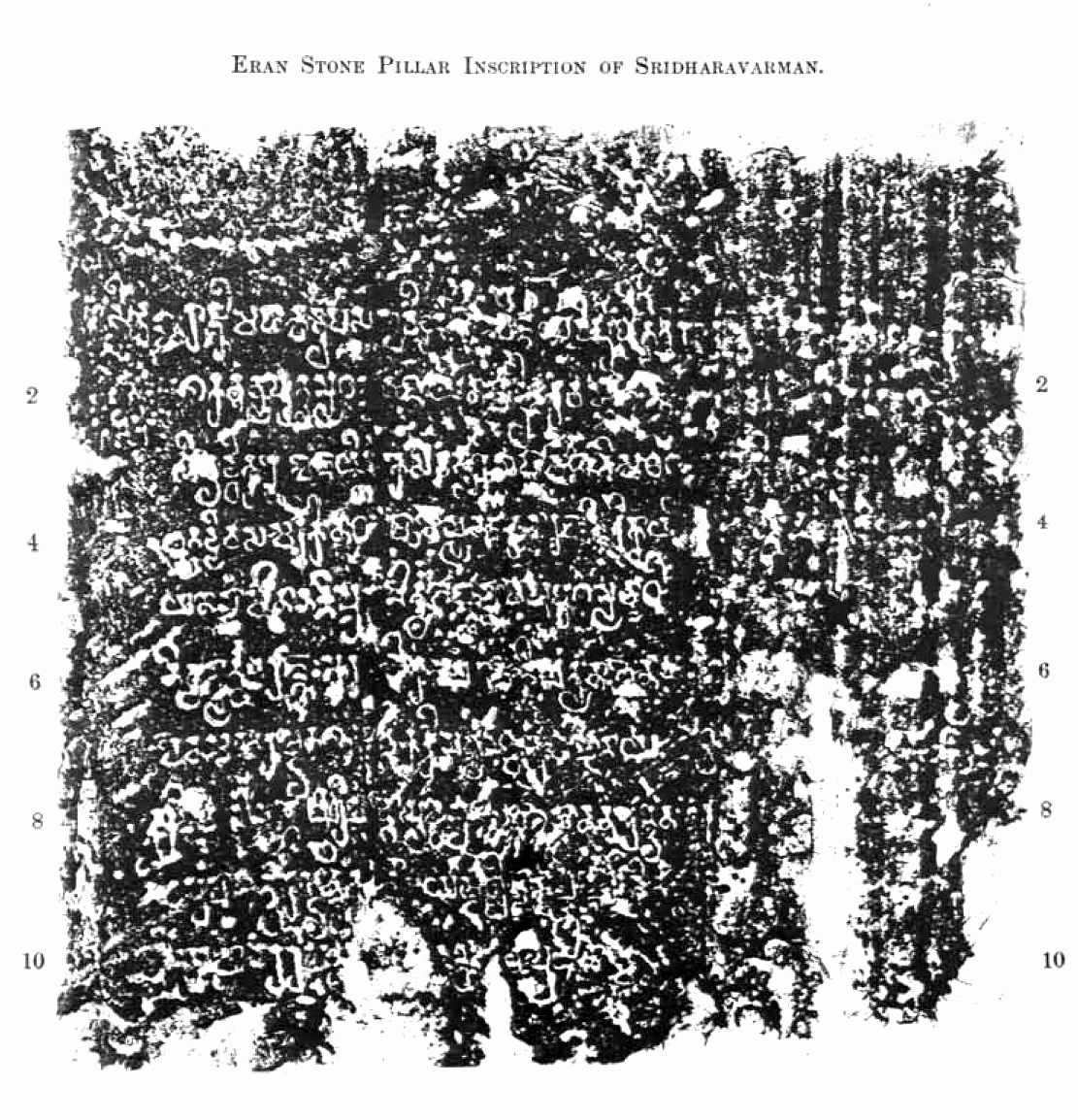
Eran inscription of Saka King Sridharavarman

The Saka (Indo-Scythian) king Sridharavarman, who ruled in Central India circa 339-368 CE, made an inscription of a small pillar at Eran, together with his Naga military commander. Bhanugupta later also wrote his inscription on the same pillar, circa 510 CE.

It seems that the inscription of Sridharavarman is succeeded chronologically by a monument and an inscription by Gupta Empire Samudragupta (r.336-380 CE), established "for the sake of augmenting his fame", who may therefore have ousted Sridharavarman in his campaigns to the West.

==== Inscription of Samudragupta ====
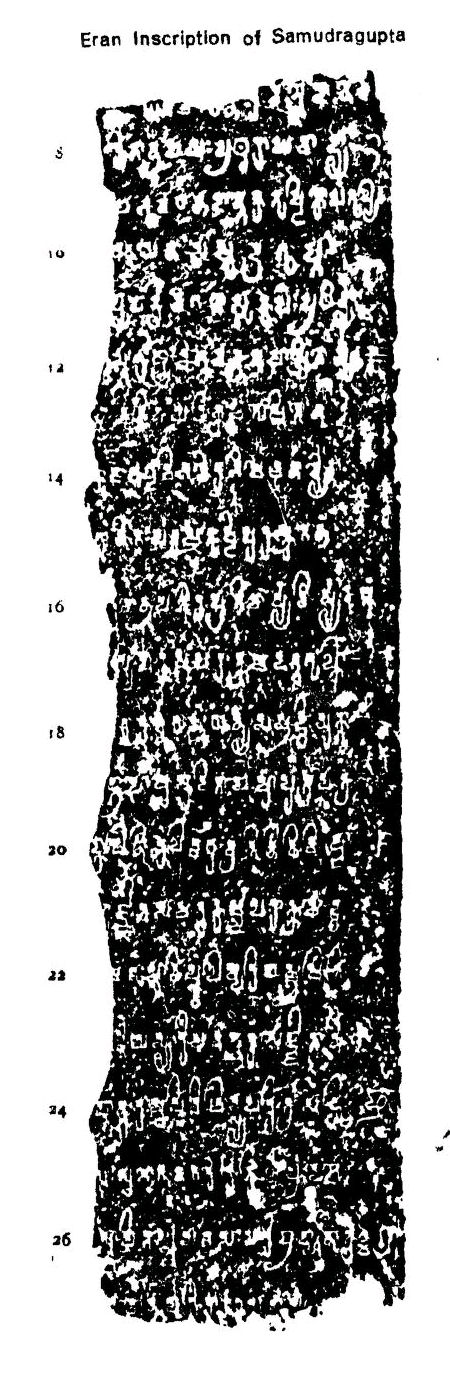
Eran inscription of Samudragupta.

The Eran Inscription of Samudragupta (336-380 CE) is presently stored in Kolkata Indian Museum. The inscription, in red sandstone, was found not far to the west of the ruined temple of the boar. Though damaged and much of the inscription is missing, this was a significant find, states Cunningham, because on it are numeral scripts, with at least "2, 3, 4, 5, 6 and 7" preserved.

==== Inscription of Budhagupta (484–485 CE) ====
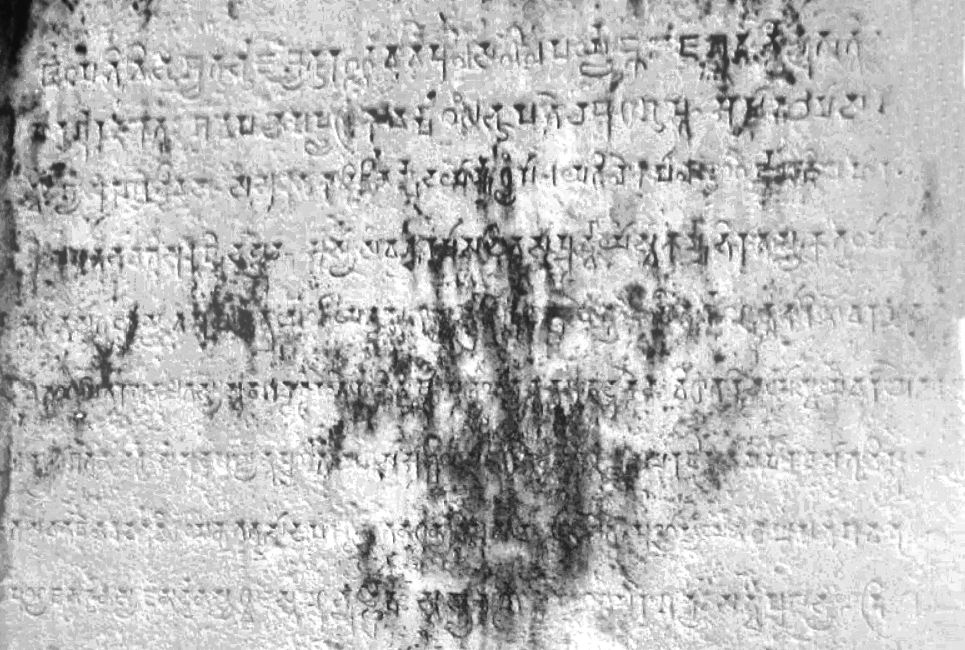
Budhagupta pillar inscription at Eran.

The Budhagupta inscription is dated to 484–485 CE. It is s Vaishnava inscription. It describes that the Gupta kingdom stretched from Kalindi River to Narmada River, that the inscription marks the raising of a column in honour of Janardana, another name of Vishnu.

==== Inscription of Toramana (circa 500 CE) ====
The Eran boar inscription of Toramana is a stone inscription with 8 lines of Sanskrit, first three of which are in meter, and rest in prose, written in a North Indian script. It is carved on the chest of a freestanding 11 feet (3.4 m) high red sandstone boar statue, a zoomorphic iconography of Vishnu avatar and dated to the 6th century. The inscription names king Toramana, a King of the Alchon Huns, as ruling over Malwa ("governing the earth") and records that a Dhanyaviṣṇu is dedicating a stone temple to Narayana (Vishnu).

==== Inscription of Bhanugupta (510 CE) ====
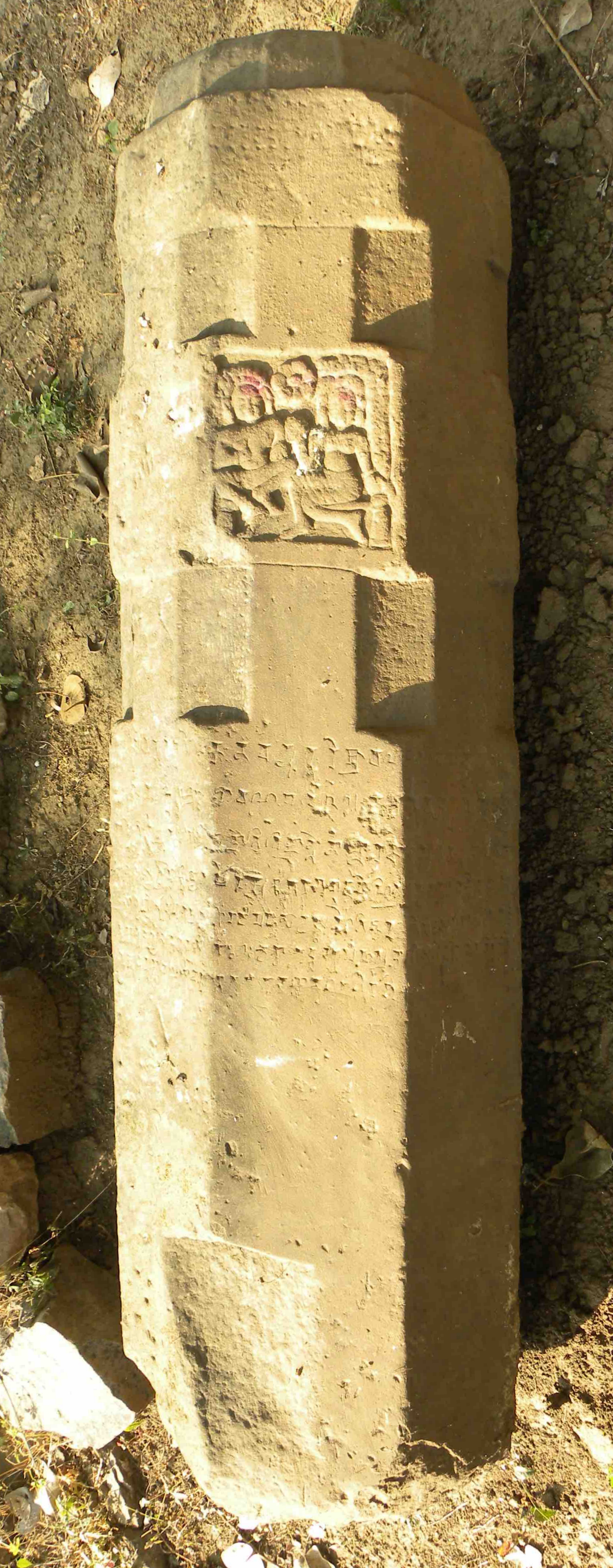
Eran inscription of Goparaja, on the reverse of the pillar of Sridharavarman. Probable depiction of Goparaja and his wife.

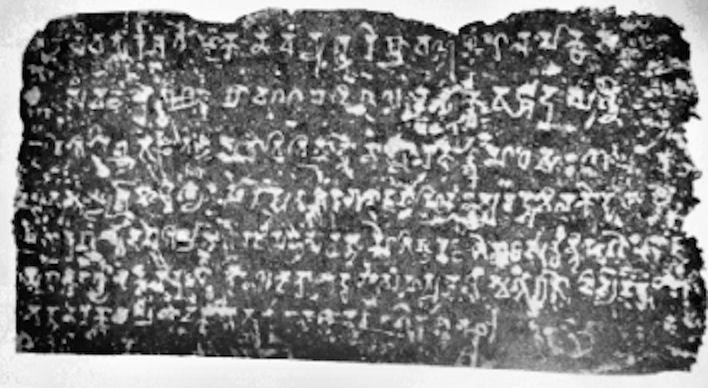
Eran stone pillar inscription of Bhanugupta.

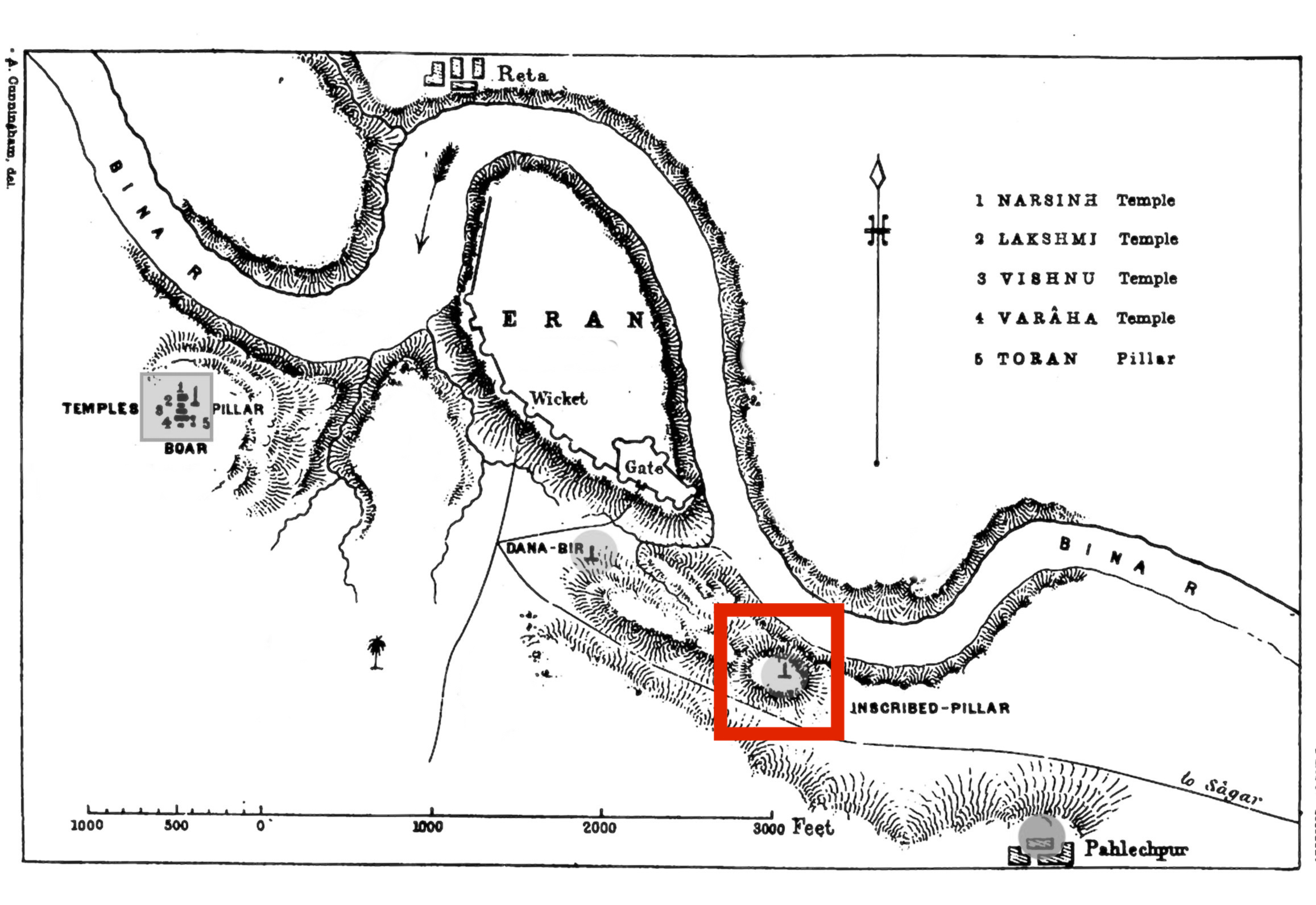
Location of the pillar of Sridharavarman with his inscription (c.350 CE) and that of Bhanugupta (510 CE). Coordinates: 24.0864°N 78.1762°E

The fourth inscription is badly damaged, but important. The inscription mentions Bhanugupta and is inscribed on the reverse of the Sridharavarman pillar. It also mentions the death of chieftain or noble Goparaja in a battle the 191st year without mentioning calendar system. This is generally accepted as Gupta era 191, or 510 CE. It also mentions the cremation of Goparaja, and his wife also cremated herself on the funeral pyre. This, states Shelat, is one of the earliest recorded instances of Sati. Cunningham did not comment on this Bhanugupta-Goparaja inscription, but did comment on three Sati stones he found, and stated that earliest Sati stone monument he found is from Samvat 1361 (1304 CE). The Bhanugupta inscription does not use the word sati or equivalent and the inscription was interpolated by Fleet in the first edition, later revised in the second edition:

Line 7 (actual surviving inscription): bhakt=anurakta cha priya cha kanta bhr=alag=anugat=agirsim

Line 7 (Fleet's interpolation): bhakt=anurakta ch priya cha kanta bh[a]r[y]=a[va]lag[n]=anugat=ag[n]ir[a]sim

Fleet's translation (1st edition): and (his) devoted, attached, beloved and beauteous wife, in close companionship, accompanied (him) onto the funeral pyre.

Fleet's translation (2nd edition): and (his) devoted, attached, beloved and beauteous wife, clinging (to him), entered into the mass of fire (funeral pyre).

Eran site has yielded additional sati stones. Alexander Cunningham mentioned three inscribed Sati stones in and around the Eran site including villages across the river in his archaeological survey report for 1874–1875. With inscriptions on them, he dated the first one to the reign of Sultan Mahmud Khilchi of Mandugar-durg, and Chanderi, the second to 1664 CE during the reign of Patisahi Sahi Jahan who Cunningham speculated was likely a jagir and noble in court of Shah Jahan, and a third stone he dated to 1774 CE during the rule of Pandit Balwant Rau Govind and Balaji Tuka Deva.

== See also ==
- Pataini temple
