= Uchchhakalpa dynasty =

Uchchhakalpa
- c. 5th century CE–c. 6th century CE
- Status: Vassal of Gupta Empire
- Capital: Uchchhakalpa (modern Unchehara)
- Government: Monarchy
- History
  - Established: c. 5th century CE
  - Disestablished: c. 6th century CE

Find spots of the Uchchhakalpa inscriptions (map of India)

The Uchchhakalpa (IAST: Ucchakalpa) dynasty ruled parts of central India during 5th and 6th centuries. Their territory included north-eastern parts of present-day Madhya Pradesh. Their capital was located at Uchchhakalpa, the present-day Unchehara.

The Uchchhakalpas were neighbours of the Parivrajakas, and appear to have been feudatories of the Gupta Empire. The dynasty is known from inscriptions issued by two of its kings: Jayanatha and Sharvanatha.

== History ==
Inscriptions of two Uchchhakalpa kings, dated in an unspecified calendar era, are available: Jayanatha (Year 174–182) and Sarvanatha (Year 191–214). The era is now generally identified with the Gupta era (which begins in 318–319 CE), although some earlier scholars identified it as the Kalachuri era (which begins in 248–249 CE). The Uchchhakalpa inscriptions are written in the central Indian variety of the Gupta script. Moreover, the Bhumara stone pillar inscription names the Uchchhakalpa ruler Sharvanatha and the Parivrajaka ruler Hastin as contemporaries. This suggests that both were vassals of the Guptas, and the calendar era mentioned in the Uchchhakalpa inscriptions is the Gupta era.

According to these inscriptions, the earliest king of the dynasty was Oghadeva. He was succeeded by Kumaradeva, Jayasvamin, and Vyaghra. Jayanatha, the dynasty's earliest king attested by his own inscriptions, was a son of king Vyaghra and queen Ajjhitadevi. Jayanatha was succeeded by Sharvanatha, who was his son from queen Murundasvamini. Nothing is known about the successors of Sharvanatha.

== Genealogy ==
The following kings and queens of the dynasty are known (IAST names):

- Mahārāja Ogha-deva and Mahādevi Kumarā-devī
- Mahārāja Kumarā-deva and Mahādevi Jaya-svāminī
- Mahārāja Jaya-svāmin and Mahādevi Ramā-devī
- Mahārāja Vyāghra and Mahādevi Ajjhita-devī
- Mahārāja Jaya-nātha and Mahādevi Murunda-svaminī, r. c. 493–507 CE
- Mahārāja Śarva-nātha (Sharvanatha), r. c. 508–533 CE

== Inscriptions ==
The following copper-plate inscriptions from the Uchchhakalpa reign have been discovered.

Find spot	Issued by	Year (CE year, assuming Gupta era)	Purpose	Source
Karitalai	Jayanatha	174 (493–494 CE)	Land grant	
Khoh	Jayanatha	177 (496–497 CE)	Grant of a village to Brahmins	
Unchehara	Jayanatha	182 (501–502 CE)	Village grant. See Katni copper-plate of Jayanātha.	
Sohawal	Sharvanatha	191 (510–511 CE)		
Khoh	Sharvanatha	193 (512–513 CE)	Village grant	
Khoh	Sharvanatha	197 (516–517 CE)	One of the copper plates is missing, but it appears to be a village grant as it quotes a Mahabharata verse which states that it is the king's duty to protect the land granted by him or his ancestors.	
Navagrama	Sharvanatha and Parivrajaka ruler Hastin	198 (517 CE)	Grant of a village to the Brahmins of Parashara gotra and Madhyandina Shakha	
Khoh	Sharvanatha	214 (533–534 CE)	Grant of villages for the worship of the goddess Pishtapurika	
Khoh	Sharvanatha	Undated	Grant of a village to Chhodugomika	

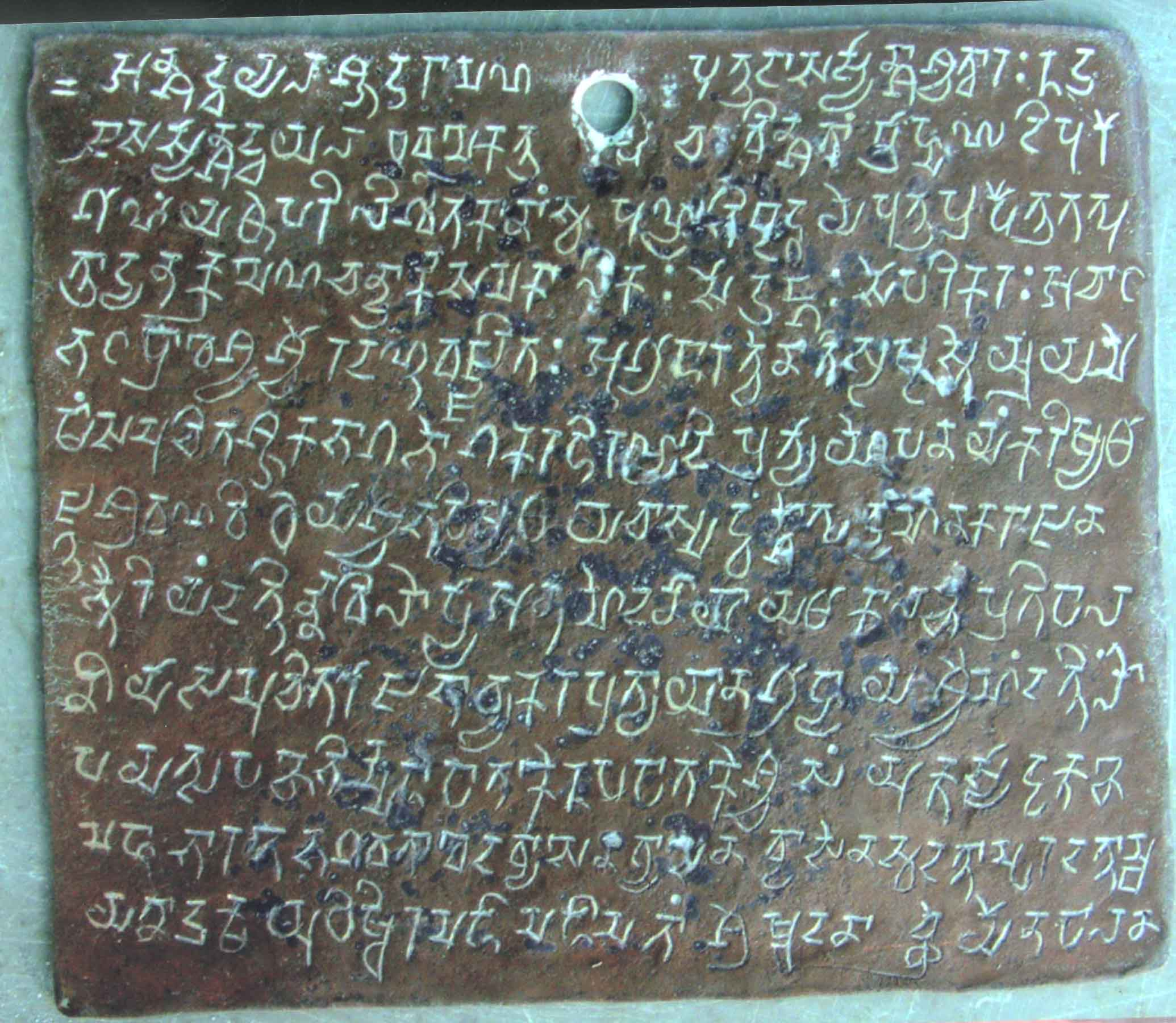
Katni inscription of Jayanatha, Plate 1

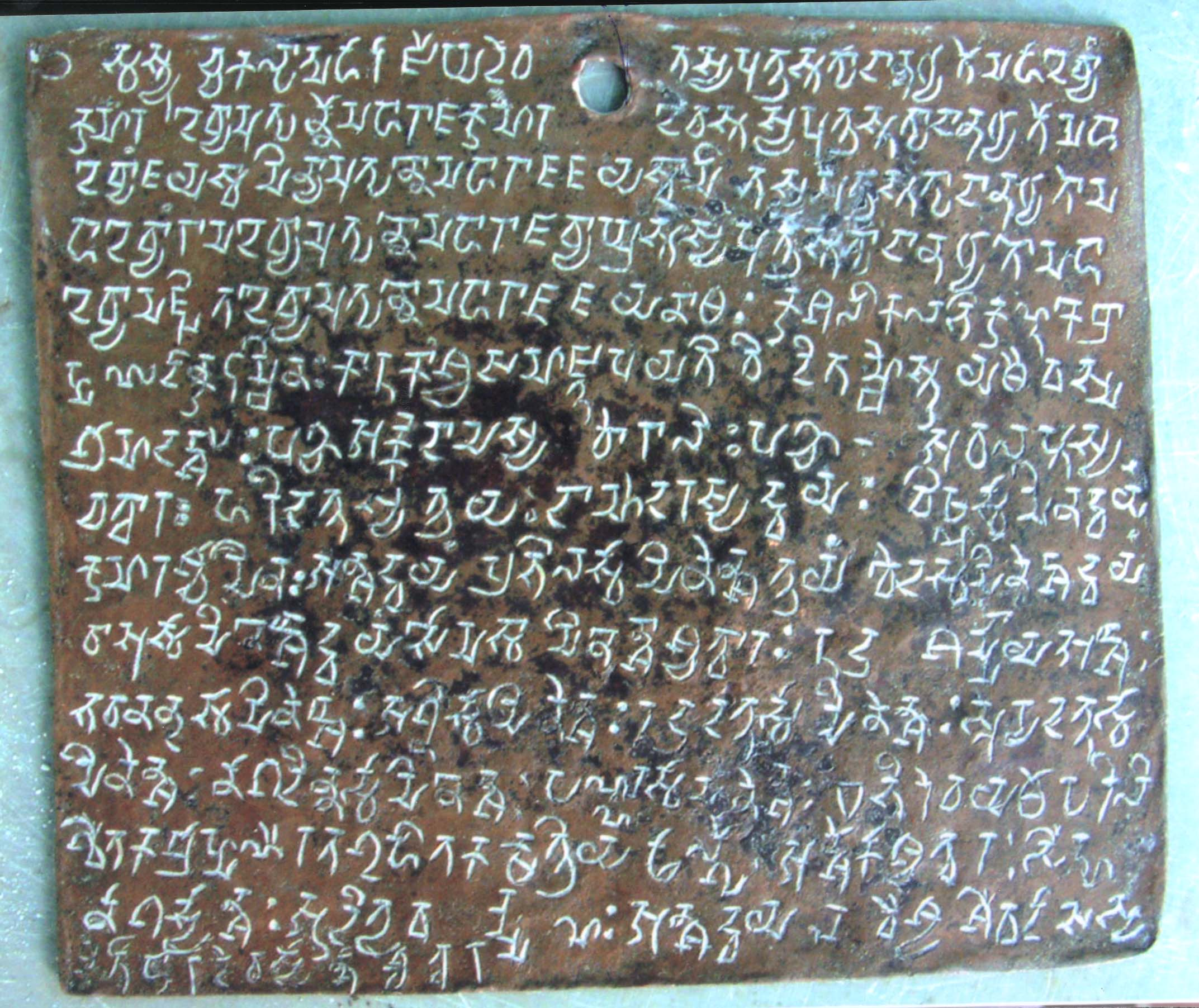
Katni inscription of Jayanatha, Plate 2

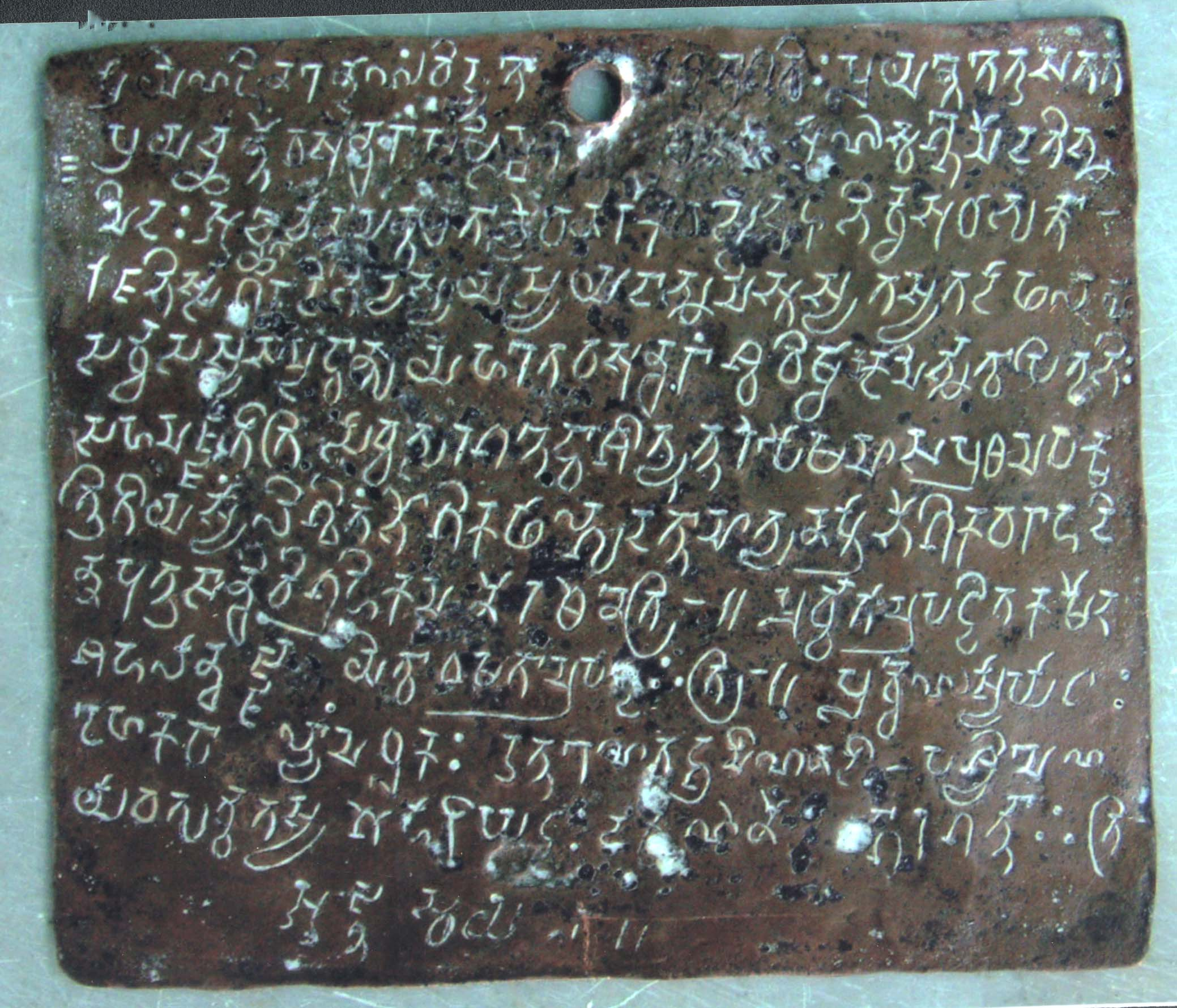
Katni inscription of Jayanatha, Plate 3

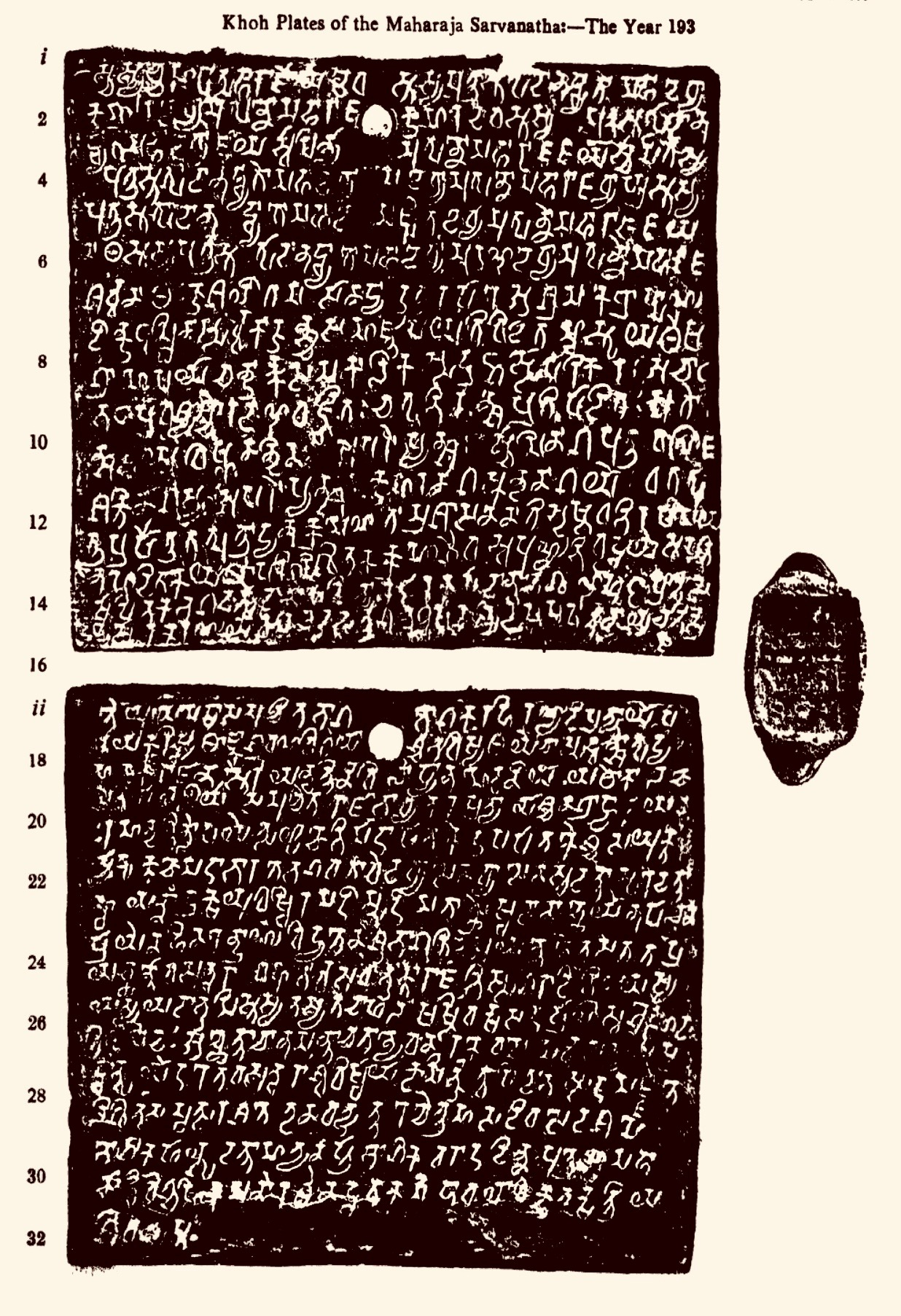
512-513 Khoh inscription of Sharvanatha

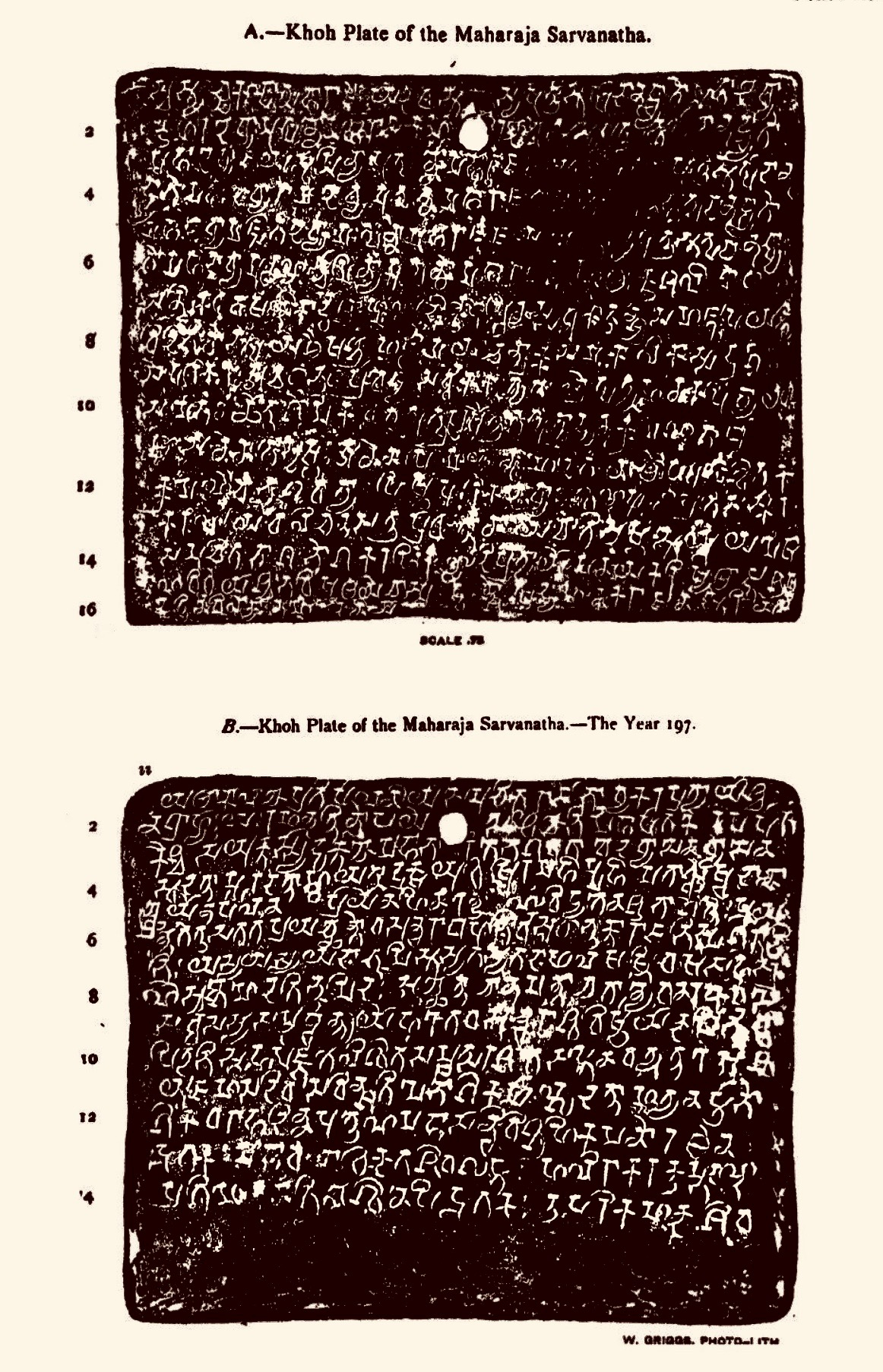
517 Khoh inscription of Sharvanatha

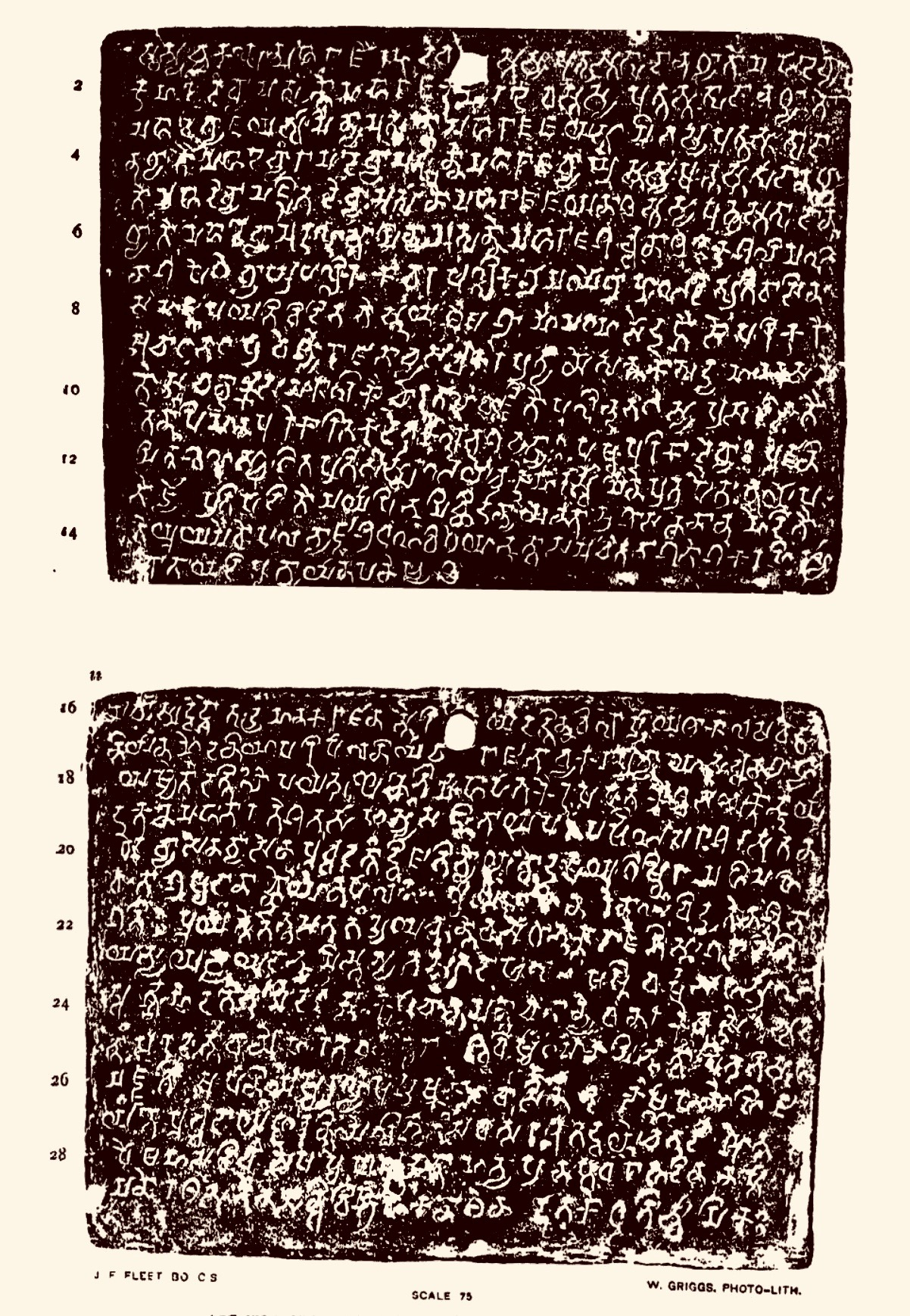
533-534 Khoh inscription of Sharvanatha

Inscriptions of a Vakataka feudatory named Vyaghra-deva have been found at Nachna-Ganj. According to one theory, this ruler may be identical with the Vyaghra of Uchchhakalpa dynasty, but this identification is doubtful.
