= Amdara =

Town in Madhya Pradesh

- Town
- Location in Madhya Pradesh, India
- Coordinates: 24.10°N 80.57°E
- Country: India
- State: Madhya Pradesh
- District: Maihar district

Languages
  - Official: Hindi
- PIN: 485771
- Vehicle registration: MP 19

Amdara is a town and a railway station in Maihar district of Madhya Pradesh. It is also a proposed tehsil headquarters. It's belongs to Rewa Division.

== Geography ==
Amdara is located at 24.10°N 80.57°E. It has an average elevation of 367 metres (1204 ft). It is in the Maihar district on the Jabalpur–Satna railway line.

== Demographics ==
As per Census of India 2011, Amdara town has population of 2,524 of which 1,281 are males while 1,243 are females.

== Transportation ==
Amdara is well connected with roadways and railways.

The town is located on the Jabalpur–Prayagraj railway line and connected with many major cities.

Amdara is situated between Katni and Maihar, with daily bus services.
