= Maa Sharda Mandir, Maihar =

Hindu temple in Maihar, Madhya Pradesh

Coordinates: 24°15′40″N 80°43′23″E

Maa Sharda Temple
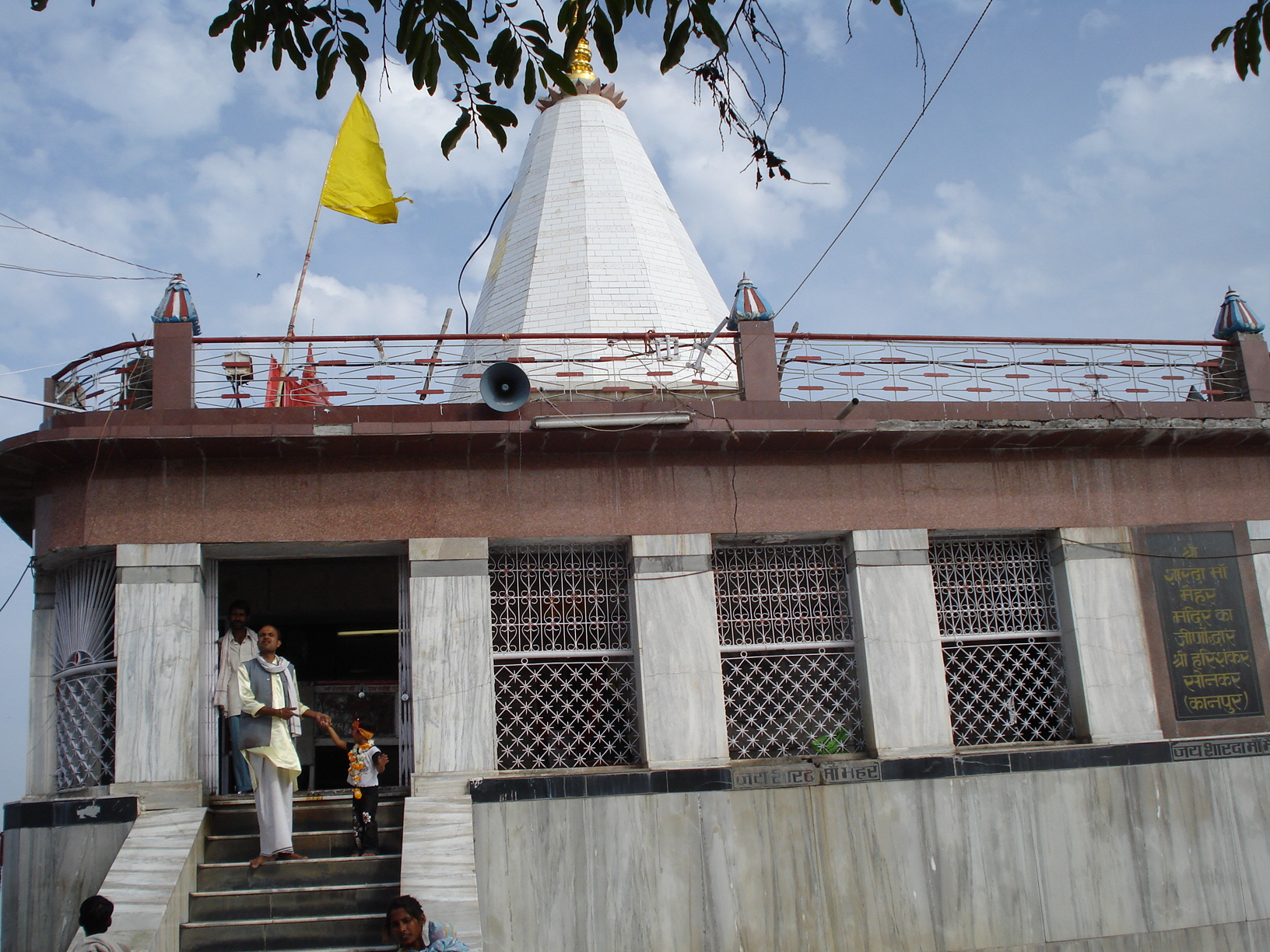

Religion
- Affiliation: Hinduism
- District: Maihar district
- Deity: Sharda

Location
- Location: Maihar
- State: Madhya Pradesh
- Country: India
- Interactive map of Maa Sharda Temple

Website
- www.maihartemple.com

Maa Sharda Temple is a Hindu temple of Goddess Sharda in Maihar district of Madhya Pradesh in India. It is believed that Goddess Sharda is the incarnation of Goddess Saraswati. This temple is also ventured as a Shakta pithas in the Shakt tradition. It is believed that even today, Alha visits the temple to worship Goddess Sharda.

Alha and Udal are believed to be the inaugural visitors to the goddess in this remote forest. Alha, in his reverence, affectionately referred to the mother goddess as 'Sharda Mai,' a name that subsequently evolved into the popular title of 'Mata Sharda Mai.' This association underscores the deep spiritual connection between the legendary warriors and the divine presence of Sharda Devi in this sacred enclave.

== History ==
In religious texts, it is mentioned that Sati, the daughter of Daksha Prajapati, wished to marry Lord Shiva. But, her wish was not approved by Daksha Prajapati. However, Sati married Lord Shiva. Once, Brahma, Vishnu, Indra, and other deities were invited in a yagya performed by Daksh Prajapati. Lord Shiva was not invited in the yagya. So, Sati asked her father the reason for not inviting Lord Shiva, due to which, Daksh Prajapati abused Lord Shiva. As a result of the incidence, Sati sacrificed her life by jumping into the yagya fire pit. When Lord Shiva realised the incident, he opened his third eye in anger. For saving the universe, Lord Vishnu split Sati's body into 51 parts. Wherever Sati's body parts fell, Shakta pithas were established there. It is also believed that Sati's necklace fell in Maihar. It is believed that the temple was discovered by two brothers, Alha and Udal. They were devotees of Goddess Sharda. They discovered the temple on the top of Trikut mountains in the middle of the forests. After this incidence, Alha performed penance for 12 years to please the Goddess. The Goddess blessed him with immortality. It is believed that even today, Alha visits the temple every day during Brahma Muhurta and worships the Goddess.
