= Maihar Assembly constituency =

Constituency of the Madhya Pradesh legislative assembly in India

Coordinates: 24.26°N 80.76°E

Maihar
- Constituency No. 65 for the Madhya Pradesh Legislative Assembly

Constituency details
- Country: India
- Region: Central India
- State: Madhya Pradesh
- District: Maihar
- Lok Sabha constituency: Satna
- Established: 1951
- Reservation: None

Member of Legislative Assembly
- 16th Madhya Pradesh Legislative Assembly
- Incumbent Shrikant Chaturvedi
- Party: Bharatiya Janata Party
- Elected year: 2023
- Preceded by: Narayan Tripathi

Maihar is one of the 230 Vidhan Sabha (Legislative Assembly) constituencies of Madhya Pradesh state in central India. This constituency came into existence in 1951. It is one of the 7 Vidhan Sabha constituencies located in Satna district. The constituency is part of Satna Lok Sabha constituency. As of 2023, its representative is Srikant Chaturvedi of the Bharatiya Janata Party.

== Members of Legislative Assembly ==
=== Vindhya Pradesh Legislative Assembly ===
Year	Member	Party
1952	Ramadhar Pandey	Indian National Congress

=== Madhya Pradesh Legislative Assembly ===
Election	Name	Party
1957	Gopal Sharan Singh	Indian National Congress
1962	Gopal Sharan Singh	Indian National Congress
1967	Gopal Sharan Singh	Indian National Congress
1972	Lalji Patel	Indian National Congress
1977	Narayan Singh	Janata Party
1980	Vijay Narayan Rai	Indian National Congress (Indira)
1985	Lalji Patel	Independent politician
1990	Narayan Singh	Janata Dal
1993	Mathura Prasad Patel	Indian National Congress
1998	Vrindavan Badgainiya	Indian National Congress
2003	Narayan Tripathi	Samajwadi Party
2008	Moti Lal Tiwari	Bharatiya Janata Party
2013	Narayan Tripathi	Indian National Congress
2016^	Narayan Tripathi	Bharatiya Janata Party
2018	Narayan Tripathi	Bharatiya Janata Party
2023	Srikant Chaturvedi	Bharatiya Janata Party

^ bypoll

== Election results ==
=== 2023 ===
2023 Madhya Pradesh Legislative Assembly election: Maihar
Party	Candidate	Votes	%	±%
BJP	Shrikant Chaturvedi	76,870	38.98	▲8.81
INC	Dharmesh Ghai	55,476	28.13	▼0.4
BSP	Birendra Prasad Kushwaha	30,732	15.59	▲5.47
Vindhya Janta Party	Narayan Tripathi	22,692	11.51	
Independent	Bhagat Singh Lodhi	2,065	1.05	
NOTA	None of the above	890	0.45	▼0.74
Majority		21,394	10.85	▲9.21
Turnout		197,179	76.9	▼0.7
BJP hold		Swing		

=== 2018 ===
2018 Madhya Pradesh Legislative Assembly election: Maihar
Party	Candidate	Votes	%	±%
BJP	Narayan Tripathi	54,877	30.17	
INC	Shrikant Chaturvedi	51,893	28.53	
GGP	Manish Patel	33,397	18.36	
BSP	Nagendra Singh	18,418	10.12	
SP	Birendra Prasad Kushwaha	11,202	6.16	
AAP	Er. Pushpendra Singh	1,795	0.99	
NOTA	None of the above	2,166	1.19	
Majority		2,984	1.64	
Turnout		181,918	77.6	
BJP hold		Swing		

=== 2016 bypolls ===
Madhya Pradesh Legislative Assembly election, 2016:By Elections: Maihar
Party	Candidate	Votes	%	±%
BJP	Narayan Tripathi	82,658		
INC	Manish Patel	54,377		
Margin of victory		28,281		
Turnout				
BJP gain from INC		Swing		

== See also ==
- Maihar
- Satna Lok Sabha constituency
