= Amarpatan =

- City
- Location in Madhya Pradesh, India Amarpatan (India)
- Coordinates: 24.32°N 80.98°E
- Country: India
- State: Madhya Pradesh
- District: Maihar
- Elevation: 358 m (1,175 ft)

Population (2011)
  - Total: 19,409

Languages
  - Official: Hindi
- Time zone: UTC+5:30 (IST)
- PIN: 485775
- Telephone code: 07675
- ISO 3166 code: IN-MP
- Vehicle registration: MP-19

Amarpatan is a municipal city in Maihar district in the state of Madhya Pradesh, India.

== Geography ==
Amarpatan is located at 24.32°N 80.98°E. It has an average elevation of 358 metres (1174 feet). Multiple villages surround the city. It is on National Highway No.7 and connects Rewa to Jabalpur which is one of the busiest highway in India, various other state highways are passing through the city. It is located at right in the center of Satna district. Amarpatan has various tourist spots nearby like Mukundpur white tiger safari, Markandeya Ashram (more of Bansagar Dam), spiritual Maa sharda devi temple, Ramvan and many more. But it lacks of railways that makes the region partially undeveloped.

== History ==
There is an old Garhi in town which was built by the Maharaja Amar Singh, Maharaja of Rewa in ancient times. There is a Jagannath Swami temple inside the Garhi. Gorsari hills also called Kamoor hills which is part of Satpura range is located in this region. A holy place, Markanday Rishi Ashram is nearly 35 km in this town. Papra is also an ancient hills place which have a shape of plateau and Hanuman temple is very popular.

Amarpatan is one of the major cities in former Rewa state.

== Demographics ==
As of 2001 Indian census, Amarpatan had a population of 16,365. Males constitute 53% of the population and females 47%. 17% of the population is under 6 years of age.
