= Maihar =

Maihar Mai Ka Har
- City
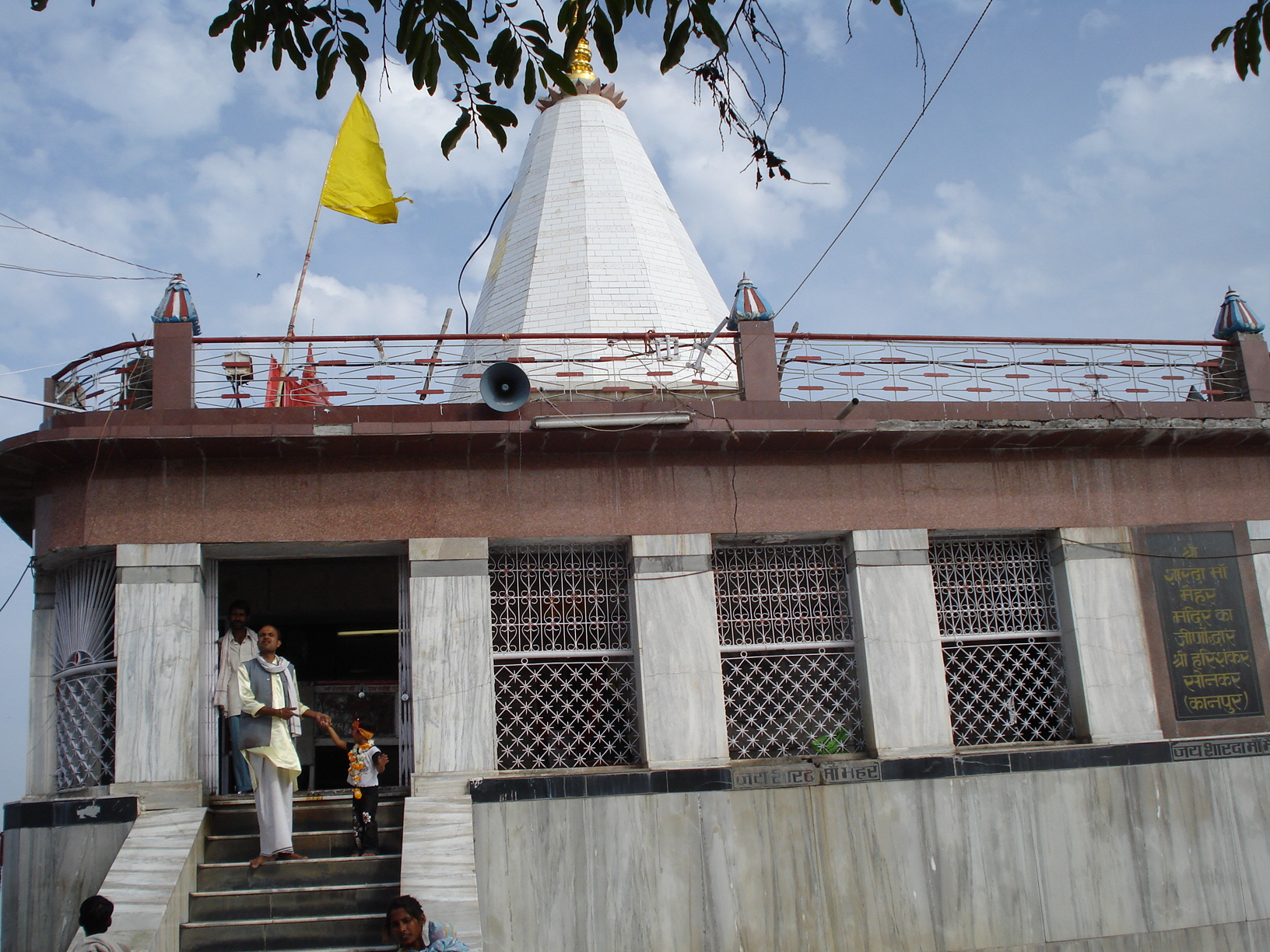
- Maa Sharda Mandir, Maihar

- Location within Madhya Pradesh Location within India
- Coordinates: 24.262°N 80.761°E
- Country: India
- State: Madhya Pradesh
- Region: Baghelkhand
- District: Maihar
- Established: 1778

Government
  - MLA: Shri Shrikant Chaturvedi ((BJP))
  - MP: Ganesh Singh (BJP)
  - Municipal Corporation: Geeta Soni (BJP)
- Elevation: 367 m (1,204 ft)

Population (2023)
  - Total: 54,000

Languages
  - Official: Hindi
  - Local: Bagheli
- Time zone: UTC+5:30 (IST)
- Pin Code: 485771
- Telephone: 07674
- Vehicle registration: MP-19
- Website: maihar.nic.in/en/

Maihar is a city in Maihar district of the Indian state of Madhya Pradesh. It is the district's administrative headquarters. Maihar is noted for the Maa Sharda Temple, one of the Shakti Peeth.

== Origin of the name ==
According to legend, when Shiva carried the body of the mother goddess (Mai in Hindi) Sati, her necklace (har ) fell at this place. Local residents believe that the warriors Alha and Udal, under the Chandel king Paramardideva, fought Prithvi Raj Chauhan and were the first to visit the goddess in the forest. They called her "Sharda Mai", and she became known as "Mata Sharda Mai". Alha worshiped her for 12 years and reached immortality with Saraswati's blessing.

== History ==
Maihar's history dates back to the Paleolithic. It was the former capital of the princely state of Maihar. The state was founded in 1778 by Jogis who were granted land by the ruler of the nearby state of Orchha. It became a princely state of British India during the early 19th century, and was administered as part of Bundelkhand in the Central India Agency. Bundelkhand's eastern states (including Maihar) were separated to form the new agency of Bagelkhand in 1871. In 1933, Maihar and ten other states in western Bagelkhand were returned to Bundelkhand. The state had an area of 407 square miles (1,050 km^{2}) and a population of 63,702 in 1901. Watered by the Tamsa River, it consists primarily of alluvial soil covering sandstone and is fertile except for the southern hills. A large area was forested, and the city experienced a severe famine in 1896–1897. Maihar became a station on the East Indian Railway (the present-day West Central Railway) line between Satna and Jabalpur, 97 miles (156 km) north of Jabalpur. Extensive ruins of shrines and other buildings surround Maihar. Maihar is part of the Satna Lok Sabha constituency with six other Vidhan Sabha constituencies: Chitrakoot, Raigaon, Satna, Amarpatan, Nagod and Rampur-Baghelan. Shrikant Chaturvedi is the MLA for the Maihar Assembly constituency.

== Attractions ==
The Maa Sharda Mandir, built c. 502 CE, is at the top of Trikut hill. The hill has 1,064 steps and a ropeway. Other temples in Maihar are the Golamath, Oila, Badi Mai, Bada Akhada and Icchapurti temples. The home of musician Allauddin Khan has been restored in his memory.

== Elevation and rainfall ==
Maihar is located at 24.27°N 80.75°E. It has an average elevation of 367 metres (1204 ft). The area receives moderate rainfall, primarily in July and August.

== Demographics ==
Maihar town is divided into 18 wards for which elections are held every 5 years. The Maihar Municipality has population of 40,192 of which 21,031 are males while 19,161 are females as per report released by Census India 2011.

The population of children aged 0-6 is 5238 which is 13.03% of total population of Maihar (M). In Maihar Municipality, the female sex ratio is 911 against state average of 931. Moreover, the child sex ratio in Maihar is around 875 compared to Madhya Pradesh state average of 918. literacy rate of Maihar city is 81.99% higher than the state average of 69.32%. In Maihar, male literacy is around 87.82% while the female literacy rate is 75.62%

=== Religion ===
Hinduism is the majority religion in Maihar, accounting for about 81%. Jainism accounts for 17%, and there are also a small number of Others (approximately 0.23%).

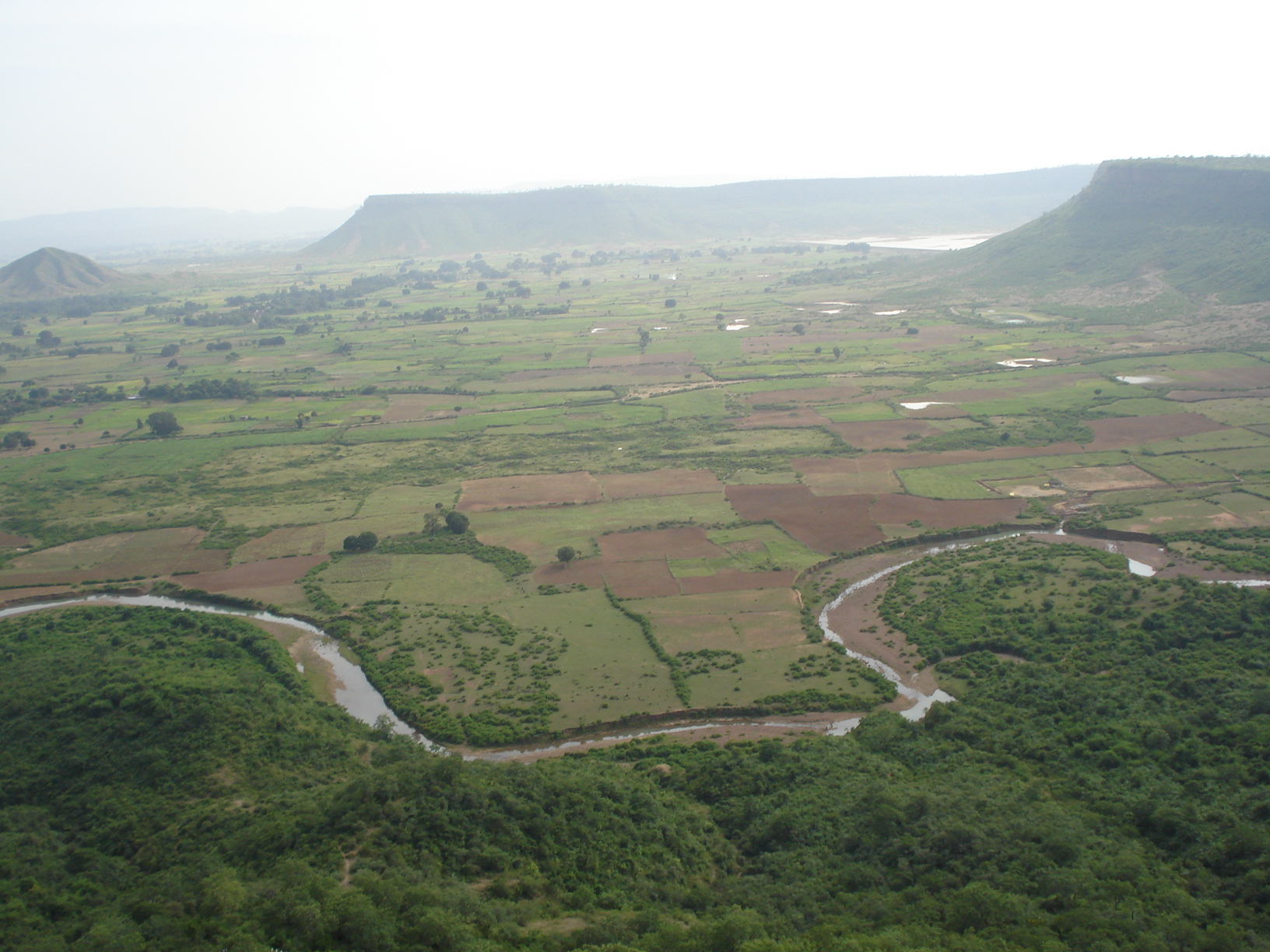
View from the Maa Sharda temple

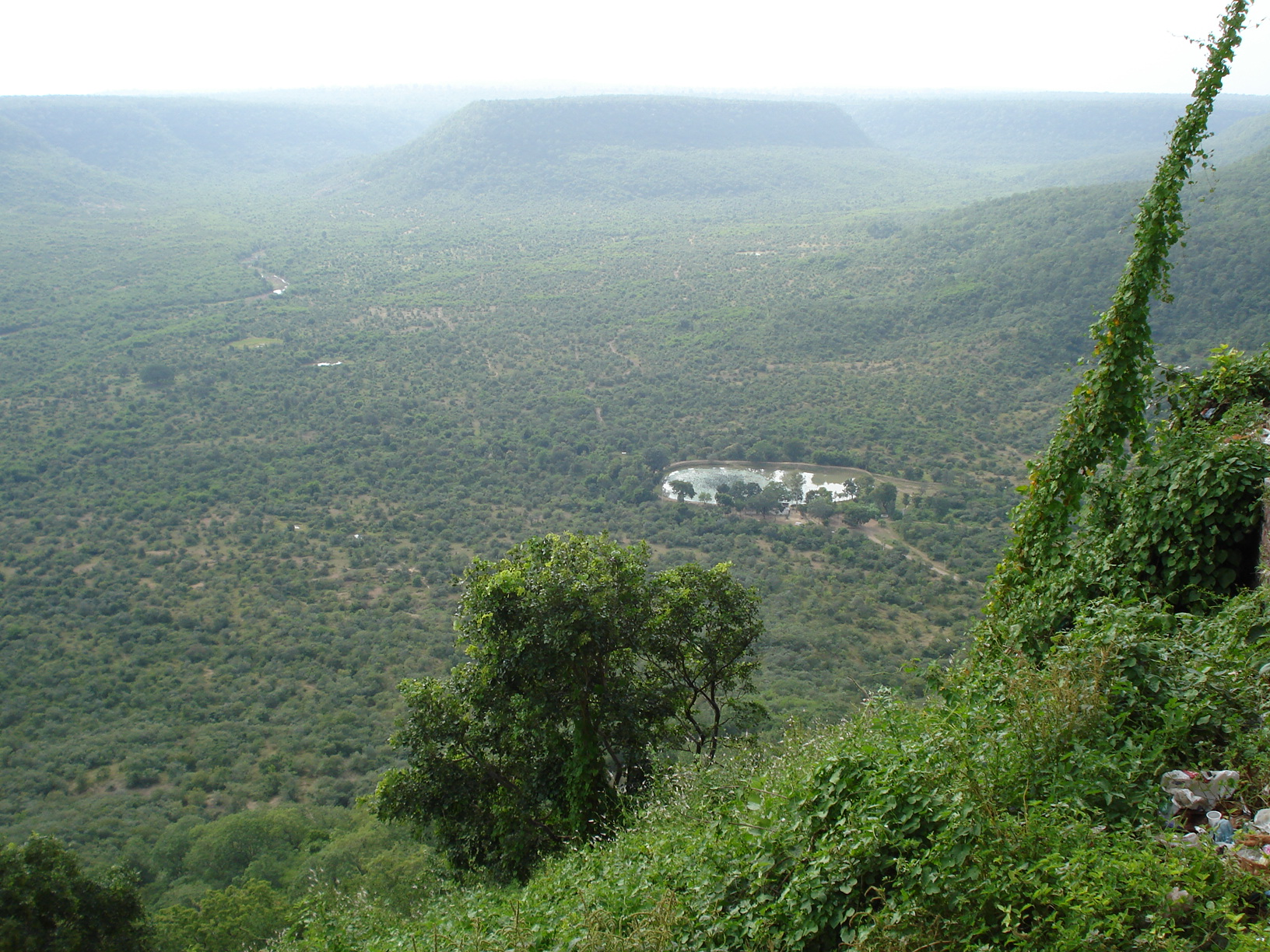
View of the pond from the temple

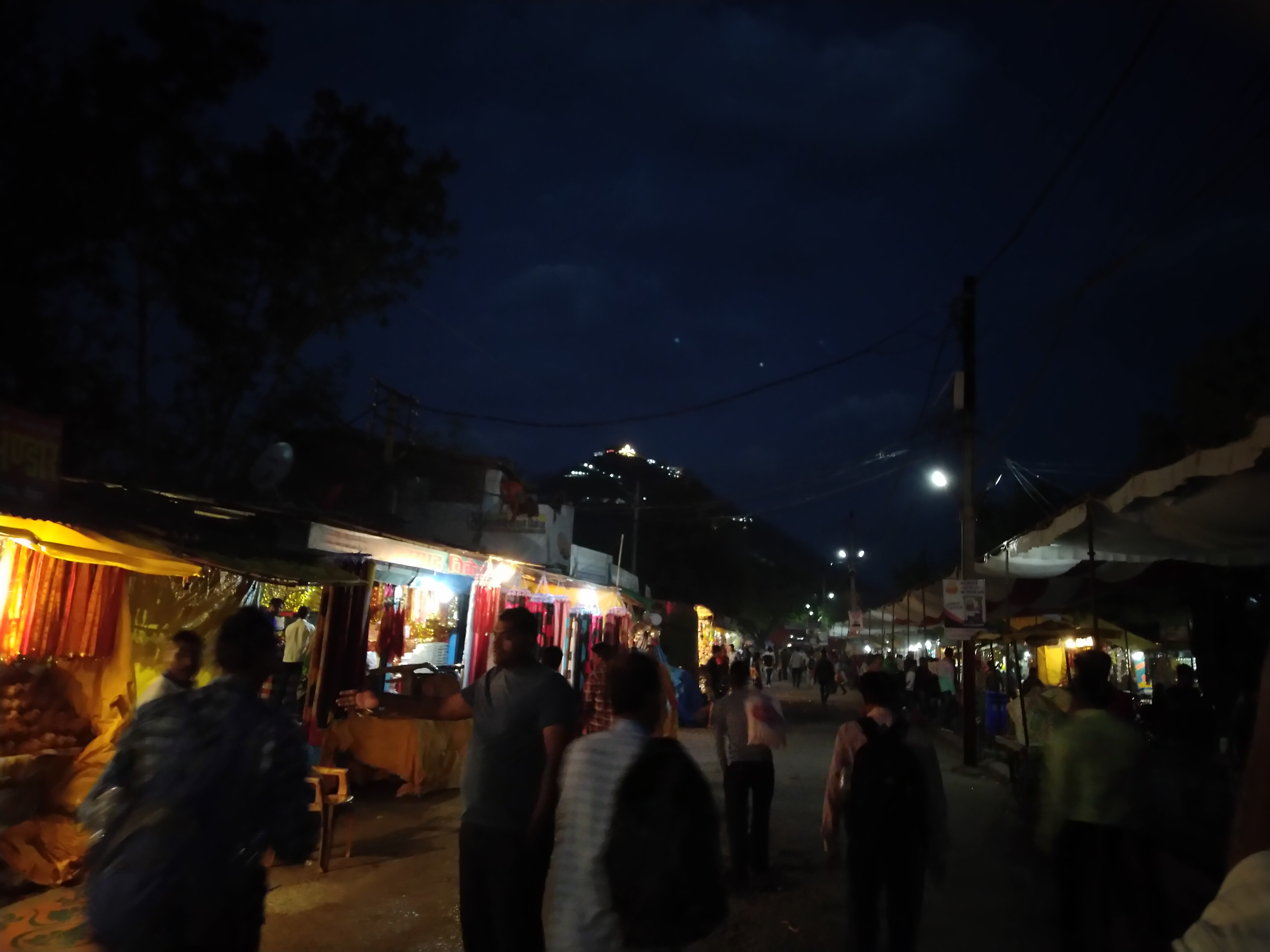
Night view of the Maa Sharda Mandir from a local market in 2019

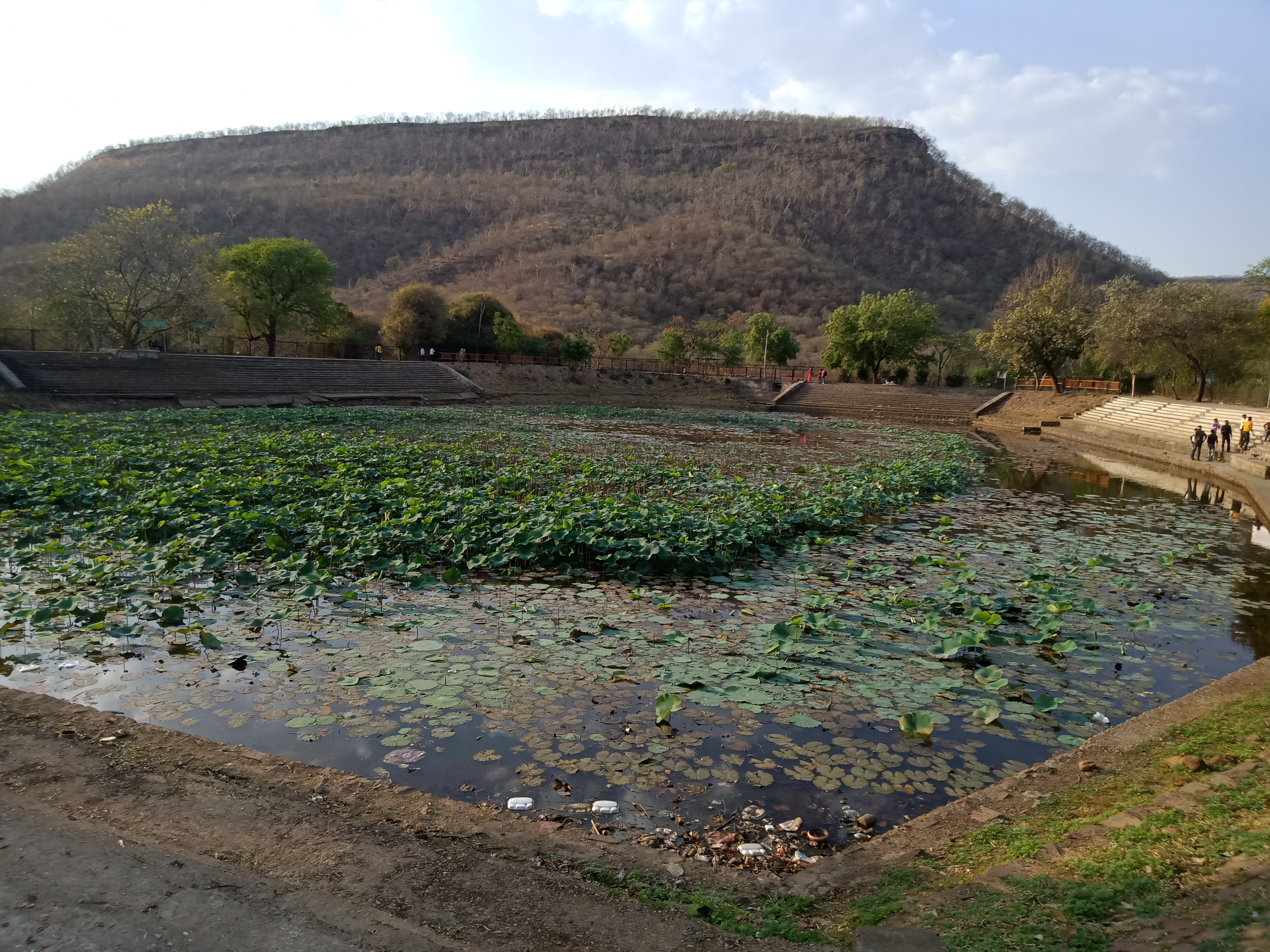
Pond of Alha and Udal, near the Maa Sharda temple

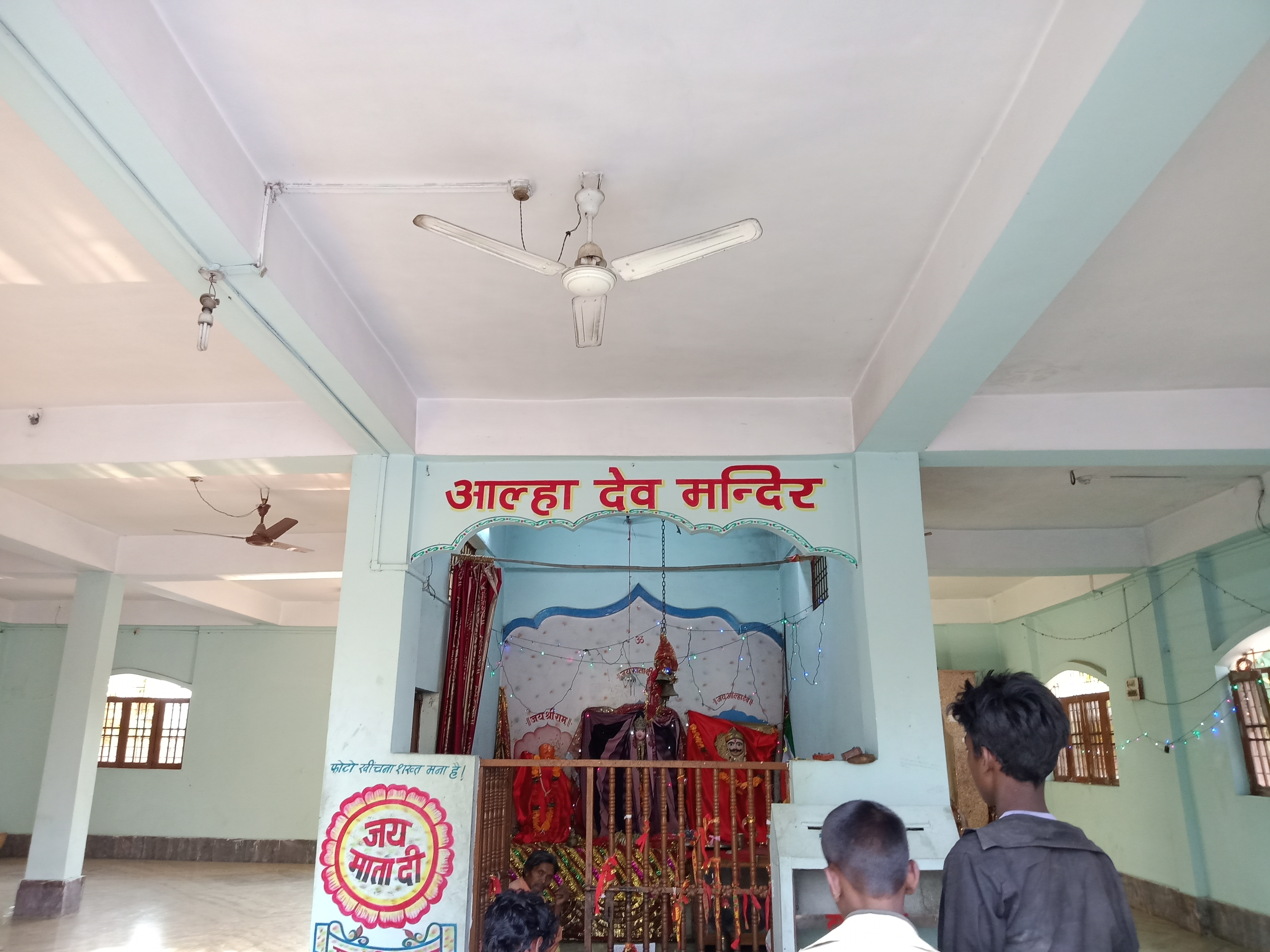
The Alha Dev temple, near the Maa Sharda temple

== Education ==
Maihar has several educational institutions catering to higher and secondary education. Prominent colleges in the town include the Government Swami Vivekanand College, which offers undergraduate and postgraduate courses affiliated with Awadhesh Pratap Singh University, Rewa.

- DESIGNATION : DISTRICT EDUCATION OFFICER

District Education Department is responsible for Administrative, Financial, Academic and Inspection related matters of School Education department.Under District Education Officer, Block Education Officers are working in Rewa, where Block Education Officers are responsible for activities related to School Education.

== Notable people ==
Allauddin Khan : Indian sarod player, multi-instrumentalist, composer and one of the most notable music teachers of the 20th century in Indian classical music.

Annapurna Devi : Indian surbahar player of Hindustani classical music and music teacher.

== Transport ==
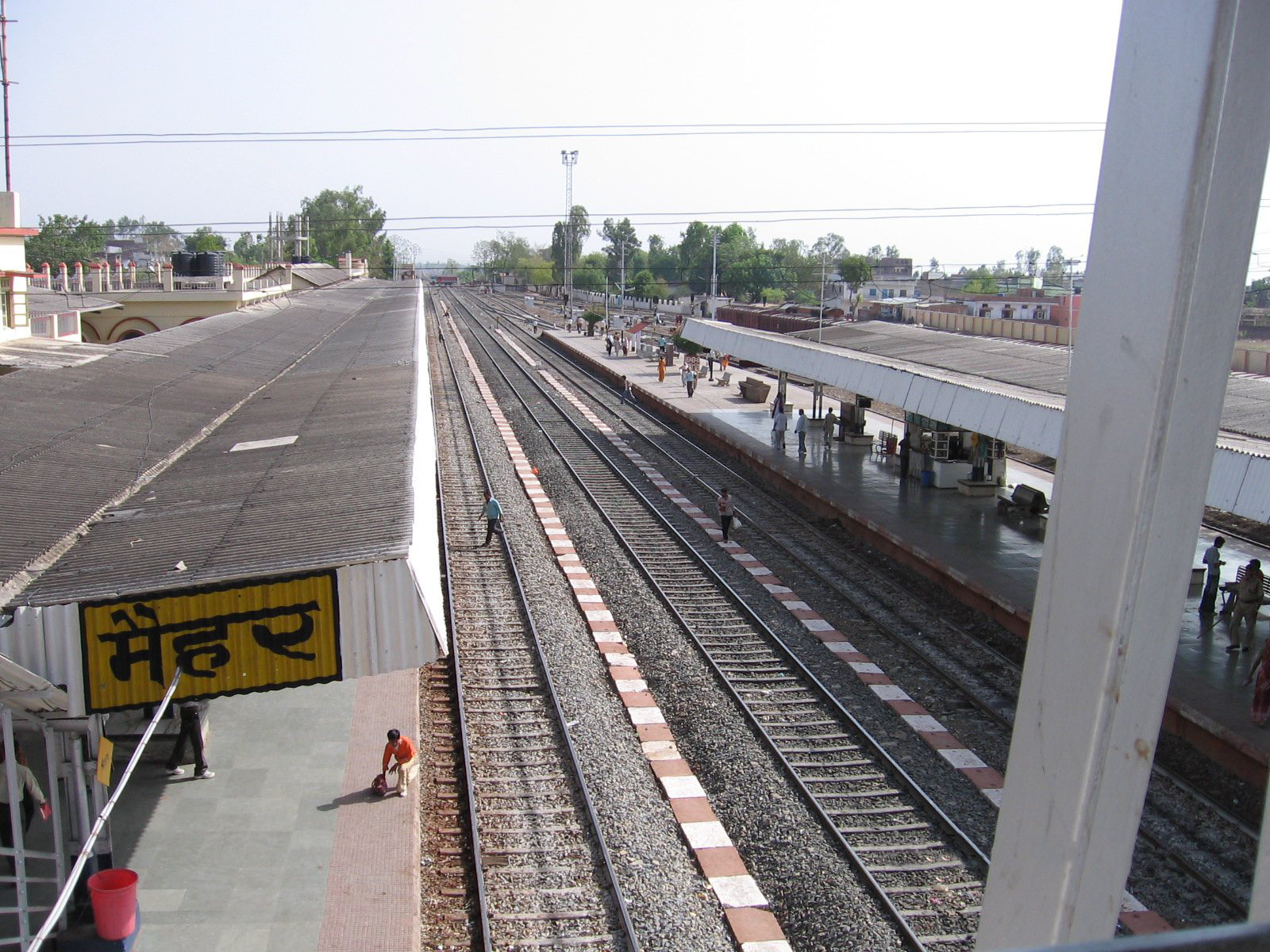
The Maihar railway station in 2009

Maihar is connected to National Highway 7. The Mahakoshal Express provides a direct connection from Delhi's Hazrat Nizamuddin station. Maihar railway station is between the West Central Railway's Katni and Satna stations. Many pilgrims attend the Nav Ratra festivals. The nearest airport is Satna Airport and bus service is available in the city.

The town is served by the Maihar railway station (station code: MYR), situated on the Howrah–Allahabad–Mumbai line under the Jabalpur railway division of the West Central Railway zone. The station experiences significant passenger traffic from pilgrims traveling to the Maa Sharda Temple and connects the city directly to regional hubs such as Satna, Katni, and Jabalpur.

== Music ==
Maihar is noted in Indian classical music as the birthplace of the Maihar gharana, a gharana (school or style) of Hindustani music. Allauddin Khan (d. 1972) lived in Maihar for many years and was the court musician in Maihar Raja's palace. His students popularised the gharana during the 20th century, and included Ravi Shankar and Nikhil Banerjee. The first Ustad Allauddin Khan music conference was hosted by Shri Deep Chand Jain in 1962.
