= Maihar district =

District of Madhya Pradesh in India

- District of Madhya Pradesh
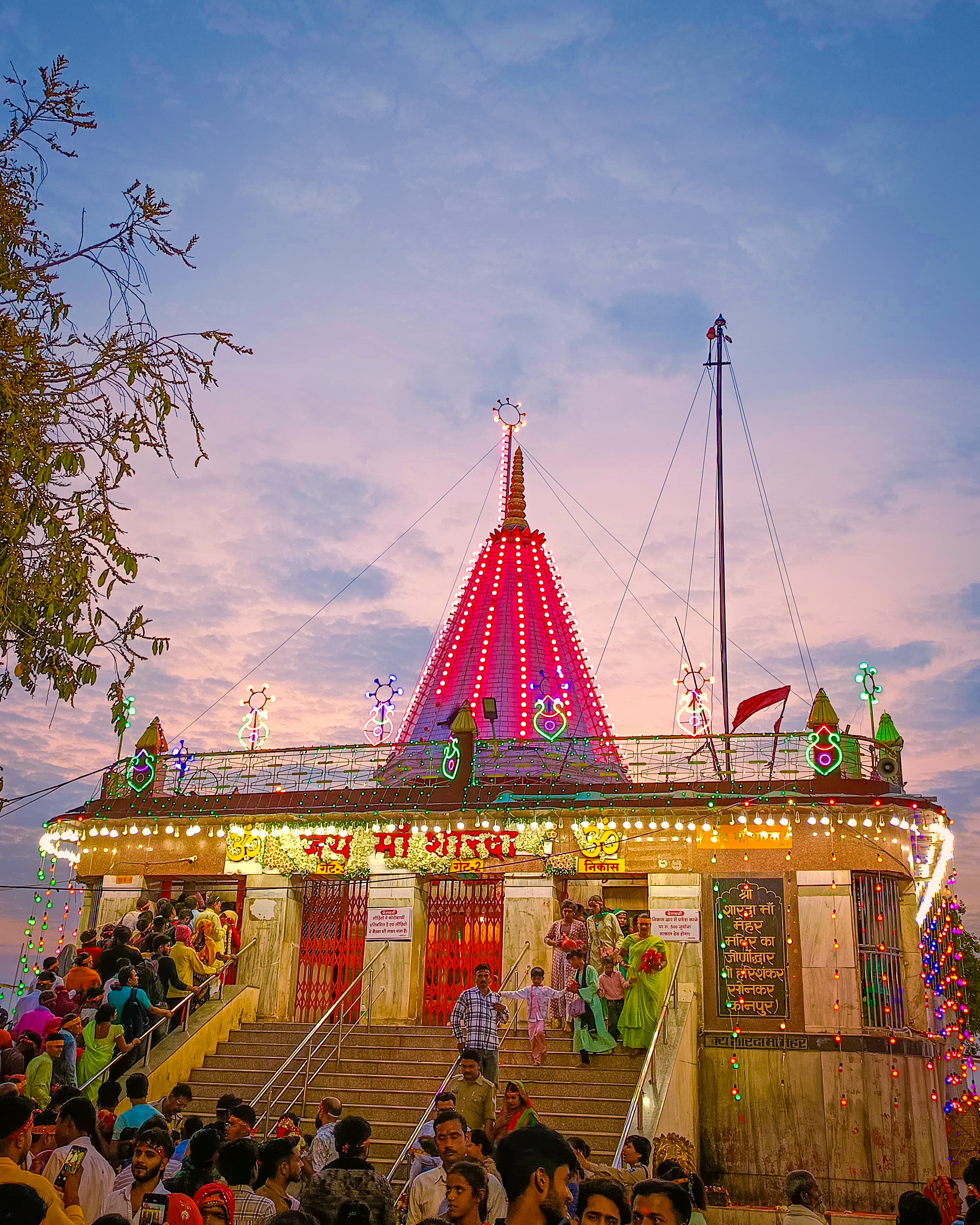
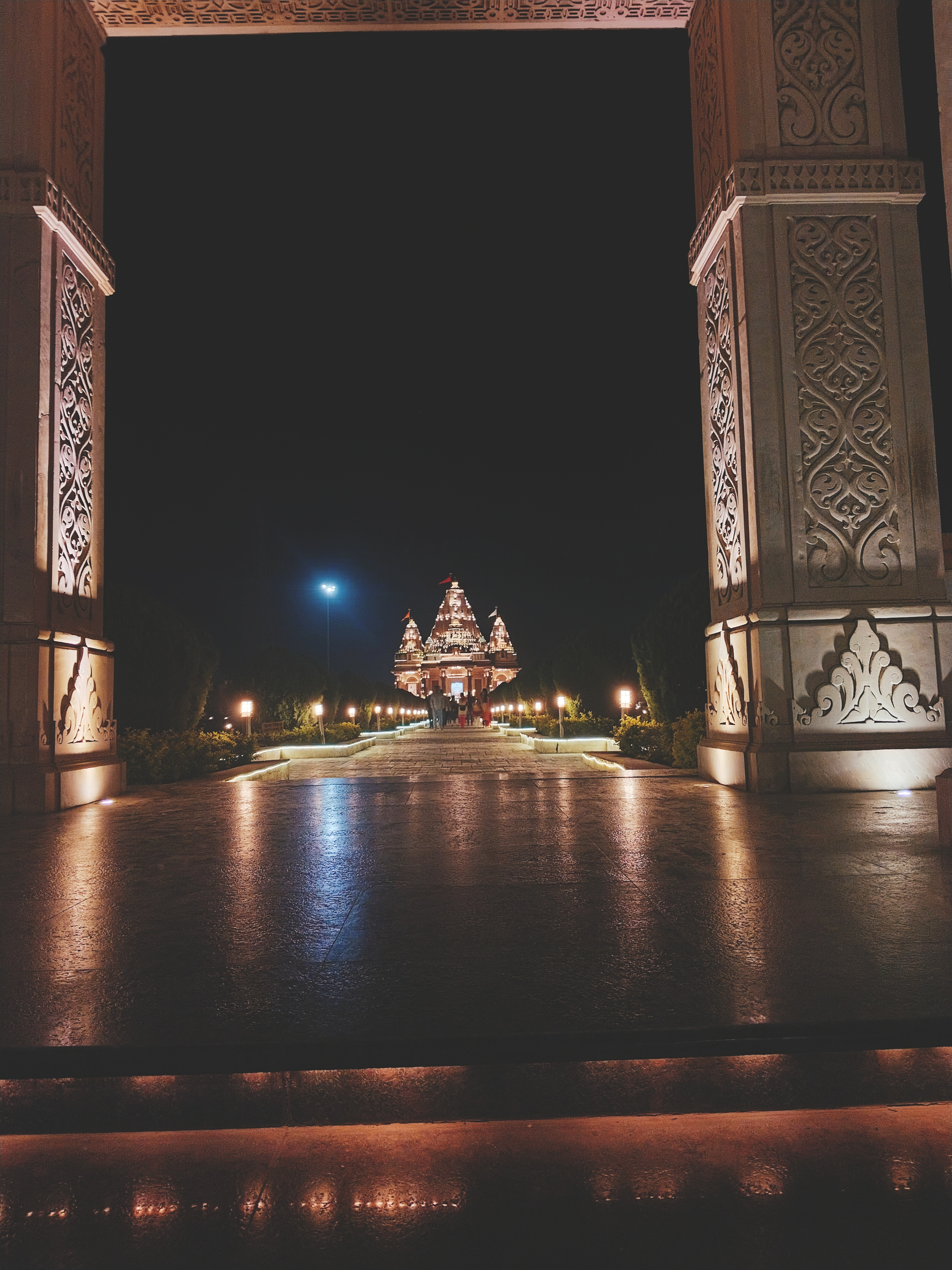
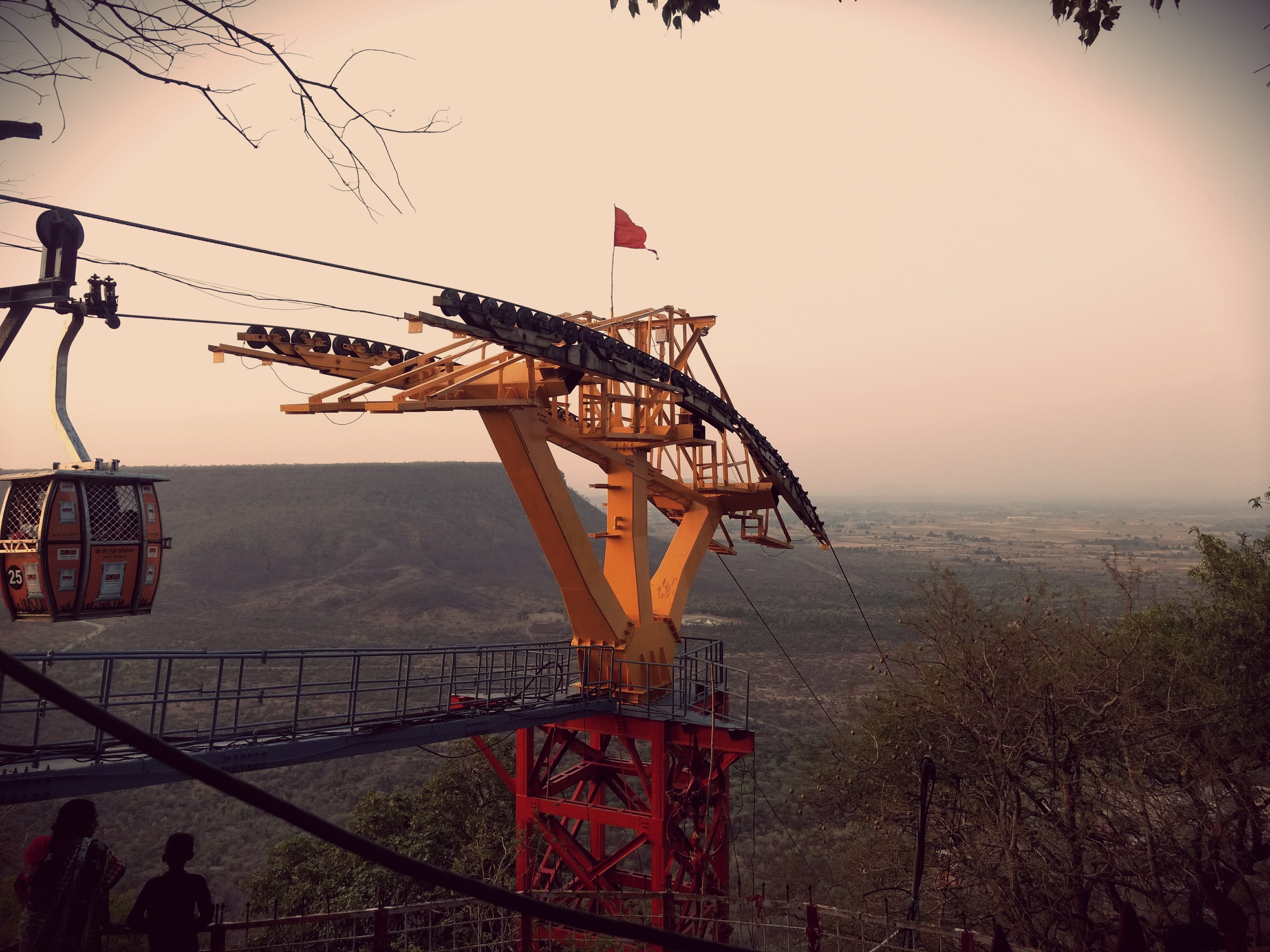
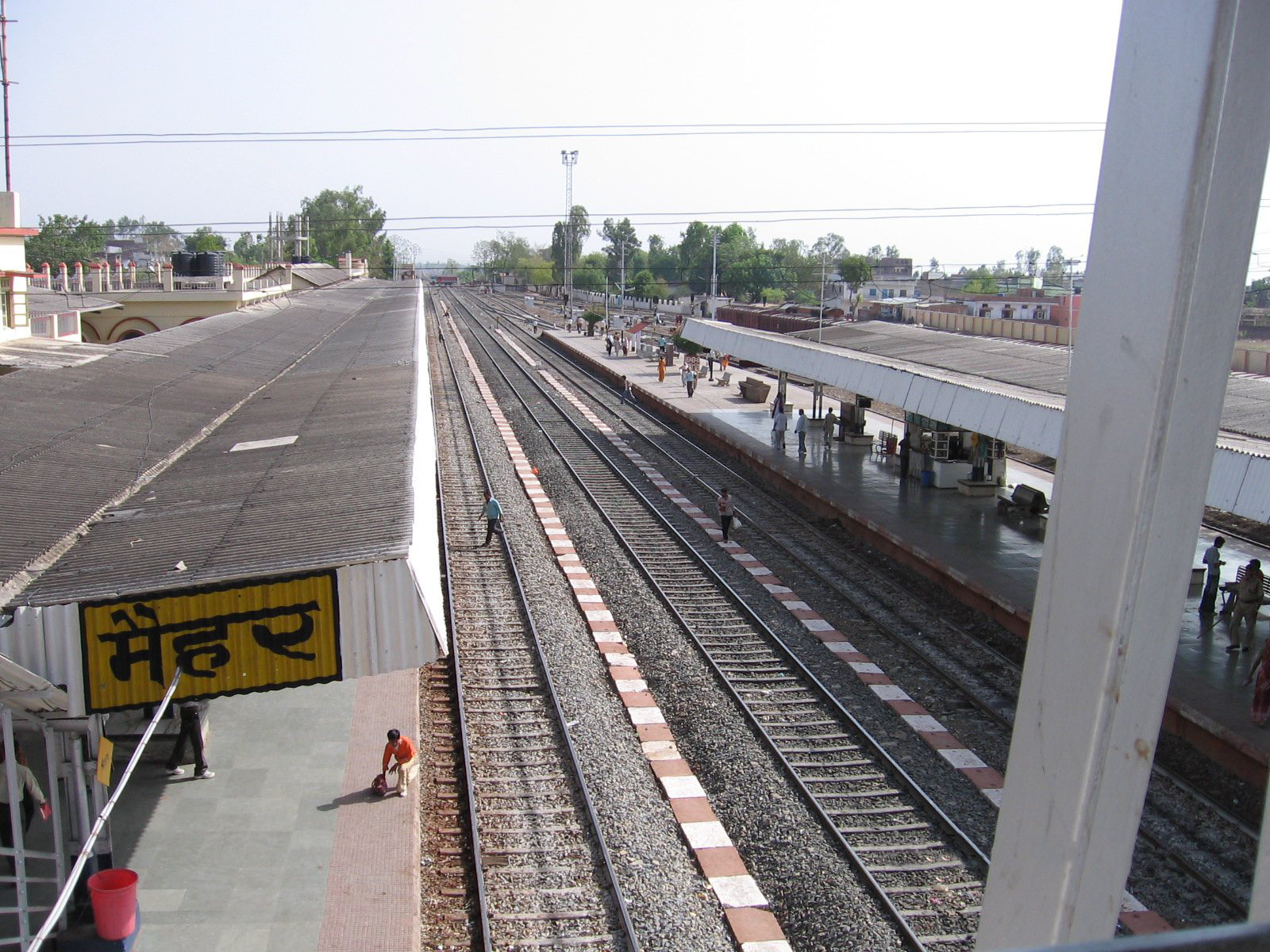
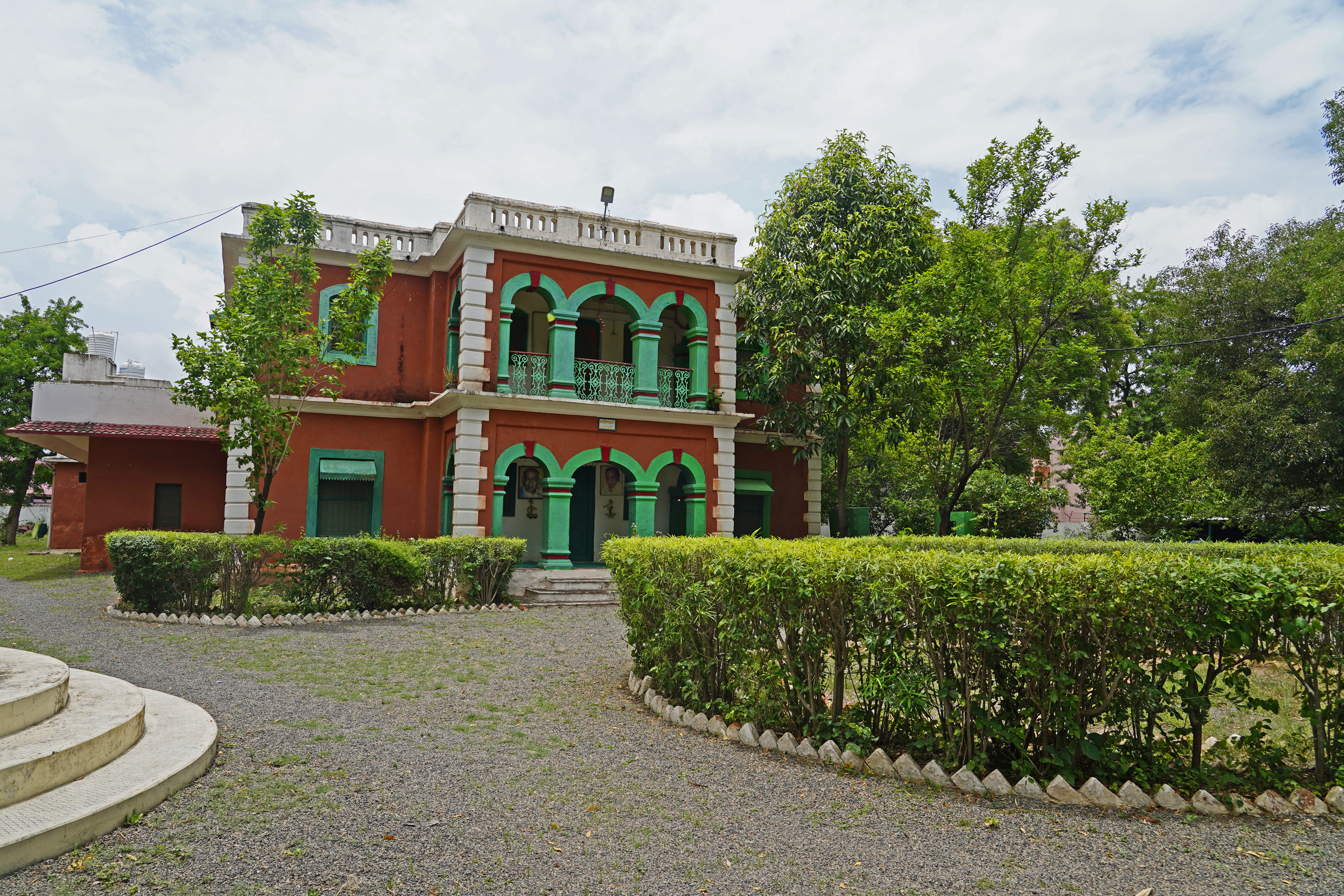
- Maa Sharda Temple KJS Icchapurti Temple Sharda Temple Ropeway Maihar railway station Ustad Allauddin Khan's residence (Shanti Kutir)

- Coordinates: 21°59′N 78°52′E
- Country: India
- State: Madhya Pradesh
- Division: Rewa Division
- Established: 5 October 2023
- Headquarters: Maihar
- Tehsils: 1. Maihar; 2. Amarpatan; 3. Ramnagar; 4. Amdara(Proposed)

Government
  - District collector: Mrs. Bidisha Mukherjee (IAS)
  - Lok Sabha constituencies: 1. Satna (shared with Satna district)
  - Vidhan Sabha constituencies: 2 (Maihar and Amarpatan)

Area
  - Total: 2,722.79 km^{2} (1,051.28 sq mi)

Population (2011)
  - Total: 856,028
  - Density: 314.394/km^{2} (814.276/sq mi)

Demographics

Languages
  - Official: Hindi and Bagheli
- Time zone: UTC+05:30 (IST)
- Website: Maihar.nic.in

Maihar district (Hindi pronunciation: [mɛːɦəɾ]) is one of the 55 districts in Madhya Pradesh, India. Maihar city is the administrative headquarter of the Maihar district. The district was carved out from the existing Satna district on 5 October 2023 and was announced by then Chief Minister Shivraj Singh Chouhan.

Maihar District has three tehsils: Maihar, Amarpatan and Ramnagar. This district is famous for its cement factories and Ma Sharda Devi Mandir.

== History ==
Maihar State was a princely state in India during the British Raj, located in what is today Madhya Pradesh, central India. The state had an area of 1,050 square kilometres (407 sq mi), and a population of 63,702 in 1901. The state, which was watered by the Tons River, consists mainly of alluvial soil covering sandstone, and is fertile except in the hilly district of the south. A large area was under forest, the produce of which provided a small export trade.

== Geographics ==
Maihar District belongs to Rewa Division. It is the sixth district of Rewa Division. It shares its boundaries with Rewa, Katni, Shahdol, Sidhi, Satna, Umaria and Panna districts. It Has a Total geographical area of 2722.79 sq km, Tamsa River(Tons) is a major river of the district. Maihar, Amarpatan, Ramnagar, Amdara and Badera is Major town of the district.

== Economy ==
The economy of the district is mainly dependent on agriculture. Wheat, Gram, Tomato and Bittergourd are mainly produced in the district. There are also three major cement factories namely KJS Cement, Ultratech (Formerly Maihar) Cement and Birala corporation's Perfect Cement, making it a Cement hub of the state. Limestone is also produced largely in the district.

== Government ==
Maihar district has two assembly constituencies Maihar and Amarpatan Assembly constituency. Both are also a part of Satna Lok Sabha constituency.

== Demographics ==
Religions in Maihar district (2011)
Religion	Percent
Hinduism	96.87%
Islam	2.65%
Other or not stated	0.48%

At the time of the 2011 census, what is currently Maihar district had a population of 742,901, of which 361,152 were females. 59,601 (8.02%) lived in urban areas. Scheduled Castes and Scheduled Tribes made up 114,083 (15.36%) and 141,215 (19.01%) of the population respectively.

Languages of Maihar district (2011)
1. Hindi (67.0%)
2. Bagheli (32.4%)
3. Others (0.65%)

Bagheli is the local language, but 66.99% of the population recorded their language as Hindi and 32.36% Bagheli as their first language.

== Notable people ==
- Allauddin Khan, an Indian sarod player and multi-instrumentalist, composer
- Rajendra Kumar Singh, Indian Politician

== Tourist places ==
- Sharda Devi Temple,
- Mukundpur White Tiger Safari & Zoo,
- Alha ka Akhada,
- Alha Dev Temple,
- Art Ichol
- Kjs Temple
- Panni Khoh Waterfall
- Maihar Mandir Ropeway

== Transportation ==
- By Air

There is no airport at Maihar. The nearest airports are Satna(42 km) Prayagraj (220 km), Varanasi, Khajuraho and Jabalpur(154 km). Satna Airport is the nearest airport, which is connected to most cities in India.

- By Rail

Maihar district is connected to various cities of the country by rail route.

- By Road

Maihar Bus Stand is located in the center of the city where there is frequent availability of buses to Prayagraj, Rewa, Panna, Chhatarpur, Katni, Satna and Indore, Bhopal, Nagpur.

== See also ==
- Maihar
- Maihar Assembly constituency
- Maihar railway station
- Amdara
