= Shrikant Chaturvedi =

Indian politician

Shrikant Chaturvedi is an Indian politician of the Bharatiya Janata Party, currently a Member of the Madhya Pradesh Legislative Assembly for Maihar Assembly constituency since the 2023 Madhya Pradesh Legislative Assembly election.
