= Flora and fauna of Madhya Pradesh =

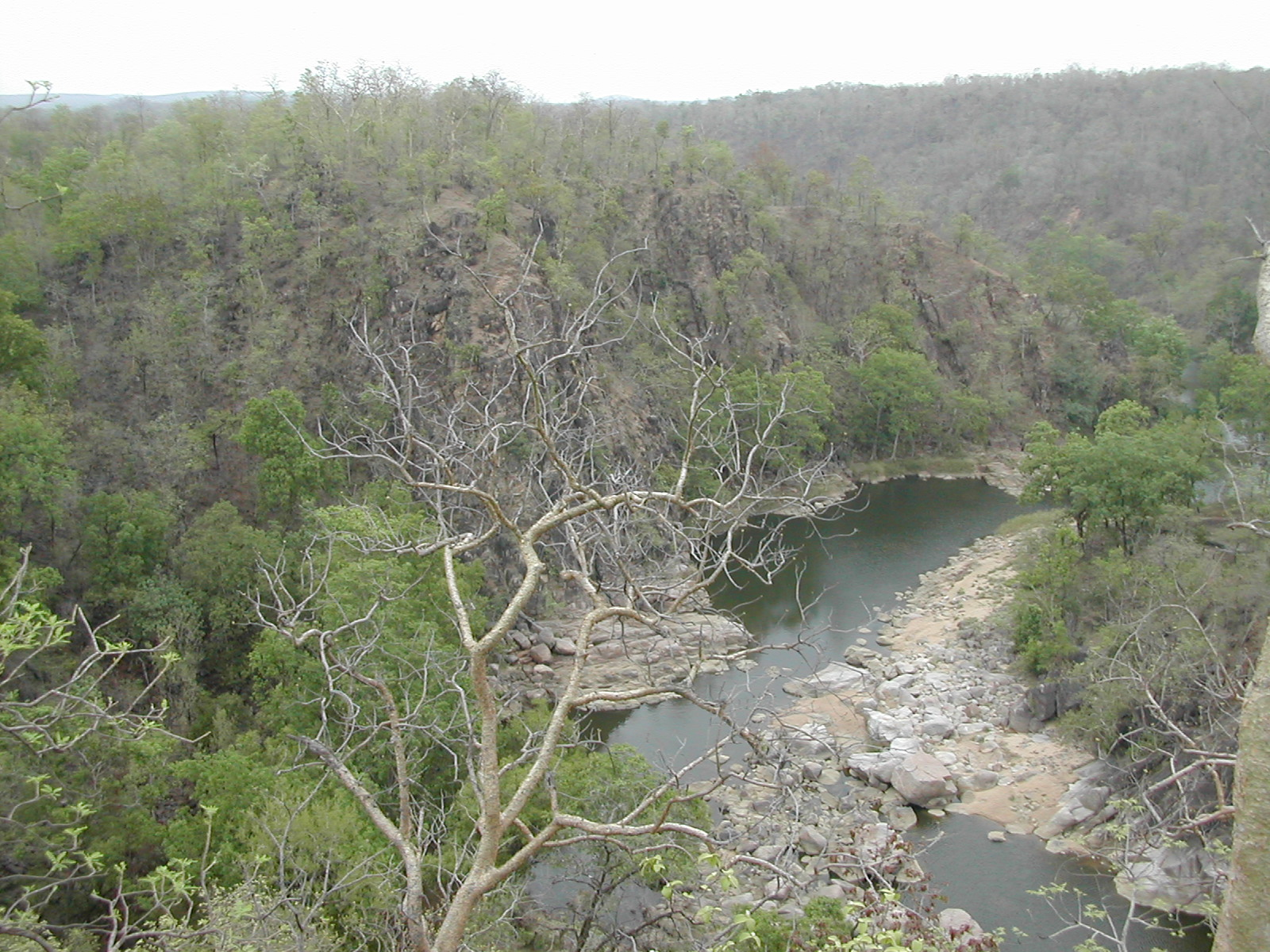
Forest in Madhya Pradesh

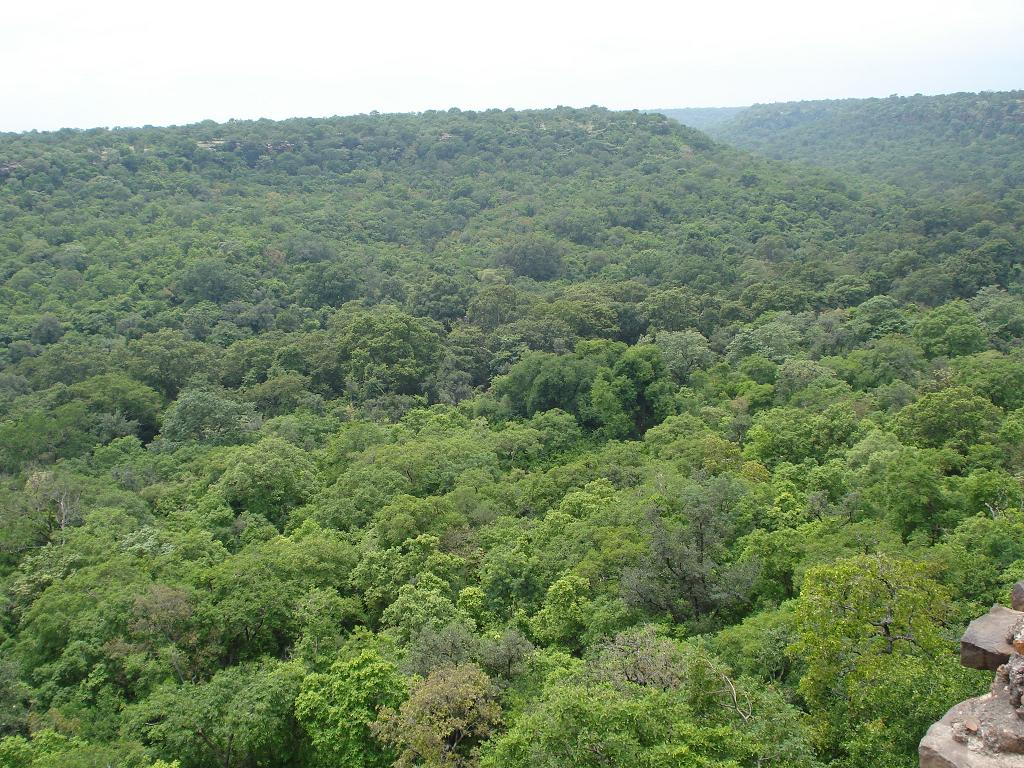
Hinglaj Fort surrounded by deep mixed forests in Mandsaur

Madhya Pradesh, often called the "Heart of India", is a state in central India. Its capital is Bhopal. Madhya Pradesh was the largest state in India until 1 November 2000 when the state of Chhattisgarh was carved out. It borders the states of Uttar Pradesh, Chhattisgarh, Maharashtra, Gujarat and Rajasthan.

== Forest composition ==
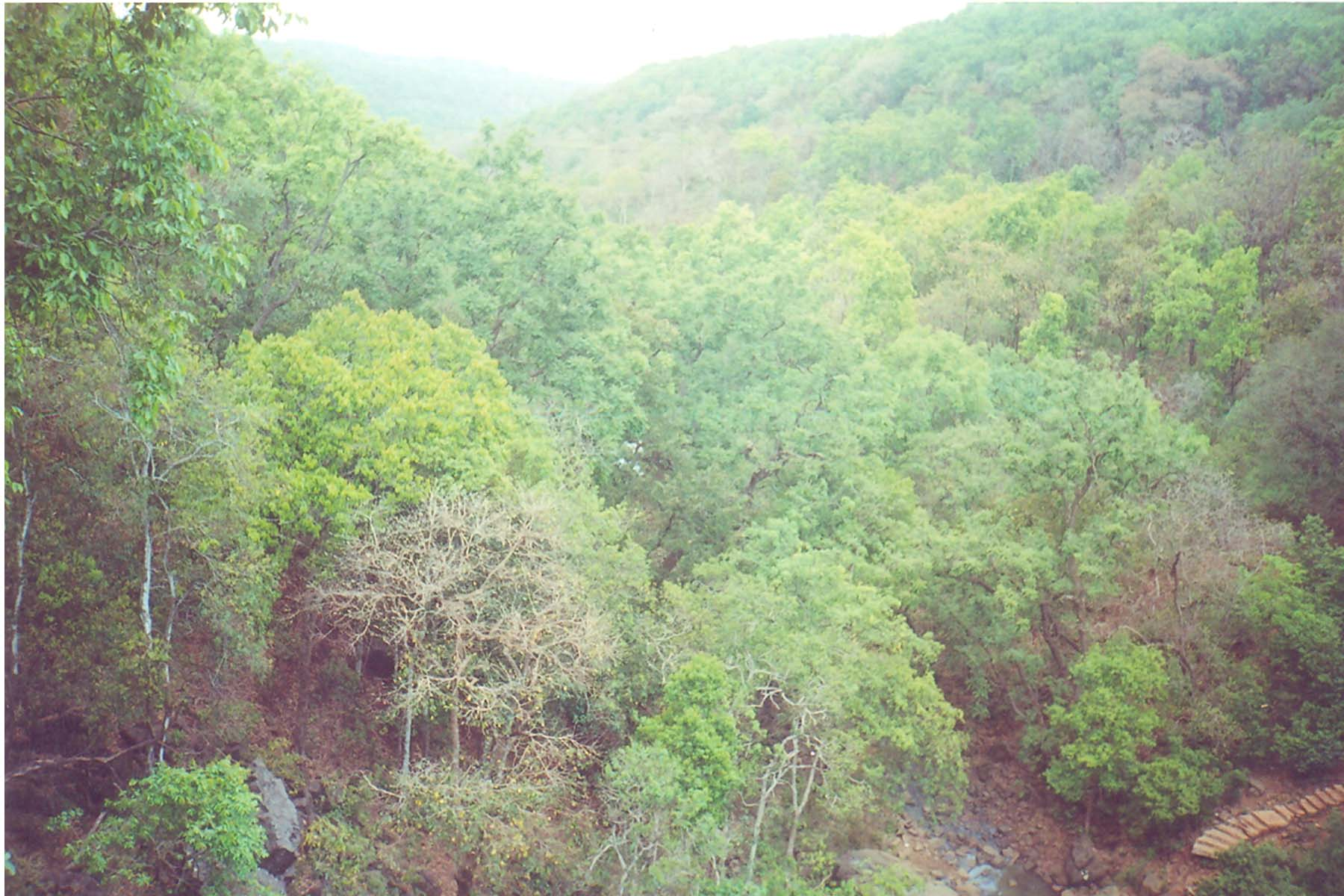
Mixed forests at Amarkantak

Sal, bamboo, khair.

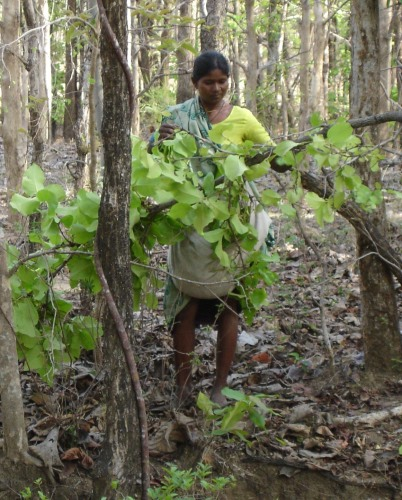
Tendu patta (leaf) collection

=== Medicinal plants ===
Medicinal trees and plants are found in the forests of Madhya Pradesh. Important ones are: Aegle marmelos, Azadirachta indica, Bixa orellana, Butea monosperma, Asparagus racemosus, Argemone mexicana, Buchanania lanzan, Aloe barbadensis, Acorus calamus, Cassia tora, Curculigo orchioides, Curcuma longa, Embelia ribes, Clitoria ternatea, Mangifera indica, Cassia fistula, Evolvulus alsinoides, Commiphora mukul, Helicteres isora, Holorrhaena antidysenterica, Glycyrrhiza glabra, Woodfordia fruticosa,. Dioscorea spp, Plumbago zeylaniea, Terminalia bellirica, Tamarindus indica, Mucuna pruriens, Pongamia pinnata, Terminalia bellirica, Psoralea corylifolia, Phyllanthus embilica, Ocimum americanum, Rauvolfia serpentina, Tinospora cardifolio, Withania somnifera, Swertia chirayita, Tribulus terrestres, Chlorophytum tuberosum, and Cyprus rotundus.

== Forest growing stock ==
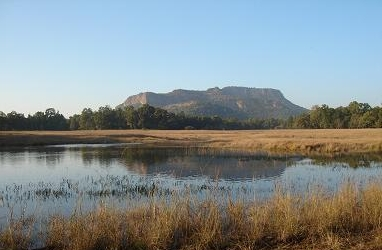
Bandhavgarh National Park

The total growing stock (volume of timber / wood) is 50,000,000 m^{3} valued worth Rs 2.5 lakh crores

== Protected areas ==
Madhya Pradesh is home to 11 national parks, including Bandhavgarh National Park, Kanha National Park, Satpura National Park, Sanjay National Park, Madhav National Park, Van Vihar National Park, Mandla Plant Fossils National Park, Panna National Park, Pench National Park, Kuno National Park and dinosaur fossil National Park Madhya Pradesh.

There are also a number of natural preserves, including Achanakmar-Amarkantak Biosphere Reserve, Patalkot, Bagh Caves, Bhedaghat, Bori Wildlife Sanctuary, Ken Gharial Sanctuary, Ghatigaon Wildlife Sanctuary, Kuno-Palpur Wildlife Sanctuary, Narwar, National Chambal Sanctuary, Kukdeshwar, Chidi Kho, Narsinghgarh, Nauradehi Wildlife Sanctuary, Pachmarhi Biosphere Reserve, Panpatha, Shikarganj, and Tamia.

== National parks and their fauna ==
There are 11 national parks and 24 sanctuaries spread over an area of 94,3489 km^{2} constituting 12.27% of the total forest area and 3.52% of the geographical area of the state.

- Kanha, Bandhavgarh, Pench, Panna, and Satpura National Park are managed as Project Tiger areas.
- Sardarpur sanctuary in Dhar and Sailana are managed for conservation of kharmore or lesser florican.
- Ghatigaon sanctuary is managed for great Indian bustard or son chiriya.
- National Chambal Sanctuary is managed for conservation of gharial and crocodile, river dolphin, smooth-coated otter and a number of turtle species.
- Ken-gharial and Son-gharial sanctuaries are managed for conservation of gharial and mugger.
- Barasingha is the state animal and dudhraj is the state bird of Madhya Pradesh.

Name of national park	Area	Location	Established	Fauna
Kanha National Park	940 km^{2}	Mandla	1955	Tiger, panther, gaur, chital, sambar, nilgai, chinkara, barking deer, swamp deer, (barasingha), wild boar and a variety of upland birds.
Bandhavgarh National Park	437 km^{2}	Umaria	1968	Tiger, panther, gaur, chital, sambar, nilgai, chinkara, barking deer, wild boar and a variety of upland birds.
Madhav National Park	354 km^{2}	Shivpuri	1959	Panther, chital, sambar, nilgai, chinkara, blackbuck, chausingha, wild boar, crocodiles in lake, and a variety of upland birds.
Sanjay National Park	467 km^{2}	Sidhi	1981	Tiger, panther, sambar, chital, gaur, etc.
Van Vihar National Park	4.45 km^{2}	Bhopal	1983	Tiger, panther, lion, bear, hyena, etc.
Panna National Park	543 km^{2}	Panna, Chhatarpur	1981	Tiger, chital, chinkara, sambar and sloth bear.
Satpura National Park	524 km^{2}	Pachmarhi	1981	Tiger, leopard, sambar, chital, bherki, nilgai, four-horned antelope, chinkara, bison (gour), wild boar, wild dog, bear, blackbuck, fox, porcupine, flying squirrel, mouse deer, Indian giant squirrel, etc.
Pench National Park	293 km^{2}	Seoni, Chhindwara	1975	Tiger, panther, bison, chital, sambhar, nilgai, chinkara, barking deer, chowsingha, wild boar and a variety of upland birds.
Ghughua Fossil National Park	0.27 km^{2}	Dindori	1983	Plant fossils
Dinosaur Fossils National Park	0.89 km^{2}	Dhar	2011	
Kuno National Park	748.76 km^{2}	Sheopur	2018	
Omkareshwar National Park				

== List of sanctuaries ==
There are 30 wildlife sanctuaries in Madhya Pradesh:

- Bori Wildlife Sanctuary (Narmadapuram) 518.00 km^{2} (200.00 sq mi)
- Bagdara Wildlife Sanctuary (Singrauli) 478.90 km^{2} (184.90 sq mi)
- Phen Sanctuary (Mandla) 110.74 km^{2} (42.76 sq mi)
- Ghatigaon Sanctuary (Gwalior) 512.00 km^{2} (197.68 sq mi)
- Gandhi Sagar Sanctuary (Mandsaur, Neemuch) 368.62 km^{2} (142.32 sq mi)
- Karera Sanctuary (Shivpuri) 202.21 km^{2} (78.07 sq mi)
- Ken Gharial Sanctuary (Chhatarpur, Panna) 45.00 km^{2} (17.37 sq mi)
- Kheoni Wildlife Sanctuary (Dewas, Sehore) 122.70 km^{2} (47.37 sq mi)
- Narsingharh Sanctuary (Rajgarh) 57.19 km^{2} (22.08 sq mi)
- National Chambal Sanctuary (Morena) 320.00 km^{2} (123.55 sq mi)
- Nauradehi Wildlife Sanctuary (Sagar, Damoh, Narsinghpur) 1,194.67 km^{2} (461.26 sq mi)
- Pachmarhi Sanctuary (Narmadapuram) 461.85 km^{2} (178.32 sq mi)
- Panpatha Wildlife Sanctuary (Umaria) 245.84 km^{2} (94.92 sq mi)
- Kuno Wildlife Sanctuary (Sheopur) 345.00 km^{2} (133.21 sq mi)
- Pench National Park (Seoni) 449.39 km^{2} (173.51 sq mi)
- Ratapani Tiger Reserve (Raisen, Sehore) 823.84 km^{2} (318.09 sq mi)
- Sanjay-Dubri Wildlife Sanctuary (Sidhi) 364.69 km^{2} (140.81 sq mi)
- Singhori Sanctuary (Raisen) 287.91 km^{2} (111.16 sq mi)
- Son Gharial Wildlife Sanctuary (Sidhi) 41.80 km^{2} (16.14 sq mi)
- Sardarpur Sanctuary (Dhar) 348.12 km^{2} (134.41 sq mi)
- Sailana Sanctuary (Ratlam) 12.96 km^{2} (5.00 sq mi)
- Ralamandal wildlife Sanctuary (Indore) 5 km^{2} (1.9 sq mi)
- Orchha Wildlife Sanctuary (Niwari) 46 km^{2} (18 sq mi)
- Gangau Sanctuary (Panna) 69 km^{2} (27 sq mi)
- Veerangna Durgawati Sanctuary (Damoh) 24 km^{2} (9.3 sq mi)

== Climate ==
Madhya Pradesh has a subtropical climate. Like most of north India, it has a hot, dry summer (April–June) followed by the monsoon rains (July–September), and a cool and relatively dry winter. The average rainfall is about 1,370 mm (53.9 in). It decreases from east to west. The south-eastern districts have the heaviest rainfall, some places receiving as much as 2,150 mm (84.6 in), while the western and north-western districts receive 1,000 mm (39.4 in) or less.

== Tribals and forests ==
The tribal population is an integral part of the biodiversity of the forests since ages. A large number of ethnic aboriginal tribes are there who live in and around forests in Madhya Pradesh. The main tribal groups are:

- Bhils
  - Barelas
  - Bhilalas
  - Patliya
- Korku
  - Movasiruma
  - Nahala
  - Vavari
  - Bodoya
- Agaria
- Baiga
  - Bijhwar
  - Narotia
  - Bharotiya
  - Nahar
  - Rai Bhaina
  - Kadh Bhaina
- Kaul
  - Rohiya
  - Rauthail
- Saharia
- Bharia
  - Bhumiya
  - Bhuihar
  - Pando
- Gond
  - Pardhan
  - Agariya
  - Ojha
  - Nagarchi
  - Solhas
- Halba
  - Halbi
  - Bastariya
  - Chhatisgarhiya
- Mariya
  - Abujh Mariya,
  - Dandami Mariya,
  - Metakoitur

== See also ==
- Flora of Madhya Pradesh

== Gallery ==
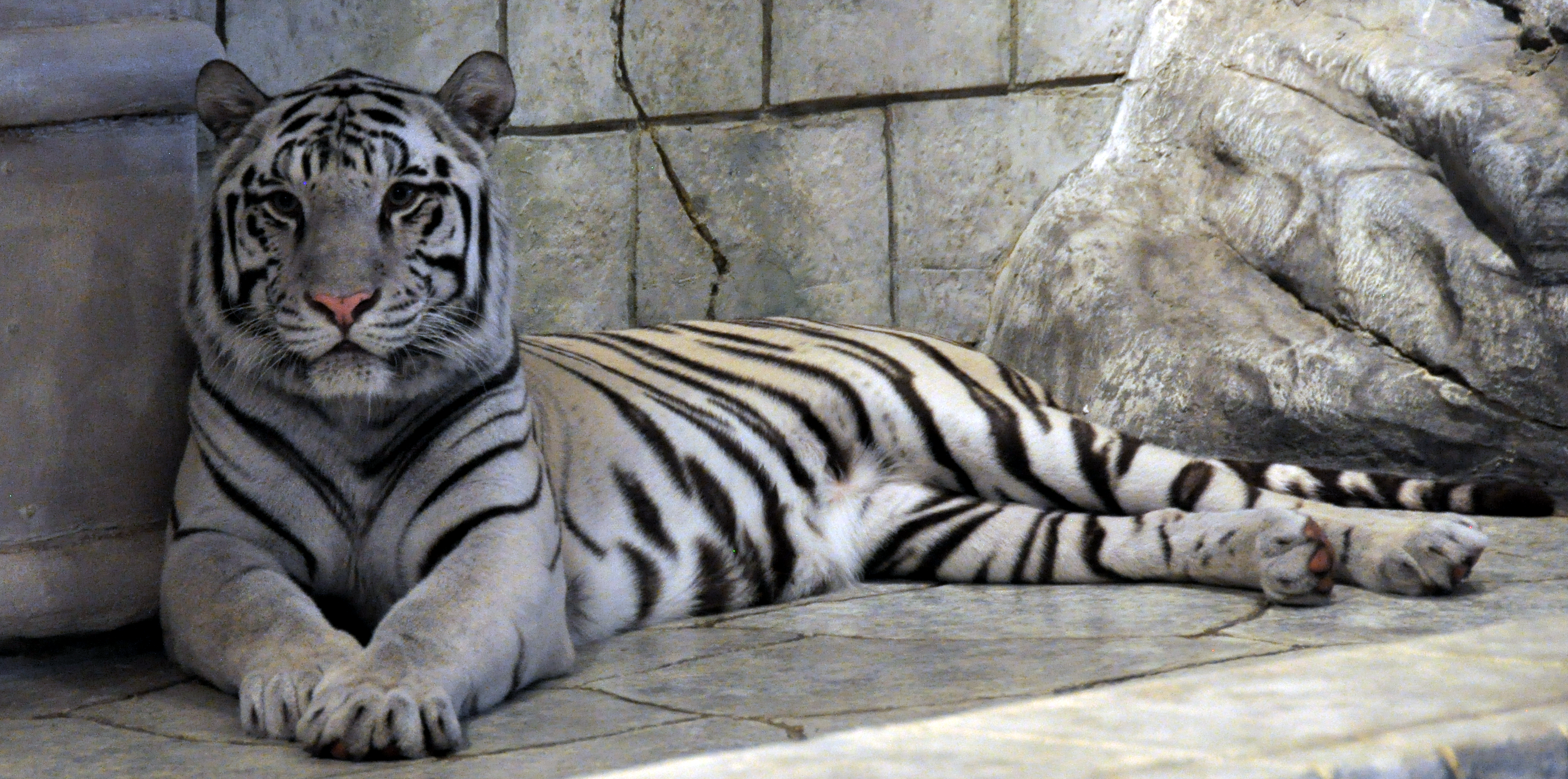
White tiger

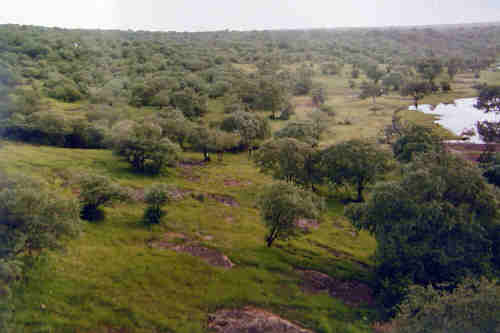
Madhav National Park

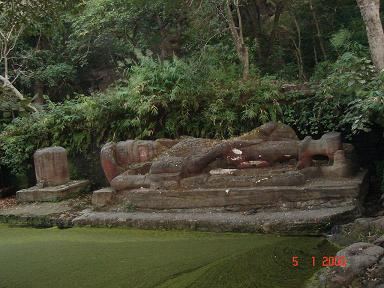
Bandhavgarh National Park

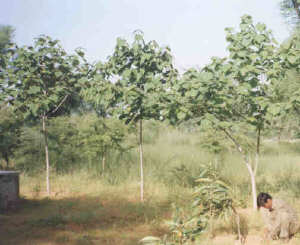
Gmelina arborea

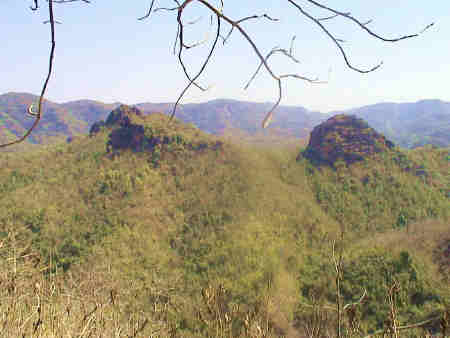
Satpura Range

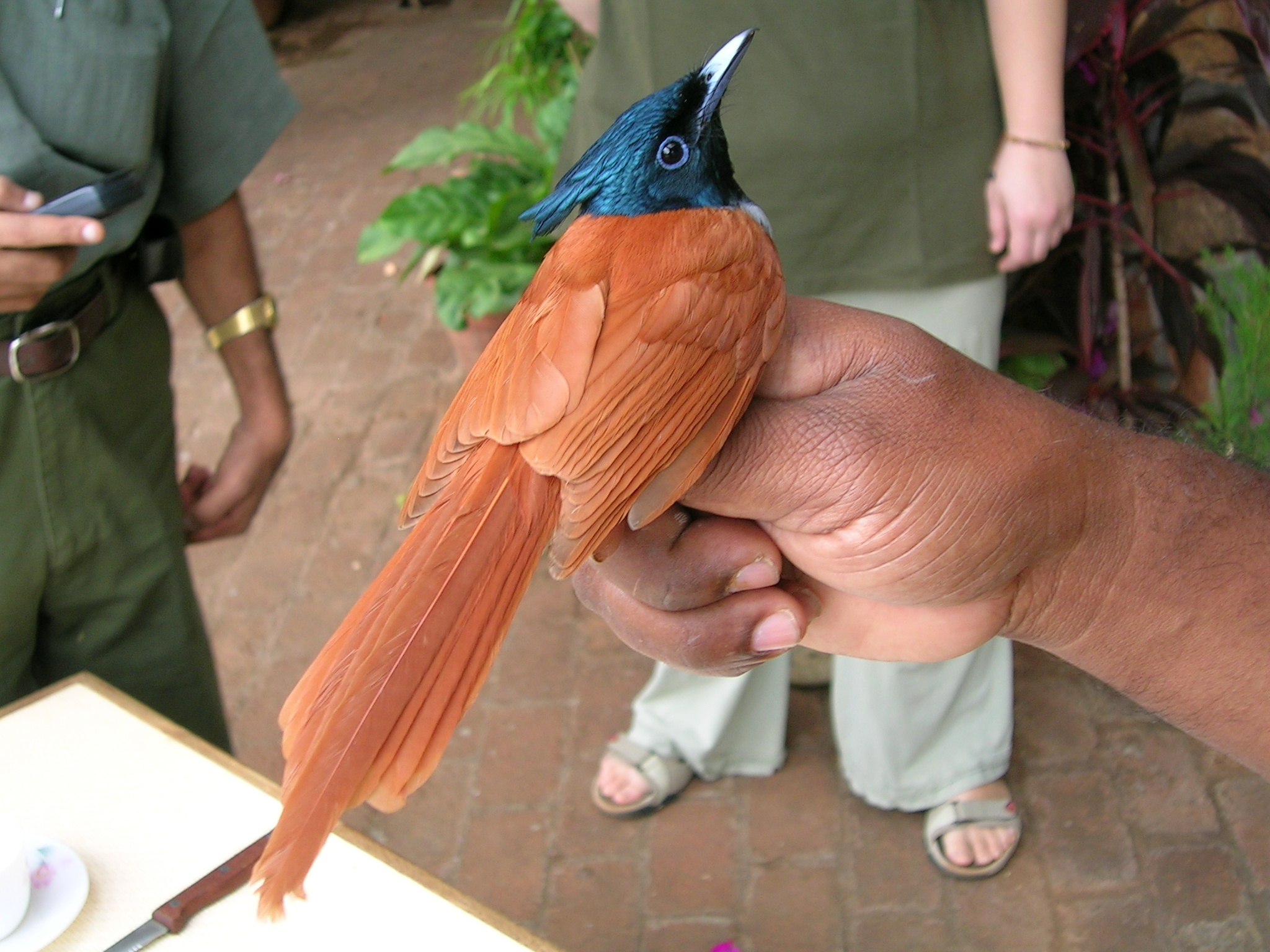
Indian paradise flycatcher

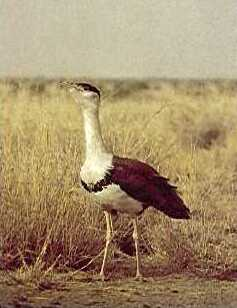
Great Indian bustard
