= Patalkot =

Patalkot may refer to:

- Patalkot, India, in Madhya Pradesh
- Patalkot, Nepal
