= Multinational state =

State comprising multiple nations

A multinational state or a multinational union is a sovereign entity that comprises two or more nations or states. This contrasts with a nation-state, where a single nation accounts for the bulk of the population. Depending on the definition of "nation" (which touches on ethnicity, language, and political identity), a multinational state is usually multicultural or multilingual, and is geographically composed of more than one country, such as the countries of the United Kingdom.

Historical multinational states that have since split into multiple states include the Ottoman Empire, British India, Qing China, Czechoslovakia, the Soviet Union, Yugoslavia, the United Arab Republic, and Austria-Hungary (a dual monarchy of two multinational states). Some analysts have described the European Union as a multinational state or potentially one.

== Definition ==
Many attempts have been made to define multinational states. One complicating factor is that it is possible for members of a group that could be considered a nation to identify with more than one nation-state. According to David Katiambo, many countries are multination states and there are only "few nation-states with a perfect match between the nation and the state." Ilan Peleg wrote in Democratizing the Hegemonic State:

One can be a Scot and a Brit in the United Kingdom, a Jew and an American in the United States, an Igbo and a Nigerian in Nigeria ... One might find it hard to be a Slovak and a Hungarian, an Arab and an Israeli, a Breton and a Frenchman.

A state may also be a society, and a multiethnic society has people belonging to more than one ethnic group, in contrast to societies that are ethnically homogeneous. By some definitions of "society" and "homogeneous", virtually all contemporary national societies are multiethnic. The scholar David Welsh argued in 1993 that fewer than 20 of the 180 sovereign states then in existence were ethnically and nationally homogeneous, if a homogeneous state was defined as one in which minorities made up less than 5 percent of the population. Sujit Choudhry therefore argues that "[t]he age of the agriculturally homogeneous state, if ever there was one, is over".

== Modern multinational states ==
=== Africa ===
Most countries in Sub-Saharan Africa are former colonies and, as such, are not drawn along national lines, making them truly multinational states.

==== Ghana ====
There is no ethnic majority in Ghana. The plurality group, the Akan people, are a meta-ethnicity (that is, a collection of similar but distinct ethnicities). While Akan is the most-widely spoken language in Ghana, English is the official language of government.

==== Kenya ====
Kenya is home to more than 70 ethnic groups; the most populous of which are the Kikuyu, at about 20 percent of the population. Together, the five largest groups—the Kikuyu, Luo, Luhya, Kamba, and Kalenjin—account for 70 percent of Kenyans. The major impediment to nation-building in Kenya is the schism caused by the failure to align the mystically bonded ethnic groups to the state so that the state territory can simultaneously be the national territory and vice versa. According to David Katiambo, although the hegemony of the nation-state should ideally lead to each state having one nation, regardless of Kenya's deliberate nation-building efforts aimed at reversing the fragmented ethnic nations of the colonial epoch, the nation-state is still in competition with ethnic sub-nationalism.

==== Nigeria ====
Map of Nigeria's linguistic groups

The largest nation in Nigeria is the Hausa-Fulani, which accounts for 29 percent of the country's population. However, the group actually encompasses two distinct ethnicities: the Hausa and the Fulani (or Fulbe). While both ethnicities are found in large areas of West Africa, it is only in Nigeria that they are classified as a single ethnic group for political expediency. Nigeria is also made up of many other ethnic groups like the Yoruba, Igbo and Ibibio. Prior to colonialism, they were not self identified as one ethnic nationality but are so today along with the three Hausa-Fulani, Yoruba, and Igbo which classification does carry between each group of who is part of and not part of the group aside from them Nigeria as about 250–500 other ethnic nationalities considered minorities with some large enough to control the outcomes of elections in states such as the Igala and Urhobo. While some are so small that they only show up in one local Government area.

==== South Africa ====
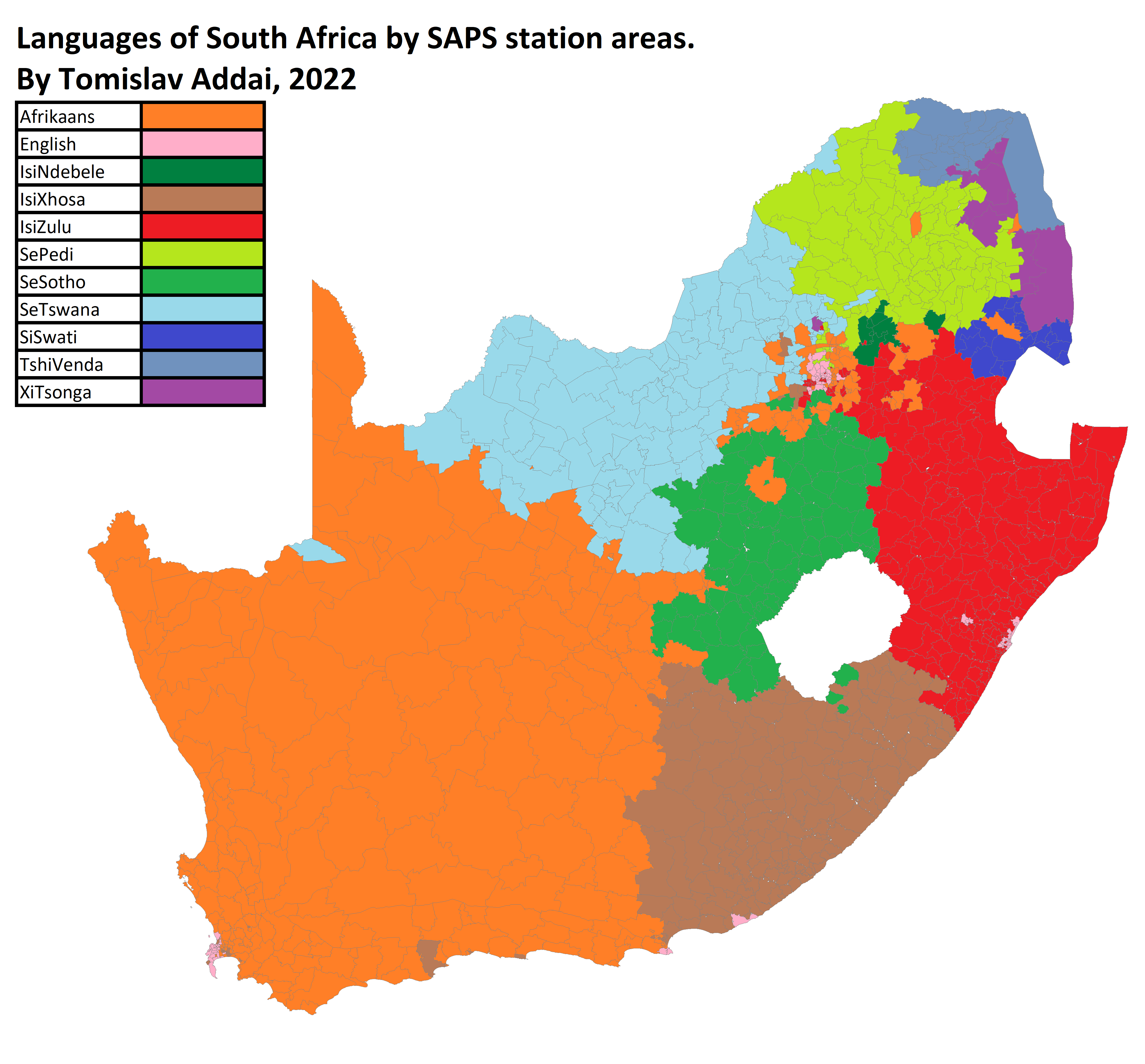
Map showing the dominant languages in South Africa

Present-day South Africa is the successor state to the Union of South Africa, which was formed from four British colonies in 1910.

South Africa has eleven official languages (Afrikaans, English, Ndebele, Pedi, Sotho, Swazi, Tsonga, Tswana, Venda, Xhosa, and Zulu) and formally recognizes several other languages spoken by minority nations. Speakers of each language may be of a different nationality—for example, some members of the Ndebele and Tswana nations speak Zulu, and groups such as the Thembu and Hlubi speak Xhosa.

As is the case throughout Africa, the nations of South Africa mostly correspond to specific regions. However, large cities such as Johannesburg are home to a mixture of national groups, leading to a "melting pot" of cultures. The government has continuously attempted to unify the country's various nationalities and to foster a South African identity.

Many of the nationalities found in South Africa are also found in bordering countries, and in some cases, more members live in South Africa than in the country where the group originated. For example, there are more Sotho, Tswana, and Swazi people living in South Africa than in the bordering nation states of Lesotho, Botswana, and Eswatini, respectively. In the past, this has led to conflict. Lesotho still claims large swathes of South Africa, and attempts have been made to cede some South African territory to Botswana and Eswatini. All three states were intended to be incorporated in the Union of South Africa, but those plans never came to fruition because of power struggles within their apartheid governments.

=== Americas ===
==== Bolivia ====
Since 2010, under the presidency of Evo Morales, Bolivia has been officially defined as a plurinational state, which recognizes the national distinctiveness of various indigenous peoples.

==== Canada ====
Whether Canada should be described as "multinational" is an ongoing topic in academia and popular discourse. The current policy of the federal government is that Canada is bilingual—English and French are both official languages—and multicultural. In 2006, the House of Commons of Canada voted in favour of Government Business No. 11, which states that the Québécois "form a nation within a united Canada". According to Canadian political philosopher Charles Blattberg, Canada should be seen as a multinational country. All Canadians are members of Canada as a civic or political community, a community of citizens, and this is a community that contains many other kinds within it. These include not only communities of ethnic, regional, religious, and civic (the provincial and municipal governments) sorts, but also national communities, which often include or overlap with many of the other kinds. He thus recognizes the following nations within Canada: those formed by the various First Nations, that of francophone Quebecers, that of the anglophones who identify with English Canadian culture, and perhaps that of the Acadians.

=== Asia ===
==== Afghanistan ====
While Pashto and Dari being Afghanistan's two official languages, the nation is separated into several ethnolinguistic groups which the major ones include the Pashtuns, Tajiks, Hazaras, Uzbeks, Aimaqs, Turkmens, Balochs, and Sadats. Among the minor groups are the Pashayis, Nuristanis, Pamiris, Kurds, Kyrgyz, Gujjar and several others.

==== Bhutan ====
The four major groups that compose Bhutan's ethnic population are the Ngalops, which make up the majority, the Sharchops, the Lhotshampas, and the aboriginal or indigenous tribal peoples living in villages and communities scattered throughout the country. There are also Tibetan refugees that have been around since 1959 during the 1959 Tibetan Rebellion.

==== Cambodia ====
While the ethnic Khmer make up 90-94% of Cambodia, others consists of four different major minority groups: the Chams, the indigenous highland Khmer Loeu tribes, the ethnic Chinese, and the ethnic Vietnamese, in addition to other smaller minority groups such as the Khmer Krom.

==== China ====
Ethnolinguistic map of China

The People's Republic of China (PRC) is a multinational state consisting of 56 ethnic groups with the Han people the largest ethnic group in mainland China. As of 2010, 91.51% of the population were classified as Han (~1.2 billion). Besides the Han Chinese majority, 55 other ethnic (minority) groups are categorized in present China, numbering approximately 105 million people (8%), mostly concentrated in the bordering northwest, north, northeast, south and southwest but with some in central interior areas.

The major minority ethnic groups in China are Zhuang (16.9 million), Hui (10.5 million), Manchu (10.3 million), Uyghur (10 million), Miao (9.4 million), Yi (8.7 million), Tujia (8.3 million), Tibetan (6.2 million), Mongolian (5.9 million), Dong (2.8 million), Buyei (2.8 million), Yao (2.7 million), Bai (1.9 million), Korean (1.8 million), Hani (1.6 million), Li (1.4 million), Kazakh (1.4 million) and Dai (1.2 million). At least 126,000 people from Canada, the US and Europe are living in Mainland China. In addition, there are also unrecognized ethnic groups, for example: Chuanqing people (穿青人), and others, who account for over 730,000 people.

However, the Republic of China (ROC), which ruled mainland China from 1912 to 1949 and currently governs the island of Taiwan since 1945, had recognized five main ethnic groups under Five Races Under One Union: Han, Hui, Manchu, Mongol and Tibetan. Since retreating to Taiwan, the ROC government recognizes 16 groups of Taiwanese aborigines, which constitutes a number 569,000 or 2.38% of the island's population. The PRC classifies them as Gāoshān.

==== India ====
India has more than 2,000 ethnolinguistic groups which includes over 645 indigenous tribes with 52 major tribes among them, and over 80,000 subcultures, and every major religion is represented being Hinduism, Islam, Adivasi, Sikhism, Buddhism, and Christianity as are four major language families (Indo-Aryan, Dravidian, Austroasiatic, and Sino-Tibetan) and a language isolate (Nihali).

Each state and union territory of India has one or more official languages, and the Constitution of India recognizes in particular 22 "scheduled languages". It also recognizes 212 scheduled tribal groups, which together constitute about 7.5% of the country's population.

Most of its states are based on a linguistic ethnicity, including Uttar Pradesh, Madhya Pradesh, and Chhattisgarh (Hindustanis), Gujarat (Gujaratis), West Bengal (Bengalis), Maharashtra (Marathis), Odisha (Odias), Goa (Konkanis), Haryana (Haryanvis), Rajasthan (Rajasthanis), Punjab (Punjabis), Tamil Nadu (Tamils), Andhra Pradesh and Telangana (Telugus), Karnataka (Kannada), Kerala (Malayalis), Assam (Assamese), Nagaland (Nagas), Manipur (Manipuris), Mizoram (Mizos), Meghalaya (Khasi), Tripura (Tripuri), and Sikkim (Sikkimese). Jammu and Kashmir is the only union territory in the country based on this which is home to the Kashmiris, Dogras, Ladakhis, Gujjars, Bakarwals, Paharis, Dards, Hanjis, and several other people groups.

Furthermore, several other Indian states are themselves ethnically, linguistically, and religiously diverse. The tribes of Uttar Pradesh are Agarias, Baigas, Bhars, Cheros, Gonds, Kolis, Korwas, Tharus, Bhoksas, Bhotiyas, Jaunsaris, and Rajis; Madhya Pradesh is where tribes such as the Gonds, Bhils, Baiga, Korku, Bhadia, Halba, Kaul, Mariya, Malto and Sahariya; Chhattisgarh's tribal population consists mainly of the Gonds, Kanwars, Brinjhwasr, Bhaina, Bhatra, Uraon, Oraons, Kamar, Halba, Baiga, Sanwras, Korwas, Bhariatis, Nageshias, Manghwars, Kharias, and Dhanwars; Bihar has the Bhojpuris, Maithils, and Magadhis, and Jharkhand has the Santhals, Oraons, Mundas, Kharias, and Hos while both states are home to several other groups like the Hindustani-speaking peoples; Uttarakhand is where the Garhwalis, Kumaonis, and tribes like the Jaunsaris, Bhotiyas, Tharus, Bhoksas, Rajis, and Banrawats resides; Karnataka houses the Kannadigas, Tuluvas, and several others; Himachal Pradesh is home to tribes like the Kinnauris, Gujjars, Lahaulis, Gaddis, Swanglas, Pangwalis, Khampas, and others; Arunachal Pradesh being the home of various tribes like the Abor, Hruso, Apatanis, Nyishis, Tagins, Galos, Khamptis, Mishmis, Monpa, any Naga tribes, Sherdukpens, and Singpho; the Assam includes the Assamese, Bodo, and Karbi peoples.

==== Indonesia ====
Map showing ethnic groups native to Indonesia

Indonesia is a very diverse country with over 600 ethnic groups. The vast majority of them speak Austronesian languages and among these tribal people groups are the Javanese, Sundanese, Malays, Madurese, Bugis, Torajans, Bataks, Mandarese, Minangkabau, Betawi, Banjarese, Acehnese, Balinese, Dayaks, Sasaks, Cirebonese, Lampungese, Palembang, Gorontaloa, Minahasan, Nias, and Makassarese. Another group of indigenous peoples in the country are the native Melanesians in the Maluku Islands and Western New Guinea, which include tribes such as the Ambonese, native Timorese peoples, Biak, Dani, Moi, Arfak, Amungme, Asmat, and Korowai, among others. Non-indigenous peoples includes Indos (half-Dutch, half-native Indonesians), Mardijkers, ethnic Chinese and Peranakans, Arabs, and Indians.

The largest ethnicity in Indonesia is the Javanese which makes up 40% of the population and most of them live indigenously in Java island, the most populous island in the country. Generally, people who live outside of Jakarta still retain the ethnic language and utilize it in daily conversations. As a result, formation of distinct dialects each unique to the regions, is prominently used among the population.

==== Laos ====
The government of Laos recognizes over 160 ethnic groups with 49 main ethnicities. These main Laotian ethnic groups separated into 4 linguistic groups which are 8 Lao-Tai peoples which includes the ethnic Lao who make up the majority in the country, 32 Mon-Khmer peoples, 7 Tibeto-Burmese peoples, and 2 Hmong-Loumien peoples. They are generally spread across the nation each with their own distinct traditions, cultures and languages.

==== Malaysia ====
When it was formed on 16 September 1963, Malaysia comprised four independent, self-governing nations: Malaya, Singapore, Sabah, and Sarawak. In 1965, Singapore seceded from the federation. Today, Malaya, Sabah, and Sarawak each have their own ethnic majority. Generally, however, Malaysia is considered to have three major groups: Bumiputeras (Malays, Orang Asli, various native tribes of the Borneo states, and Peranakans), ethnic Chinese, and ethnic Indians. While the Malays make up the majority of population in the country, the Ibans for Sarawak and the Kadazan-Dusun, Murut, and Sama-Bajau peoples for Sabah are dominant in their respective states. Malay is the primary official and national language, followed by English. In Sabah and Sarawak, English is the official language, although many locals speak a dialect of Malay.

==== Myanmar ====
An ethnolinguistic map of Burma, 1972

Myanmar (also known as Burma) is an ethnically diverse nation with 135 distinct ethnic groups officially recognized by the Burmese Government. These are grouped into eight "major national ethnic races": Bamar, Chin, Kachin, Karen, Kayah, Mon, Rakhine, and Shan.The "major national ethnic races" are grouped primarily according to region rather than linguistic or ethnic affiliation, as for example the Shan Major National Ethnic Race includes 33 ethnic groups speaking languages in at least four widely differing language families.

Many unrecognized ethnic groups exist, the largest being the Burmese Chinese and Panthay (who together form 3% of the population), Burmese Indians (who form 2% of the population), Rohingya, Anglo-Burmese and Gurkha.

==== Nepal ====
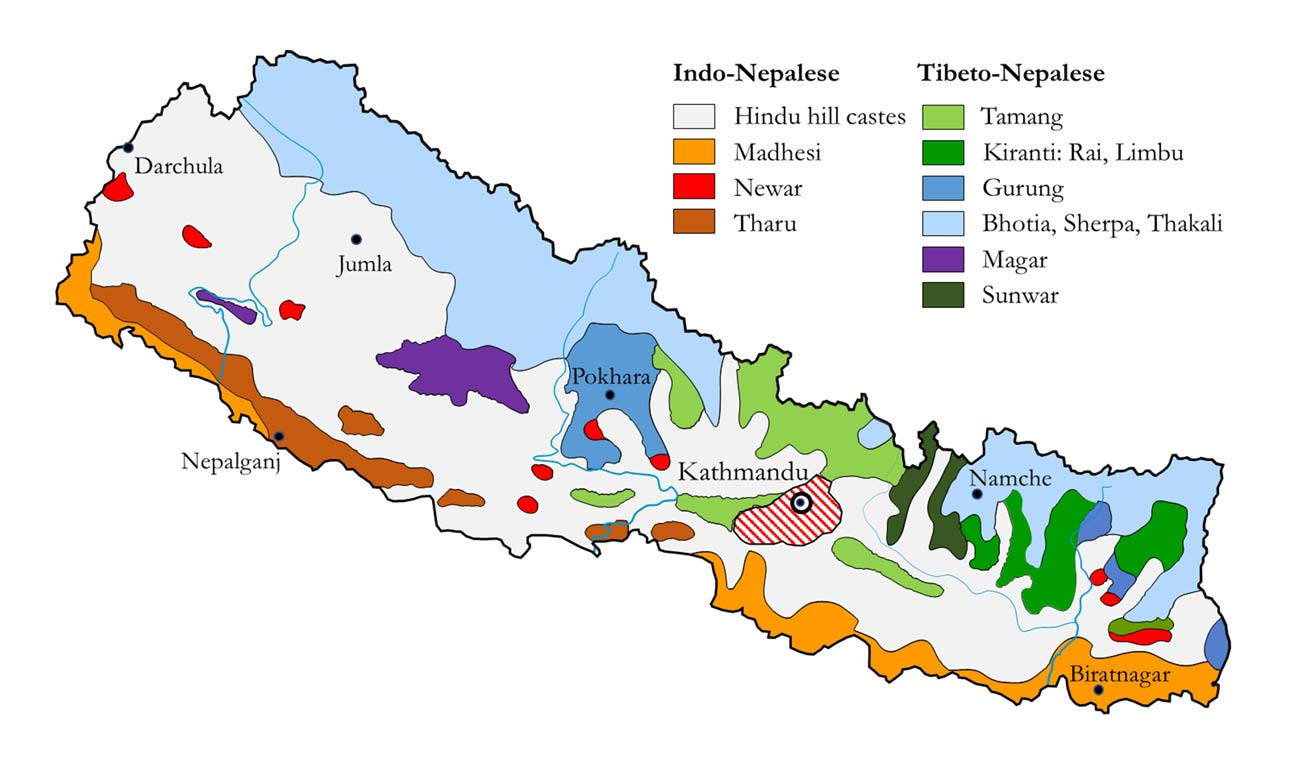
Ethnic groups in Nepal

Nepal is a multi-ethnic country with over 100 ethnic groups. Most ethnic groups fall into one of two categories and either speak Indo-Aryan languages or Sino-Tibetan languages. The official language of the country is Nepali, earlier known as Gorkhali in the Kingdom of Nepal, which is part of the Indo-Aryan group and is the spoken by majority of the population.

The Indo-Aryan languages are spoken by Madhesi people ( Maithili, Bhojpuri, Awadhi) and Tharu ethnic groups which constitutes majority of the speakers in southern Nepal in the Terai region. The people who speak Sino-Tibetan languages includes Tamang, Newari, Magar, Gurung, Kiranti and Sherpa ethnic groups in central and northern Nepal. Much of the ethnic groups migrated from neighbouring countries over the centuries from India and Tibet.

==== Pakistan ====
Dominant Ethnolinguistic Group in each Pakistani District as of the 2017 Pakistan Census

Pakistan's population comprises various ethnolinguistic groups; the major groups are the Punjabis, Pashtuns, Sindhis, Saraikis, Balochis, Brahvis, and Muhajirs. Minor groups includes the Paharis, Kashmiris, Chitralis, Shina, Baltis, Kohistanis, Torwalis, Hazaras, Burusho, Wakhis, Kalash, Siddis, Uzbeks, Nuristanis, Pamiris, Hazarewals and several other minorities.

Present-day Pakistan arose out of the Pakistan Movement, which demanded a separate state for the Muslims of the British Raj. The movement was based on the two-nation theory put forward by Muhammad Ali Jinnah: the idea that Hindus and Muslims in British India represented not only different religious communities but also distinct nations, and hence that, in the event of Indian independence, they should be divided into two nation states. Jinnah outlined the theory as follows:

It is extremely difficult to appreciate why our Hindu friends fail to understand the real nature of Islam and Hinduism. They are not religious in the strict sense of the word, but are, in fact, different and distinct social orders, and it is a dream that the Hindus and Muslims can ever evolve a common nationality, and this misconception of one Indian nation has troubles and will lead India to destruction if we fail to revise our notions in time. The Hindus and Muslims belong to two different religious philosophies, social customs, literatures. They neither intermarry nor interdine together and, indeed, they belong to two different civilizations which are based mainly on conflicting ideas and conceptions. Their aspect on life and of life are different. It is quite clear that Hindus and Mussalmans derive their inspiration from different sources of history. They have different epics, different heroes, and different episodes. Very often the hero of one is a foe of the other and, likewise, their victories and defeats overlap. To yoke together two such nations under a single state, one as a numerical minority and the other as a majority, must lead to growing discontent and final destruction of any fabric that may be so built for the government of such a state."

This movement culminated in the creation of Pakistan in 1947 through the partition of India. Urdu was then promoted as the national language of all South Asian Muslims. However, Pakistan remains linguistically diverse. Punjabis are the largest ethnolinguistic group, but at 45 percent of the population, they do not make up an absolute majority. Furthermore, only 8 percent of Pakistanis speak the national language, Urdu, as their mother tongue. As a result, many nationalist movements that oppose the two-nation theory have emerged, arguing that Pakistan is not only a linguistically diverse state but also a multinational one, and that, therefore, each ethnolinguistic group of Pakistan is a distinct nation. Common grievances of these movements include the idea that Punjabis dominate Pakistan politically and economically, thus marginalizing other groups, and that the establishment of Urdu as the country's sole official language is a form of cultural imperialism that ignores the heritage of Pakistan's diverse peoples.

The most successful of these movements was Bengali nationalism, which led to the creation of the Bengali-speaking nation-state of Bangladesh. The movement asserted that Urdu's official status gave an unfair advantage to Muhajirs (most of whom speak Urdu as their mother tongue) and Punjabis (whose mother tongue, Punjabi, is similar to Urdu, and many of whom were educated in Urdu under British rule). Bengalis feared they would be marginalized despite their demographic strength as, at the time, the largest ethnic group of Pakistan. These grievances culminated in the secession of East Bengal (which had been part of the administrative unit of East Pakistan) and the creation of Bangladesh.

Today, nationalist movements within Pakistan include those of the Sindhis, Pashtuns, Balochs, Muhajirs, and Kashmiris. The members of these movements assert that Islam cannot be considered the sole basis for nationhood, and that Pakistan is therefore a multinational state. Their demands range from increased autonomy or the transformation of Pakistan into a federation, to the recognition of language rights for non-Urdu-speaking populations, to outright secession.

Despite the fact that Punjabis are widely seen as the dominant ethnic group in Pakistan, both economically and politically, there is also a small Punjabi movement that asserts that the Punjabi language has been unfairly subordinated to Urdu and supports the reestablishment of cultural and economic links with East Punjab in India.

==== Philippines ====
Dominant ethnic groups by province

The Philippines has more than 182 distinct ethnolinguistic groups that the vast majority of them speaking Austronesian languages, with the Tagalogs, Bisayans, Ilocanos, Bikols, Kapampangans, Pangasinans, Ivatans, Romblomanons, Masbateños, Kamayos, Moros, Igorots, Lumads, Mangyans, and Zamboangueños being the most prevalent. Among the immigrants and mixed peoples are the Spanish Filipinos, Chinese Filipinos, Japanese Filipinos, Mestizo de Españols, Mestizo de Sangleys, Tornatrás, Indian Filipinos, Sangils, Jewish Filipinos, and American Filipinos.

==== Thailand ====
There are some 70 ethnic groups in Thailand which make up 24 ethnolinguistically Tai peoples such as the Central Thais, Isan, and Northern Thais, 22 Austroasiatic peoples, with significant populations of Northern Khmer and Kuy, 11 Sino-Tibetan-speaking hill tribes, 3 Austronesian peoples being Malays, Moken, and Urak Lawoi. Immigrants in the nation includes communities like the Chinese, Indians, and Thai Portuguese. However, the Royal Thai Government officially recognizes only 62 of these ethnolinguistic groups.

==== Vietnam ====
The Vietnamese government recognizes 54 ethnic groups, of which the Viet (Kinh) is the largest; according to official Vietnamese figures (2019 census), ethnic Vietnamese account for 85.32% of the nation's population and the non-Vietnamese ethnic groups account for the remaining percent. The ethnic Vietnamese inhabit a little less than half of Vietnam, while the ethnic minorities inhabit the majority of Vietnam's land (albeit the least fertile parts of the country).

The central highland peoples commonly termed Degar or Montagnards (mountain people) consist of two main ethnolinguistic types--Malayo-Polynesian and Mon–Khmer. About 30 groups of various cultures and dialects are spread over the highland territory.

Other minority groups include the Chams—remnants of the once-mighty Champa Kingdom, conquered by the Vietnamese through a progress called "Nam Tiến", Hmong, Chinese, and Thái.

=== Europe ===
Montenegro is the only European state with no ethnic majority, but many others have ethnic minorities that form a majority within a province or region (see multilingual countries and regions of Europe).

==== Russia ====
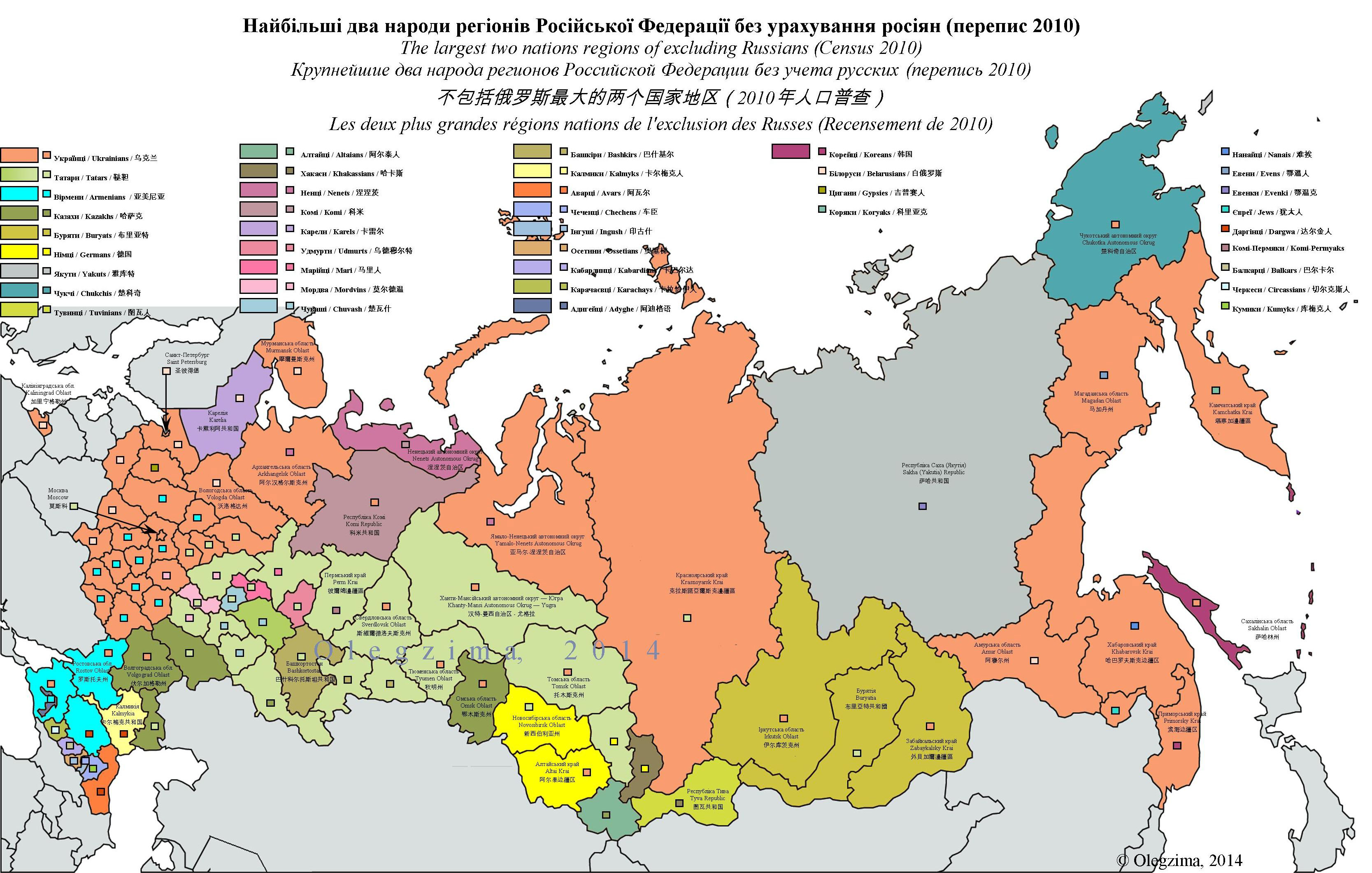
The largest two ethnic groups, excluding Russians, in each region (Census 2010)

Russia is a multinational state, and is home to over 193 ethnic groups. In the 2010 Census, roughly 81% of the population was ethnic Russian, and 19% of the population was minorities; while around 84.93% of Russia's population was of European descent, of which the vast majority were Slavs as well as minorities of Germanic, Baltic-Finnic and other peoples. There are 22 republics in Russia, each designated to have their own ethnicities, cultures, and languages. In 13 of them, ethnic Russians consist a minority. According to the United Nations, Russia's immigrant population is the third-largest in the world, numbering over 11.6 million; most of whom are from post-Soviet states, mainly Ukrainians. The republics are Tatarstan (Volga Tatars), Bashkortostan (Bashkirs, Volga Tatars), Chuvashia (Chuvash), Adygea (Adyghe), Karachay-Cherkessia (Cherkess of Karachay-Cherkessia, Karachays, Nogais, Abaza), Kabardino-Balkaria (Kabardins & Balkars), Chechnya (Chechens), Mordovia (Mordvin), Udmurtia (Udmurts), Mari El (Mari), Kalmykia (Kalmyks), the Komi Republic (Komi), Karelia (Karelians, ethnic Finns, Vepsians), Ingushetia (Ingushs), North Ossetia-Alania (Ossetians), Sakha (Yakuts, Evenki, Evens, Dolgans, Yukaghir), Buryatia (Buryats), Khakassia (Khakas), the Altai Republic (Altai, ethnic Kazakhs), Tuva (Tuvans), and Dagestan (ethnic Azerbaijanis, Chechens, Avars, Dargins, Kumyks, Lezgins, Laks, Tabasarans, Nogais, Aguls, Rutuls, Tsakhurs, Tats and others). There are also 4 autonomous okrugs which are Khanty-Mansi Autonomous Okrug (Khanty & Mansi), Nenets Autonomous Okrug (Nenets), Yamalo-Nenets Autonomous Okrug (Nenets, Selkup), and Chukotka Autonomous Okrug (Chukchi), 1 autonomous oblast, it is Jewish autonomous oblast (Jews, but there are a few of them, because of migration to Israel after dissolution of the Soviet Union), 6 administrative-territorial units with a special status, which are Agin-Buryat Okrug (Buryats) in Zabaykalsky Krai, Ust-Orda Buryat Okrug (Buryats) in Irkutsk Oblast, Koryak Okrug (Koryaks) in Kamchatka Krai, Taymyrsky Dolgano-Nenetsky District (Dolgans, Nenets, Enets, Nganasans) and Evenkiysky District (Evenki) in Krasnoyarsky Krai, Komi-Permyak Okrug (Komi) in Perm Krai.

The Tatars, Bashkirs, and Chechens are three predominantly Muslim minorities in the country. Russia is also home to small Buddhist populations, such as the nomadic Buryats in Buryatia, and the Kalmyks, native to Kalmykia, the only Buddhist region in Europe. There are also the Shamanistic peoples of Siberia and the Far North; the Finno-Ugric peoples of Northwest Russia and the Volga region; the Korean inhabitants of Sakhalin; and the diverse peoples of the North Caucasus.

Russia's official language is Russian. However, Russia's 193 minority ethnic groups speak over 100 languages. According to the 2002 Census, 142.6 million people speak Russian, followed by Tatar with 5.3 million speakers, and Ukrainian with 1.8 million speakers. The constitution gives the individual republics of the country the right to establish their own state languages in addition to Russian.

==== Belgium ====
The territory of Belgium is almost equally divided between the two people groups and their communities: the Dutch-speaking Flemings of Flanders and the French-speaking Walloons of Wallonia. This led to political unrest throughout the 19th and 20th centuries, and in the aftermath of the difficult 2007–08 Belgian government formation, the Belgian media envisaged a partition of Belgium as a potential solution. There is also a German-speaking minority in the east.

==== Bosnia and Herzegovina ====
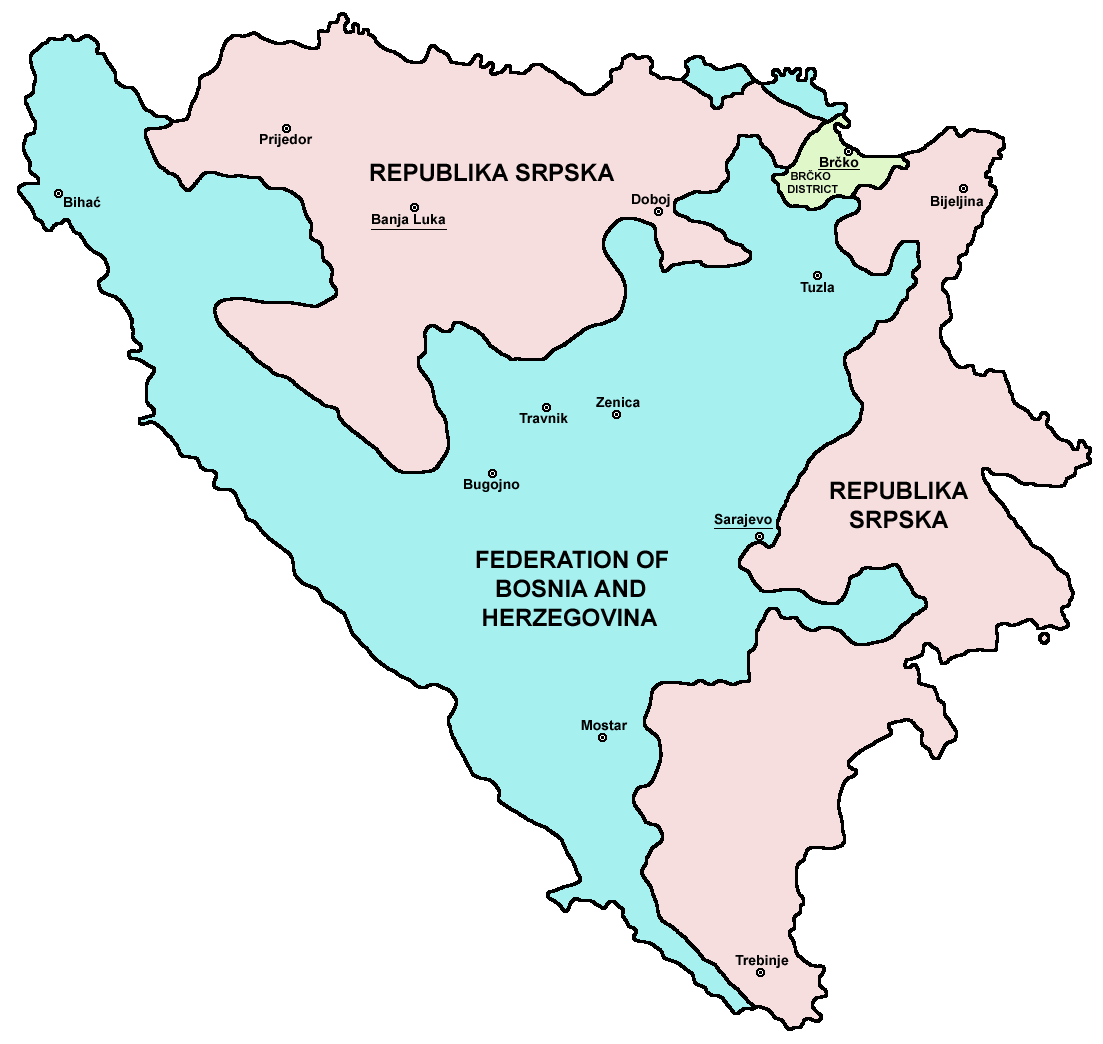
Bosnia and Herzegovina consists of the Federation of Bosnia and Herzegovina (FBiH), the Republika Srpska (RS), and the Brčko District (BD).

Bosnia and Herzegovina is home to three ethnic "constituent peoples": Bosniaks (50.11%), Serbs (30.78%), and Croats (15.43%). The country's political divisions were created by the Dayton Agreement, which recognized a second tier of government comprising two entities: the Federation of Bosnia and Herzegovina (mostly Bosniaks and Croats) and the Republika Srpska (mostly Serbs), with each governing roughly half of the state's territory. A third region, the Brčko District, was governed locally. Today, all three ethnic groups have an equal constitutional status over the entire territory of Bosnia and Herzegovina. The country has a bicameral legislature and a three-member presidency composed of one member of each major ethnic group.

==== Norway ====
Official policy states that Norway was founded on the territory of two peoples, Norwegians and Samis. In addition, Forest Finns, Kvens, Jews, Romani, and the Norwegian and Swedish Travellers are recognised as national minorities.

==== Spain ====
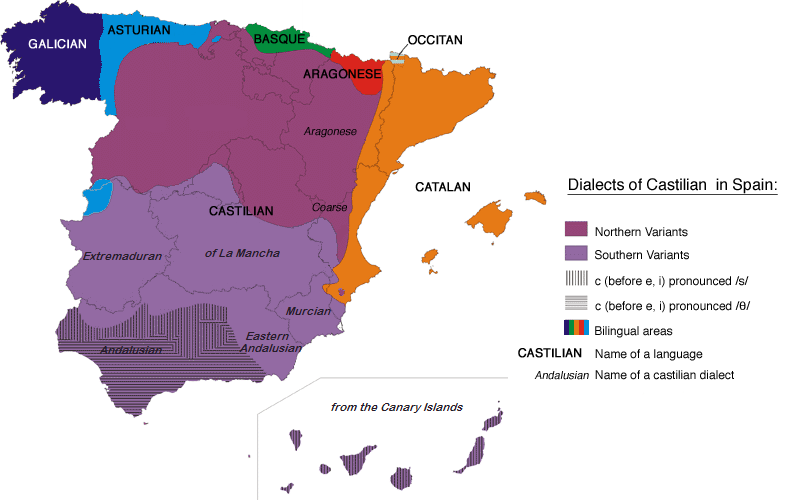
Languages and dialects in Spain

Definitions of ethnicity and nationality in Spain are politically fraught, particularly since the transition from Francoist Spain to the (restored) Kingdom of Spain in the 1970s, when local regionalisms and peripheral nationalisms became a major part of national politics.

The term Spanish people (Spanish: pueblo español) is defined in the Spanish Constitution of 1978 as the political sovereign, i.e., the citizens of the Kingdom of Spain. The same constitution, in its preamble, speaks of "peoples and nationalities of Spain" (pueblos y nacionalidades de España) and their respective cultures, traditions, languages, and institutions.

The CIA World Factbook (2011) describes Spain's ethnic makeup as a "composite of Mediterranean and Nordic types", instead of the usual breakdown of ethnic composition. This reflects the formation of the modern Kingdom of Spain by the accretion of numerous independent Iberian realms: Andalusia, Aragon, Asturias, Castile, Catalonia, Galicia, León, Mallorca, Navarre, and Valencia. Thus, today's Spaniards include Andalusians, Aragonese, Asturians, Basques, Cantabrians, Castilians, Catalans, Galicians, Leonese, and Valencians, and individual members of these groups may or may not consider them distinct nations.

==== United Kingdom ====
Home Nations of the United Kingdom

While the Office for National Statistics describes the United Kingdom as a nation state, other people, including former Prime Minister Gordon Brown, describe it as a multinational state. The term "Home Nations" is used to describe the national teams that represent the four nations of the United Kingdom: England, Northern Ireland, Scotland, and Wales in various sports.

The Kingdom of Great Britain was created on 1 May 1707 by the political union of the kingdoms of England and Scotland. This unification was the result of the Treaty of Union, which was agreed on 22 July 1706 and then ratified by the parliaments of England and Scotland in the 1707 Acts of Union. The two kingdoms, along with the Kingdom of Ireland, had already been in a personal union as a result of the 1603 Union of the Crowns, in which James VI, King of Scots, inherited the Kingdoms of England and Ireland and moved his court from Edinburgh to London. However, until 1707, all three had remained separate political entities with separate political institutions.

Prior to the Acts of Union, the Kingdoms of England and Scotland both had minority populations of their own that could themselves be called nations. Wales and Cornwall were part of the Kingdom of England (Wales had been officially incorporated into England by the Laws in Wales Acts 1535 and 1542, although it had been a de facto English territory since the 13th century; Cornwall had been conquered during the Anglo-Saxon period). The Northern Isles, with their Norse-derived culture, were part of Scotland, having been pledged by Norway as security against the payment of a dowry for Margaret of Denmark and then integrated in 1471. When the Kingdom of Great Britain was created, many of its inhabitants retained a sense of English, Scottish, or Welsh identity. Many of them also spoke languages other than English: principally Scottish Gaelic, Scots, Welsh, Cornish, and Norn.

Almost a century later, the Kingdom of Ireland merged with the Kingdom of Great Britain to form the United Kingdom of Great Britain and Ireland under the 1800 Acts of Union. The United Kingdom thus became the union of the kingdoms of England, Ireland, and Scotland. Eventually, disputes within Ireland over the terms of Irish home rule led to the partition of the island: The Irish Free State received dominion status in 1922, while Northern Ireland remained part of the UK. As a result, in 1927, the formal title of the UK was changed to its current form, the United Kingdom of Great Britain and Northern Ireland.

Political, ethnic, and religious tensions between Irish and British groups in Northern Ireland culminated in The Troubles. This period of armed conflict erupted in 1966 between loyalist paramilitaries, seeking to maintain the country's position in the UK, and republican paramilitaries, seeking to unify Ireland as a 32-county independent republic. The British Army also played a key role. Following the deaths of over 3,500 people, a peace treaty was reached in 1998, although divisions remain high in some areas and sporadic violence still occurs.

The end of the 20th century brought major governing changes, with the establishment of devolved national administrations for Northern Ireland, Scotland, and Wales following pre-legislative referendums.

The Scottish National Party, the largest political party in Scotland, is committed to the goal of an independent Scotland within the European Union, but this is opposed by three of the four other parties in the Scottish Parliament. A referendum on Scottish independence was held in September 2014, and 55% of the electorate rejected independence in favour of retaining the union. Plaid Cymru, a Welsh nationalist party, has a similar ambition for Wales. Plaid Cymru is currently the second- or third-largest party in Wales depending on how it is measured. Several parties in Northern Ireland, including the second- and third-largest, seek to establish an independent United Ireland, and have repeatedly called for border polls. The d'Hondt system used in Northern Ireland means that either the First Minister or Deputy First Minister will be from one of these parties.

== Former multinational states ==
=== Roman Empire ===
Early Romans assimilated neighbouring tribes in the Italian peninsula, including Etruscans and the Greeks of Magna Graecia. The rights of Roman citizenship extended to the Italic peoples from the 1st century BCE, and later more widely: Gauls, Iberians, Greeks, and the peoples of North Africa and of the Near East joined with Britons and Teutons in a multi-ethnic conglomeration, often headed by "provincial" emperors of non-Roman ethnic stock. The success of the Roman state in melding together various nations into a single putative whole shows in the nature and naming of its successor states: the Byzantine Empire officially styled itself as a "Roman Empire" (historians designate it the "Eastern Roman Empire"), and the Holy Roman Empire (the "Holy Roman Empire of the German Nation") maintained pretensions to control various nationalities in Central Europe from 800 to 1806.

=== Qing dynasty ===
The Qing dynasty was an imperial dynasty that ruled China between 1636 and 1912; it was founded by Manchu people, not by Han Chinese. The Manchu-led dynasty exerted minoritarian rule over the majority-Han Chinese population, and in the 17th and 18th centuries incorporated the regions of present-day Mongolia, Tibet and Xinjiang into the empire through military expansionism. This effectively made China a multi-ethnic empire, with different regions having varying degrees of autonomy under Qing rule.

=== Austria-Hungary ===
Austria-Hungary
Bohemia (1), Bukovina (2), Carinthia (3), Carniola (4), Dalmatia (5), Galicia (6), Küstenland (7), Lower Austria (8), Moravia (9), Salzburg (10), Silesia (11), Styria (12), Tirol (13), Upper Austria (14), Vorarlberg (15), Hungary (16), Croatia-Slavonia (17), and Bosnia (18).

Austria-Hungary, which succeeded the Austrian Empire and the Kingdom of Hungary, was a historical monarchy composed by two multinational states. The centrifugal forces within it, coupled with its loss in World War I, led to its breakup in 1918. Its successor states de jure included the First Austrian Republic, the Kingdom of Hungary, while part from her former territories entirely new states were created such as Czechoslovakia, or other parts incorporated into the Kingdom of Serbs, Croats and Slovenes, Poland, Kingdom of Romania, Kingdom of Italy and the Soviet Union.

The principal languages of Austria-Hungary were German, Hungarian, Polish, Czech, and Croatian, but there were also many minor languages, including Ukrainian, Romanian, Slovak, Serbian, Slovene, Rusyn, Italian, and Yiddish.

=== Ottoman Empire ===
The Ottoman Empire was the dynastic state of the Turkish House of Osman. At its peak in the 16th and 17th centuries, it controlled much of Southeast Europe, Western Asia, the Caucasus, North Africa, and the Horn of Africa.

In addition to Turks, the ethnic groups of the Ottoman Empire included Albanians, Amazighs, Arabs, Armenians, Assyrians, Bosnians, Bulgarians, Circassians, Georgians, Greeks, Jews, Kurds, Laz, Macedonians, Romanians, Serbs, Tatars, and Zazas.

Through millet courts, confessional communities were allowed to rule themselves under their own legal systems: for example, sharia law for Muslims, Canon law for Christians, and halakha law for Jews. After the Tanzimat reforms from 1839 to 1876, the term "millet" was used to refer to legally protected religious minority groups, similar to the way other countries use the word "nation". (The word "millet" comes from the Arabic word "millah" (ملة), which literally means "nation".) The millet system has been called an example of pre-modern religious pluralism.

=== Soviet Union ===
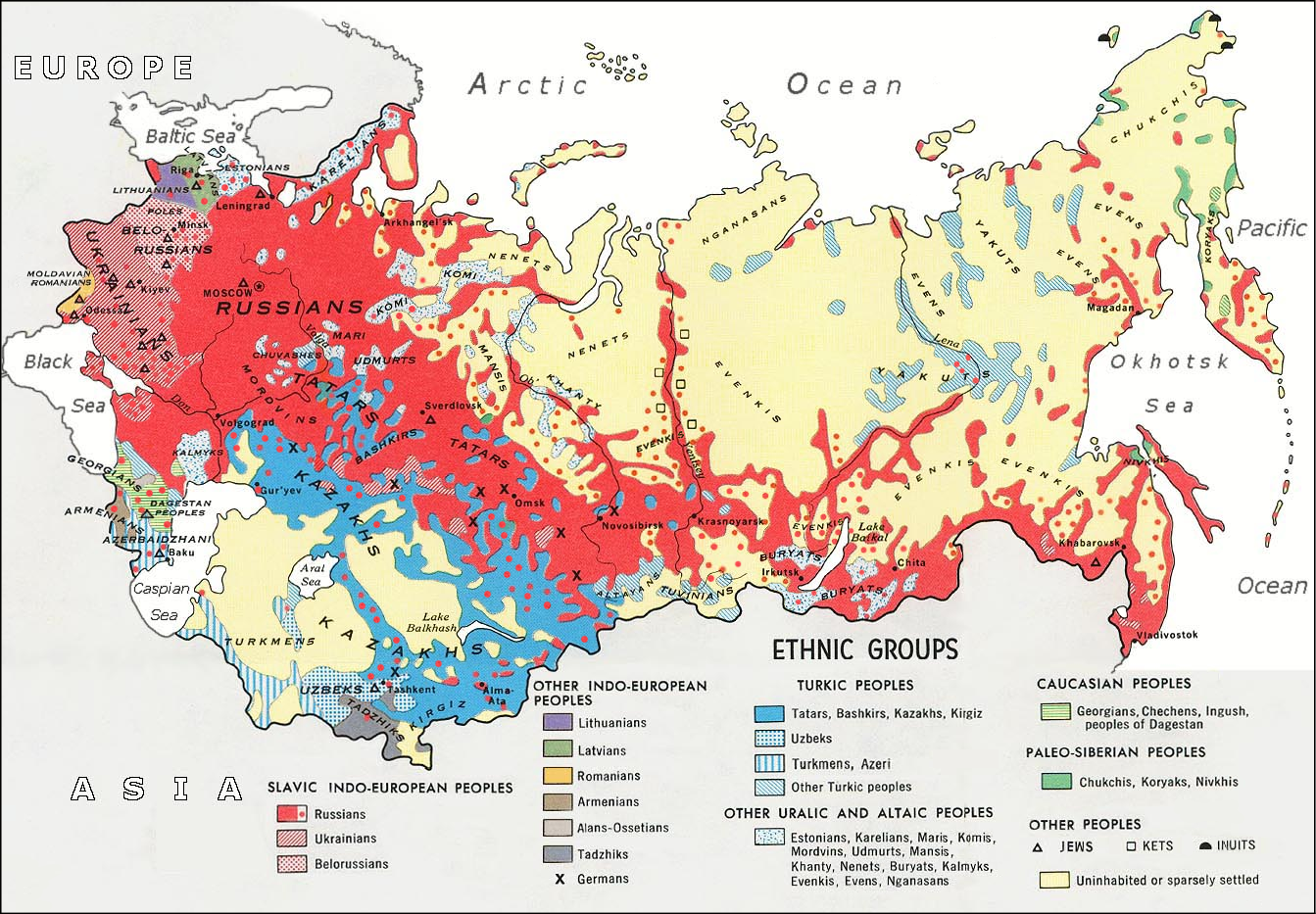
Ethnographic map of the Soviet Union, 1970

The Soviet Union was a state composed of the Soviet republics (of which there were 15 after 1956), with the capital in Moscow. It was founded in December 1922, when the Russian SFSR—which formed during the Russian Revolution of 1917 and emerged victorious in the ensuing Russian Civil War—unified with the Transcaucasian, Ukrainian, and Belarusian SSRs. Addressing the Extraordinary Eighth Congress of Soviets of the Soviet Union on 25 November 1936, Joseph Stalin stated that "within the Soviet Union there are about sixty nations, national groups, and nationalities. The Soviet state is a multinational state." Among the 15 republics were the Baltic states of Estonia, Latvia and Lithuania, which were illegally annexed into the Soviet Union in 1940. The Soviet occupation of the Baltic states was not recognized by a number of Western governments including the United States.

In the late 1980s, some of the republics sought sovereignty over their territories, citing Article 72 of the USSR Constitution, which stated that any constituent republic was free to secede. On 7 April 1990, a law was passed allowing a republic to secede if more than two-thirds of its residents voted for secession in a referendum. Many held free elections, and the resulting legislatures soon passed bills that contradicted Soviet laws, in what became known as the War of Laws.

In 1989, the Russian SFSR—the largest constituent republic, with about half of the USSR's population—convened a new Congress of People's Deputies and elected Boris Yeltsin its chairman. On 12 June 1990, the Congress declared Russia's sovereignty over its territory and proceeded to pass legislation that attempted to supersede Soviet laws. Legal uncertainty continued through 1991 as constituent republics slowly gained de facto independence.

In a referendum on 17 March 1991, majorities in nine of the 15 republics voted to preserve the Union. The referendum gave Soviet leader Mikhail Gorbachev a minor boost, and in the summer of 1991, the New Union Treaty was designed and agreed upon by eight republics. The treaty would have turned the Soviet Union into a much looser federation, but its signing was interrupted by the August Coup—an attempted coup d'état against Gorbachev by hardline Communist Party members of the government and the KGB, who sought to reverse Gorbachev's reforms and reassert the central government's control over the republics. When the coup collapsed, Yeltsin—who had publicly opposed it—came out as a hero, while Gorbachev's power was effectively ended.

As a result, the balance of power tipped significantly toward the republics. In August 1991, Latvia and Estonia had regained their independence (following Lithuania's 1990 example), while the other twelve republics continued to discuss new, increasingly loose models for the Union.

On 8 December 1991, the presidents of Russia, Ukraine, and Belarus signed the Belavezha Accords, which declared the Soviet Union dissolved and established the Commonwealth of Independent States (CIS) in its place. Doubts remained about the authority of the Belavezha Accords to dissolve the Union, but on 21 December 1991, representatives of every Soviet republic except Georgia—including those that had signed the Belavezha Accords—signed the Alma-Ata Protocol, which confirmed the dissolution of the USSR and reiterated the establishment of the CIS. On 25 December 1991, Gorbachev yielded, resigning as the president of the USSR and declaring the office extinct. He turned the powers vested in the Soviet presidency over to Yeltsin, the president of Russia.

The following day, the Supreme Soviet, the highest governmental body of the Soviet Union, dissolved itself. Many organizations, such as the Soviet Army and police forces, remained in place in the early months of 1992, but were slowly phased out and either withdrawn from or absorbed by the newly independent states.

=== Yugoslavia ===
The breakup of the Socialist Federal Republic of Yugoslavia

The first country to be known by this name was the Kingdom of Yugoslavia, known until 3 October 1929 as the Kingdom of Serbs, Croats, and Slovenes. It was established on 1 December 1918 by the union of the State of Slovenes, Croats, and Serbs and the Kingdom of Serbia (to which the Kingdom of Montenegro had been annexed on 13 November 1918), and the Conference of Ambassadors gave international recognition to the union on 13 July 1922.

The Kingdom of Yugoslavia was invaded by the Axis powers in 1941 and abolished as a result of World War II. It was succeeded by Democratic Federal Yugoslavia, proclaimed in 1943 by the Yugoslav Partisans resistance movement. When a communist government was established in 1946, the country was renamed the Federal People's Republic of Yugoslavia. In 1963, it was renamed again, becoming the Socialist Federal Republic of Yugoslavia (SFRY). This was the largest Yugoslav state, with Istria and Rijeka having been added after World War II.

The country consisted of six constituent "socialist republics" (SR Bosnia and Herzegovina, SR Croatia, SR Macedonia, SR Montenegro, SR Slovenia, and SR Serbia) and two "socialist autonomous provinces" (SAP Vojvodina and SAP Kosovo, which became largely equal to other members of the federation after 1974).

Starting in 1991, the SFRY disintegrated in the Yugoslav Wars, which followed the secession of most of the country's constituent entities. The next Yugoslavia, known as the Federal Republic of Yugoslavia, existed until 2003, when it was renamed Serbia and Montenegro. In 2006, this last vestige separated into Serbia and Montenegro, but only to go further in 2008 after Kosovo unilaterally declared its independence but with limited recognition.

=== Czechoslovakia ===
Linguistic map of Czechoslovakia in 1930

Czechoslovakia was a multi-ethnic state, with Czechs and Slovaks as constituent peoples. Sudeten Germans were forcibly expelled after World War II.

== See also ==
- Multiculturalism
- Multiracialism
- Nation state
- Plurinational
- Polyethnicity
- Stateless nation
