= Bhariati =

Indic language spoken in the Patalkot Valley of Madhya Pradesh

- भरीयाटी
- Native to: India
- Region: Madhya Pradesh, Chhattisgarh, Uttar Pradesh, West Bengal
- Ethnicity: Bharia
- Native speakers: 50,000 (approximate) (2018)
- Language family: Indo-European: Indo-Iranian; Indo-Aryan; (unclassified); Bhariati
- Writing system: Devanagari

Language codes
- ISO 639-3: bha
- Glottolog: bhar1241

Bhariati is an unclassified Indo-Aryan or Dravidian language spoken in the Patalkot Valley of Madhya Pradesh in central India.

It is not clear how many of the Bharia people of the 1981 census figure, who were spread out over several states outside the Patalkot Valley, speak the Bhariati language, or a form of Hindi. Not all Bharia people are Bhariati speakers, and the extent of the language has not been determined. Some Bhariati speakers also hold that it is not distinctive enough to be called a language independent of other Indic languages.

Bhariati has mistakenly been described as "Bharia language" in some texts, however, Bharia describes the Bharia people rather than the language. Ethnologue and the adjacent Bible translation organization SIL International have characterized the language as Dravidian, but this claim is often questioned. Linguistic research on the language is scant to date, but it has been posited to be an Indo-Aryan language on the basis of similarities to Hindustani and other languages derived from Sanskrit. The language has a number of cognate features to Hindustani, and incorporates loan words from it.

Bhariati is primarily a spoken language which is rarely written, but writers who have used it have tended to use a Devanagari orthography as it has many phonetic features in common with other languages which use the script. The language is critically endangered.

== Phonology ==
=== Vowels ===
| | Front-Central | Near-back/Back |
|---|---|---|
| Close | iː | uː |
| Near-close | ɪ | ʊ |
| Close-mid | eː | oː |
| Mid | ə | |
| Open-mid | ɛː | ɔː |
| Open | aː | |

=== Consonants ===
| | | Labial | Dental/ Alveolar | Retroflex | Post-alv. | Palatal | Velar | Uvular |
|---|---|---|---|---|---|---|---|---|
| Nasal | | m | n | ɳ | | ɲ | ŋ | |
| Stop/ Affricate | voiceless | p | t̪ | ʈ | t͡ʃ | | k | |
| Stop/ Affricate | aspirated | pʰ | tʰ | ʈʰ | t͡ʃʰ | | kʰ | |
| Stop/ Affricate | voiced | b | d̪ | ɖ | d͡ʒ | | ɡ | |
| Stop/ Affricate | breathy | bʱ | dʱ | ɖʱ | d͡ʒʱ | | ɡʱ | |
| Fricative | voiceless | f | s | | | ç | x | |
| Fricative | voiced | v | z | | | ʝ | ɣ | |
| Rhotic | | | ɾ~r | ɽ | | | | |
| Lateral | | | l | ɭ | | | | |
