= Nauradehi Wildlife Sanctuary =

Wildlife sanctuary in Madhya Pradesh, India

- IUCN category IV (habitat/species management area)
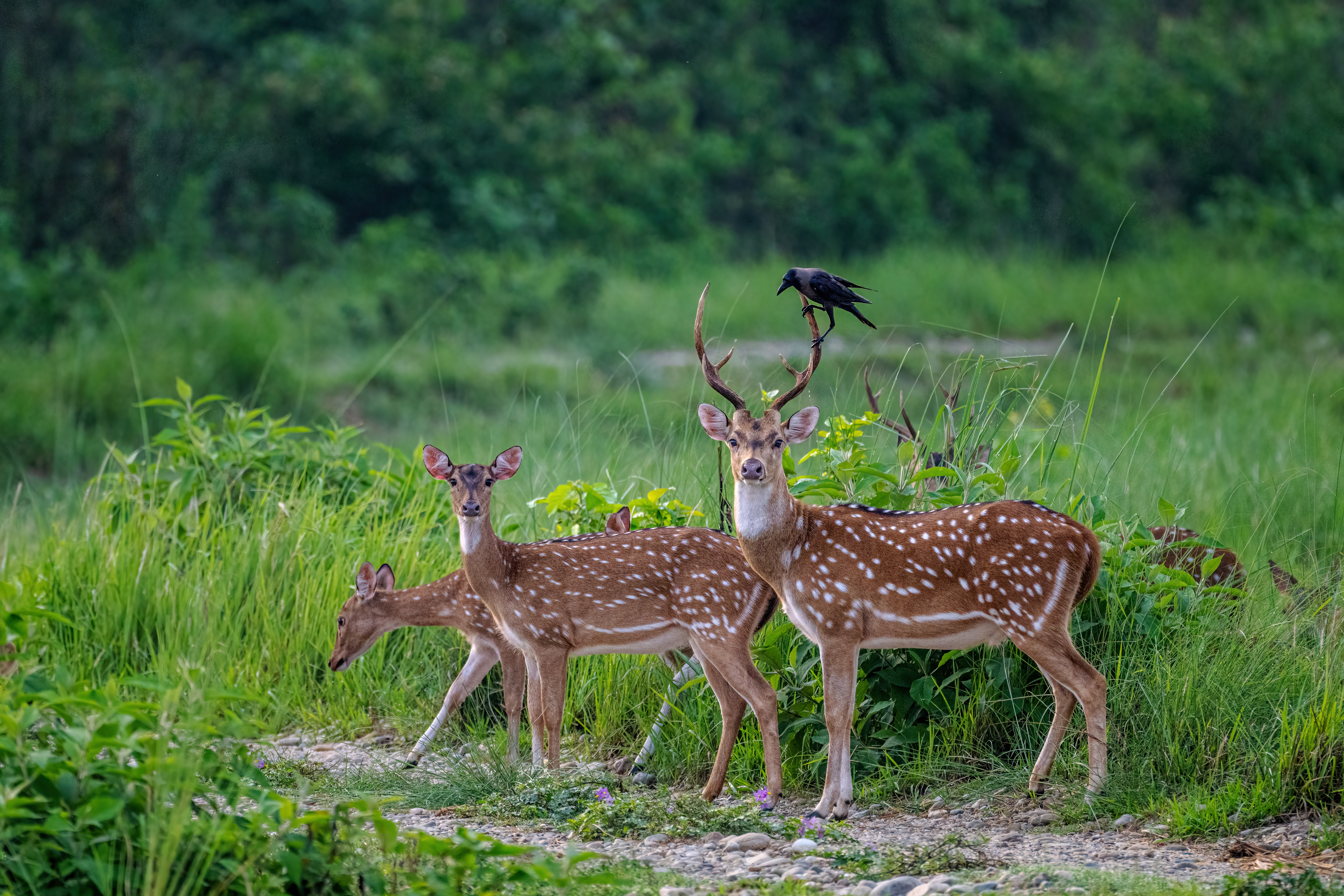
- Spotted Deer in Nauradehi Wildlife Sanctuary

- Location within Madhya Pradesh Location within India
- Interactive map of Nauradehi Wildlife Sanctuary
- Location: Sagar, Damoh, Madhya Pradesh, India
- Coordinates: 23°10′41.31″N 79°12′6.79″E
- Area: 1,197 km^{2} (462 sq mi)
- Established: 1975

Nauradehi Wildlife Sanctuary, covering about 1,197 km^{2} (462 mi^{2}), is the largest wildlife sanctuary of Madhya Pradesh state in India. It is located in the central part of the state covering parts of Sagar, Damoh, Narsinghpur. It is about 90 km from Jabalpur and about 56 km from Saugor.

== History ==
This forest area was made a sanctuary in 1975. It is a potential site for the Cheetah Reintroduction in India. The cheetah prey density were reasonable and based on current prey density the area could support about 25 cheetahs. 750 km^{2} area was recommended by relocation of 23 villages. After relocating the species, the site could support over 50 wild cheetahs and Nauradehi could harbour over 70 individuals.

== Geography ==
The protected area sits astride two major river basins of India, namely the Narmada, flowing west to the Arabian Sea and the Ganges, flowing east to the Bay of Bengal. Three-fourths of the wildlife sanctuary falls in the basin of Ganges tributary, the Yamuna River, of which the Ken River is a tributary, and one fourth of the sanctuary falls in the Naramada basin. The north flowing Kopra River, Bamner River, Vyarma River and Bearma River, which are tributaries of the Ken River, are the major rivers of this protected area. Some smaller streams flow southerly to the Narmada river in the south of the sanctuary.

The forest is spread over the southern area of the Vindhya Range of hills in which the Bandhavgarh National Park and Panna National Park are also located.

Nauradehi Sanctuary is located at an elevation of 400 m (1,300 ft) to 600 m (2,000 ft) above MSL. Average annual rainfall is 1,200 mm (47 in). The seasons here are:

Winter - November to February, 5 °C (41 °F) to 30 °C (86 °F)
Summer - March to June, 30 °C (86 °F) to 48 °C (118 °F) and
Monsoon - July to October, 20 °C (68 °F) to 35 °C (95 °F).

The wildlife refuge is divided into six ranges:

- Mohli Range,
- Singpur Range,
- Jhapan Range,
- Sarra Range,
- D'Gaon Range,
- Nauradehi Range

== Flora ==
The flora consists of central Indian Monsoon forests, which include tropical dry deciduous forest. Major trees found are teak, saja, dhawda, sal, tendu (Coromandel ebony), bhirra (East Indian satinwood) and mahua. In March the deciduous trees begin to shed their leaves for a hot summer season.

The sanctuary exists as fragmented patches of variable density forest. The sanctuary needs more research and study of its habitats, flora, fauna and avi-fauna.

== Fauna ==
Indian wolf is the keystone species of Nauradehi Wildlife Sanctuary. Other carnivores here include: Bengal tiger, Indian leopard, striped hyena, wild dog (Dhole), Bengal fox, Muggar crocodile, golden jackal, and bears. The tiger and the leopards are conspicuous by their absence though infrequent evidences are met with. Recently a tigress was found dead due to old age. Other fauna often seen is smooth Indian otter, sloth bear and Indian grey mongoose. Herbivores living here include: Four-horned antelope (Chousingha), nilgai (blue bull), chinkara (Indian gazelle), sambar deer, blackbuck antelope, barking deer, grey langur, rhesus macaque, chital (spotted deer) and wild boar.

Reptile species found in Nauradehi includes monitor lizard, mugger crocodile, turtle, tortoise and snakes.

=== Birds ===
Due to presence of perennial water sources including several rivers and Cheola lake, there are a great number of birds in the protected area. Bird groups found there include: eagles, vultures, storks, cranes, egrets, lapwings, kites, owls, kingfishers, quails and doves.

At least 150 bird species can be seen in Noradehi. Some of the birds are king vulture, Egyptian vulture (E), white-rumped vulture long billed vulture, (CR), lesser adjutant stork (V), painted stork, open-billed stork, spotted owl, barred jungle owlet, black-winged kite, Indian pond heron, green sandpiper, Indian pied myna, common myna, wood sandpiper, red-wattled lapwing, yellow wagtail, purple sunbird, white breasted kingfisher, stork-billed kingfisher, black drongo, Indian robin, long-tailed shrike, black ibis, rock pigeon, Indian peafowl, grey francolin, jungle babbler, golden oriole, spotted dove, Indian roller, magpie, paddyfield pipit, crested serpent eagle, jungle crow, Asian green bee-eater, honey buzzard, changeable hawk eagle, shikra, paradise flycatcher, verditer flycatcher, black naped monarch, common woodshrike, plum headed parakeet, rose ringed parakeet and greater coucal. The spotted grey creeper, a rare bird, is also found here.

During winter season the sanctuary serves as the seasonal home for migratory birds, including the sarus crane.

== Ecotourism ==
The park is open from November to June. The best time to visit is winter i.e. November to February when it is not too hot and trees are still green. The sanctuary closes during monsoon from July till October to give trees and animals time to reacclimatize.

Jabalpur or Bhopal can be convenient bases to explore the sanctuary, which have airports. The Jabalpur-Jaipur highway (NH 12) passes through the sanctuary about 80 km (50 mi) west of Jabalpur. Nearby railheads include Sagar, Damoh and Narsinghpur.

Forest Rest Houses and Forest Department guides are available for visitors to Noradehi.

== External sources ==
- Nauradehi Sanctuary MP Forest department
- Nauradehi Wildlife Sanctuary (Penthouse.in)
- Noradehi Birds Checklist, 120 species
