= Thai Portuguese =

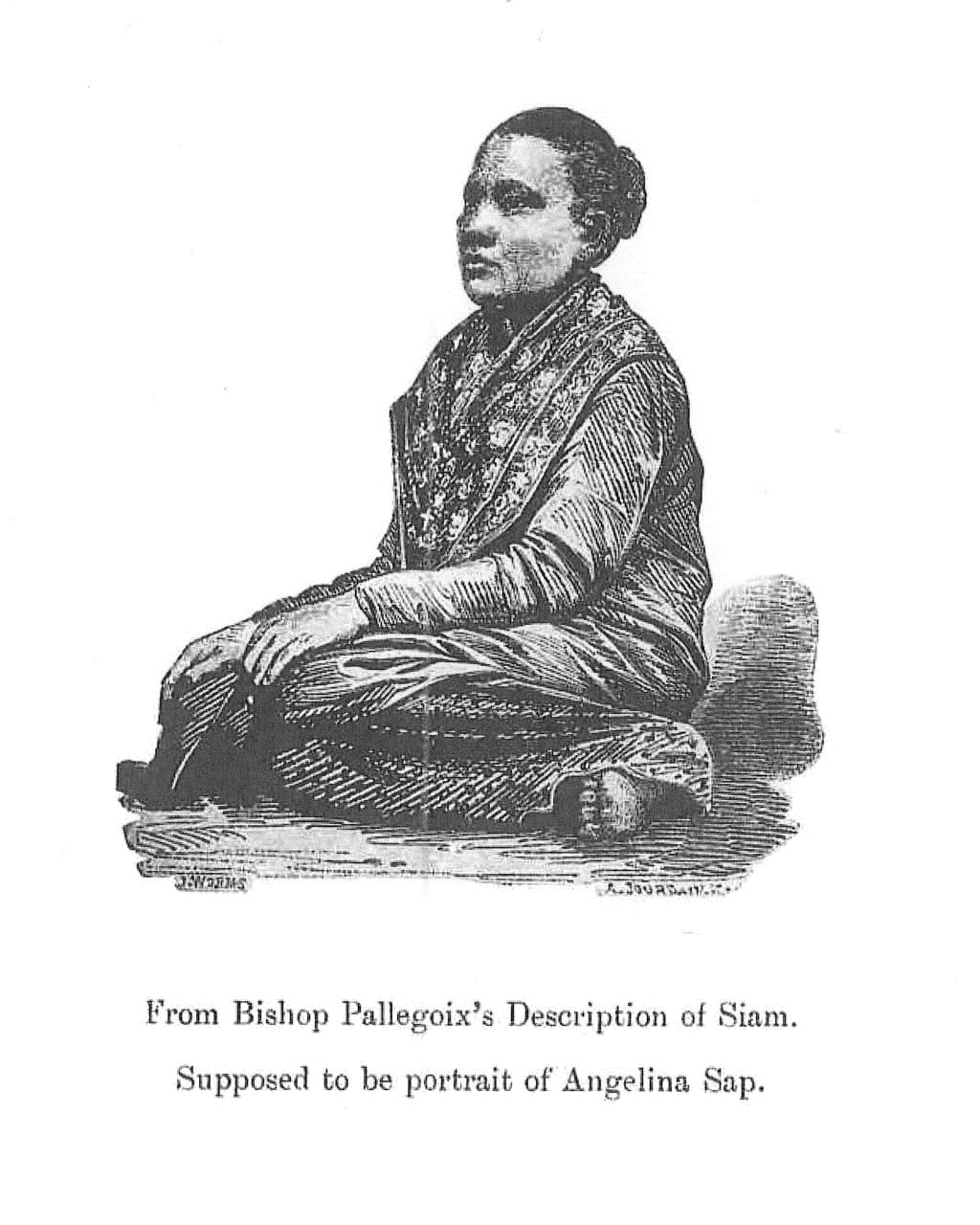
- The image depicts Sap (pseudonym Angelina; 1805–1884), a Portuguese woman of Kudi Chin village. She was a great-granddaughter of Constantine Phaulkon and Maria Guyomar de Pinha and the wife of Robert Hunter.

Total population
- 1,400–2,000 (1830)

Regions with significant populations
- Thonburi · Bangkok Yai · Dusit; Bangkok (Thailand) Thailand; Kampong Serani Penang; Malaysia

Languages
- Thai former: Khmer · Portuguese

Religion
- Roman Catholicism

Related ethnic groups
- Portuguese exiles · Thai · Thai Chinese · Khmer · Mon · Vietnam · India

The Thai Portuguese are a mixed-race ethnic group of Portuguese descent residing in Thailand. Their ancestors were Portuguese who lived in Ayutthaya and migrated to Bangkok after the Second Fall of Ayutthaya. They have two settlements: the Ban Khmer community, centered at Wat Conception, and the Kudi Chin community, centered at Wat Santa Cruz. They are considered the first Westerners to enter the Ayutthaya Kingdom, starting in 1511. Initially, the primary objective was maritime trade. However, Portuguese in Siam later began to play a role as volunteer soldiers in the Ayutthaya court, and this maritime trade was one of the factors that led to the Ayutthaya Kingdom becoming a prosperous port state.

Nowadays, Thai Portuguese no longer use Portuguese for communication, and their physical appearance is no different from that of other Thais. Only their culinary traditions and Roman Catholic religious practices remain, continuing to this day.

== History ==
=== Ayutthaya period ===
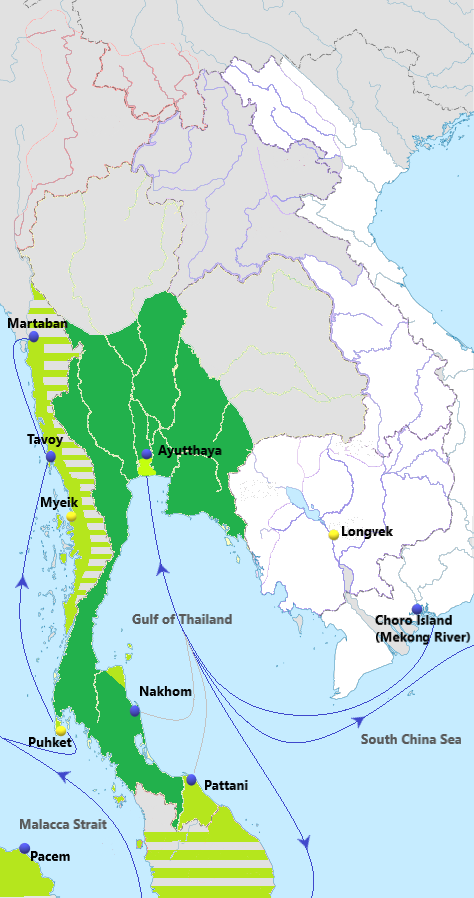
Portuguese trade routes and communities in the Gulf of Thailand

There is evidence that the Portuguese were present in the Ayutthaya Kingdom as early as the 16th century. When Portugal conquered Malacca in 1511, they sent an envoy named Duarte Fernandes to present a royal letter and tribute to Ramathibodi II, who welcomed him warmly and expressed his desire to establish friendly relations with the King of Portugal. Portugal therefore sent an envoy named António de Miranda de Azevedo to establish trade relations and provide military support to Ayutthaya. Ramathibodi II accepted the offer and began trading rice with Malacca in 1513. From then on, Portuguese merchants and mercenaries began to settle in Ayutthaya. They were lower-ranking Portuguese soldiers (Lançados) who became merchants and established their own trading communities, independent from the Portuguese government. In Ayutthaya, they were attracted by trade privileges and tax exemptions. It can be seen that the Portuguese who lived in Ayutthaya held a wide variety of occupations, such as jewelers, sailors, Western physicians, gunsmiths, architects, engineers, merchants, clerks, musicians, and even Brahmins. Towards the late of the reign of Ramathibodi II, it was found that there were approximately 300 Portuguese merchants residing in Ayutthaya. Documents by Fernão Mendes Pinto indicate that 160 Portuguese soldiers joined the Ayutthaya army in attacking Chiang Mai in 1545. And another 120 Portuguese soldiers joined the Ayutthaya army to attack Chiang Mai again two years later.
