= Ken Gharial Sanctuary =

Wildlife sanctuary in India

- IUCN category IV (habitat/species management area)
- Location within Madhya Pradesh Location within India
- Interactive map of Ken Gharial Sanctuary
- Location: Chhattarpur and Panna Districts, Madhya Pradesh, India
- Coordinates: 24°53′26″N 80°04′36″E
- Area: 45.2 km^{2} (17.5 sq mi)
- Established: 1981

Ken Gharial Sanctuary is a wildlife sanctuary in Panna and Chhatarpur Districts of Madhya Pradesh, India. It was established for the conservation of gharial and mugger crocodile populations in 1981.

== Geography ==
Ken Gharial Sanctuary is located at the confluence of the Ken River and Khudar River; it covers an area of 45.201 km^{2} (17.452 sq mi).

== History ==
Ken Gharial Sanctuary was gazetted in 1981 along a 45 km (28 mi) long stretch of the Ken River. It is administered by the Department of Forest.

== See also ==
- Panna National Park
