= Ralamandal Wildlife Sanctuary =

Wildlife sanctuary in Indore, India

- IUCN category IV (habitat/species management area)
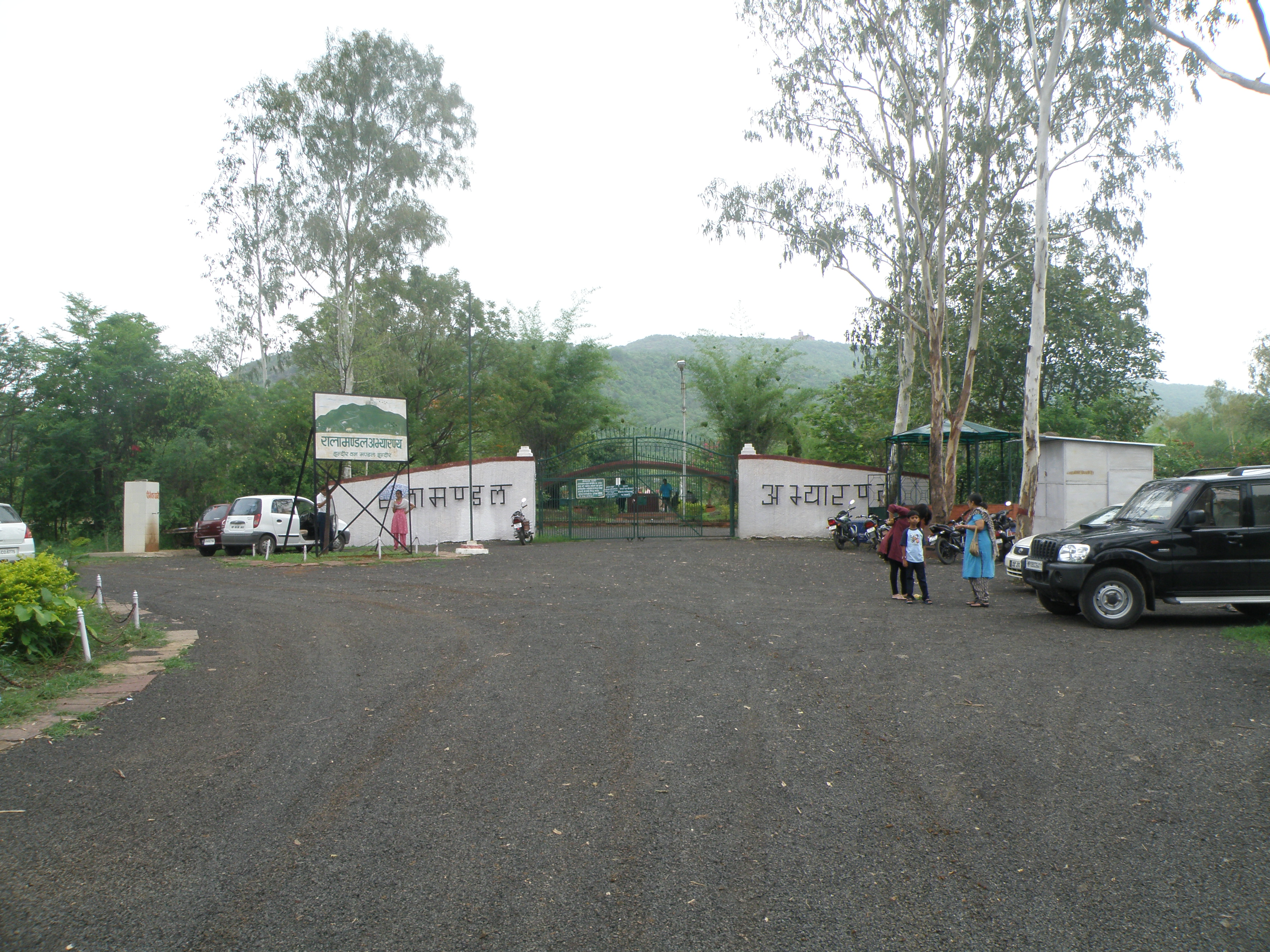
- Entrance to Ralamandal sanctuary, near Indore

- Location within Madhya Pradesh Location within India
- Interactive map of Ralamandal Wildlife Sanctuary
- Location: Indore, Madhya Pradesh, India
- Coordinates: 22.649501°N 75.918011°E
- Area: 5 km^{2} (1.9 sq mi)
- Established: 1989

The Ralamandal Wildlife Sanctuary was established in 1989 in Indore, Madhya Pradesh. It is spread over five square kilometers and is home to different species of birds and other wildlife. It has an ancient palace built by Holkar which was primarily used as a hunting hut also known as shikargah (hunting lodge). .

== About ==
Long back, the place served as a hunting ground for the royal family members of Holkar as it had a huge population of tigers, leopards and deers. In order to protect animals and birds from noise and air pollution emanating from nearby highway, a green wall of about 10,000 trees was created. It is 180 meters long and 6 meters wide.

== Fauna and flora ==
The majority of the Fauna includes Leopard, Black Buck, Sambar, Chital, Blue bull, Jarak, Bhedki (Barking deer) Rabbit etc. while Teak, Saja, Chandan, Eucalyptus, Babul, Bamboo etc. are among the popular available Flora.
