= Bharia people =

Tribe of Madhya Pradesh in India

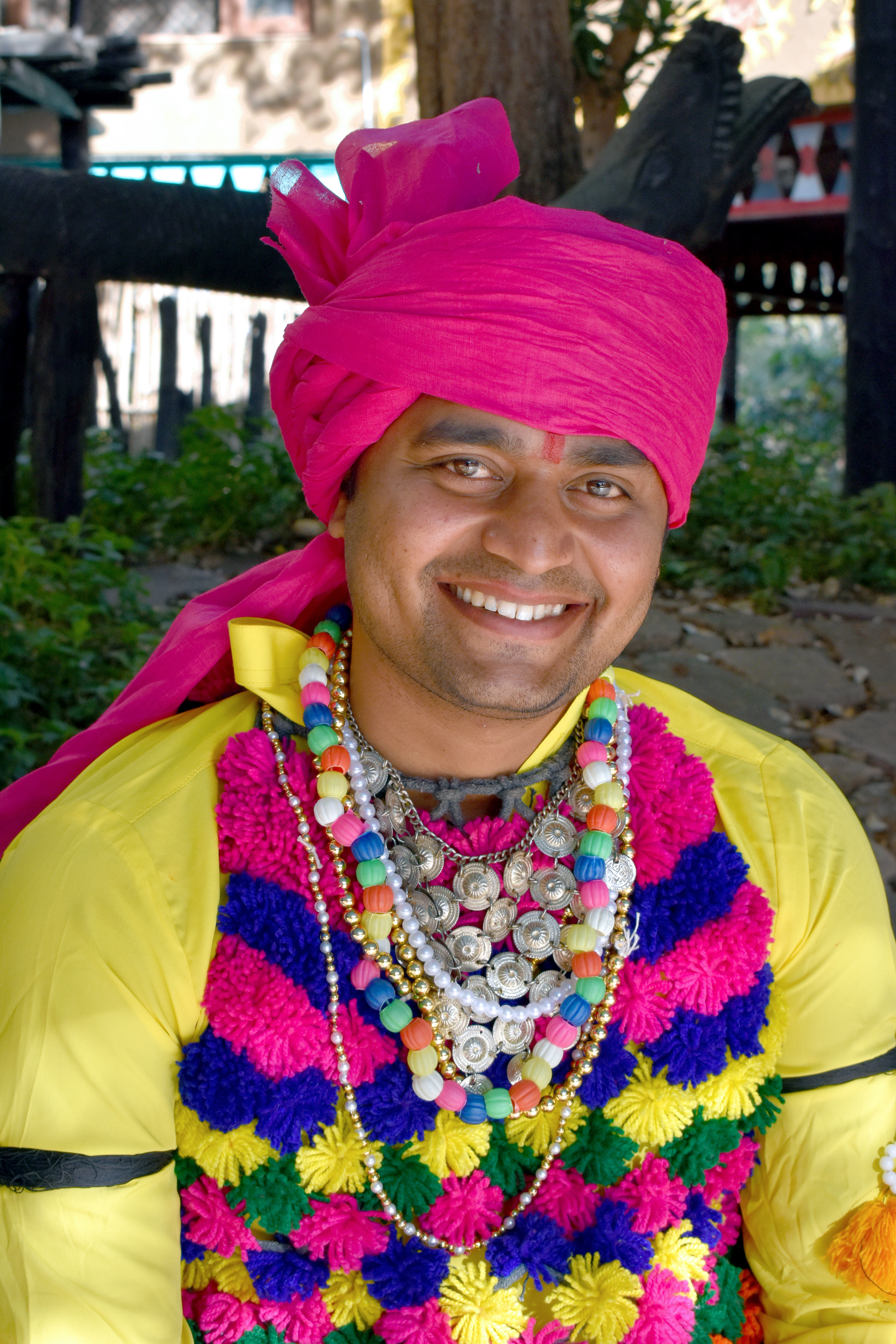
A member of Bharia tribe of Madhya Pradesh, India.

Bharia is one of the tribes of Madhya Pradesh in India. They are classified as a particularly vulnerable tribal group, associating themselves close to Gonds. Although they are originally Dravidian, they speak an Indo-Aryan language called Bhariati, which is though sometimes classified as Dravidian. The Bharias live in Patalkot, which is completely isolated valley some 400 metres below Tamia in Chhindwara district of Madhya Pradesh. This valley is the source of Dudhi River. Patalkot is totally inaccessible by road and one enters along a footpath only; recently the Madhya Pradesh government established good road inside the Patalkot valley.

There are hundreds of medicinal plant species in the Patalkot valley, and the Bharias have a deep knowledge of the herbs and medicinal plants growing within their valley. Herbal healers from Bharia community are known as Bhagats. Their society is largely centred around hunting and fishing.

== See also ==
- Bharia language
