= Panna National Park =

National Park in India

- IUCN category II (national park)
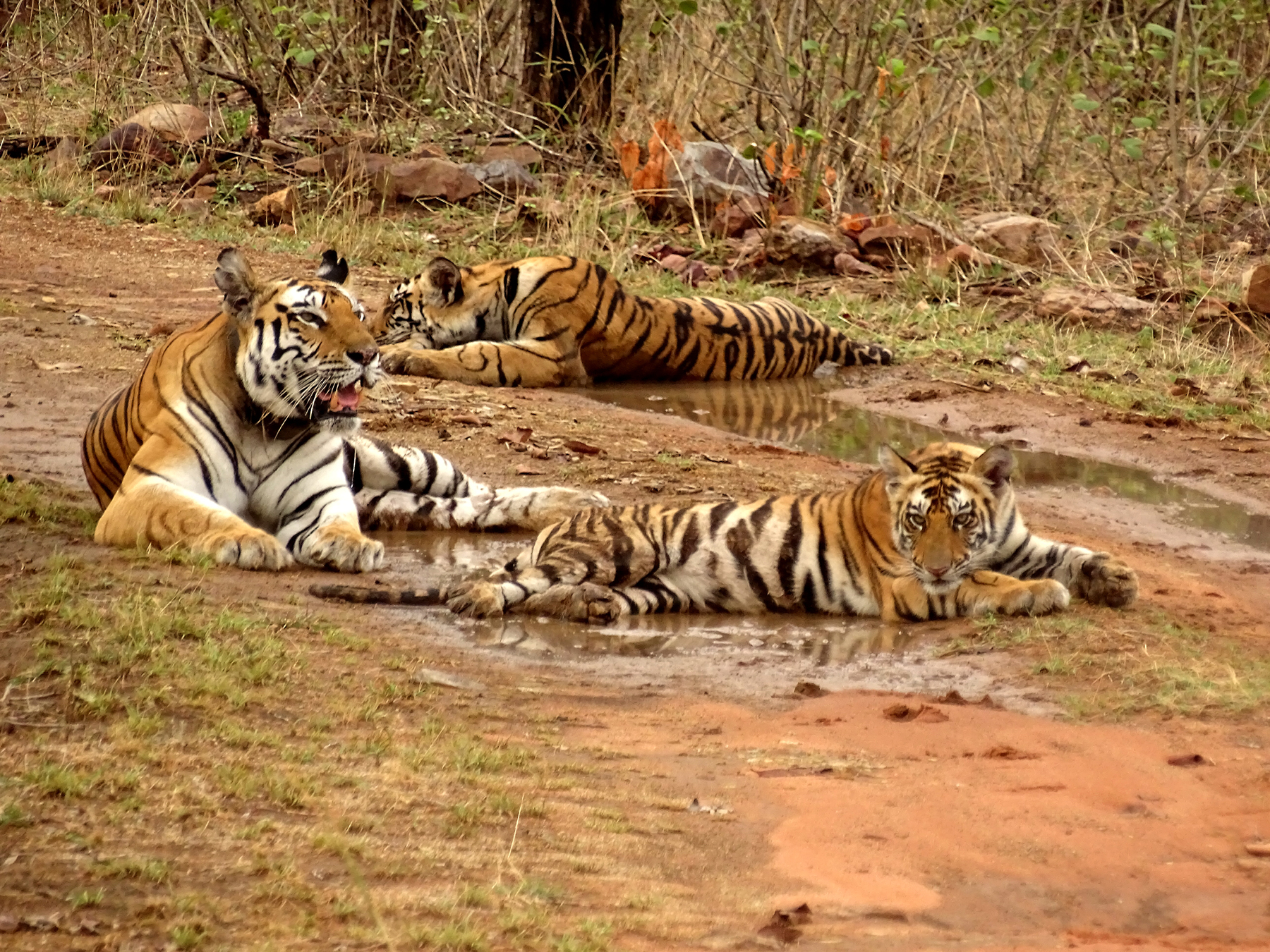
- Bengal tigers at Panna National Park

- Location within Madhya Pradesh Location within India
- Interactive map of Panna National Park
- Location: Panna and Chhatarpur districts, Madhya Pradesh, India
- Nearest city: Panna, Khajuraho, Chhatarpur (25 km (16 mi))
- Coordinates: 24°43′49.6″N 80°0′38.8″E
- Area: 542.67 km^{2} (209.53 sq mi)
- Established: 1981
- Visitors: 22,563 (in 2009)
- Governing body: Government of India, Ministry of Environment and Forests, Project Tiger, Madhya Pradesh

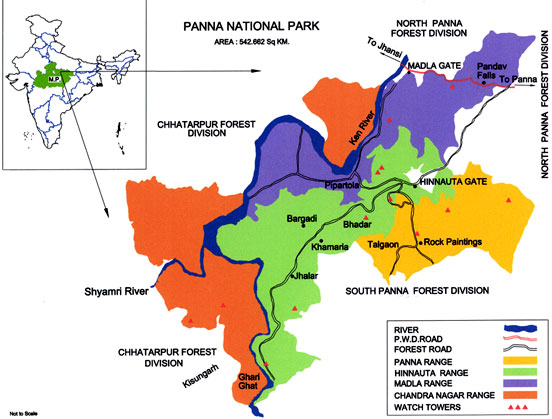
Map of Panna National Park

Panna National Park is a national park in Panna and Chhatarpur Districts in the Indian state of Madhya Pradesh with an area of 542.67 km^{2} (209.53 sq mi). It was declared in 1994 as the twenty second Tiger reserve of India and the fifth in Madhya Pradesh. Panna National Park was given the Award of Excellence in 2007 as the best maintained national park of India by the Ministry of Tourism of India. Although the reserve went through an ordeal losing almost all of its tigers in 2009 to poaching, a subsequent recovery program touted as one of the most successful big cat population restorations, has resulted in a growth of up to 80 tigers within the park.

== Geography ==
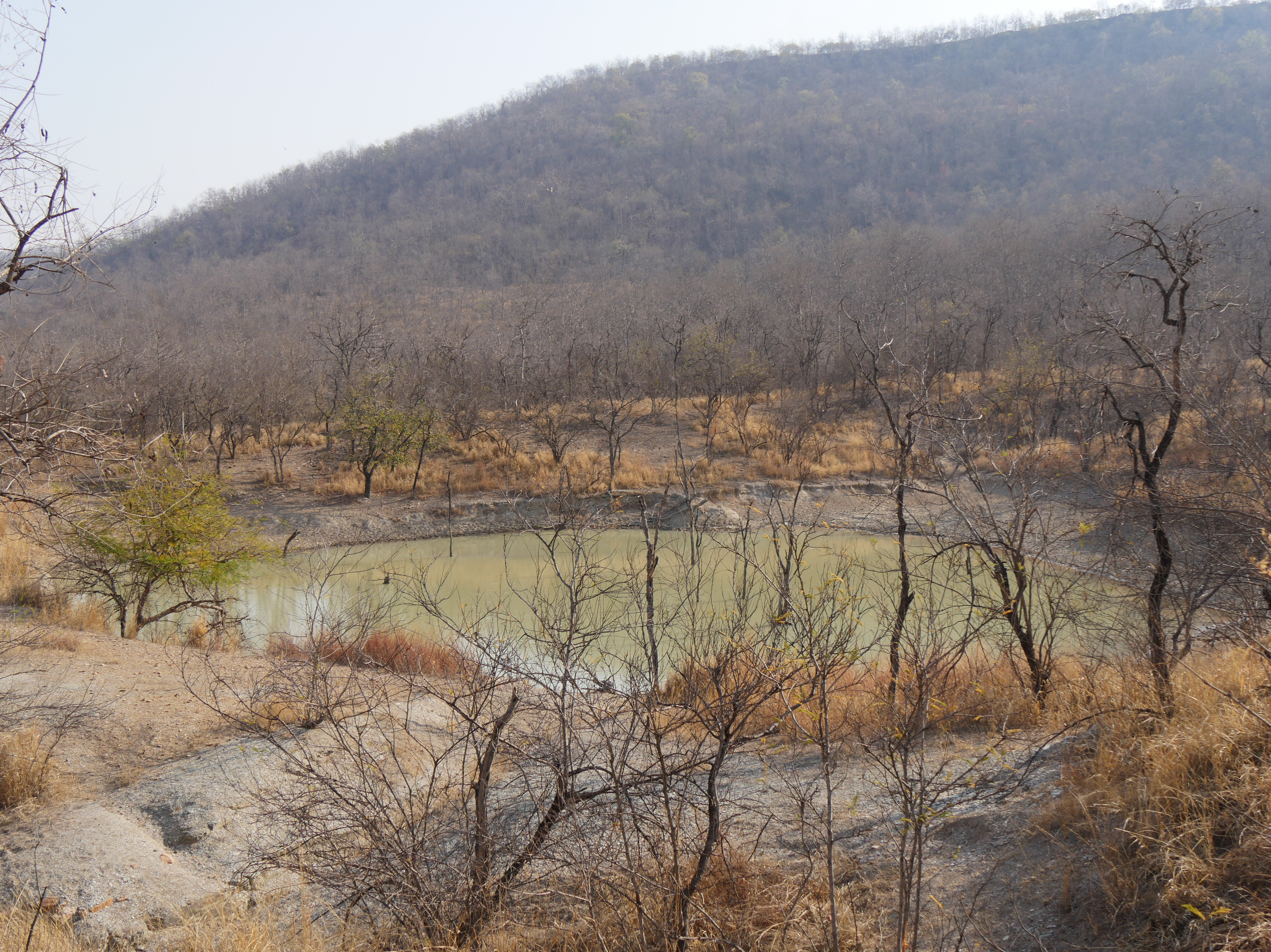
Landscape of Panna National Park

The forests of Panna National Park along with Ken Gharial Sanctuary and adjoining territorial divisions form a significant part of the drainage basin of the 406 km (252 mi) long Ken River, which runs northeast for about 72 km (45 mi) through the national park.

Panna National Park and the surrounding forest area of North and South Panna forest divisions are the only large chunk of wildlife habitat remaining in northern Madhya Pradesh. It is situated at a point where the continuity of the tropical and subtropical dry broadleaf forests belt is broken, and beyond this, the Upper Gangetic Plains moist deciduous forests of the great Indo-Gangetic Plain begin. This area is the northernmost tip of the natural teak forests and the easternmost tip of the natural 'Kardhai' Anogeissus pendula forests.

== Fauna ==
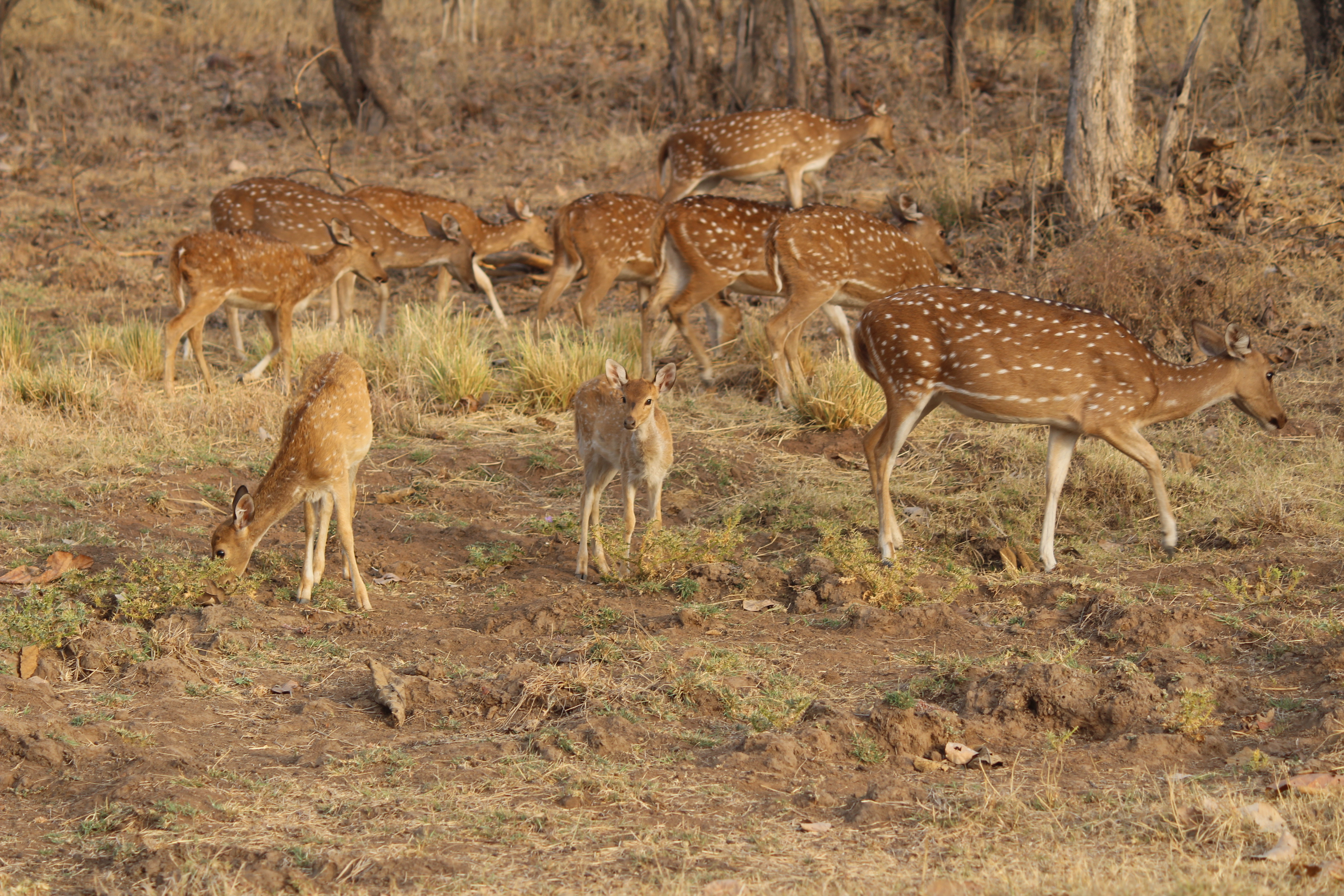
Spotted deer herd

Among the animals found here are the Bengal tiger, Indian leopard, chital, chinkara, nilgai, Sambar deer and sloth bear, rusty-spotted cat, Asian palm civet. The park is home to more than 200 species of birds including the bar-headed goose, crested honey buzzard, red-headed vulture, plum-headed parakeet, changeable hawk-eagle and Indian vulture.

== Tiger Reserve ==
Panna National Park was declared as one of the Tiger reserves of India in 2007 and placed under the protection of Project Tiger.

Two female tigers were relocated there from Bandhavgarh National Park and Kanha National Park in March 2009. However, the last male tiger had already disappeared. A committee to look into the disappearance of the tigers was formed. In June 2009, it was officially announced that the Reserve, which had over 40 tigers six years earlier, had no tigers left and only two tigresses, which were brought in a little earlier In February 2012, only three years later, the entire tiger population of the reserve was considered eliminated. The Madhya Pradesh government did not determine responsibility for the debacle, nor did it pass the inquiry to the Central Bureau of Investigation in spite of requests from the Ministry of Environment and Forests and the Prime Minister's Office.

The Ministry of Environment and Forests approved a proposal to translocate two tigers and two tigresses to the reserve. One female each from Bandhavgarh National Park (coded T1) and Kanha National Park (T2) were translocated to Panna Tiger Reserve. A tiger male, coded T3, was brought from Pench Tiger Reserve but strayed out of the park shortly thereafter, in November 2009 The tiger started walking towards its home in Pench National Park, indicating homing instinct. It moved steadily through human dominated landscape without causing any conflict. Forest department staff tracked it continuously for over a month and finally brought it back to Panna Tiger Reserve. It then settled well, established territory and started mating. The tigress, T1, translocated from Bandhavgarh National Park, gave birth to four cubs in April 2010 of which 2 survive till date. The second tigress, T2, translocated from Kanha National Park gave birth to four cubs several months later and all four survive till date. A third tigress, coded T4, an orphaned cub was reintroduced to Panna in March 2011. She learnt hunting skills with the help of the male and mated with him. She was found dead on 19 September 2014 of an infection caused by its radio collar. Her sister T5 was released in Panna in November 2011.

== Panna Biosphere Reserve ==
Panna Biosphere Reserve was designated in 2020 by UNESCO and encompasses a total area of 2,998.98 km^{2} (1,157.91 sq mi) including Panna National Park, three sections of Gangau Wildlife Sanctuary (I, III and IV) and reserved and protected forests of the North Panna Forest Division with over 300 villages, forests, woodlands, wetlands and farms. Its 792.53 km^{2} (306.00 sq mi) large core area is surrounded by a 987.2 km^{2} (381.2 sq mi) buffer zone and a 1,219.25 km^{2} (470.76 sq mi) transition zone.

== Effect of Ken Betwa River Linking Project ==
The Government of India along with Government of Madhya Pradesh and Government of Uttar Pradesh have planned to link the Ken River with Betwa River. This involves construction of 283m long Daudhan Dam. The project aims to transfer excess water from Ken basin to Betwa basin thus provide water access to the drought prone region of Bundelkhand.

This construction will cause inundation of 400 hectares of land of 4300 hectare Panna Tiger reserve. Environmentalist are afraid that this will adversely affect the population of tigers in the region.

== See also ==
- Panpatha Wildlife Sanctuary
