= Patalkot, India =

Valley in Madhya Pradesh, India

Patalkot (Sanskrit for "Very Deep") is a valley in the Tamia tehsil of Chhindwara district in Madhya Pradesh, India. Patalkot is 78 km away from Chhindwara district headquarter. This valley is home to a tribal culture and enormous herbal wealth.

== Geography ==
The Patalkot valley is spread over an area of 79 km^{2}. at an average height of 2750–3250 feet above Mean Sea Level from 22.24 to 22.29 ° North and 78.43 to 78.50 ° East. The valley is located at a distance of 78 km from Chhindwara in the North-West direction and 20 km from Tamia in the North-East Direction. 'Doodhi' river flows in the valley. This horse–shoe shaped valley is surrounded by hills and there are several pathways to reach the villages located inside the valley. The rocks are mostly by the Archaean era which are nearly 2500 million years and comprised with Granite gneiss, green schists, basic rocks, quartz with Gondwana sediments including conglomerate sandstone, shales and carbonaceous shales. The composite carbon on the rocks called Shilajit is also found on few patches in upper zones.

== History ==
'Patalkot' name comes from Sanskrit word "Patal" that means very deep. There is a belief that after worshipping Lord Shiva, Prince Meghnad son of Ravana had gone to Patal-lok through this place only. People say that Bhonsle Kings ruled this place in the 18th and 19th Centuries and that there was a long tunnel connecting this place to Pachmarhi in Hoshangabad District. The Bhonsle King after defeated by British Army found this place suitable for hiding and went deep into the forest of Patalkot. The area is called Rajakho in Patalkot. Traditionally, the site is believed to be the entrance to Patal. This valley had long been cut off from the outside and was discovered only a few years back. Patalkot has been a home to a tribal culture and custom since its origin.

== Tourism ==
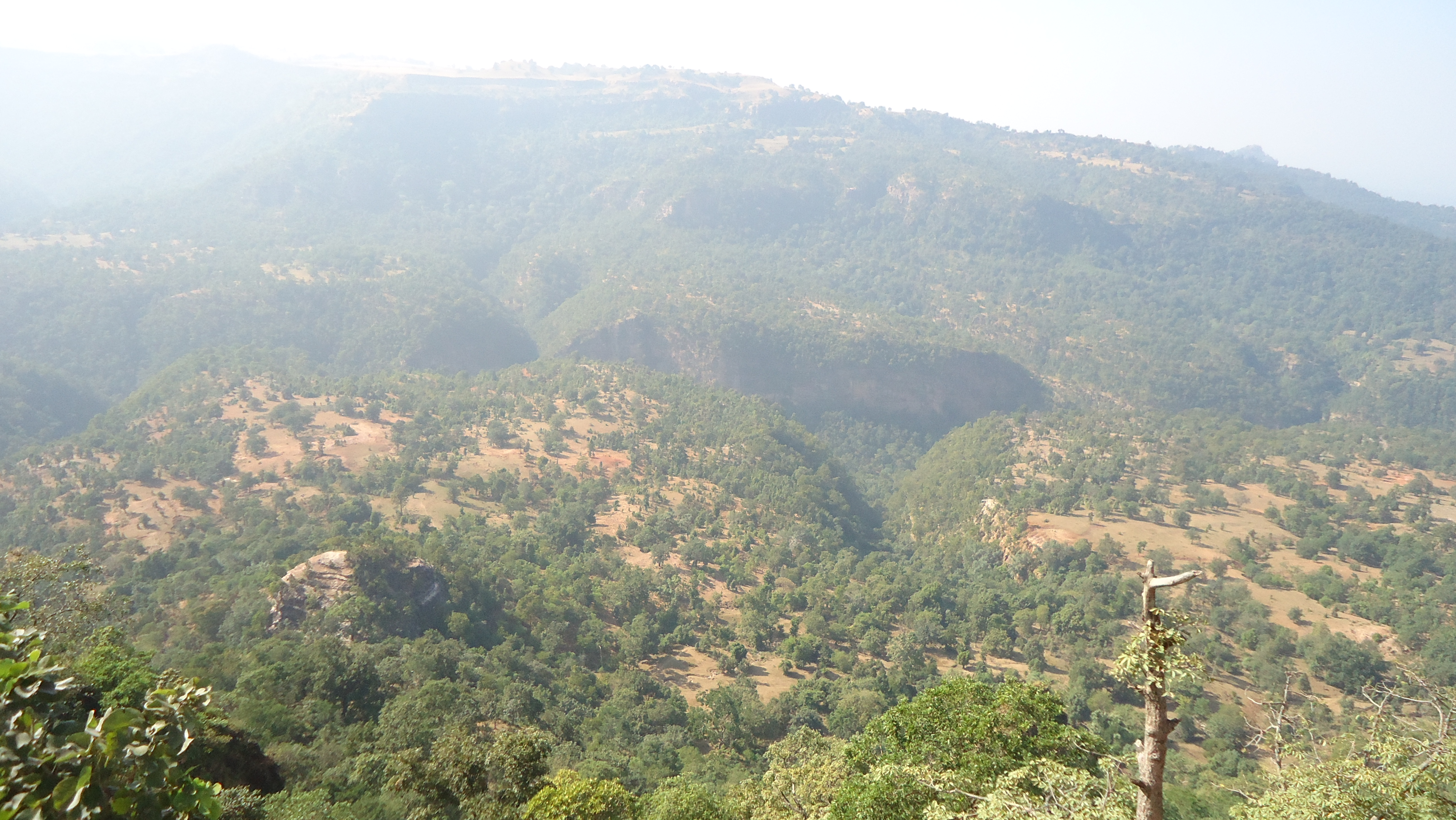
Aerial view of Patalkot

In recent years, the government has been trying to make Patalkot an eco-tourism destination. The monsoon season is a popular time for visitors, as it is a sheltered area. Tourism marketing focuses on the local nature and adivasi culture connections - though this may change with increased impact from tourism and outside pressures. Patalkot is known for retaining its original culture and customs for a long time. Until a few years back, it was a world in its own with no influence from outside. To reverse the process of deforestation and forest degradation by positioning in ecotourism as a joint product. The Patalkot model of ecotourism, with the involvement of indigenous communities, has demonstrated its operational deliverance, adaptive evolution capabilities as well as being recognized as a successful model with several elements for replication. It started in 2009 with the joint effort of the 'Centre for Forestry Research' and HRD Poama, District Administration and District Olympic Association in which 3000 tribal youth were trained in adventure activities like parasailing, paragliding, rock climbing, trekking, bird watching and water sports. Every year a festival called Satpuda Adventure sports festival is organised during the month of October.

This deep valley is situated on the way to Bhopal from Chhindwara. Patalkot is 78 km away from Chhindwara, on a diversion route towards Tamia. It can be reached through taxi from Chhindwara. There is no facility of accommodation in the valley, the nearest accommodation facility is in Tamia at the forest or PWD guest house and few private hotels can be booked.

== Culture ==
There are in total 12 villages and 13 hamlets with a total population of 2012 (1017 male and 995 female) in the valley. These villages are located at the distance of 2–3 km each. The main villages of the valley are: Rated, Chimtipur, Gujja Dongri, Sahra Pachgol, Harra-ka-Char, Sukhabhand, Dhurni malni, Jhiram, Palani Gaildubba, Ghatlinga, Gudichattri, Gaildubba, Kareyam, Ghana, etc.

Gonds (Gondi people) and Bharias mainly constitute the population of Patalkot. It is said that Bharias have been living here for more than 500 years. Tribal men, women and children wear traditional dresses during their festive times. Chulki, Mundri, Binoria, Toda, Hasli, Kardona, Paijan, Mohanmala, Kushmala, Mungiamala, Markadhana mala and Patli are the common ornaments they wear at this time. Tribal members perform prayers and rituals every day. The place where they perform Pooja (prayer) is called as Devghar. Tribals worship Mahadev, Badadev, Madai, Madmi Mai, Doolhadev, Nandia, Surjadev, Agiadev as their gods and goddesses. Nagda, Timki, Shehnai, Chakule, Singa, Tambura, Chikara, Bansuri, Ghunghru, Khadtaal, Madar, Dhol, Dahak and Tudiya are the common instruments played during certain ceremonies and rituals.

As mentioned by Dr Deepak Acharya in an article published in ECOS MAGAZINE- Australia Wisdom from the Heart of India, Patalkot is home to a tribal culture and custom. The valley now faces threats of deforestation.

== Medicines and Herbs ==
Patalkot is the home of some rare medicinal plants and herbs, used by herbal healers known as bhumka. They include Abrus precatorius, Aloe vera, Annona squamosa, Bryonia lacinosa, Aegle marmelos, Madhuca indica, Ficus racemosa, Holoptelea integrifolia, Lawsonia enermis, Tylophora asthmatica, Gloriosa superba, Gymnema sylvestre, Hemidesmus indicus, etc. The tribes of Patalkot use the forest plants to make medicines. The herbal practitioners are known as Bhumkas. They make pulps and extracts of plants for curing illnesses. They have medicinal treatments intended to aid with illnesses including, measles, cholera, hypertension, diabetes, coughs, snake bites, and pains (Acharya and Shrivastava, 2008). The ethnobotanical studies done by Dr.Suneesh Buxy in the area revealed that nearly 220 number of floral population are used by Bharia community for treating different diseases. Some of the medicinal plants are highly endangered species and needs protection like Sundew.

Due to the exposure of Patalkot's herbal remedies and plants to the outside world, the eco-balance of the valley is in question. The system of the valley that encompasses several villages and their lives has been self-sustained over a long period of time.
