= Tourism in Madhya Pradesh =

Tourism in Madhya Pradesh has been an attraction of India because of its location in the centre of the country. Madhya Pradesh has won Best Tourism State National award for 3 consecutive years i.e. 2017, 2016 and 2015.

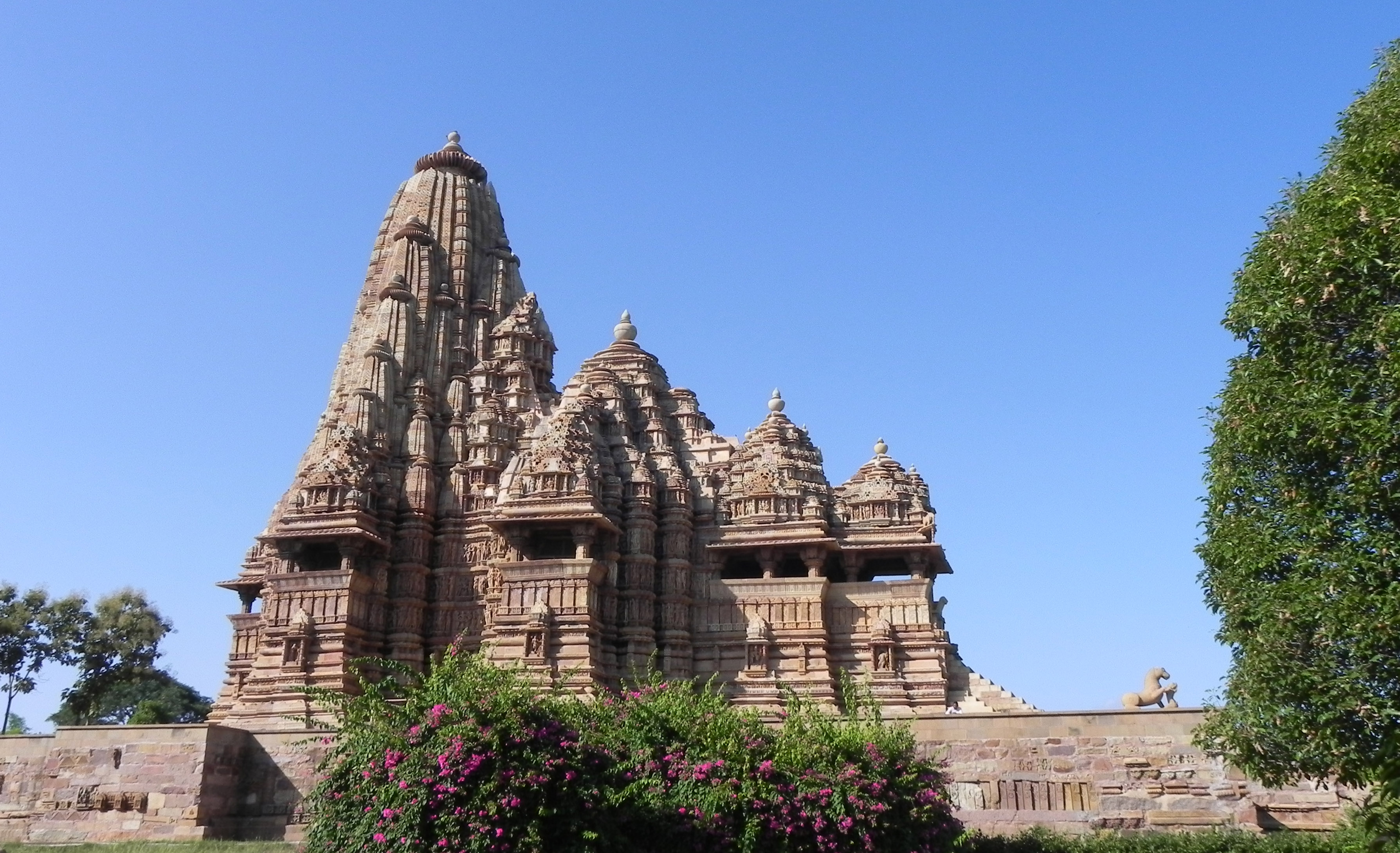
Kandariya Mahadeva Temple, Khajuraho Temple Complex, a UNESCO World Heritage

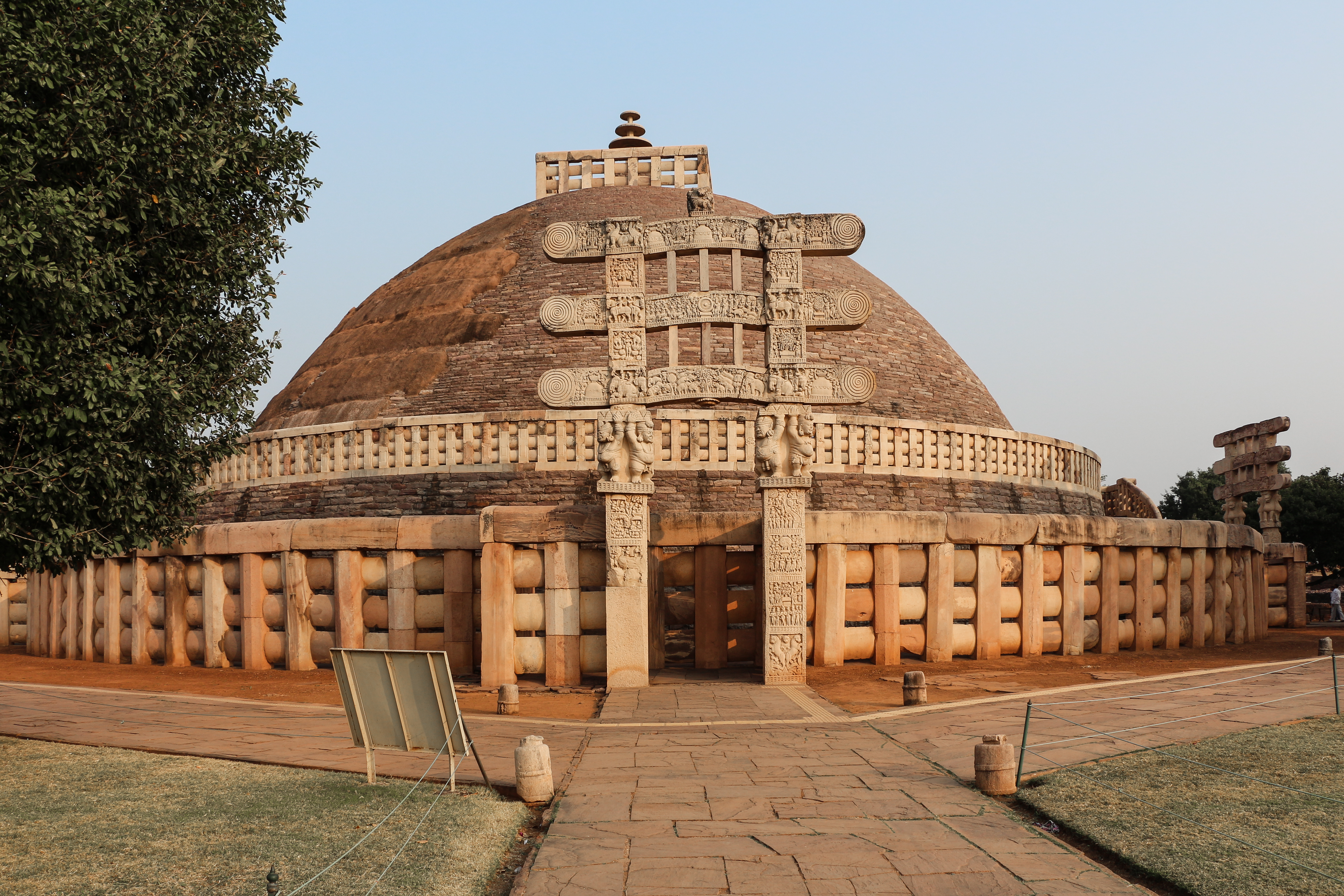
Sanchi Stupa, a UNESCO World Heritage Site

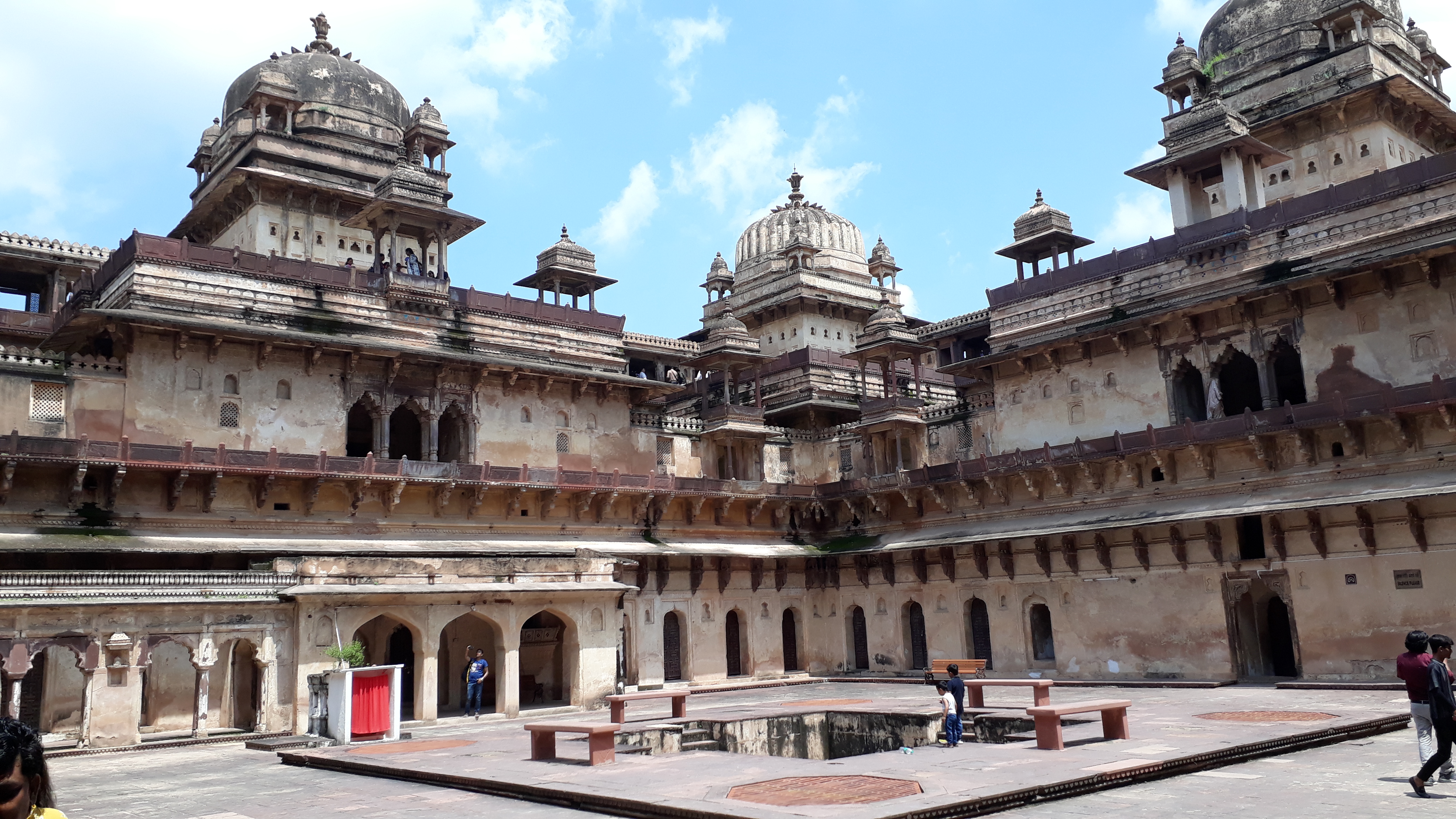
Orchha Fort complex

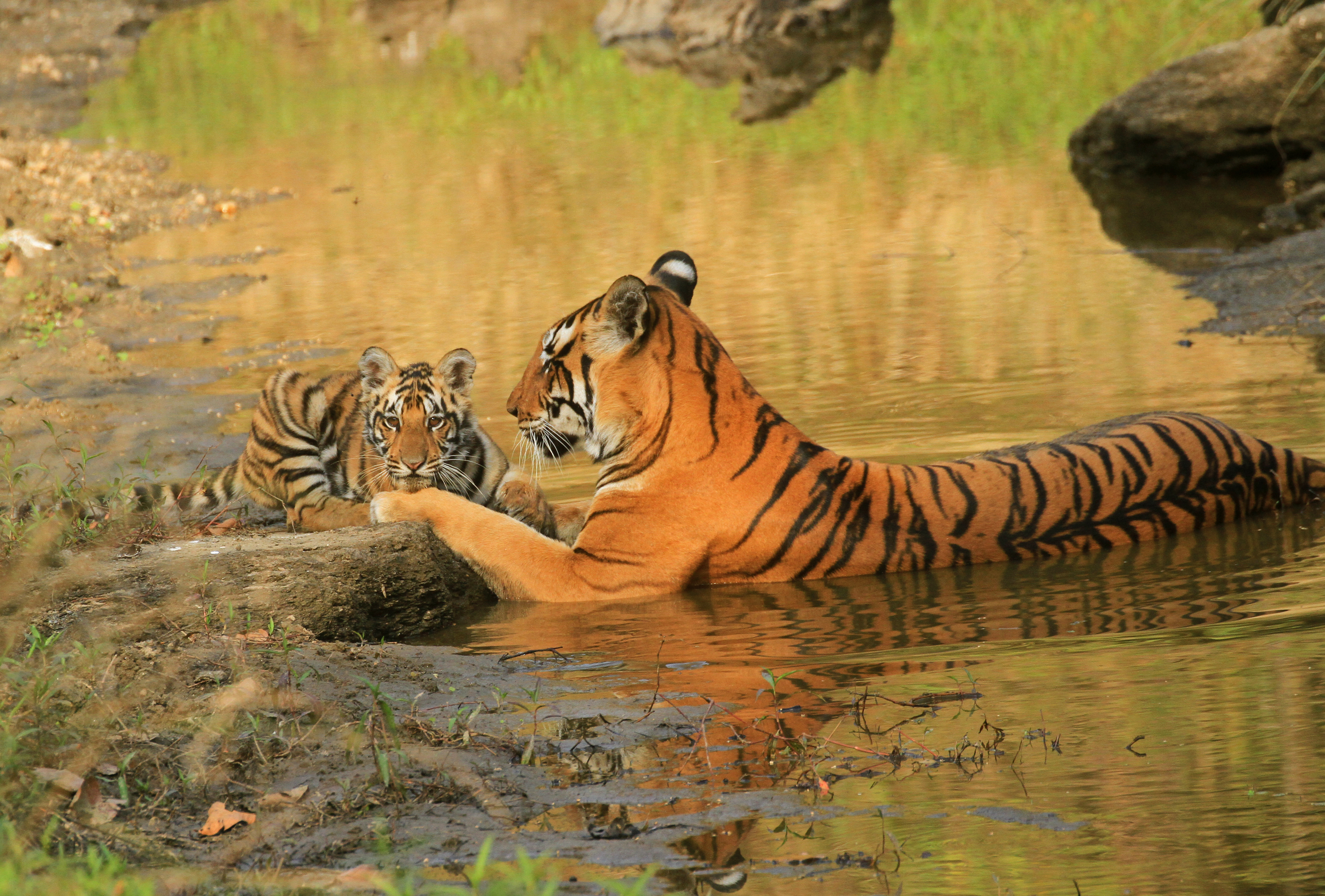
Tigers in Kanha National Park

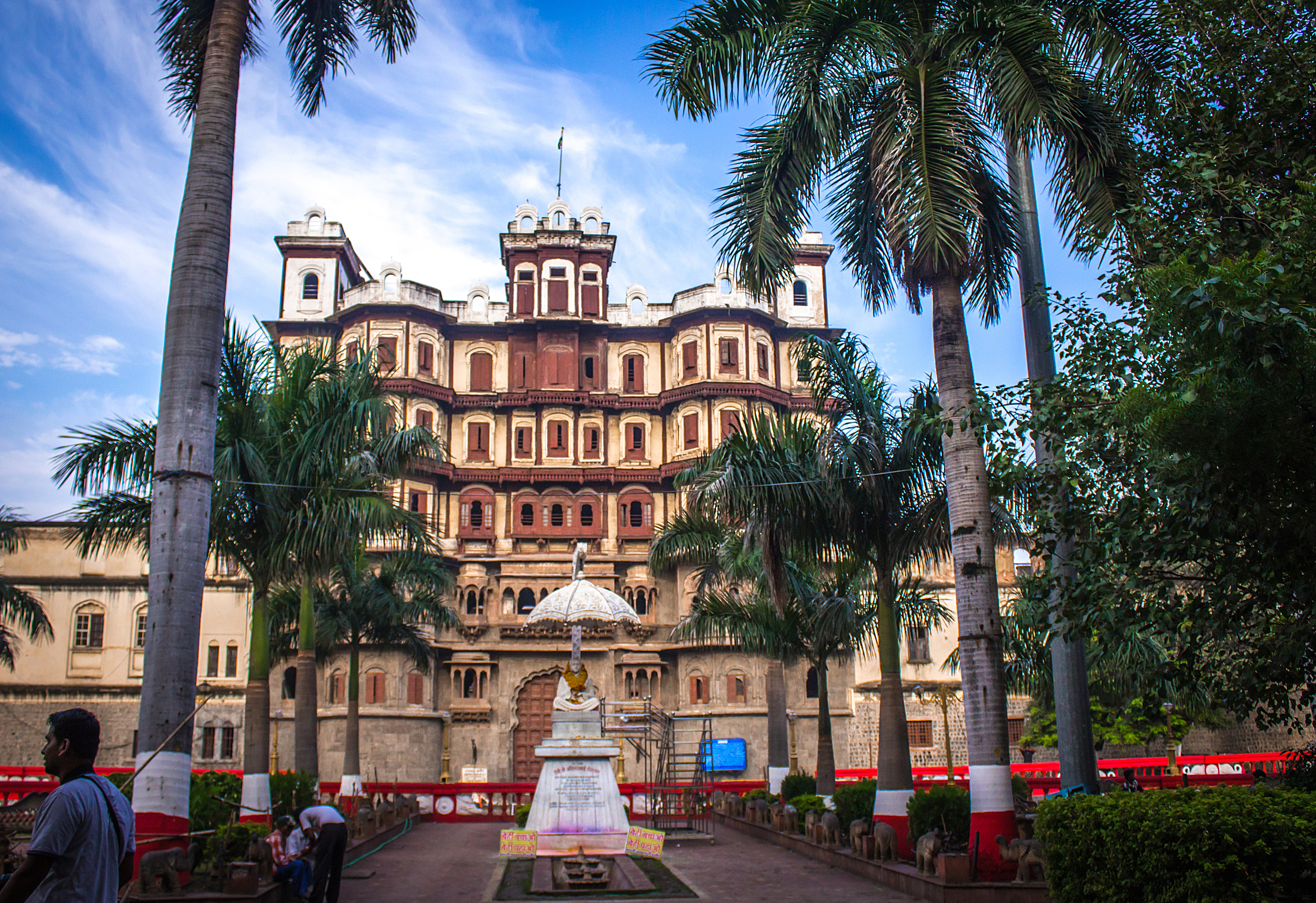
Rajwada, Indore

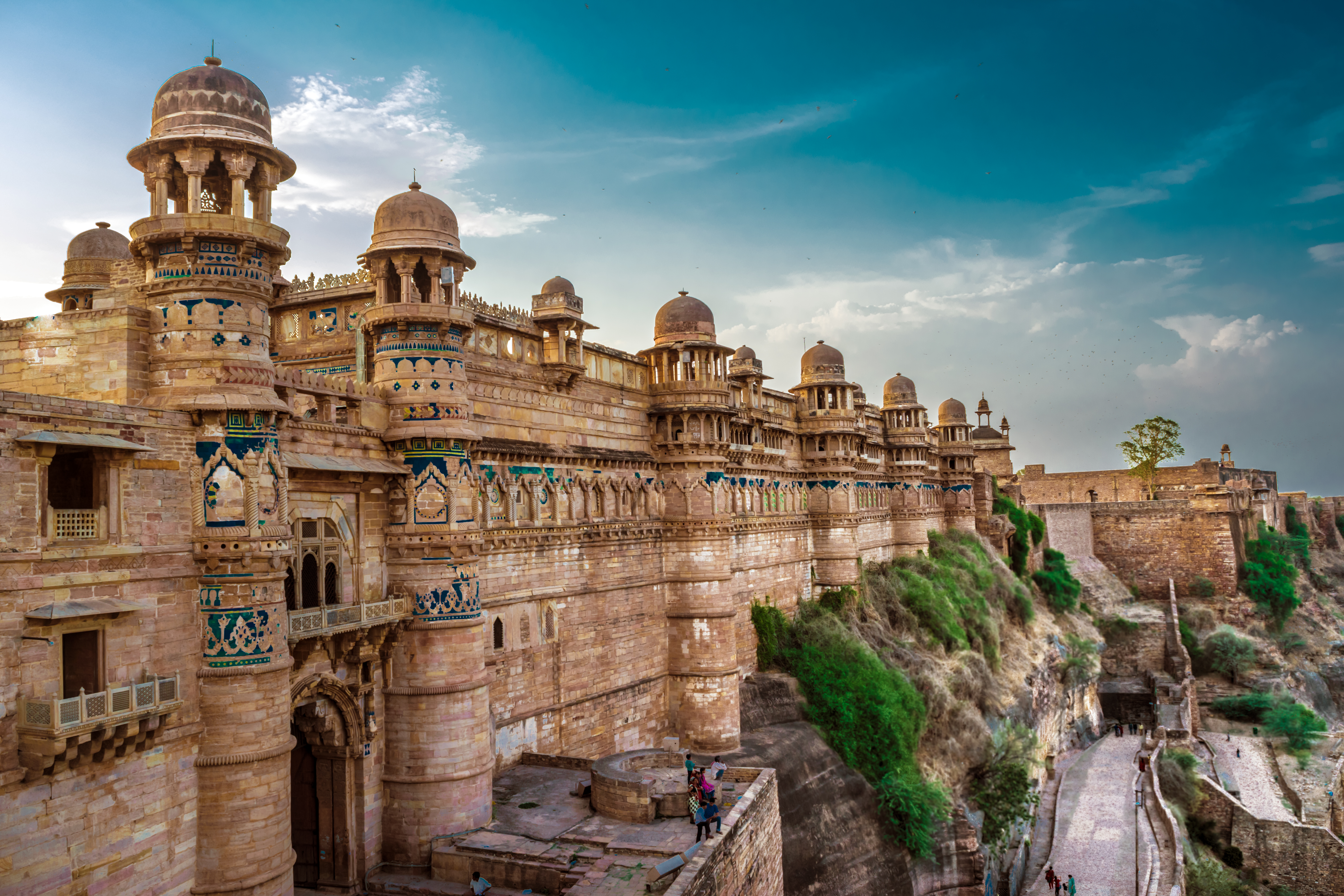
Gwalior Fort, Gwalior

== Natural environment ==
The natural environment of Madhya Pradesh is varied. Consisting largely of a plateau streaked with the mountain ranges of the Vindhyas and the Satpuras, the hills give rise to the main river system - Narmada and the Tapti, running from east to west, and the Chambal, Sone, Betwa, Mahanadi west to east.

One half of the state is forested and offers a unique panorama of wildlife. In the National Parks of Kanha, Bandhavgarh, Shivpuri and many others visitors have the opportunity to see the tiger, the bison and a wide variety of deer and antelope in natural surroundings.

== World heritage sites ==
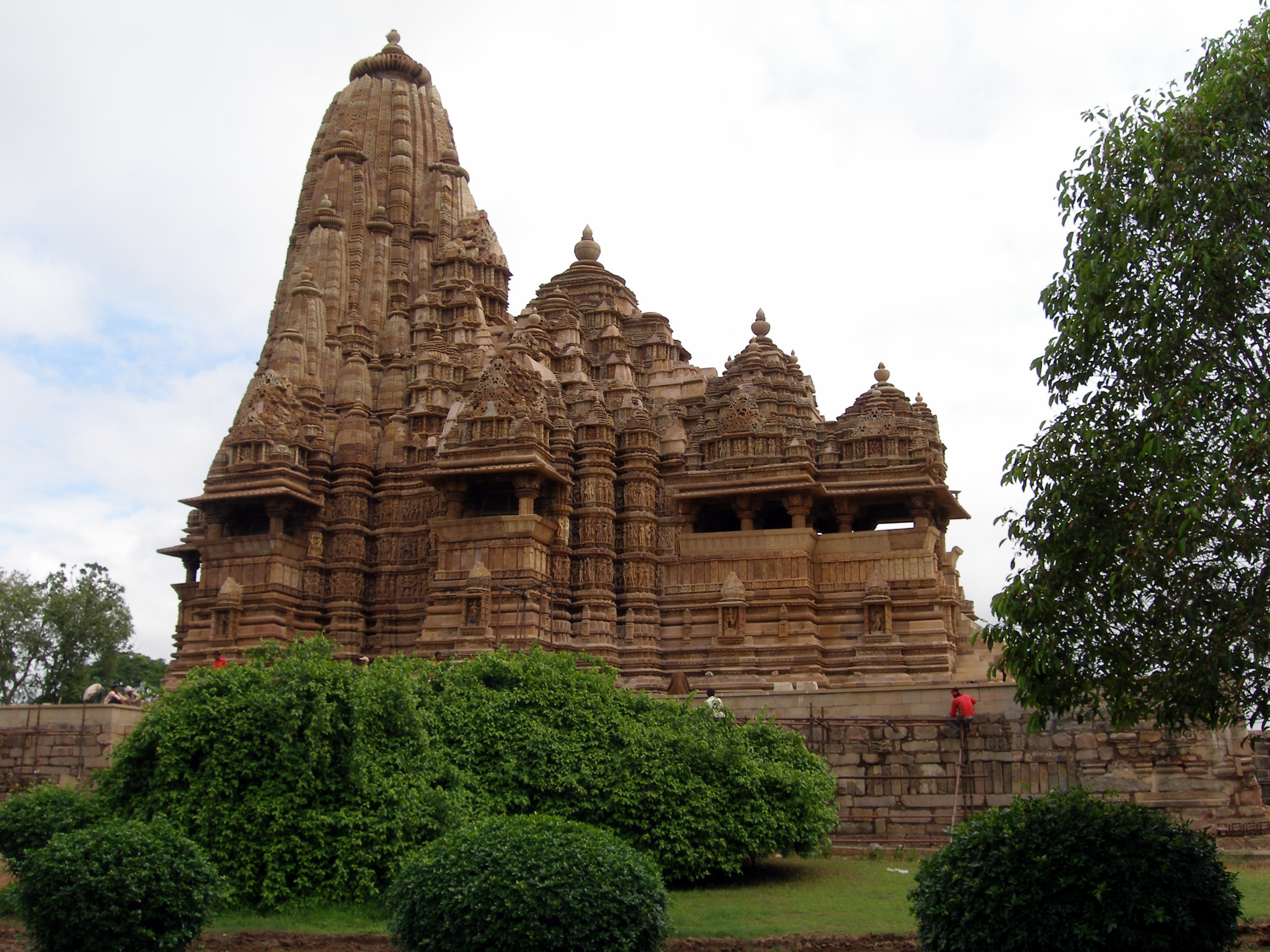
Kandariya Mahadeva Temple, largest temple in Khajuraho

Although the modern state of Madhya Pradesh came into being in 1956, its cultural heritage is ancient and chequered. Innumerable monuments, exquisitely carved temples, stupas, forts, and palaces on hilltops, raise in the visitor's mind visions of empires and kingdoms, of the great warriors and builders, poets, and musicians, saints and philosophers; of Hinduism, Buddhism, and Jainism. The famous Sanskrit poet-dramatist Kalidasa and the great musician of the Mughal court, Tansen, were from Madhya Pradesh. They are known all over the world.

Three sites in Madhya Pradesh have been declared World Heritage Sites by UNESCO:

- The Khajuraho Group of Monuments (1986)
- Buddhist Monuments at Sanchi (1989)
- The Rock Shelters of Bhimbetka (2003)
- The city of Gwalior and Orchha(2020) ( Not included as a world heritage site, pilot cities for the Historic Urban Landscape programme and survey )

== Significant sites ==
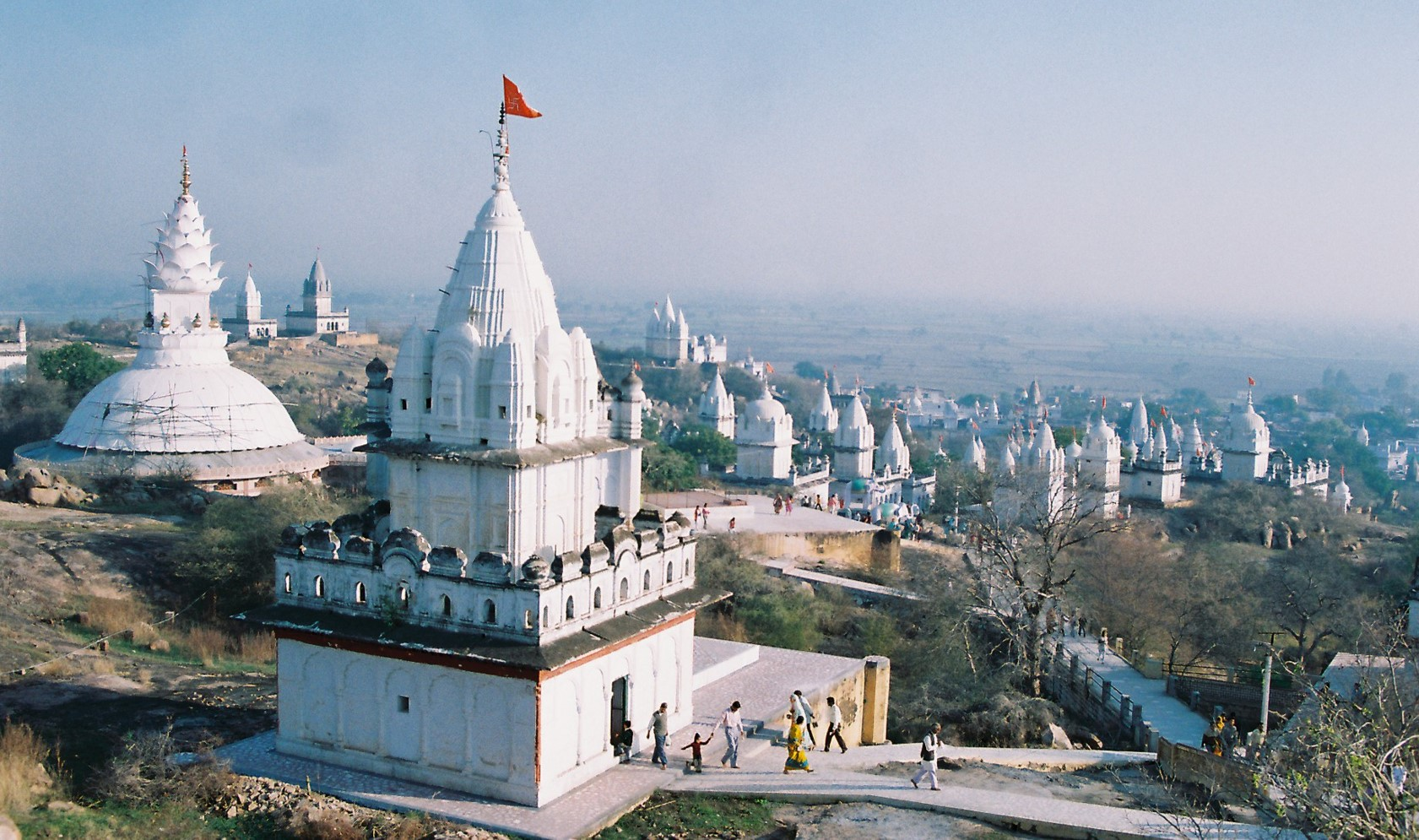
Sonagiri

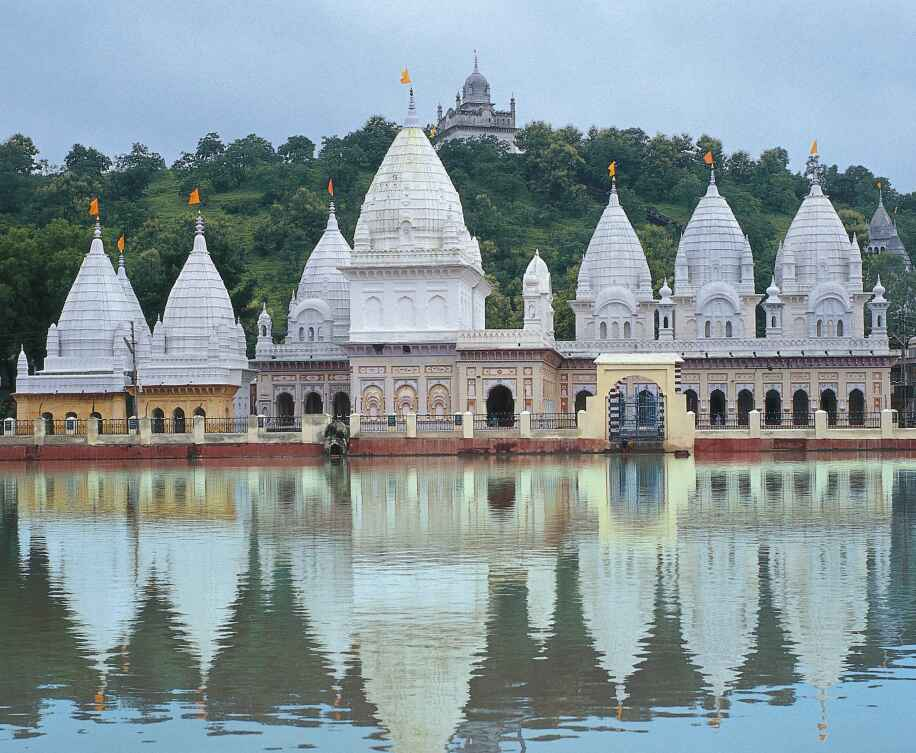
Kundalpur Jain temples

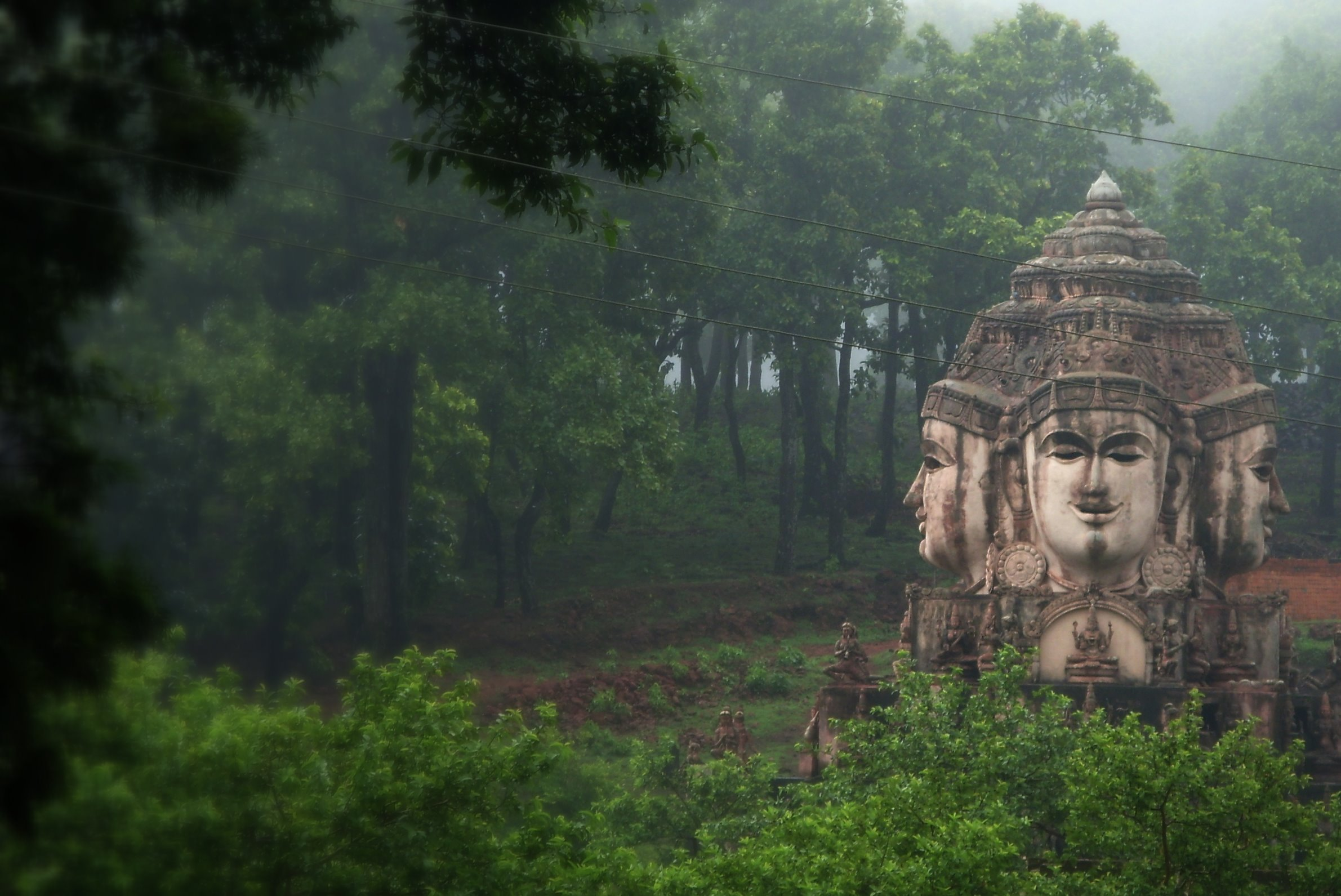
Amarkantak, a Hindu Tirtha place, a site where three rivers

Other architecturally significant or scenic sites include:

- Alampur
- Amarkantak
- Asirgarh
- Bawangaja
- Bhopal
- Chanderi
- Chitrakoot
- Chambal
- Deorkothar
- Dhar
- Gwalior
- Indore
- Jabalpur
- Maheshwar
- Mandleshwar
- Mandu
- Muktagiri
- Narsinghgarh
- Narmadapuram
- Omkareshwar
- Orchha
- Rewa
- Sailana
- Shivpuri
- Shahdol
- Sagar
- Sonagiri
- Ujjain

Madhya Pradesh being very large geographically, and the history being spread over several millennia, developing a comprehensive picture of heritage and architecture is a monumental task.

== National Parks ==
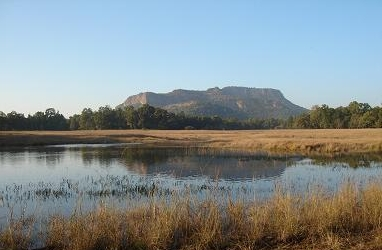
Bandhavgarh National Park

Madhya Pradesh is home to several National Parks, including:

- Bandhavgarh National Park
- Kanha National Park
- Satpura National Park
- Sanjay National Park
- Madhav National Park
- Van Vihar National Park
- Ghughua Fossil National Park
- Panna National Park
- Pench National Park
- Dinosaur Fossils National Park
- Kuno National Park

There are 11 national parks and 25 wildlife sanctuaries in Madhya Pradesh. Apart from tiger, the national parks in Madhya Pradesh have animals like Leopard, Gaur, Chital, Sambar, Nilgai, Chinkara, Barking Deer, Barasingha, Samber Deer, Wild Boar, Monkey, Peacock, etc.

== Nature reserves ==
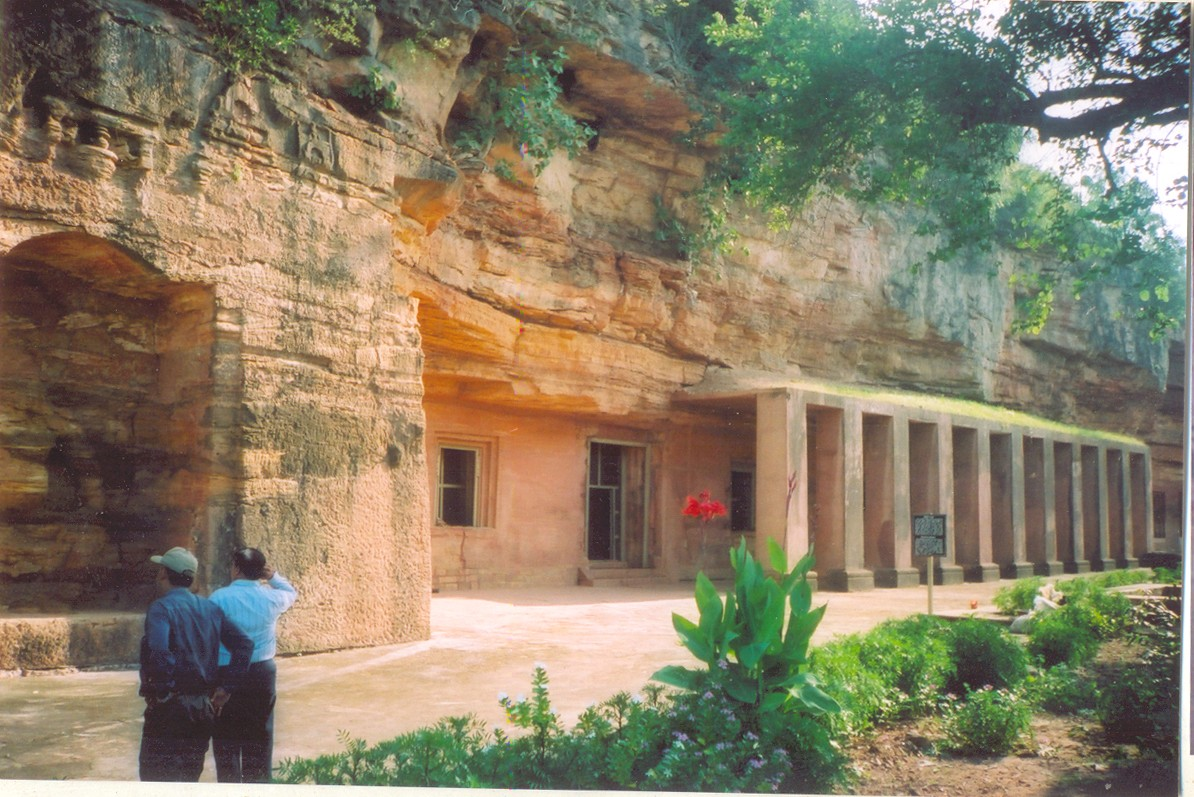
Bagh Caves

There are also a number of nature preserves, including:

- Amarkantak
- Bagdara Wildlife Sanctuary
- Bagh Caves
- Bhedaghat
- Bori Wildlife Sanctuary
- Kuno-Palpur Wildlife Sanctuary
- Dr. Bhimrao Ambedkar Wildlife Sanctuary
- Narwar
- Pachmarhi
- Chambal
- Narsinghgarh
- Orchha Wildlife Sanctuary
- Patalkot
- Parsili

== Fairs and festivals ==
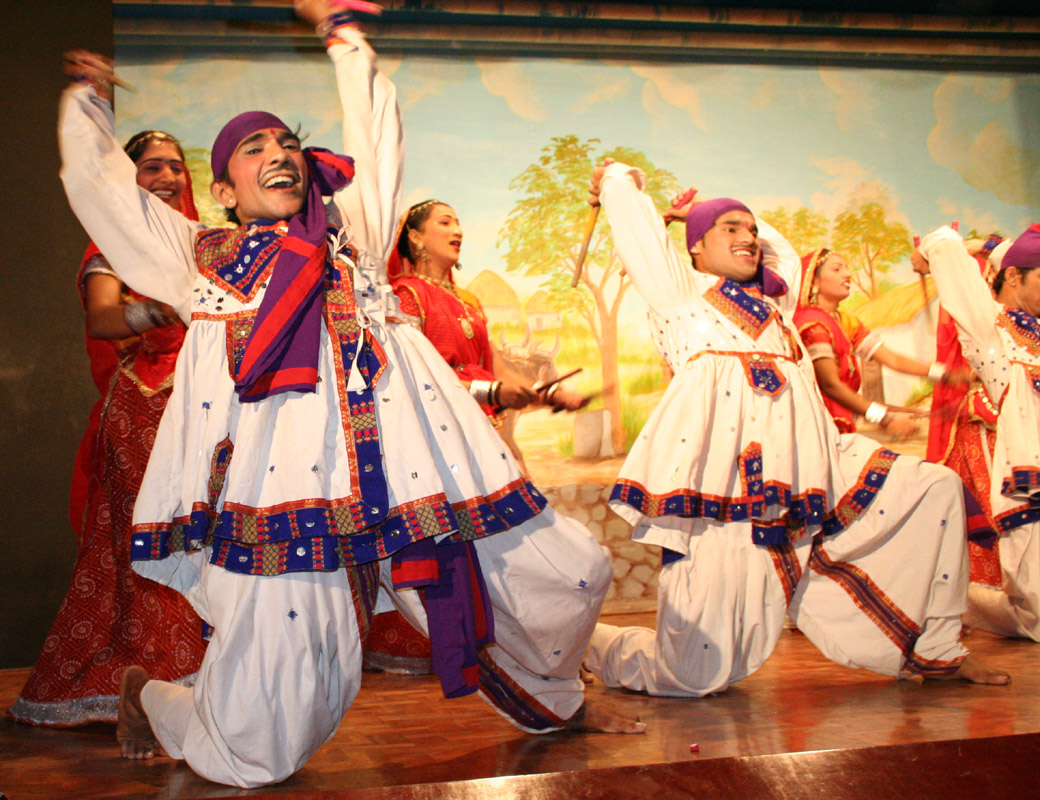
Dance Festivals in Madhya Pradesh

Customs and beliefs in each area in Madhya Pradesh have added colours to the fairs and festivals. Shivratri in Khajuraho, Bhojpur, Pachmarhi and Ujjain; Navratri and Dusshera in Jabalpur, Ramanavami in Chitrakoot and Orchha, Bhagoriya dance in Jhabua and the annual festival of dances at Khajuraho are events for the tourists to remember. The Malwa festival in Indore, Mandu and Ujjain, and the Pachmarhi festival bring alive the rich folk and tribal culture of the state in colourful celebrations. Gwalior trade fair is India's second largest trade fair. It is organised in various sectors which includes electronic sector, automobile sector, food sector, fun (jhula) sector etc. Gwalior carnival is a newly introduced festival in 2012. It was organised for 22 days in December. It is planned to organise carnival every year. Nimar Utsav takes place every year in the holy city of Maheshwar in the Hindu month of Kartika on the occasion of Kartika Purnima. The festival lasts for 3 days with a cultural programme at Ahilya Ghat in Maheshwar.

== Hill stations ==
- Pachmarhi
- Amarkantak
- Shivpuri
- Tamia
- Kukru Khamla
- Mandu

== Gallery ==
Sailana Palace, Sailana

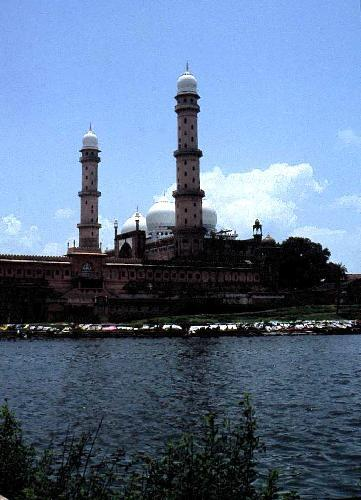
Taj-ul-Masajid, Bhopal

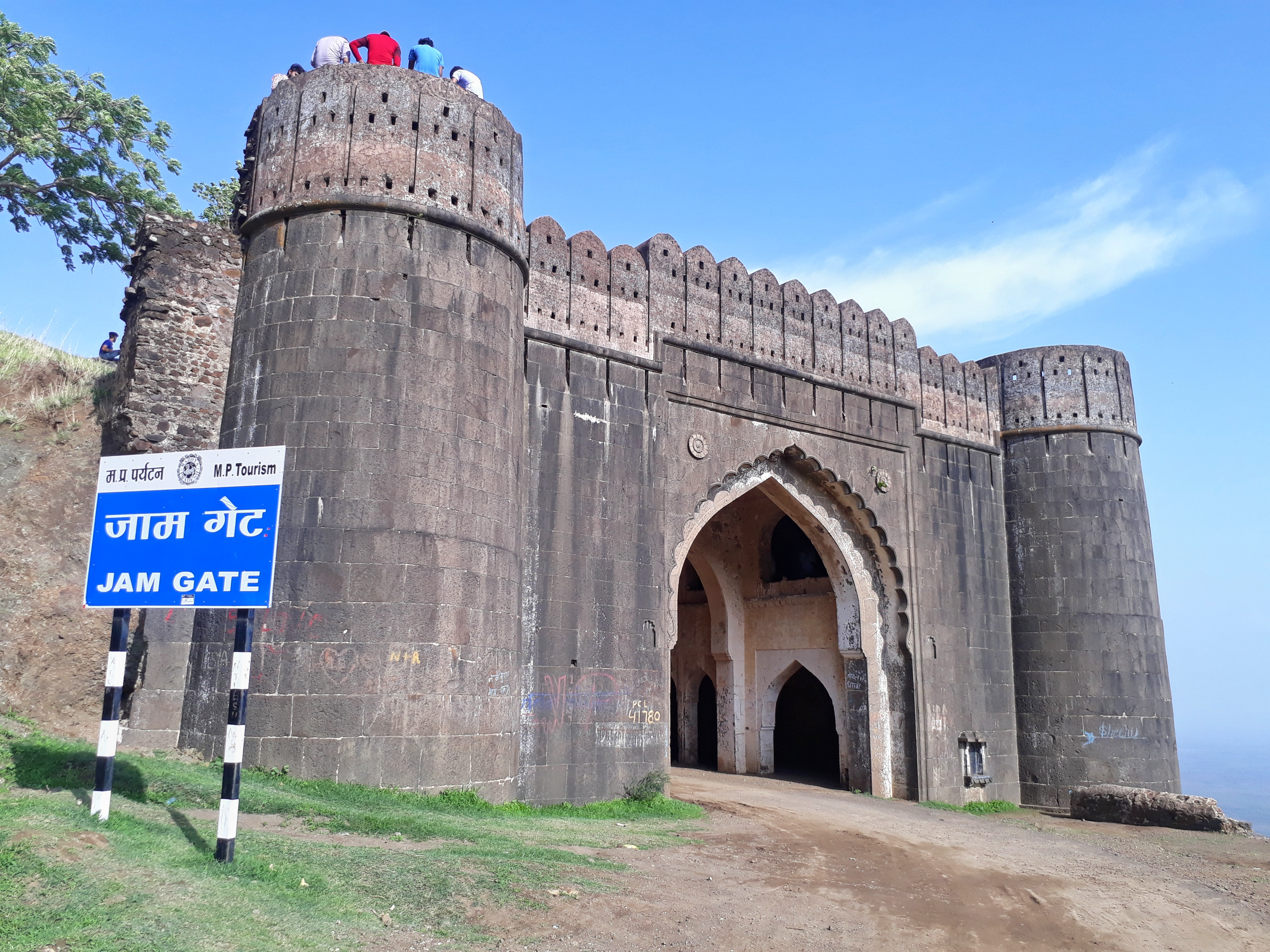
Jam Gate, Dr. Ambedkar Nagar

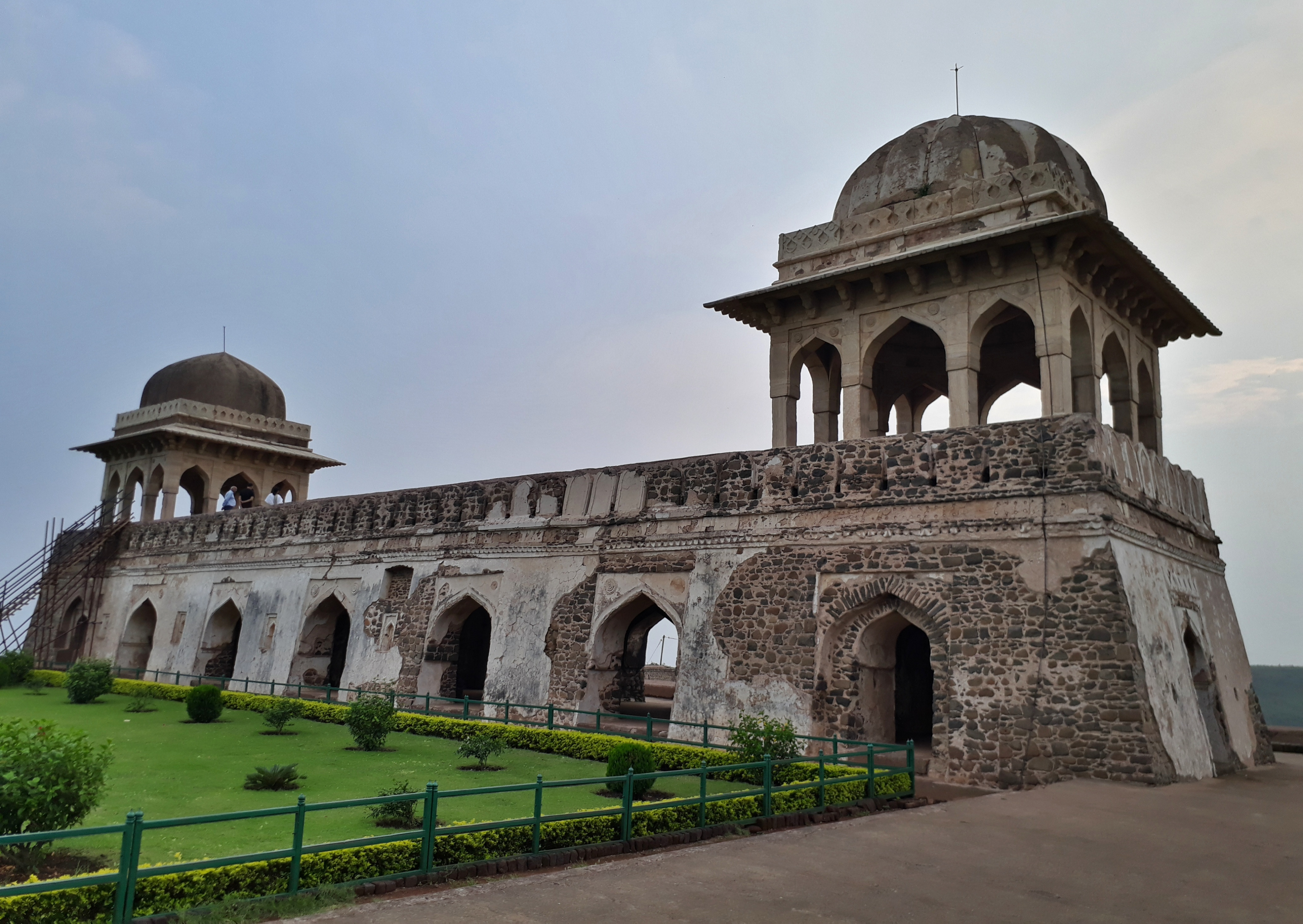
Rupmati Mahal, Mandu

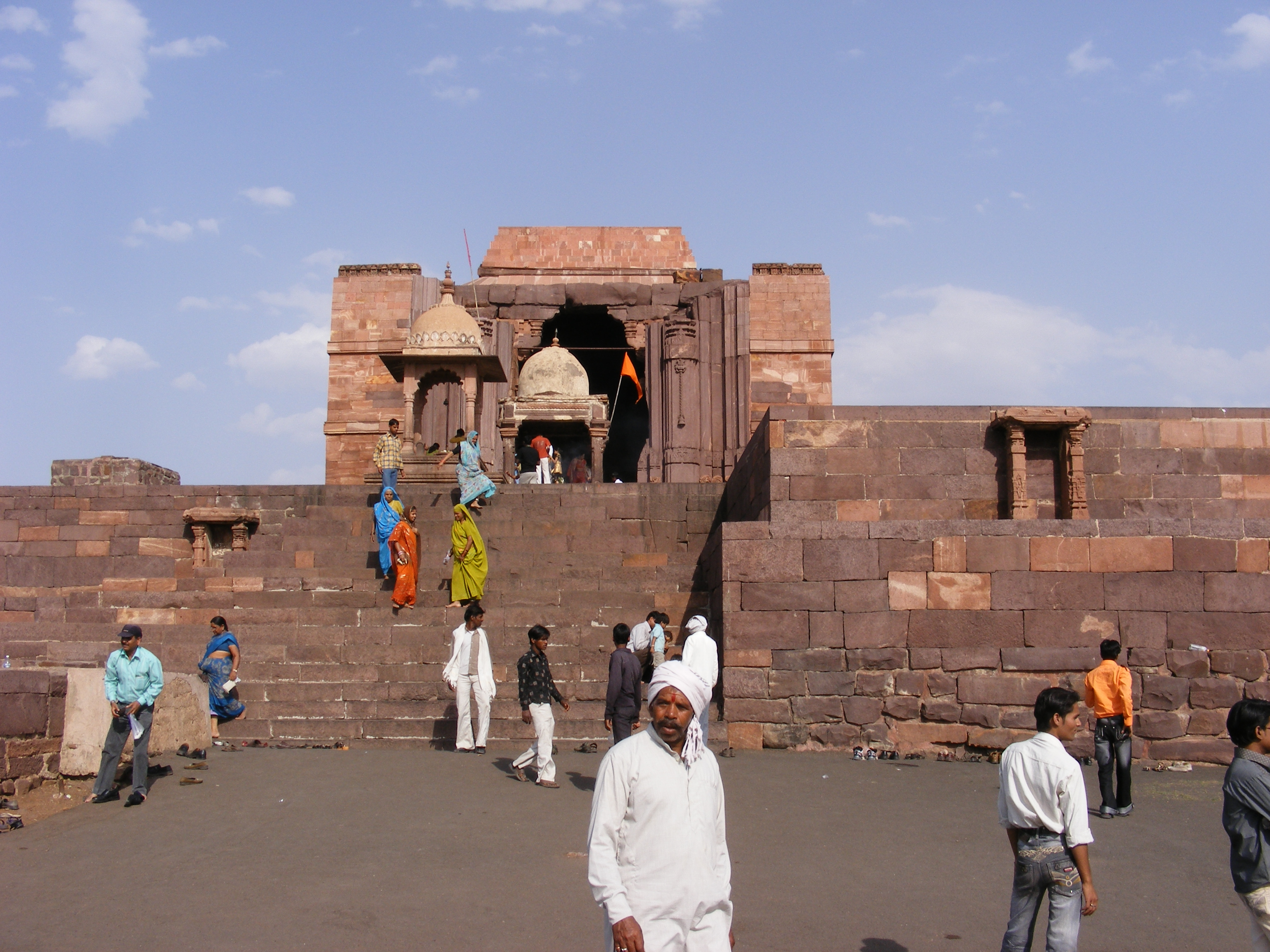
Bhojeshwar Temple

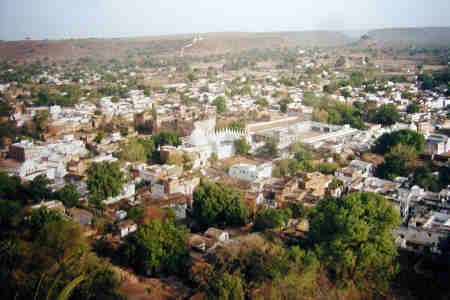
Chanderi

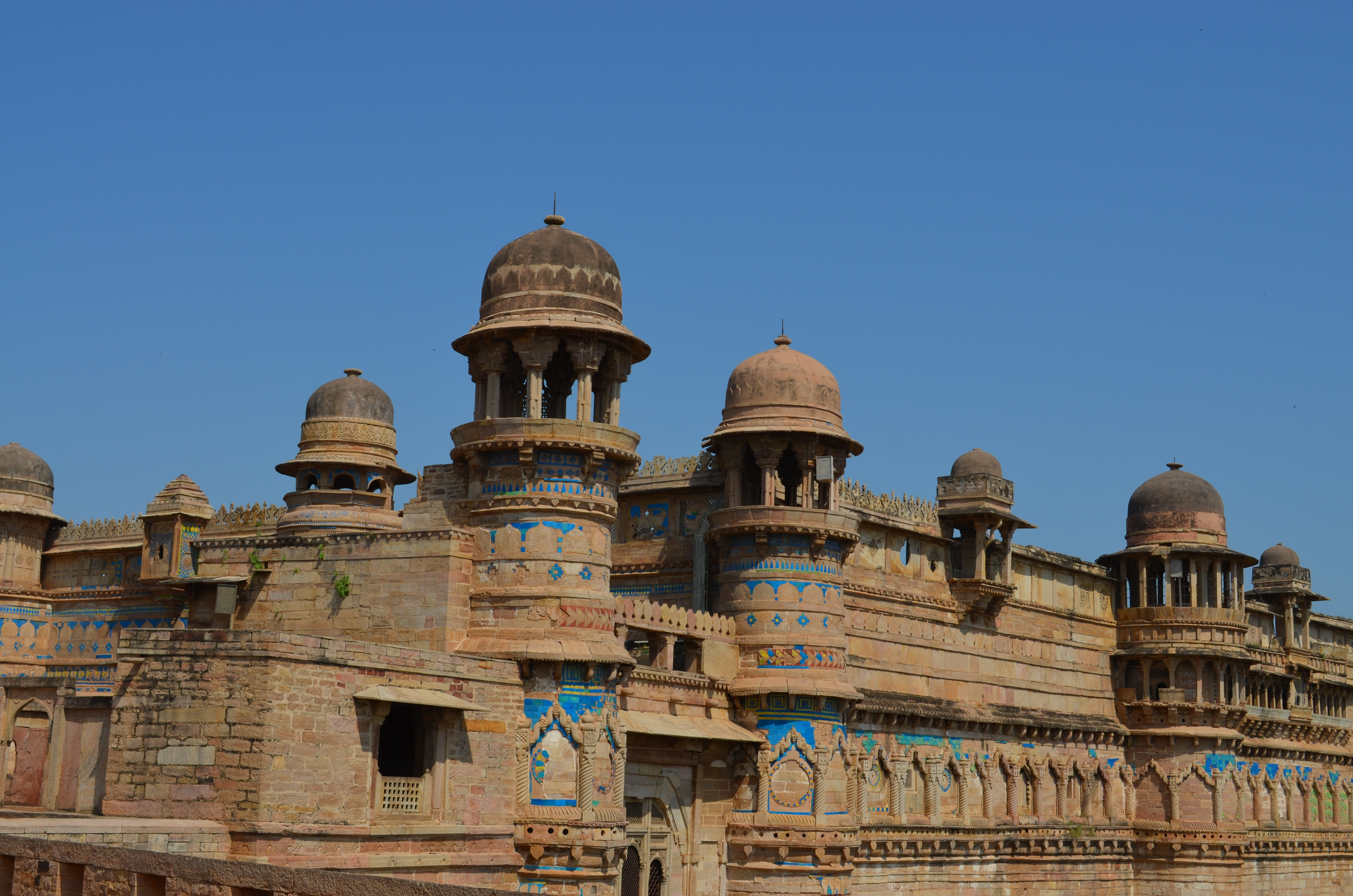
Gwalior Fort

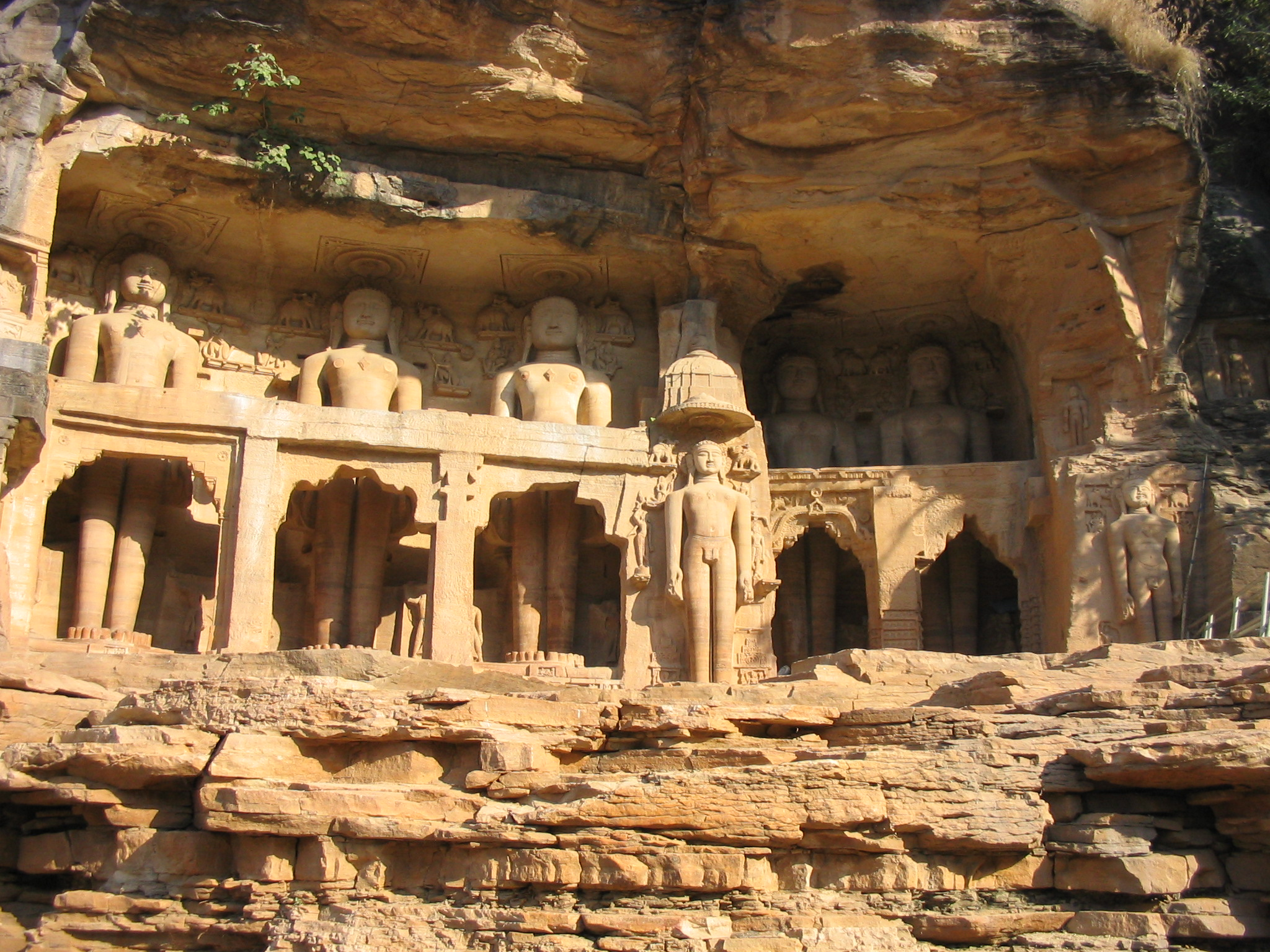
Siddhachal Caves & Gopachal Hill has rock carved Jain sculptures

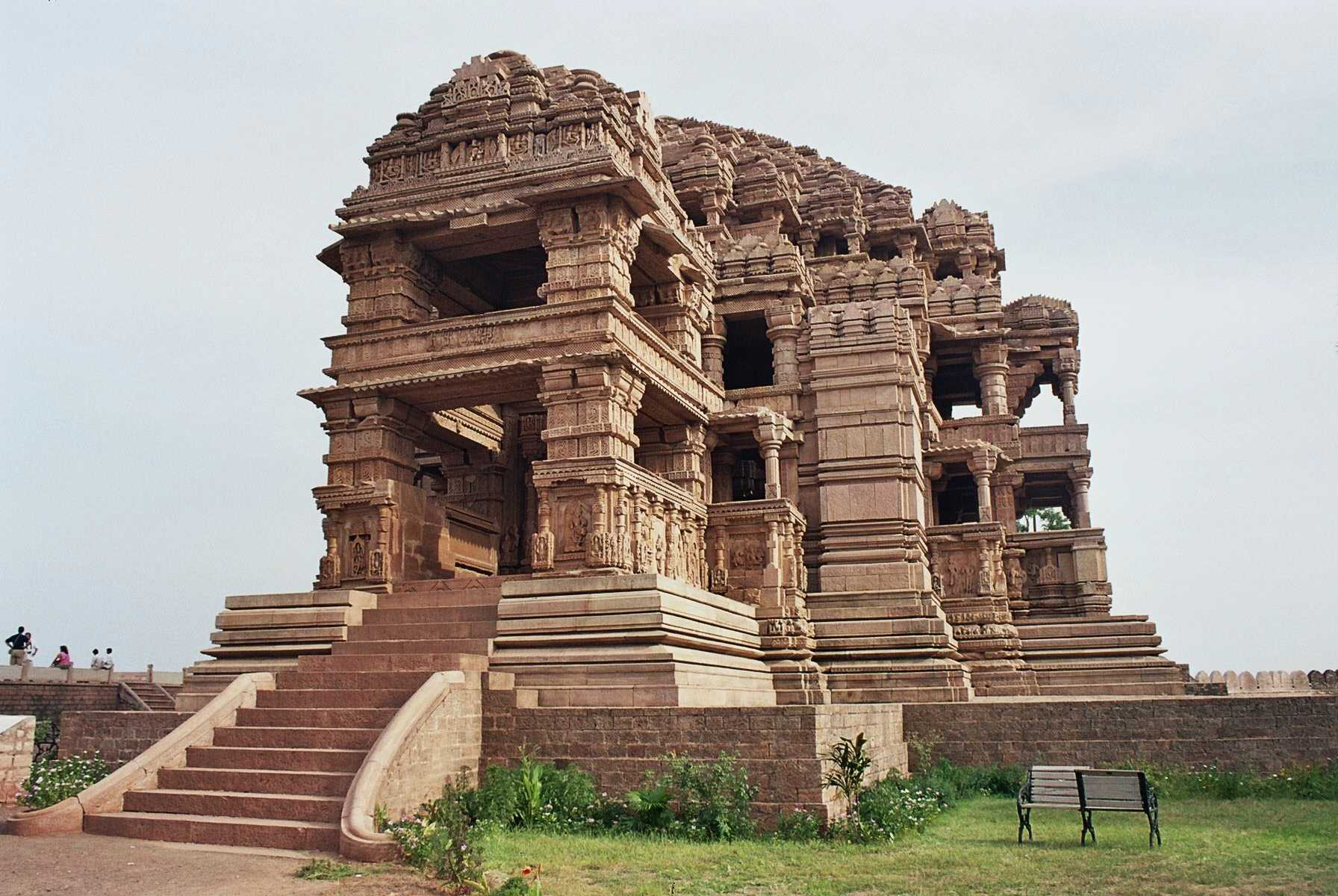
Sasbahu Temple, Gwalior

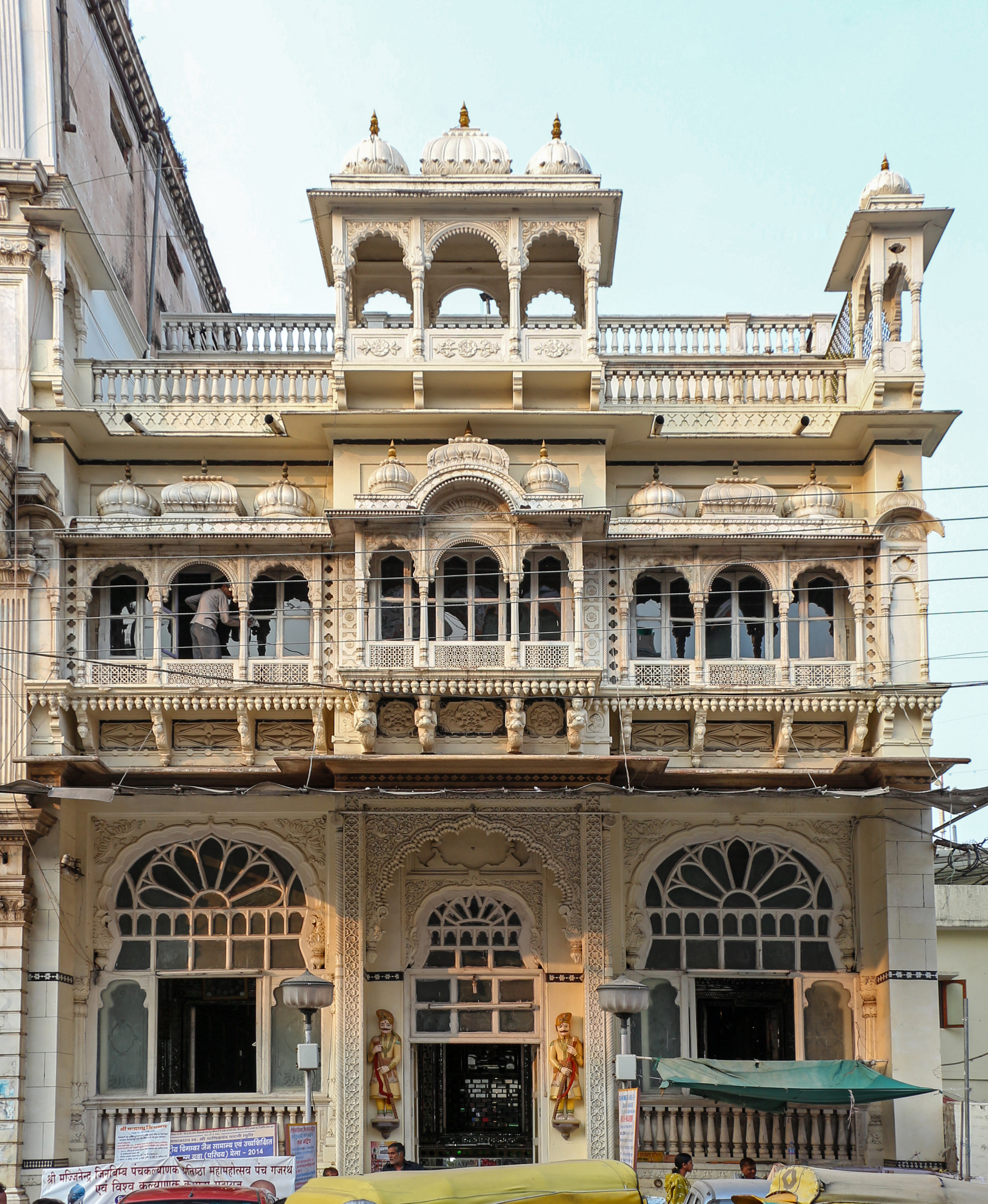
Kanch Mandir, Indore is famous for exquisite artwork on glass panels

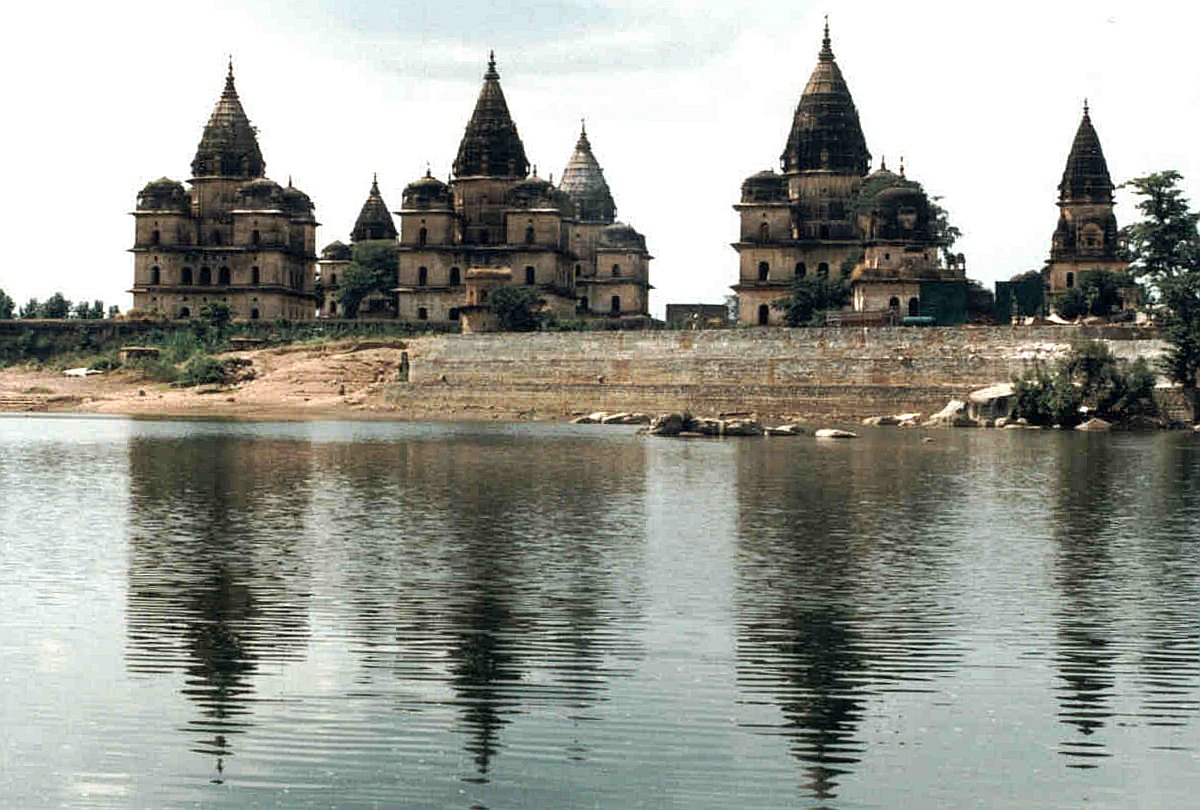
Mausolea on the bank of the Betwa River, Orchha

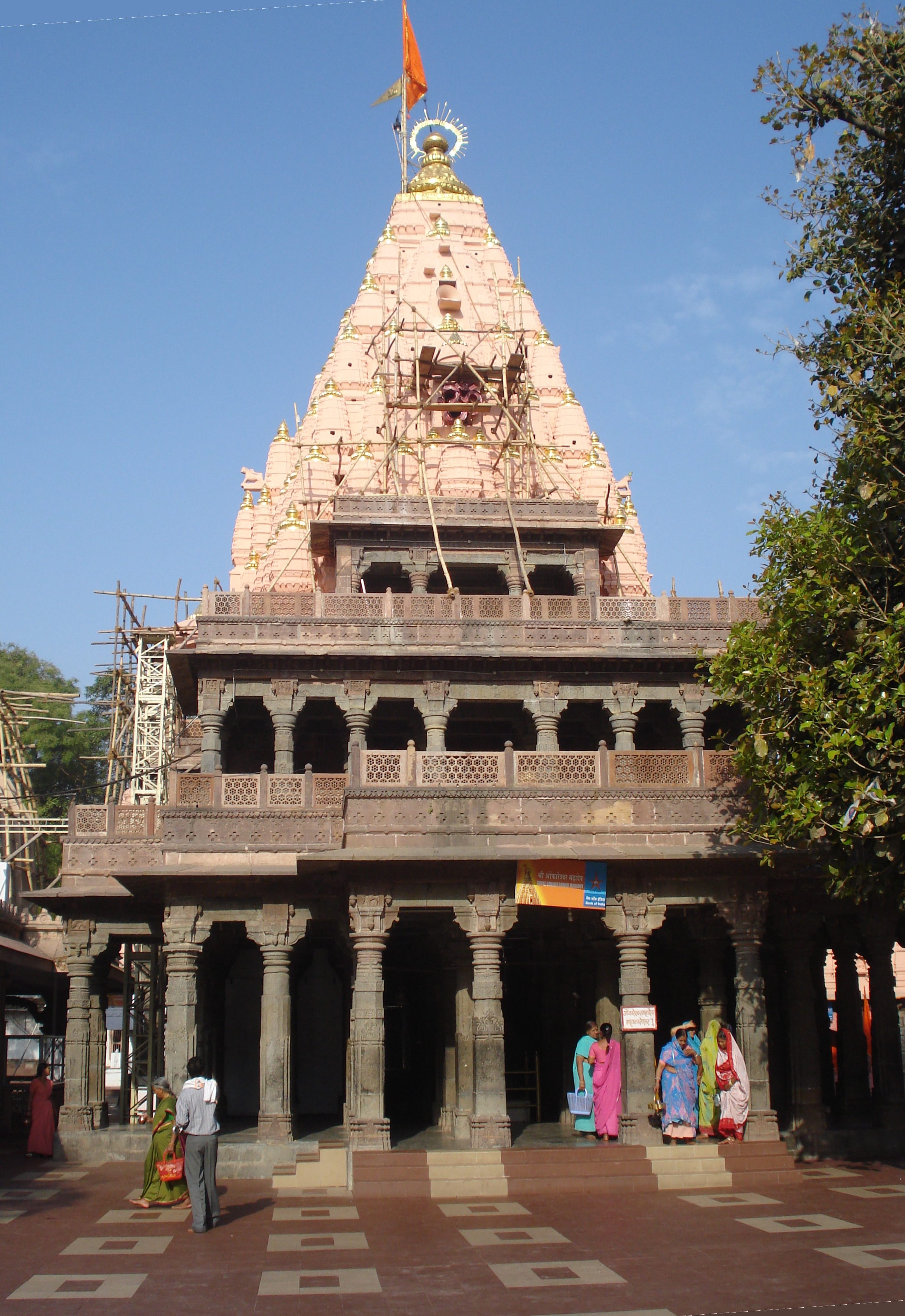
Mahakaleshwar Jyotirlinga, Ujjain

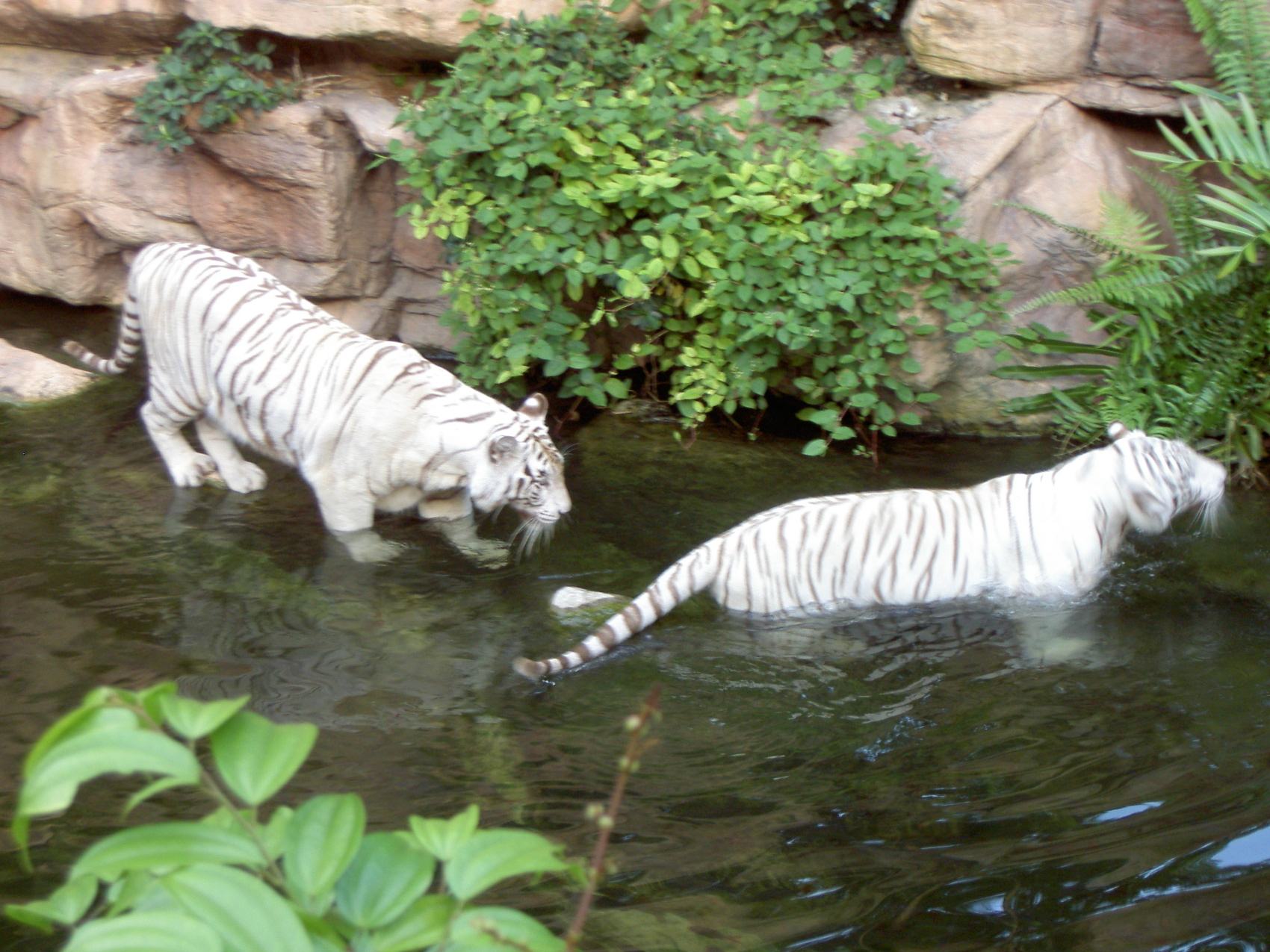
White tigers in the tiger reserve of Panna

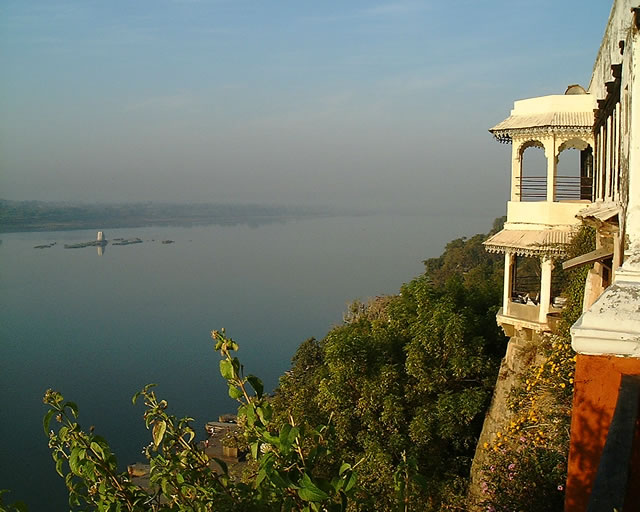
Narmada from the Ahilya Fort, Maheshwar

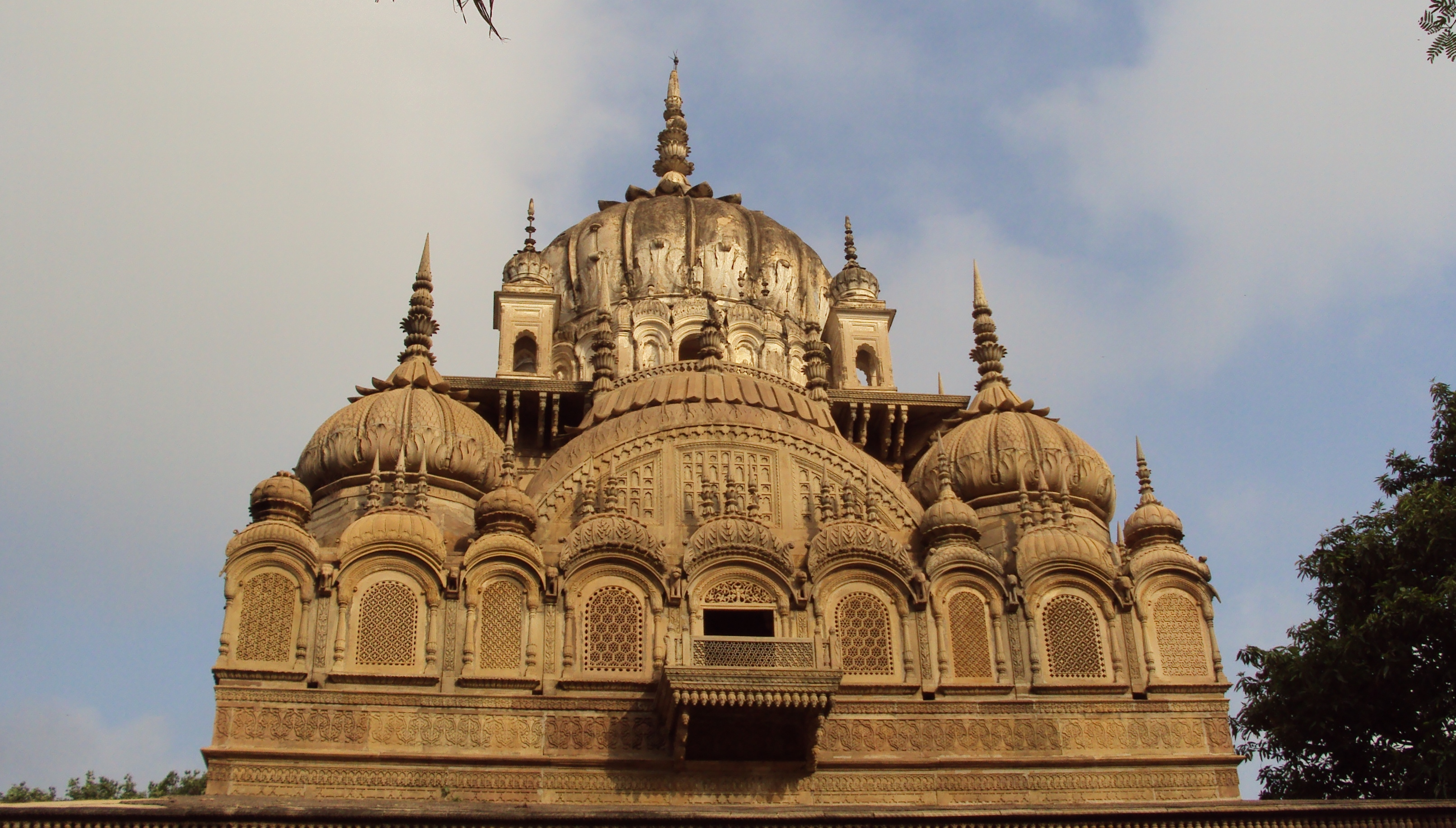
Alampur

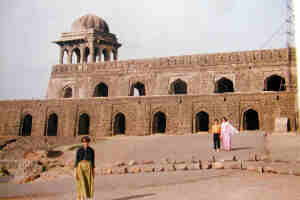
Mandu

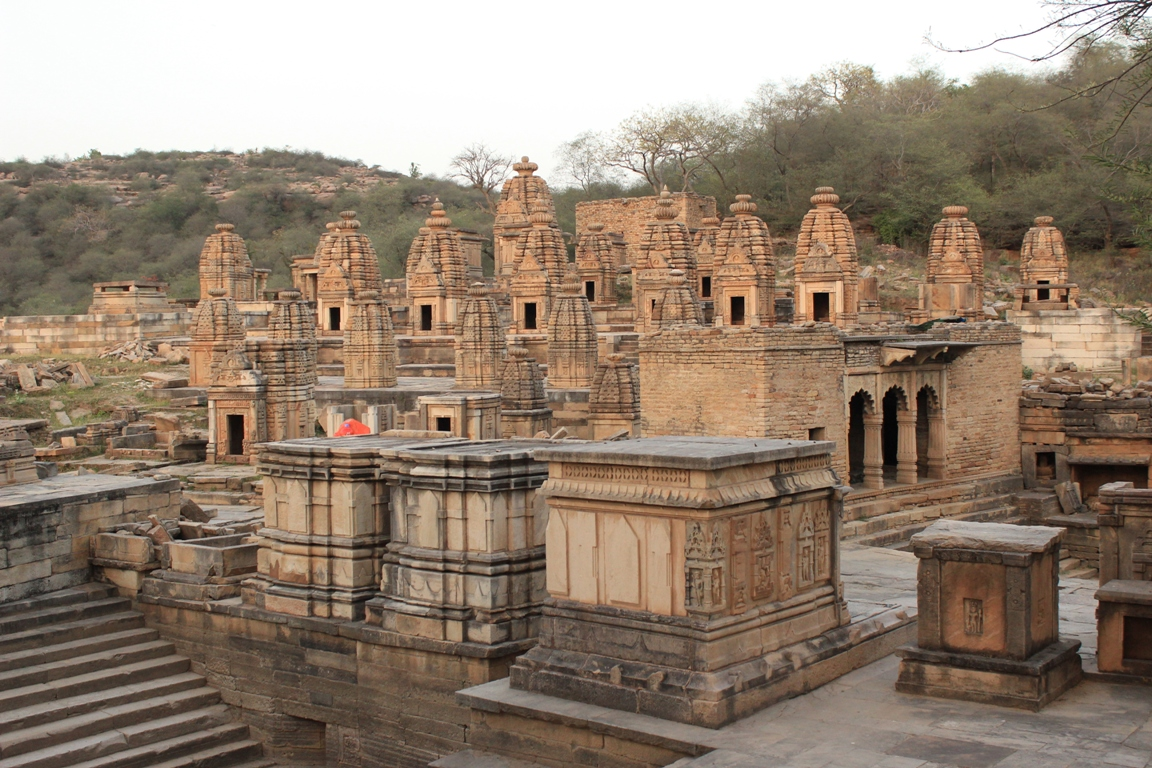
Bateshwar temple complex, Morena

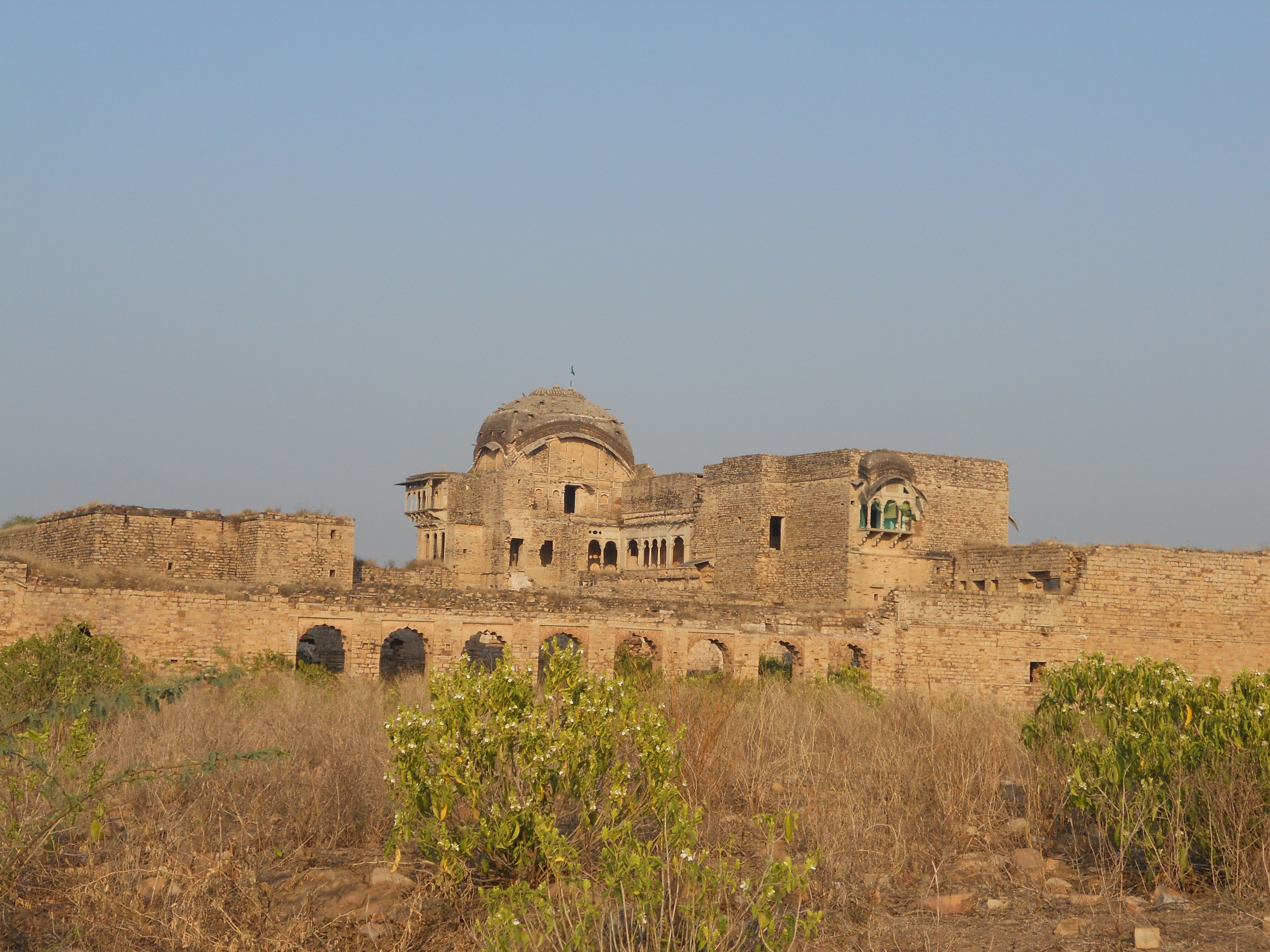
Sabalgarh

== Tourist attractions places ==
1) Kutni Dam

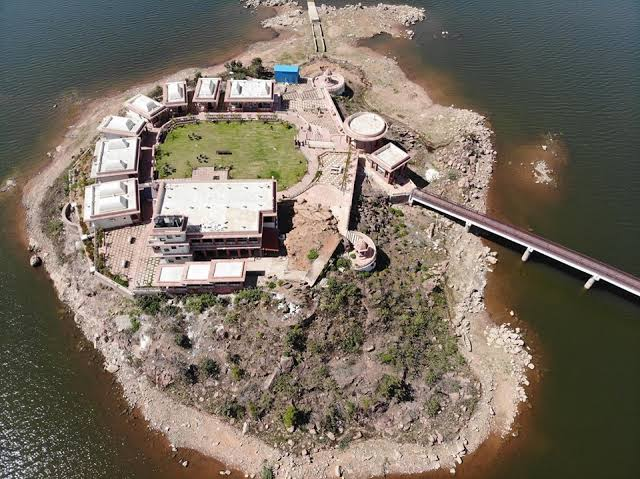

Kutni Dam is a multipurpose river canal project on the Kutni river, situated in Khajwa, Madhya Pradesh, India.It is the largest dam in the Chhatarpur district.The dam across the Kutni river, and it is 7 km from Rajnagar, 12 km from Khajuraho, and 40 km from Chhatarpur District.The dam is famous for its beauty and vastness.

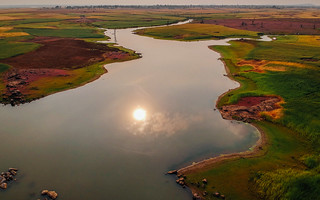

== See also ==
- List of Protected areas of Madhya Pradesh
