= List of protected areas of Madhya Pradesh =

Overview of protected areas in Madhya Pradesh, India

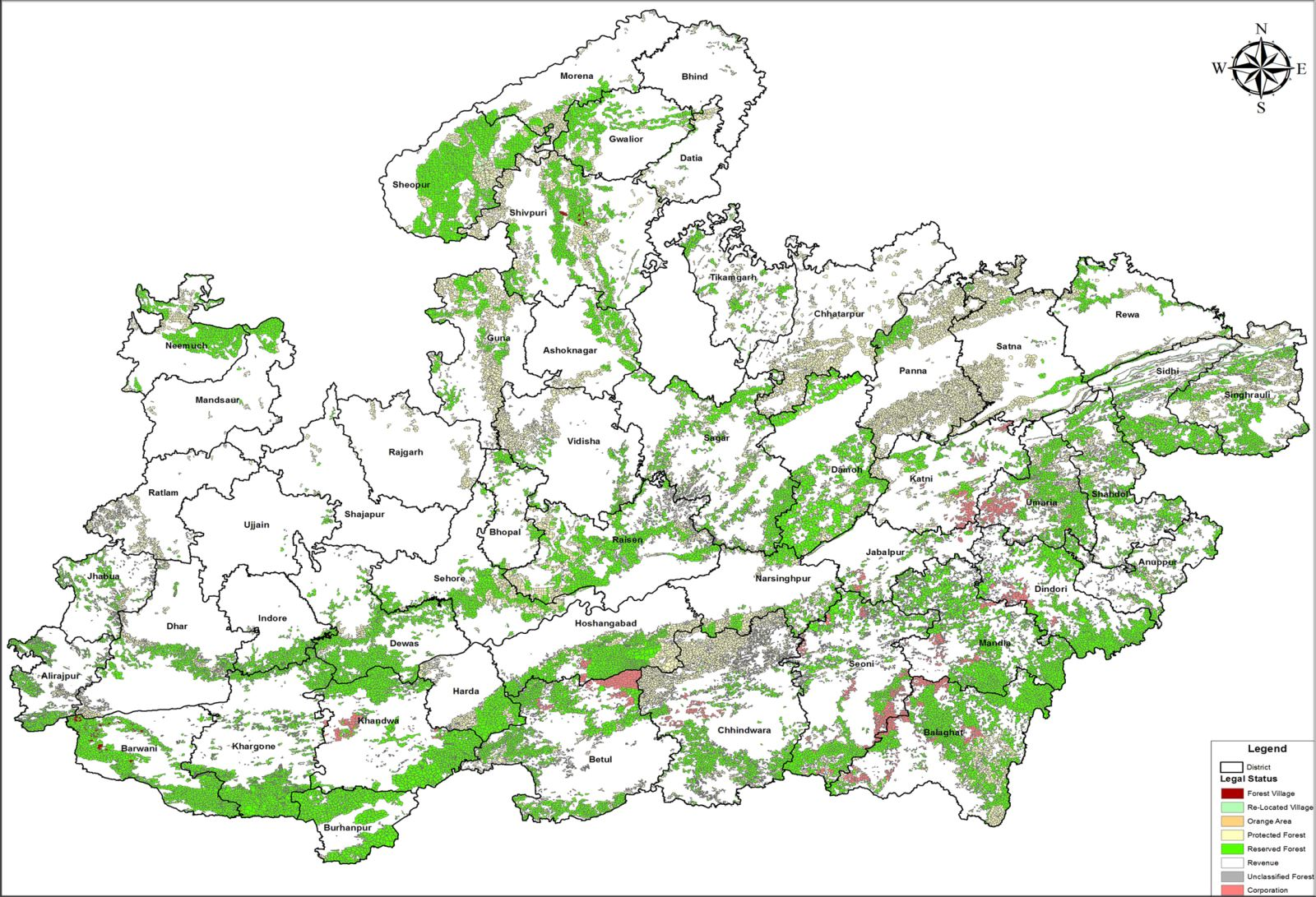
Forest cover in Madhya Pradesh

Protected areas in Madhya Pradesh include 12 National Parks, 22 Wildlife sanctuaries and 3 Biosphere Reserves.

== National Parks ==
Madhya Pradesh is home to 12 of India's National Parks:

| Name | Year of Notification | Area (sq.km.) |
|---|---|---|
| Bandhavgarh National Park | 1968 | 448.842 |
| Ghughua Fossil Park | 1983 | 0.27 |
| Kanha Tiger Reserve | 1955 | 941.793 |
| Kuno National Park | 2018 | 748.761 |
| Madhav National Park | 1959 | 375.23 |
| Panna National Park | 1981 | 542.66 |
| Pench National Park | 1975 | 292.857 |
| Sanjay National Park | 1981 | 464.643 |
| Satpura Tiger Reserve | 1981 | 528.729 |
| Van Vihar National Park | 1979 | 4.452 |
| Dinosaur Fossils National Park | 2011 | 0.89 |
| Omkareshwar National Park | 2004 | 293 |

== Wildlife Sanctuaries ==
Madhya Pradesh is also home to 22 Wildlife sanctuaries:

| Name | Year of Notification | Area (sq.km.) |
|---|---|---|
| Bandhavghar Wildlife Sanctuary | 1978 | 478 |
| Bori Wildlife Sanctuary | 1977 | 485.715 |
| Gandhi Sagar Sanctuary | 1981 | 368.62 |
| Ghatigaon Wildlife Sanctuary | 1981 | 510.64 |
| Karera Wildlife Sanctuary Denotified | 1981 - 2022 | 202.21 |
| Ken Gharial Sanctuary | 1981 | 45.2 |
| Kheoni Wildlife Sanctuary | 1982 | 134.778 |
| Narsinghgarh Wildlife Sanctuary | 1978 | 57.19 |
| National Chambal Wildlife Sanctuary | 1978 | 435 |
| Nauradehi Wildlife Sanctuary merger with Rani durgavati wildlife sanctuary | 1984 | 1197.04 |
| Orchha Wildlife Sanctuary | 1994 | 44.914 |
| Panpatha Wildlife Sanctuary | 1983 | 245.842 |
| Pench Tiger Reserve | 1975 | 118.473 |
| Phen Wildlife Sanctuary | 1983 | 110.704 |
| Ralamandal Wildlife Sanctuary | 1989 | 2.345 |
| Ratapani Wildlife Sanctuary | 1978 | 910.638 |
| Sailana Wildlife Sanctuary | 1983 | 12.965 |
| Sardarpur Wildlife Sanctuary | 1983 | 348.121 |
| Singhori Wildlife Sanctuary | 1976 | 312.036 |
| Son Gharial Wildlife Sanctuary | 1981 | 83.684 |
| Veerangana Durgavati Wildlife Sanctuary | 1997 | 23.973 |
| Bagdara Wildlife Sanctuary | 1978 | 478 |

== Biosphere reserves ==
Biosphere reserves of Madhya Pradesh
| | Year | Name | Location | Type | Key fauna | Area (km^{2}) |
|---|---|---|---|---|---|---|
| 1 | 1999 | Pachmarhi Biosphere Reserve | Parts of Betul District, Narmadapuram District and Chhindwara District | Semi-arid | Giant squirrel, flying squirrel | 4981.72 |
| 2 | 2005 | Achanakmar-Amarkantak Biosphere Reserve | Parts of Annupur and Dindori in Madhya Pradesh; and Bilaspur district in Chhattisgarh | Maikal Hills | Four-horned antelope, Indian wild dog, sarus crane, white-rumped vulture, sacred grove bush frog | 3835 |
| 3 | 2011 | Panna | Parts of Panna district and Chhatarpur district | Tropical and subtropical moist broadleaf forests | Bengal tiger, Chinkara, Nilgai, Sambar deer, and Sloth bear | 2998.98 |

== See also ==
- List of protected areas of Gujarat
