= Madhya Pradesh Agriculture Corporation =

The Madhya Pradesh Agriculture Corporation Limited, (MPACL) provides agriculture machines along with high yield crops, manure and fertilizers.

== Established ==
The company was established in 1991 with its headquarters at Bhopal, the capital of Madhya Pradesh.

== Other regional offices ==
The Second Regional Office is going to develop at Raipur in Chhattisgarh (formerly in Madhya Pradesh State). The Upcoming Building of Raipur is the largest infrastructer building of the corporation.

Offices are planned in Indore, Gwalior, Jabalpur, Bilaspur, Jhabua, Saugor and Ambikapur.

== Employment commission ==
The company at Bhopal employs about 2500 employees, most of them from Bhopal Ruler Region. The Raipur office will have seats for about 1700 employees with addition to Indore with about 3200 employees
