= Conservation in Bhopal =

Bhopal is the capital of Madhya Pradesh state of India.

== Van Vihar National Park ==
The Van Vihar National Park is a national park located in the heart of Bhopal. Although declared a national park in 1983, it is developed and managed as a modern zoological park. It covers an area of about 4.45 km².

== Crusade for Revival of Environment and Wildlife ==
CREW is a society registered in 1997 under the Madhya Pradesh Society Registration Act 1973. CREW's aim is to emerge as Central India's primary centre for policy and enforcement regarding conservation and management of natural resources, wildlife and biodiversity. The Central Indian States of Madhya Pradesh and Chhattisgarh have distinctive characteristics that set this region apart from other areas of the Indian sub-continent. Besides the wealth of natural resources-both forest and mineral—some of the most important archaeological sites, dating back to ten thousand years are located in Madhya Pradesh.

CREW has continued to campaign for the protection of environment, biodiversity, wildlife, forest cover, endangered species and wetlands. CREW uses the visual media and releases b-rolls in digital broadcast quality format on crucial environment related issues to different sections of the media for direct relay and wider dissemination of knowledge and information relating to natural environment and factors threatening environmental balance. As a major initiative to build awareness regarding the importance of wetlands and their conservation, Crew launched an awareness campaign with its documentary "water Birds of Bhopal" shot mainly around Van Vihar National Park, a huge wetland recognized by the Ramsar Convention as an important wetland site in Central India.

Crew has produced the documentary "Endangered Gharial (crocodilian gharial crisis)" to tell how India's special crocodilian Gharial, considered to be one of the most critically endangered of all crocodilian species, is threatened by the destruction of its nesting and basking sites and shrinking prey base. Gharials get caught in fishing nets and are killed by fishermen and turtle hunters.

In collaboration with the Regional Natural History Museum Crew organised a forest, wildlife and birding training camp for college and university teaching staff in the Satpura Tiger Reserve. Crew also organises birding camps for village children.

A number of risks and practices are threatening forests, wildlife, wetlands and the environment. Crew works hard at preventing them. These threats include:

- Disintegration of natural habitats and the remaining forest corridors due to rapid development and human pressure.
- Pollution due to the reckless dumping and disposal of waste and the destruction of the ecosystem and the threat to aquatic and avian species.
- Destruction of natural habitats because of unlawful mining, logging of timber, grazing, man-made forest fires, large-scale commercial exploitation of minor forest produce, use of chemical pesticides, and fishing practices.

=== Vanishing stripes ===
Crew had released two reports Vanishing Stripes (1999) and Vanishing Stripes-II (2000) to issue the firm warning that tiger's survival is threatened by poaching and loss of prey-base. Our forests are shrinking at an alarming pace. Human pressure on forest is immense due to rapidly increasing population. The situation gets aggravated by reckless destruction of green cover by the timber and the mining mafia. Forest land is also getting rapidly encroached. Unhindered grazing, minor forest produce and firewood collection are also activities adding to the crisis.

From 710 tigers in the last tiger estimation before 2006, the tiger population in the central Indian State of Madhya Pradesh came down to 276 in the 2006 tiger population estimation. On an all-India basis, In 2006, the tiger population was estimated at 1,411 (1,165 to 1,657) which was much lower than the earlier official estimates. The latest tiger figures were presented by the Wildlife Institute of India and the Tiger Conservation Authority of the Government of India at a seminar held at the India Habitat Centre, New Delhi on 23 May 2007. The seminar was attended by Prodipto Ghosh, Secretary of Union Ministry of Environment and Forest, chief wildlife wardens, and tiger reserve directors from many states.

The latest tiger population estimate glaringly shows that most of those at the helm of affairs have never bothered to realize the gravity of the problem on the tiger front. They have only offered lip-service and exhibited superficial concern for the basic issues involved. They have remained mainly interested in deriving benefits, both financial and political by allowing populist activities to continue even in the core forest areas. Unless ecological balance is ensured on a long-term basis, no living species, including human beings, may be able to survive.

Forests in India have been shrinking at an alarming pace. Human pressure on forests is immense due to the rapidly increasing population. The situation gets aggravated by the rapidly shrinking green cover. It is important to save the tiger in its natural habitat. The tiger sits at the apex of the biotic pyramid and is an important link in the entire food chain. The tiger will be safe in the wild only when there is a prey-base. This would in turn depend on the survival of th, i.e., grasses, fruit bearing trees, herbs, shrubs and the water bodies along with all other factors linked with the natural habitat. Only then our rivers would be perennial and the underground water would remain charged

The two reports Vanishing Stripes; and Vanishing Stripes-II published by CREW reveal the gravity of the problem and point out how gravely the tiger is threatened in its own habitat.

=== Central Indian Highlands Wildlife Film Festival 2012 ===
Bhopal, capital of Central Indian state of Madhya Pradesh, hosted the Central Indian Highlands Wildlife Film Festival in 2012. The festival's theme was "The Tiger Habitat". The festival was organised by the Crusade for Revival of Environment and Wildlife.
