= Orchha Wildlife Sanctuary =

Wildlife sanctuary in India

- IUCN category IV (habitat/species management area)
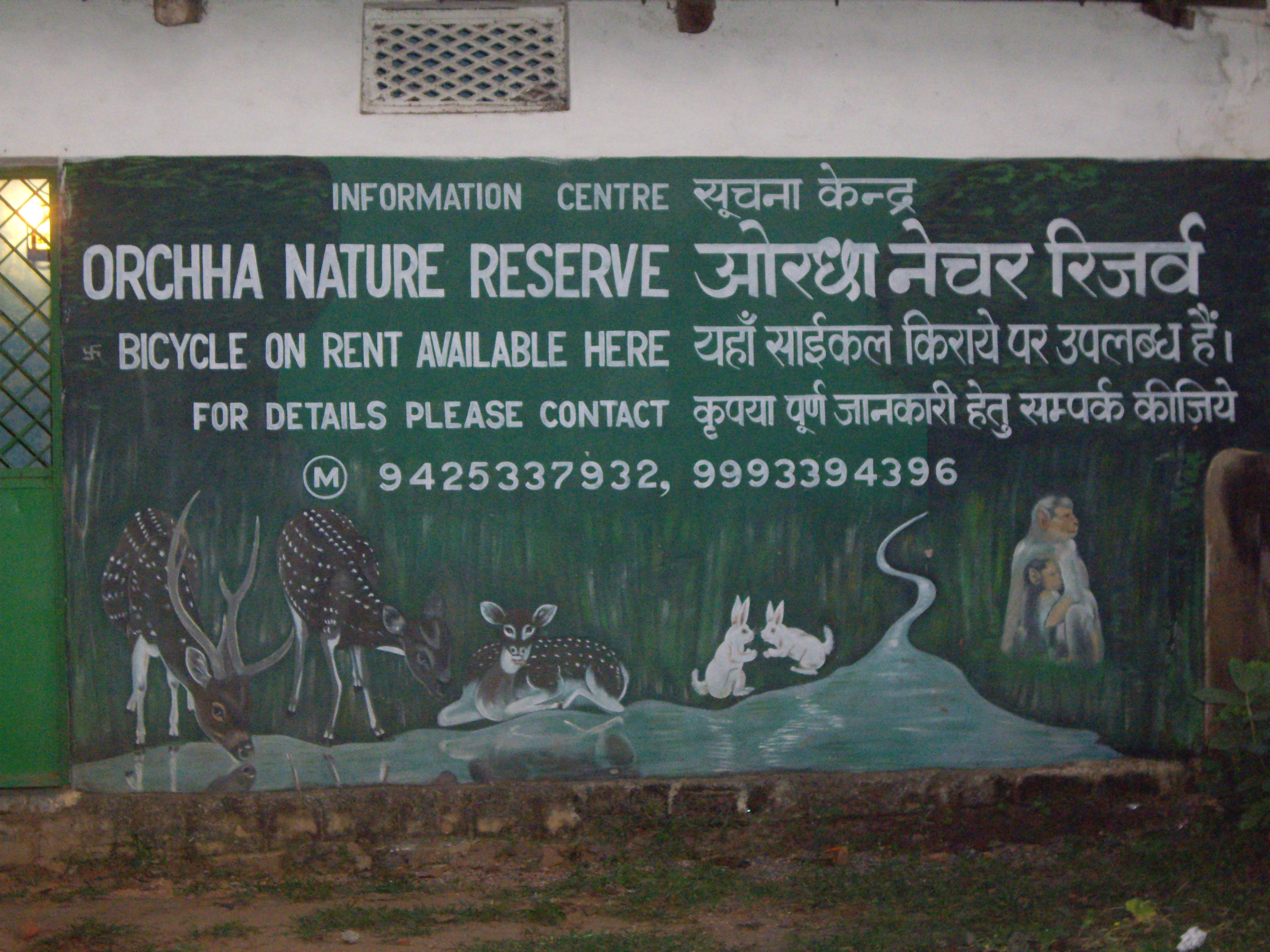
- Orchha Wildlife Sanctuary information center

- Location within Madhya Pradesh Location within India
- Interactive map of Orchha Wildlife Sanctuary
- Location: Niwari district, Madhya Pradesh, India
- Coordinates: 25.35°N 78.64°E
- Area: 46 km^{2} (18 sq mi)
- Established: 1994
- Governing body: Government of Madhya Pradesh

Orchha Wildlife Sanctuary also known Orchha Nature Reserve is a wildlife sanctuary located in Niwari district of the Indian state of Madhya Pradesh. It was established in 1994.

== Overview ==
Orchha Wildlife Sanctuary also known Orchha Nature Reserve is a wildlife sanctuary located near Orchha town in Niwari district of the Indian state of Madhya Pradesh. The sanctuary is spread over an area of 46 km^{2} (18 sq mi) on the banks of the Betwa and Jamni rivers.

== History ==
Orchha Wildlife Sanctuary was established in 1994.

== Flora and fauna ==
The tropical and subtropical dry broadleaf forests and Kardhai forests of Orchha Wildlife Sanctuary are home to 42 angiosperms in 23 families including teak, anogeissus pendula, adina cordifolia, terminalia arjuna etc. Around 200 species of birds, including the Indian vulture, woodpecker, kingfisher, black swan, goose, minivet, peafowl, owls including Collared scops owl, and jungle bush quail can be seen here. Many animals including deer, nilgai, monkeys, wild boar, jackal and sloth bear can also be seen in this wildlife sanctuary. This area was once home to carnivores like tigers and panthers also, but these are no longer here now. 33 genera of fungi have also been isolated from the wildlife sanctuary.

== Threats ==
In 2024 March, the National Green Tribunal received complaints that stone crushers and mining quarries were operating illegally in the Orchha Wildlife Sanctuary, an ecologically sensitive area, posing a threat to the survival of the flora and fauna there. The central bench of the NGT appointed a two-member joint committee to examine this complaint and directed the committee to submit a factual and actionable report within six weeks.

== To reach here ==
The nearest town for Orchha Wildlife Sanctuary is Orchha and nearest railway station is Orchha and Jhansi in Uttar Pradesh. The nearest airport is at Gwalior.
