= Van Vihar National Park =

National park in Madhya Pradesh, India

- IUCN category II (national park)
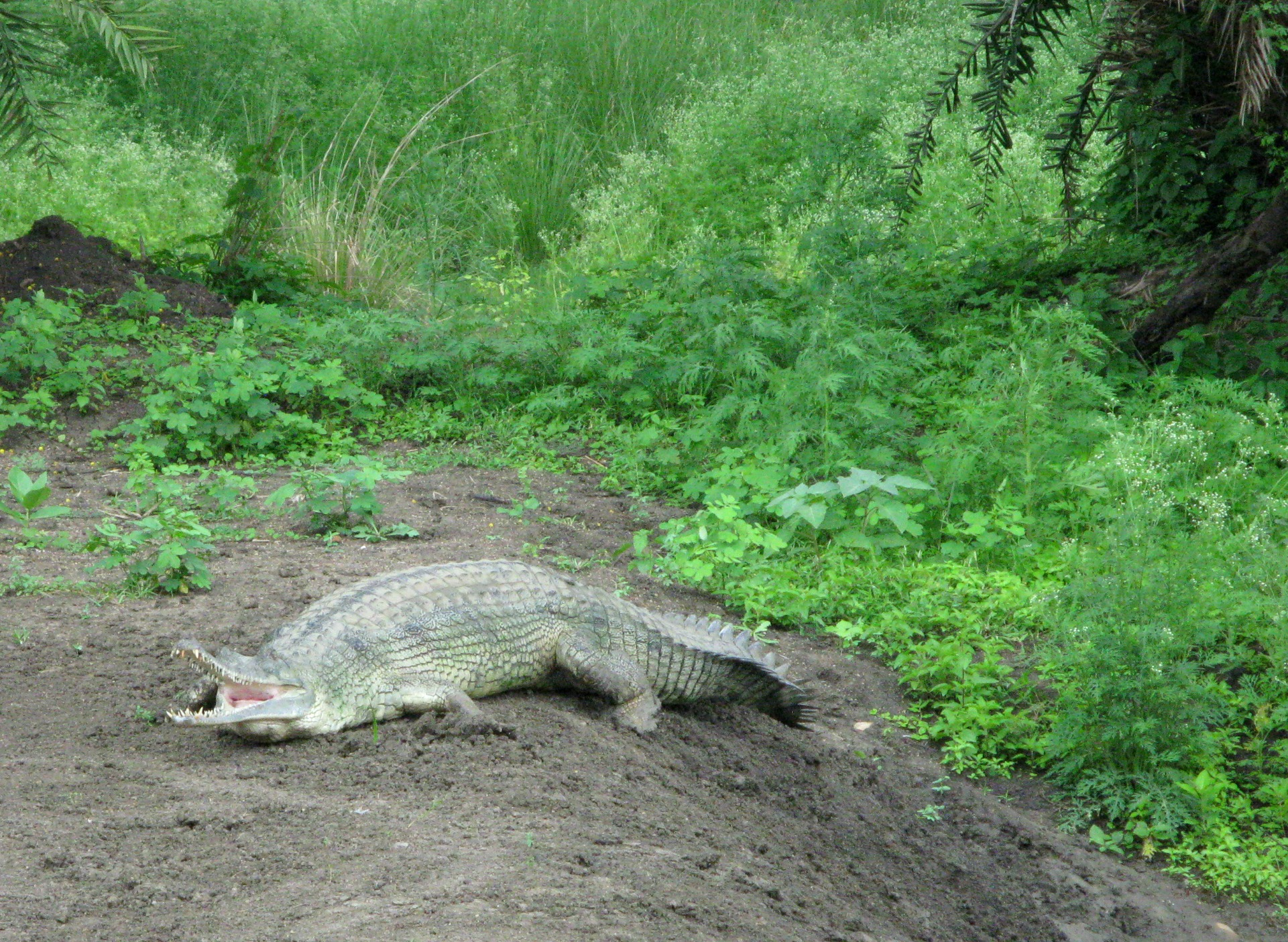
- Gharial at Van Vihar

- Location within Madhya Pradesh
- Interactive map of Van Vihar National Park
- Location: Madhya Pradesh, India
- Nearest city: Bhopal
- Coordinates: 23°13′48″N 77°21′59″E
- Area: 4.48 km^{2} (1.73 sq mi)
- Established: 18 Feb. 1979
- Visitors: 2,50,000
- Governing body: Madhya Pradesh Forest Department

Van Vihar National Park is a national park in Bhopal, the capital city of Madhya Pradesh in central India. Declared a national park in 1979, it covers an area of about 4.45 km^{2}. It has the status of a national park, but is developed and managed as a modern zoological park, following the guidelines of the Central Zoo Authority. Animals are kept in near natural habitats. Most animals are either orphaned and brought from various parts of the state or are exchanged from other zoos. No animal is deliberately captured from the forest. Van Vihar is unique because visitors access it from a road through the park, and trenches, walls, and chain-link fencing protect the animals from poachers while providing natural habitat.

== History ==
In the mid twentieth century a number of illegal stone quarries were operational in the area and, being in a serene and beautiful location on the bank of big lake, many commercial organizations were trying to take hold of this valuable piece of land. Realizing the importance of both in-situ and ex-situ conservation of wild fauna, it was decided to provide this area with a legal umbrella under the Wildlife Protection Act, 1972. A committee of experts was constituted to decide how to make Van Vihar a protected area. In 1983, on the committee's recommendation, the government declared an area of 4.4521 km^{2} (1.7190 sq mi) a national park. Out of the 4.4521 km^{2} (1.7190 sq mi) of land, an area 3.8839 km^{2} (1.4996 sq mi) was government owned land and the rest belonged to the villagers of Prempura, Dharampuri and Amkheda. Compensation of Rs. 23.52 lakhs was paid to villagers to acquire 0.5692 km^{2} (0.2198 sq mi) of private holdings. After the constitution of the National Park, the acquired area was enclosed in with stone walls and chain link fences.

The first Management Plan was drawn up for the years 2000 to 2010.

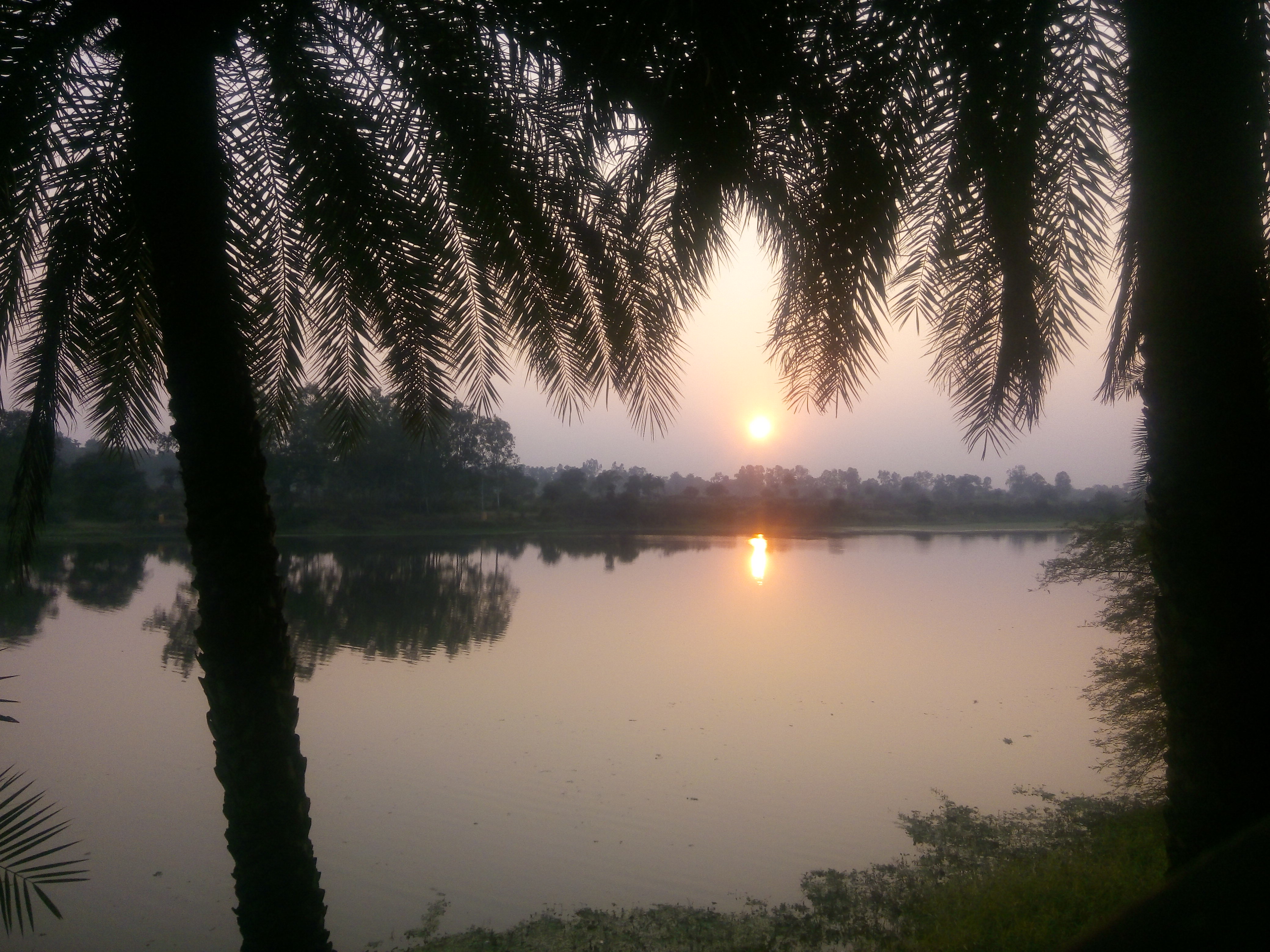
Van Vihar at Sunset

The degraded hillock of Shyamla Hill along with private village land was initiated in 1980 and finally notified as a national park in 1983. Funding from the Central Zoo Authority started in 1993-94 and also granted Van Vihar as a medium sized zoo on the same year. With the dedicated efforts of the park management, the area has now been transformed into an oasis of greenery. The area today serves as the green lung for Bhopal City.

== Wildlife ==
=== Mammals ===
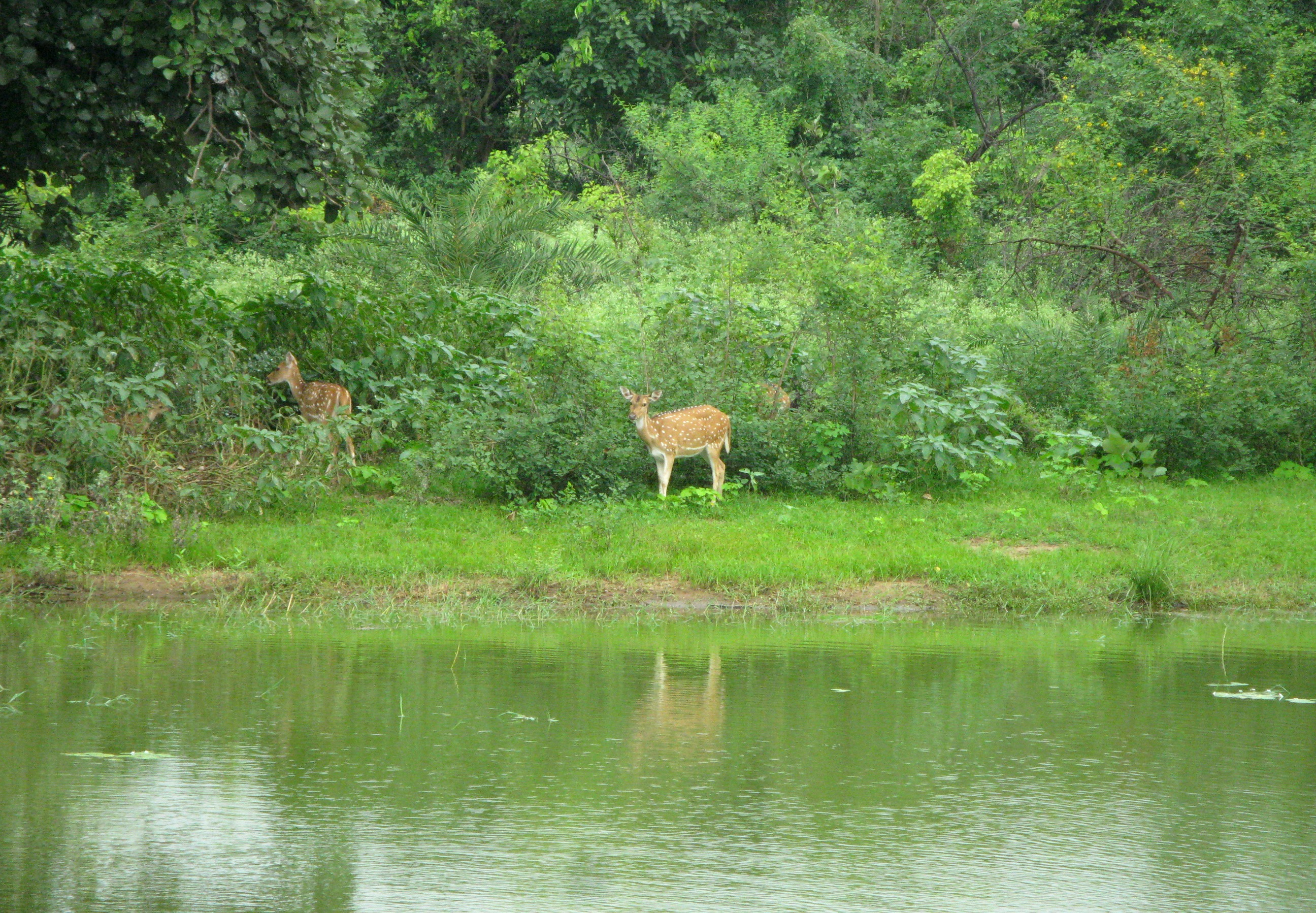
Chital

Chital, sambar, blackbuck, nilgai, four-horned antelope, wild boar, porcupine, hare, Rhesus macaque, common langur are ranging freely. Normally the grass and other plant species growing in Van Vihar are sufficient for these herbivores. However, in summer when the grass is scarce, green fodder produced in the fodder farm and wheat husk procured from the market is provided as a supplement. In its ponds, Indian star tortoise, turtles, and a variety of fish occur. Van Vihar also preserves animals belonging to endangered species.

=== Birds ===
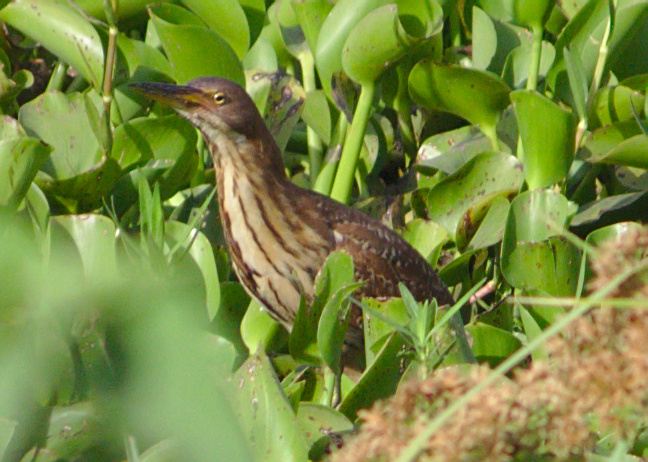
Cinnamon bittern

The wilderness of park offers an ideal habitat for a number of avian fauna. Till now about two hundred species of birds have been listed in different parts of Van Vihar. Large number of birds frequent this park, especially during winter the migratory waterfowl alight in great numbers in the adjoining extensive wetland of big lake. In the 2010s, the park developed a vulture breeding centre, which initially focused on restoring populations of white-rumped vulture (Gyps bengalensis), and long billed vultures (G. indicus).

== Administration ==
The park is maintained by the Forest Department of Madhya Pradesh. The park administration is headed by a director of the rank of chief conservator of forests and assisted by one assistant director, 3 range officers, 3 deputy-rangers, 4 foresters and 24 forest guards. In addition to these, persons are engaged on daily wage basis, to meet the day-to-day requirement of the animal care and management. Van Vihar administration is promoting cycling in the park; bicycles can be rented inside park gates at either end of the park. Van Vihar is closed on Fridays.

== See also ==
- Conservation in Bhopal
- Wildlife of India
- Van Vihar Wildlife Sanctuary, a wildlife sanctuary in Rajasthan
