= List of Padma Shri award recipients in public affairs =

Recipients of a civilian award in India

This is a list of recipients of the Padma Shri award, the fourth-highest civilian award of the Republic of India, in the field of civil service. As of 2025, a total of 70 individuals have been awarded the Padma Shri for their contributions in the field of public affairs.

== 1950–1959 ==
Year	Name	State	Field
1954	Sarvapalli Radhakrishnan	Tamil Nadu	Public affairs
1954	Chakravarti Rajagopalachari	Tamil Nadu	Public affairs
1954	Zakir Husain	Telangana	Public affairs
1954	Bal Gangadhar Kher	Maharashtra	Public affairs
1954	HH Maharaja Sri Sri Sri Sri Sri Jigme Dorji Wangchuk	Bhutan	Public affairs
1954	Vengalil Krishnan Krishna Menon	Kerala	Public affairs
1954	Lt. Col Maharaj Kumar Palden Thondup Namgyal	Sikkim	Public affairs
1954	Vaikunth Lallubhai Mehta	Gujarat	Public affairs
1954	Kum. Amalaprava Das	Assam	Public affairs
1954	Machani Somappa	Andhra Pradesh	Public affairs
1954	Achamma Mathai	Maharashtra	Public affairs
1954	Asha Devi Aryanayakam	Maharashtra	Public affairs
1954	Mrinmayi Ray	Andhra Pradesh	Public affairs
1954	Perin Captian	Maharashtra	Public affairs
1955	Jawaharlal Nehru	Uttar Pradesh	Public affairs
1956	Chandulal Madhavlal Trivedi	Madhya Pradesh	Public affairs
1956	Saiyid Fazl Ali	Bihar	Public affairs
1956	Nawab Zain Yar Jung	Telangana	Public affairs
1956	Pushpavati Janardanrai Mehta	Maharashtra	Public affairs
1957	Govind Ballabh Pant	Uttar Pradesh	Public affairs
1957	Motilal Chimanlal Setalvad	Maharashtra	Public affairs
1957	Sri Prakasa	Andhra Pradesh	Public affairs
1957	Radha Kumud Mookerji	West Bengal	Public affairs
1957	Lakshmi N Menon	Kerala	Public affairs
1957	Major Ralengnao Khathing	Manipur	Public affairs
1958	Moturi Satyanarayana	Tamil Nadu	Public affairs
1959	Radha Binode Pal	West Bengal	Public affairs
1959	Prataprai Girdharilal Mehta	Maharashtra	Public affairs

== 1960-1969 ==
Year	Name	State	Field
1960	Narayana Raghavan Pillai	Tamil Nadu	Public affairs
1960	Nilakantha Das	Odisha	Public affairs
1960	Ayyadevara Kaleswara Rao	Andhra Pradesh	Public affairs
1960	Rustom Merwanji Alpaiwala	Maharashtra	Public affairs
1961	Bidhan Chandra Roy	West Bengal	Public affairs
1961	Purushottam Das Tandon	Uttar Pradesh	Public affairs
1961	Vindhyeshwari Prasad Varma	Bihar	Public affairs
1962	Rajendra Prasad	Bihar	Public affairs
1962	Padmaja Naidu	Telangana	Public affairs
1962	Moturi Satyanarayana	Tamil Nadu	Public affairs
1962	Sudhindra Nath Mukerjee	West Bengal	Public affairs
1962	Mithan J. Lam	Maharashtra	Public affairs
1963	Zakir Husain	Telangana	Public affairs
1963	Hari Vinayak Pataskar	Maharashtra	Public affairs
1963	R. G. Saraiya	Maharashtra	Public affairs
1964	Pandit Kunji Lal Dubey	Madhya Pradesh	Public affairs
1964	Nur-ud-din Ahmed	Delhi	Public affairs
1965	Mehdi Nawaz Jung	Telangana	Public affairs
1965	Capt. H H Raja Shrimant Chintamanrao Dhundirao Alias Appasaheb Patwardhan	Maharashtra	Public affairs
1965	Mir Akbar Ali Khan	Andhra Pradesh	Public affairs
1965	Krishnaswami Ayyar Balasubramania Ayyar	Tamil Nadu	Public affairs
1966	Lal Bahadur Shastri (posthumous)	Uttar Pradesh	Public affairs
1966	Kizhkke Potte Kesava Menon	Kerala	Public affairs
1966	Tiruvarur Swaminathier Ramaswami Aiyar	Tamil Nadu	Public affairs
1967	Chandra Kisan Daphtary	Maharashtra	Public affairs
1967	Kaikhushru Ruttonji Pestonji Shroff	Maharashtra	Public affairs
1967	Kashi Prasad Pande	Madhya Pradesh	Public affairs
1967	Lal Chand Verman	Delhi	Public affairs
1968	Madhav Shrihari Aney	Madhya Pradesh	Public affairs
1968	Kuthur Vaidyanatha Kalyana Sundaram	Delhi	Public affairs
1968	Mansukhlal Atmaram Master	Maharashtra	Public affairs

== 1970–1979 ==
Year	Name	State	Field
1970	Anthony Lancelot Dias	Maharashtra	Public affairs
1970	Bhagwant Rao Annabhau Mandloi	Madhya Pradesh	Public affairs
1970	Hans Raj Gupta	Haryana	Public affairs
1971	Indira Gandhi	Uttar Pradesh	Public affairs
1971	Bimal Prasad Chaliha	Assam	Public affairs
1971	Bhai Mohan Singh	Delhi	Public affairs
1971	Ram Lal Mehta	Delhi	Public affairs
1972	Aditya Nath Jha (posthumous)	Uttar Pradesh	Public affairs
1972	Jivraj Narain Mehta	Maharashtra	Public affairs
1972	Prahlad Balacharya Gajendragadkar	Maharashtra	Public affairs
1972	Ghulam Mohd. Sadiq (posthumous)	Jammu and Kashmir	Public affairs
1972	Gopaliah Subbukrishna Melkote	Odisha	Public affairs
1973	Nagendra Singh	Rajasthan	Public affairs
1973	Ijwant Singh	Delhi	Public affairs
1974	Niren De	West Bengal	Public affairs
1975	Varahagiri Venkata Giri	Odisha	Public affairs
1975	Chintaman Dwarkanath Deshmukh	Andhra Pradesh	Public affairs
1975	Dr. (Smt.) Durgabai Deshmukh	Maharashtra	Public affairs
1976	Kumaraswamy Kamraj (posthumous)	Tamil Nadu	Public affairs
1977	Ajudhia Nath Khosla	Delhi	Public affairs
1977	Ajoy Kumar Mukherjee	West Bengal	Public affairs
1977	Ali Yavar Jung Bahadur (posthumous)	Telangana	Public affairs
1977	Chandreshwar Prasad Narayan Singh	Delhi	Public affairs
1977	Baba Prithvi Singh Azad	Chandigarh	Public affairs
1977	Telo De Mascarenhas	Germany	Public affairs

== 1980–1989 ==
Year	Name	State	Field
1985	Justice Durga Das Basu	West Bengal	Public affairs
1985	Syed (Justice) Sadat Abdul Masud	West Bengal	Public affairs
1986	Jean Riboud (posthumous)	France	Public affairs
1986	Martand Singh	Delhi	Public affairs
1988	Manidur Gopalan Ramachandran (posthumous)	Tamil Nadu	Public affairs
1988	Justice Mirza Hameedullah Beg	Delhi	Public affairs
1988	Kushok Bakula	Delhi	Public affairs
1988	Renuka Ray	West Bengal	Public affairs
1988	Valmiki Choudhary	Delhi	Public affairs
1989	Umashankar Dikshit	Uttar Pradesh	Public affairs
1989	Lord Fenner Brockway (posthumous)	United Kingdom	Public affairs
1989	Lakshman Singh	Maharashtra	Public affairs
1989	Yoshio Sakurauchi	Japan	Public affairs

== 1990–1999 ==
Year	Name	State	Field
1990	Bhimrao Ramji Ambedkar (posthumous)	Maharashtra	Public affairs
1990	Nelson Rolihlahla Mandela	South Africa	Public affairs
1990	Triloki Nath Chaturvedi	Delhi	Public affairs
1990	Julius Silverman	United Kingdom	Public affairs
1990	Ram Narain Malhotra	Maharashtra	Public affairs
1991	Sardar Vallabhbhai Patel (posthumous)	Gujarat	Public affairs
1991	Morarji Ranchhodji Desai	Gujarat	Public affairs
1991	Rajiv Gandhi (posthumous)	Delhi	Public affairs
1991	Hirendra Nath Mukherjee	West Bengal	Public affairs
1991	Nayakulu Gogineni Ranga	Andhra Pradesh	Public affairs
1991	Gulzari Lal Nanda	Gujarat	Public affairs
1991	Fali Sam Nariman	Delhi	Public affairs
1991	Jeevan Singh Umranangal	Punjab	Public affairs
1991	Manubhai Rajaram Panoholi	Gujarat	Public affairs
1991	Babulal Chhogalal Pataudi	Madhya Pradesh	Public affairs
1991	Hari Govindrao alias Bhausaheb Vartak	Maharashtra	Public affairs
1992	Maulana Abul Kalam Azad (posthumous)	West Bengal	Public affairs
1992	Sardar Swaran Singh	Punjab	Public affairs
1992	Atal Bihari Vajpayee	Delhi	Public affairs
1992	Ravi Narayan Reddy (posthumous)	Telangana	Public affairs
1992	Aruna Asaf Ali	Delhi	Public affairs
1992	Bijoy Chandra Bhagavati	Assam	Public affairs
1992	Vavilala Gopalakrishnayya	Andhra Pradesh	Public affairs
1992	Homijehangir Hormusji Taleyarkhan	Maharashtra	Public affairs
1992	Maadari Bhagya Gautam	Telangana	Public affairs
1992	Vaman Balkrishna Naique Prataprao Sardesai	Goa	Public affairs
1997	Gulzari Lal Nanda (posthumous)	Gujarat	Public affairs
1997	Aruna Asaf Ali (posthumous)	Delhi	Public affairs
1998	Chidambaram Subramaniam	Tamil Nadu	Public affairs
1998	(Smt.) Lakshmi Sahgal	Uttar Pradesh	Public affairs
1998	Nani Ardeshir Palkhivala	Maharashtra	Public affairs
1998	Walter Sisulu	South Africa	Public affairs
1998	Col. Gurbakhsh Singh Dhillon	Madhya Pradesh	Public affairs
1998	Laxmi Mall Singhvi	Delhi	Public affairs
1998	Justice (Shri) Vithal Mahadev Tarkunde	Uttar Pradesh	Public affairs
1998	Satyapal Dang	Punjab	Public affairs
1998	Shri Jayaprakash Narayan (posthumous)	Bihar	Public affairs
1999	Shri Gopinath Bordoloi (posthumous)	Assam	Public affairs
1999	Justice Hans Raj Khanna (Retd.)	Delhi	Public affairs
1999	Justice Vaidynathapuram Rama Ayyar Krishna Iyer (Retd.)	Kerala	Public affairs
1999	Braj Kumar Nehru	Himachal Pradesh	Public affairs
1999	Jag Parvesh Chandra	Delhi	Public affairs

== 2000–2009 ==
Year	Name	State	Field
2000	Sikander Bakht	Delhi	Public affairs
2000	Maulana Wahiduddin Khan	Delhi	Public affairs
2000	Enuga Sreenivasulu Reddy	United States	Public affairs
2000	Satya Narayan Gourisaria	United Kingdom	Public affairs
2001	Benjamin Arthur Gilman	United States	Public affairs
2001	Hosei Norota	Japan	Public affairs
2001	Ashok Haribhai Desai	Delhi	Public affairs
2001	Swadesh Chatterjee	United States	Public affairs
2001	Mohan Ranade	Maharashtra	Public affairs
2002	Soli Jehangir Sorabjee	Delhi	Public affairs
2002	Congressman Frank Pallone	United States	Public affairs
2002	Congressman Gary Ackerman	United States	Public affairs
2002	Sushantha Kumar Bhattacharya	United Kingdom	Public affairs
2002	Kottayan Katankot Venugopal	Delhi	Public affairs
2002	Satish Chandra Rai	Uttar Pradesh	Public affairs
2002	Phillips Talbot	United States	Public affairs
2002	Taro Nakayama	Japan	Public affairs
2002	Viresh Pratap Chaudhry	Delhi	Public affairs
2003	Kazi Lhendup Dorji Kangsarpa	West Bengal	Public affairs
2003	Herbert Paul Fischer	Germany	Public affairs
2003	Parasaran Kesava Iyengar	Delhi	Public affairs
2003	Francis Dore	France	Public affairs
2003	Neelakanta Ramakrishna Madhava Menon	West Bengal	Public affairs
2004	Justice (Retd) Manepalli Narayana Rao Venkatachaliah	Karnataka	Public affairs
2004	Justice (Retd.) Shri Chandrashekhar Shankar Dharmadhikari	Maharashtra	Public affairs
2004	Yoshiro Mori	Japan	Public affairs
2004	Flora Isabel MacDonald	Canada	Public affairs
2005	Karan Singh	Delhi	Public affairs
2005	Milon Kumar Banerji	Delhi	Public affairs
2005	Syed Mir Qasim (posthumous)	Delhi	Public affairs
2005	Indira Jaising	Delhi	Public affairs
2006	Justice Visheshwar Nath Khare	Uttar Pradesh	Public affairs
2006	Hira Lall Sibal	Chandigarh	Public affairs
2006	Pavani Parmeswara Rao	Uttar Pradesh	Public affairs
2006	Shashi Bhushan	Delhi	Public affairs
2006	Sheikh Abdul Rahman Al Mahmoud	Qatar	Public affairs
2007	Raja Jesudoss Chelliah	Tamil Nadu	Public affairs
2007	Justice (Shri) Prafulla Chandra Bhagwati	Delhi	Public affairs
2007	Fali Sam Nariman	Delhi	Public affairs
2007	Justice (Shri) K.T. Thomas	Kerala	Public affairs
2007	Ela Gandhi	South Africa	Public affairs
2007	Dr. Syeda Saiyidain Hameed	Delhi	Public affairs
2007	Teesta Setalvad	Maharashtra	Public affairs
2008	Justice (Dr.) Adarsh Sein Anand	Uttar Pradesh	Public affairs
2008	P.N. Dhar	Delhi	Public affairs
2008	Pranab Mukherjee	Delhi	Public affairs
2008	Yuli M. Vorontsov (posthumous)	Russia	Public affairs
2008	Mian Bashir Ahmad	Jammu and Kashmir	Public affairs
2008	Lord Meghnad Jagdishchandra Desai	United Kingdom	Public affairs
2008	Colette Mathur	Switzerland	Public affairs
2009	Govind Narain	Uttar Pradesh	Public affairs
2009	(Smt.) Inderjit Kaur Barthakur	Meghalaya	Public affairs
2009	Kirit Shantilal Parikh	Delhi	Public affairs
2009	Shyamlha Pappu	Delhi	Public affairs
2009	K. Asungba Sangtam	Nagaland	Public affairs

== 2010–2019 ==
Year	Name	State	Field
2010	Yaga Venugopal Reddy	Telangana	Public affairs
2010	Abhijit Sen	Delhi	Public affairs
2010	Sailesh Kumar Bandyopadhyay	West Bengal	Public affairs
2010	Sant Singh Chatwal	United States	Public affairs
2010	Rafael Iruzubieta Fernandez	Spain	Public affairs
2010	Gulam Mohammad Mir	Jammu and Kashmir	Public affairs
2011	Akhlaq Ur Rahman Kidwai	Delhi	Public affairs
2011	Vijay Laxman Kelkar	Maharashtra	Public affairs
2011	K Parasaran	Delhi	Public affairs
2011	Montek Singh Ahluwalia	Delhi	Public affairs
2011	Prof. (Dr) Upendra Baxi	United Kingdom	Public affairs
2011	Anant Darshan Shankar	Karnataka	Public affairs
2012	Patibandla Chandrasekhara Rao	Germany	Public affairs
2012	George Yong-Boon Yeo	Singapore	Public affairs
2012	Pravin Harjivandas Parekh	Delhi	Public affairs
2012	Yezdi Hirji Malegam	Maharashtra	Public affairs
2013	Shivajirao Girdhar Patil	Maharashtra	Public affairs
2014	Justice Dalveer Bhandari	Netherlands	Public affairs
2014	Hasmukh Chimanlal Shah	Gujarat	Public affairs
2014	Ashok Kumar Mago	United States	Public affairs
2014	Tashi Tondup	Jammu and Kashmir	Public affairs
2015	Pandit Madan Mohan Malaviya (posthumous)	Uttar Pradesh	Public affairs
2015	Atal Bihari Vajpayee	Delhi	Public affairs
2015	K.K. Venugopal	Delhi	Public affairs
2015	Lal Kishinchand Advani	Delhi	Public affairs
2015	Sardar Parkash Singh Badal	Punjab	Public affairs
2015	Subhash C. Kashyap	Delhi	Public affairs
2015	Harish Narendra Salve	Delhi	Public affairs
2015	Saichiro Misumi	Japan	Public affairs
2016	Jagmohan	Delhi	Public affairs
2016	Ravindra Chandra Bhargava	Uttar Pradesh	Public affairs
2016	Robert Dean Blackwill	United States	Public affairs
2016	M.N. Krishnamani	Delhi	Public affairs
2016	Mahesh Chander Mehta	Delhi	Public affairs
2016	Tokheho H. Sema	Nagaland	Public affairs
2016	Ujjwal Deorao Nikam	Maharashtra	Public affairs
2017	Purno Agitok Sangma (posthumous)	Meghalaya	Public affairs
2017	Sharadchandra Govindrao Pawar	Maharashtra	Public affairs
2017	Murli Manohar Joshi	Uttar Pradesh	Public affairs
2017	Sunder Lal Patwa (posthumous)	Madhya Pradesh	Public affairs
2018	His Excellency Alexander Kadakin (posthumous)	Russia	Public affairs
2018	Bhabani Charan Pattanaik	Odisha	Public affairs
2018	Tommy Koh	Singapore	Public affairs
2018	His Excellency Shri Hun Many	Cambodia	Public affairs
2018	Thant Myint-U	Myanmar	Public affairs
2019	Pranab Mukherjee	Delhi	Public affairs
2019	His Excellency Shri Ismail Omar Guelleh	Djibouti	Public affairs
2019	Sardar Sukhdev Singh Dhindsa	Punjab	Public affairs
2019	Pravin Jamnadas Gordhan	South Africa	Public affairs
2019	Kariya Munda	Jharkhand	Public affairs
2019	Hukumdev Narayan Yadav	Bihar	Public affairs
2019	Bhagirathi Devi	Bihar	Public affairs
2019	Harvinder Singh Phoolka	Punjab	Public affairs

== 2020–2025 ==
Year	Name	State	Field
2020	George Fernandes (posthumous)	Delhi	Public affairs
2020	Arun Jaitley (posthumous)	Delhi	Public affairs
2020	Sir Anerood Jugnauth	Mauritius	Public affairs
2020	Sushma Swaraj (posthumous)	Delhi	Public affairs
2020	Syed Muazzem Ali (posthumous)	Bangladesh	Public affairs
2020	Muzaffar Hussain Baig	Jammu and Kashmir	Public affairs
2020	S. C. Jamir	Nagaland	Public affairs
2020	Neelakanta Ramakrishna Madhava Menon (posthumous)	Kerala	Public affairs
2020	Manohar Gopalkrishna Prabhu Parrikar (posthumous)	Goa	Public affairs
2020	Robert John Blackman	United Kingdom	Public affairs
2020	Barry Strachan Gardiner	United Kingdom	Public affairs
2021	Shinzo Abe	Japan	Public affairs
2021	Tarun Gogoi (posthumous)	Assam	Public affairs
2021	Sumitra Mahajan	Madhya Pradesh	Public affairs
2021	Ram Vilas Paswan (posthumous)	Bihar	Public affairs
2021	Keshubhai Patel (posthumous)	Gujarat	Public affairs
2021	Sardar Tarlochan Singh	Haryana	Public affairs
2021	Bijoya Chakravorty	Assam	Public affairs
2021	Lt. Col. Quazi Sajjad Ali Zahir (Retd.) Bir Protik Swadhinata Padak	Bangladesh	Public affairs
2022	Kalyan Singh (posthumous)	Uttar Pradesh	Public affairs
2022	Ghulam Nabi Azad	Jammu and Kashmir	Public affairs
2022	Maljibhai Devjibhai Desai	Gujarat	Public affairs
2023	Somanahalli Mallaiah Krishna	Karnataka	Public affairs
2023	Mulayam Singh Yadav (posthumous)	Uttar Pradesh	Public affairs
2023	Narendra Chandra Debbarma (posthumous)	Tripura	Public affairs
2023	Thounaojam Chaoba Singh	Manipur	Public affairs
2024	Muppavarapu Venkaiah Naidu	Andhra Pradesh	Public affairs
2024	Justice M. Fathima Beevi (posthumous)	Kerala	Public affairs
2024	Satya Brata Mookherjee (posthumous)	West Bengal	Public affairs
2024	Ram Naik	Maharashtra	Public affairs
2024	O. Rajagopal	Kerala	Public affairs
2024	Sasindran Muthuvel	Papua New Guinea	Public affairs
2024	P. V. Narasimha Rao (posthumous)	Telangana	Public affairs
2024	Chaudhary Charan Singh (posthumous)	Uttar Pradesh	Public affairs
2024	Karpoori Thakur (posthumous)	Bihar	Public affairs
2024	Lal Kishinchand Advani	Delhi	Public affairs
2025	Justice (Retd.) Shri Jagdish Singh Khehar	Chandigarh	Public affairs
2025	Manohar Joshi (posthumous)	Maharashtra	Public affairs
2025	Sushil Kumar Modi (posthumous)	Bihar	Public affairs
2025	C S Vaidyanathan	Delhi	Public affairs
2025	Manda Krishna Madiga	Telangana	Public affairs
2025	Narayan (Bhulai Bhai) (posthumous)	Uttar Pradesh	Public affairs
