= R. C. Cooper =

Indian politician and chartered accountant

Rustom Cavasjee Cooper (18 August 1922 – 18 June 2013) was an Indian politician and chartered accountant. He served as treasurer and general-secretary of Swatantra Party. Between 1963 – 1964, he also served as president of Institute of Chartered Accountants of India.

== Early life ==
R. C. Cooper got his early education from Sydenham College of Commerce and Economics and University School of Economics in Bombay. Later, he received his PhD from London School of Economics.

On 19 December 1954, Cooper married Zarin Mehta. They both had two daughters.

== Positions held ==
- 1960-65 – Member, Research Programmes Committee in Ministry of Finance.
- 1960-71 – Senior Partner, Touche, Ross, Bailey & Smart.
- 1963-64 – President, Institute of Chartered Accountants of India.
- 1964-65 – Member, Central Direct Taxes Advising Committee.
- 1964-66 – chairman, Bennett, Coleman.
- 1966 – Vice Chairman, Indian Merchants' Chamber.
- 1967 – President, Indian Merchants' Chamber.

== Rustom Cavasjee Cooper vs Union of India ==
On 19 July 1969, Acting President V. V. Giri gave assent to the ordinance prepared by Indira Gandhi's government to nationalize fourteen banks, which held the deposits of more than fifty crores rupees. On 20 July 1969, Cooper who was one of the shareholders in Central Bank of India, Bank of Baroda, Union Bank of India and Bank of India filed petition in Supreme Court of India challenging the ordinance and claiming violation of their rights under Article 14, Article 19 and Article 31 of Indian Constitution.

On 21 July 1969, Indira Gandhi's government brought Banking Companies (Acquisition and Transfer of Undertakings) Act on the floor of Parliament of India. On 22 July 1969, an eight-judge bench of Supreme Court gave interim order restraining the government to remove banks chairmen and giving the direction to the banks under Banking Companies Act 1968, despite Attorney-General Niren De's argument that nationalization is a policy decision and not subject to court scrutiny. On 4 August 1969, Parliament of India passed Banking Companies (Acquisition and Transfer of Undertakings) Act 1969.

On 10 February 1970, eleven-judge bench of Supreme Court with a majority judgement of ten to one struck down the Act. Section 15(2)(e) of the Act was held unreasonable by the bench which prohibited these banks from carrying on banking business. But the court ruled that the said Act is not violative of Article 19(1)(f) as the State has the right to carry absolute monopoly, giving reference to Akadasi Padhan vs State Of Orissa judgement of 1962. Justice A. N. Ray was the lone dissenter in this eleven-judge bench. He held that the compensation fixed by legislature cannot be questioned in court.

In this case, Justice Jayantilal Chhotalal Shah presided over the bench. Chief Justice of India Mohammad Hidayatullah recused himself from the case as he gave the assent to the Act as an Acting President. R. C. Cooper was represented by lawyers Nanabhoy Palkhivala, M. C. Chagla, J. B. Dadachanji, etc. Government side was represented by Attorney-General Niren De, Solicitor General Jagdish Swarup, M. C. Setalvad, C. K. Daphtary, etc. Intervenor for the government included Mohan Kumaramangalam, V. K. Krishna Menon, etc.
