= Tushar Mehta =

Solicitor General of India

Solicitor General of India
- Incumbent
- Assumed office 10 October 2018
- Appointed by: Ram Nath Kovind
- Preceded by: Ranjit Kumar

Additional Solicitor General of India
- In office 7 June 2014 – 10 October 2018
- Appointed by: Pranab Mukherjee

Additional Advocate General, State of Gujarat
- In office 16 December 2008 – 7 June 2014

Personal details
- Born: 11 September 1964 (age 62) Jamnagar, Gujarat, India
- Children: 2
- Occupation: Senior Advocate

Tushar Mehta is a senior counsel in India and is currently serving as the Solicitor General of India. He is the second-longest serving solicitor general of India after C. K. Daphtary.

== Education and career ==
Mehta attended the Gujarat University, where he obtained his law degree and received five gold medals. He has also received honorary doctorates from Amity University, Noida and Karnataka State Law University.

After enrolling as an advocate with the Bar Council of Gujarat in 1987, Mehta began his legal career under Krishnakant Vakharia, a senior advocate at the Gujarat High Court. He was designated as a senior advocate in 2008 at the age of 42 by the Gujarat High Court. He was appointed as the Additional Advocate General for Gujarat in 2008. Mehta was appointed as the Additional Solicitor General of India in 2014. Mehta was then appointed as the Solicitor General of India in 2018 for three years. His term has then been regularly extended since then with the last extension being on 1 July 2026 for another three years.
