= Mukul Rohatgi =

14 th Attorney General for India

Attorney General of India
- In office 19 June 2014 – 18 June 2017
- Appointed by: Pranab Mukherjee (President of India)
- Preceded by: Goolam Essaji Vahanvati
- Succeeded by: K. K. Venugopal

Personal details
- Born: 70 years (17 August 1955)
- Education: Government Law College, Mumbai
- Occupation: Lawyer

Mukul Rohatgi is an Indian lawyer and designated senior counsel, and was the 12th Attorney General for India. He was succeeded by K. K. Venugopal, whom he was also offered to succeed to hold the position again, but he declined. He had a tenure of three years as Attorney General, from 19 June 2014 to 18 June 2017. He is a senior advocate at the Supreme Court of India. He has also served earlier as Additional Solicitor General of India.

== Education ==
Rohatgi completed his studies of law from Government Law College, Mumbai.

== Professional career ==
After graduating in law, he started practice under Yogesh Kumar Sabharwal, who later became 36th Chief Justice of India. He started working with him in the High Court and later started his own legal practice. He was designated as a senior counsel by the Delhi High Court on 3 June 1993. In 1999, he was appointed as Additional Solicitor General of India for the Vajpayee government, an appointment that saw him shift base to the Supreme Court.
