= Lalit Mohan Sharma =

24th Chief Justice of India

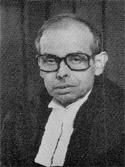

24th Chief Justice of India
- In office 1992–1993
- Appointed by: President Shankar Dayal Sharma
- Preceded by: M.H. Kania
- Succeeded by: M.N. Venkatachaliah

Justice of the Supreme Court of India
- In office 1987-1992

Judge of Patna High Court
- In office 1973-1987

Personal details
- Born: 12 February 1928 Gaya (Bihar)
- Died: 3 November 2008 (aged 80)

Lalit Mohan Sharma (12 February 1928 – 3 November 2008) was an Indian judge, who served as the 24th Chief Justice of India, serving for 85 days, from 18 November 1992 until 11 February 1993. He was the son of L.N. Sinha, former Attorney General of India.

== Legal career ==
Passed B.A. Hons. (Patna University) in 1946. Passed B.L. (Patna University) in 1948. Enrolled as articled clerk in High Court, Patna in 1949. Started practice in High Court, Patna as an Advocate – 6 February 1950. Enrolled as Supreme Court Advocate – 6 March 1957. Later nominated as Senior Advocate. Took charge (oath) as Judge, Patna High Court on 12 April 1973.

He joined the Supreme Court of India on 5 October 1987 and appointed as Chief Justice of India on 18 November 1992. Over the course of his Supreme Court tenure, Sharma authored 157 judgments and sat on 406 benches.

He retired from the judicial service on 11 February 1993.

== Family and early life ==
Lalit Mohan Sharma was born on 12 February 1928 in the village of Musi (Belaganj, Gaya, Bihar) in a Brahmin family. His father, Lal Narayan Sinha, was the Attorney General of India during the Prime Minister-ship of Indira Gandhi and Solicitor General of India from 17 July 1972 until 5 April 1977. His son, Justice Partha Sarthy currently serves as a Judge in the Patna High Court.

== Death ==
Sharma died on 3 November 2008 in Patna at his residence following a long illness. He was 80 years old. He is survived by his wife, son and daughter.

Legal offices
Preceded by Madhukar Hiralal Kania	Chief Justice of India; 18 November 1992 – 11 February 1993	Succeeded by Manepalli Narayana Rao Venkatachaliah
