= Shyam Nath Kacker =

Indian politician

Minister of Law, Justice and Company Affairs of India
- In office 3 August 1979 – 14 January 1980
- Prime Minister: Charan Singh
- Preceded by: H.R. Khanna
- Succeeded by: P. Shiv Shankar

Solicitor General of India
- In office 5 April 1977 – 2 August 1979
- Preceded by: L. N. Sinha
- Succeeded by: Soli Jehangir Sorabjee

Personal details
- Party: Janata Party (Secular)
- Profession: Lawyer, Politician

Shyam Nath Kacker (also known as S. N. Kacker) was an Indian politician and lawyer who served as a Union Cabinet Minister of India in the Charan Singh ministry. On 3 August 1979, he was appointed as the Minister of Law, Justice and Company Affairs of India, following the resignation of his predecessor, H.R. Khanna, who stepped down after one day in office due to political pressure. Kacker remained in this role until 14 January 1980. He was affiliated with the Janata Party (Secular).

== Career ==
He served as the Senior Standing Counsel to the Uttar Pradesh State Government and the Advocate General of Uttar Pradesh for six years. After moving to New Delhi to practice in the Supreme Court of India, he was appointed Solicitor General of India and held that position for over two years. Kacker was known for his ability and fairness in his role as Solicitor General. From 3 August 1979 until 14 January 1980, Shyam Nath Kacker served as the Minister of Law, Justice and Company Affairs of India in Chaudhary Charan Singh's ministry.

Kacker was an active member of various bar councils. He served as the Chairman of the Bar Council of Uttar Pradesh, a member of the Bar Council of India, and later, the President of the Supreme Court Bar Association in 1986.

He also served as the Mayor of Allahabad till 1969 and was also re-elected in 1970.
