= K. K. Venugopal =

Indian constitutional lawyer

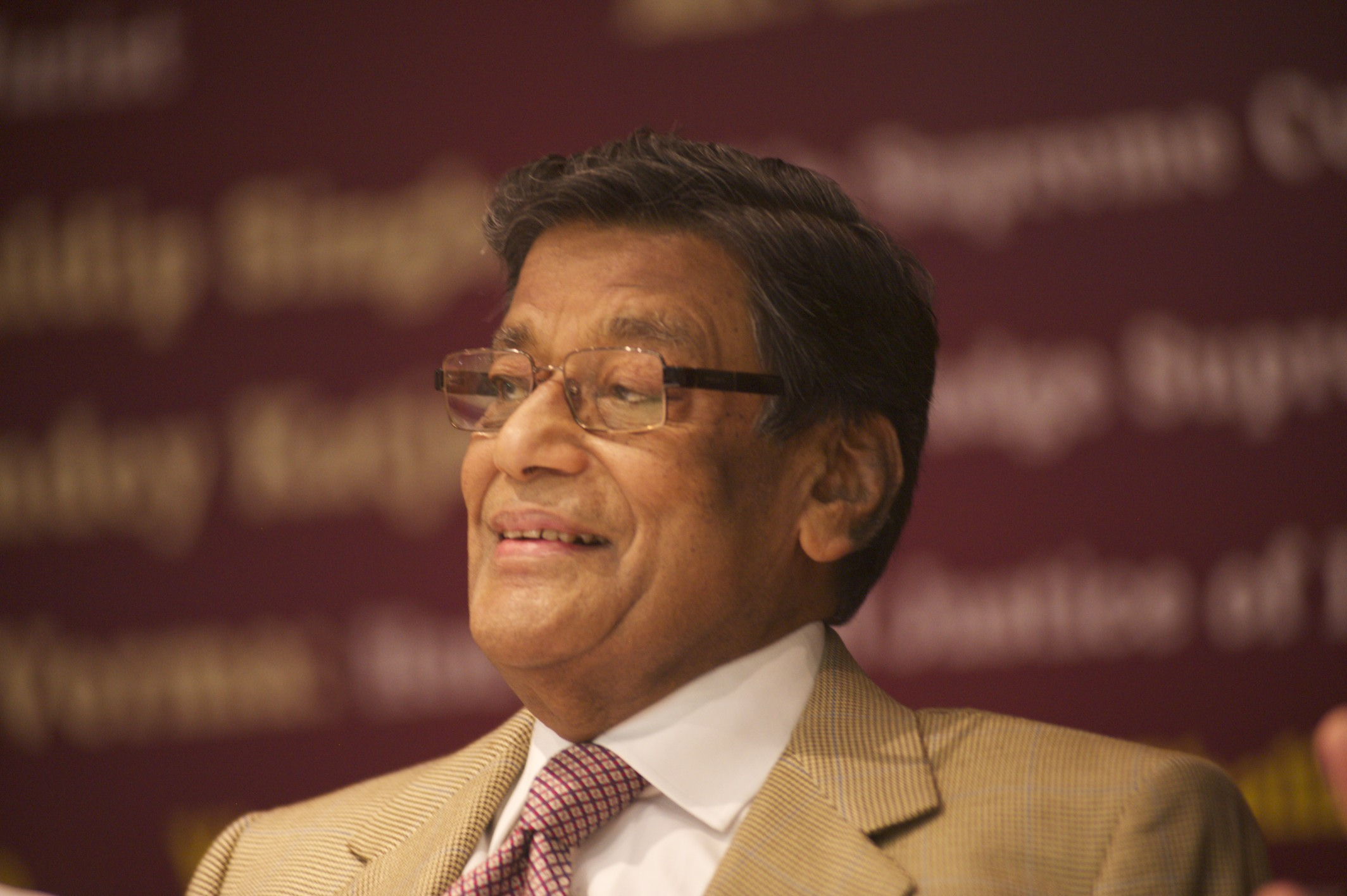

13th Attorney-General for India
- In office 1 July 2017 – 30 September 2022
- Prime Minister: Narendra Modi
- Preceded by: Mukul Rohatgi
- Succeeded by: R. Venkataramani

Personal details
- Born: Kottayan Katankot Venugopal; 6 September 1931 (age 95) Kanhangad, South Canara, Madras Presidency, British India (present day Kasaragod, Kerala, India)
- Education: Raja Lakhamgouda Law College, Belgaum
- Occupation: Lawyer
- Awards: Padma Vibhushan (2015); Padma Bhushan (2002)

Kottayan Katankot Venugopal (born 6 September 1931) is an Indian constitutional lawyer and a senior advocate in the Supreme Court of India. He was enrolled as an advocate on 27 January 1954. On 1 July 2017, he was appointed as the Attorney General of India and retired on 30 September 2022. He is Patron of SAARCLAW (A regional apex body of SAARC) and earlier has been its President. He is founder of M K Nambyar SAARCLAW Centre For Advanced Legal Studies at the NALSAR University of Law.

== Early life and education ==
Venugopal was born in a Nair family to Meloth Krishnan Nambiar and Kalyani Nambiar in Kanhangad, a town in the South Canara district of the Madras Presidency of British India (present-day Kerala), and grew up in Mangalore.

Venugopal was a student at St. Aloysius College, Mangalore. He then enrolled at Madras Christian College, Chennai, to complete his degree in Physics and dropped out as he fell ill during the final exams. Afterwards, he did his degree in Law at Raja Lakhamgouda Law College, Belgaum.

== Career ==
In 1970, K.K. Venugopal appeared in the Supreme Court of India on behalf of an aspiring medical student for his MBBS admission in the state of Tamil Nadu. The opposing junior lawyer was P. Chidambaram, who later became the Finance Minister of India. He appeared on behalf of Dr. A. Peeriakaruppan s/o Dr. P. R. Annamalai MD and the Chief Justice Hegde gave the verdict on 15 January 1971 in favor of the aspiring Medical Student Periakaruppan and the State of Tamil Nadu lost its Case. This is a landmark decision, that gave more weightage for the merit rather than other influences.

Venugopal was the President of the Supreme Court Bar Association (1990–91, 1994–95 and 1999-2000). He was President of the Union Internationale des Avocats (UIA - International Association of Lawyers) from 1996 to 1997.

Venugopal has appeared in many high-profile cases. He was appointed by the Royal Government of Bhutan to serve as the Constitutional adviser for drafting of the Constitution of Bhutan. He has advised the then President of Sri Lanka, Chandrika Bandaranaike Kumaratunga, on the devolution of powers on the Tamil regions of Sri Lanka (2004). On 30 June 2017, he was appointed as the Attorney General of India under the leadership of Prime Minister Narendra Modi. He succeeded Mukul Rohatgi, who stepped down after the first term. Venugopal held the office of Additional Solicitor General in Morarji Desai’s Government. He has appeared in a variety of cases in the last 50 years. Venugopal was appointed as amicus curiae to assist the Supreme Court in the high profile 2G spectrum case.

He appeared for the BJP leader L. K. Advani in the Demolition of the Babri Masjid case.

Other well-known lawyers have been trained under his tutelage.

== Honours ==
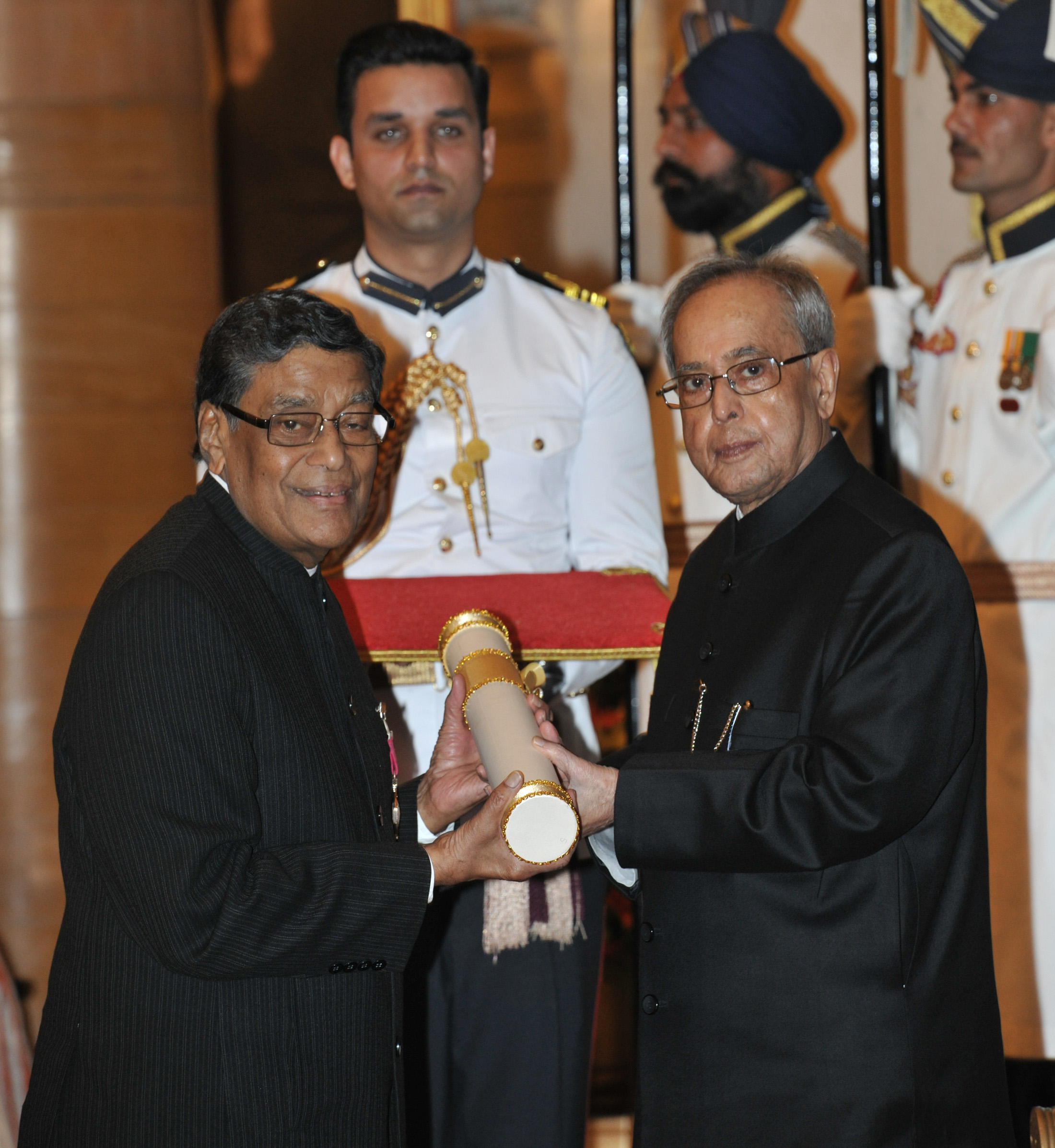
The President, Shri Pranab Mukherjee presenting the Padma Vibhushan to Shri K. K. Venugopal, at a Civil Investiture Ceremony, at Rashtrapati Bhavan, in New Delhi on 8 April 2015

In 2015, he was conferred Padma Vibhushan award by the Government of India. This is the second-highest civilian honour in India. In 2002, he was awarded Padma Bhushan, the third-highest civilian honour. He was awarded the Vidhi Ratna in 2023 by the Bar Council of India for his outstanding contribution to the Legal Profession. He received the "Lifetime Achievement Award" from the US-India Business Council in 2012.

He was conferred the Honoris Causa Degree of Doctor of Laws by (1) the Utkal University, Orissa, in 2010; (2) by the Chanakya National Law University, Patna, in 2018; and (3) by the NALSAR University of Law, Hyderabad, in 2019.

== Opinion on judicial reforms ==
Venugopal is one of the main advocates for judicial reforms in India. He is against the creation of regional benches of the Supreme Court of India. Instead, he recommends that Courts of Appeal be established in the four regions of the country, who finally decide on appeals from the High Court judgments in all cases other than cases of national importance which affect the whole country, disputes between States or between States and the Centre, Presidential references and substantial questions of law relating to interpretation of the Constitution. This will relieve the burden on the Supreme Court.
