= Harish Salve =

Indian advocate (born 1955)

- Official portrait

Solicitor General of India
- In office 1 November 1999 – 3 November 2002
- Preceded by: N. Santosh Hegde
- Succeeded by: Kirit Raval

Personal details
- Born: 22 June 1955 (age 71) Warud, Sindkheda, Dhule, Maharashtra, India
- Spouses: Meenakshi Salve (m. 1982; div. 2020) Caroline Brossard (m. 2020; div. 2023) Trina (m. 2023)
- Children: 2
- Education: Nagpur University (BCom, LLB); Institute of Chartered Accountants of India
- Profession: Senior Advocate
- Awards: Padma Bhushan

Harish Salve is an Indian senior advocate who practices at the Supreme Court of India. He served as the Solicitor General of India from 1 November 1999 to 3 November 2002. He also fought the case of Kulbhushan Jadhav at the International Court of Justice (ICJ). On 16 January 2020 he was appointed as a King's Counsel for the courts of England and Wales.

== Background and family ==
Harish Salve was born into a Marathi family. His father, N. K. P. Salve, was a chartered accountant and prominent politician of the Indian National Congress. His mother, Ambriti Salve, was a doctor. His grandfather, P.K. Salve, was a successful criminal lawyer and his great-grandfather (father of P.K. Salve) was a munsif (subordinate judge). Salve who is a Christian, grew in a multi-religious family with a liberal secularism at his home. He is nephew of Shri Mataji Nirmala Srivastava was the founder and guru of Sahaja Yoga, a new religious movement.

== Early Schooling and formative years ==
He did his schooling at St. Francis De'Sales High School, Nagpur, Maharashtra. He completed his Chartered Accountancy from ICAI and LLB from Nagpur University. The former chief Justice of India Sharad Arvind Bobde was his classmate in school. Before he became a lawyer, Salve practised Chartered Accountancy in taxation. He began his legal career as an intern in 1980 at JB Dadachandji & Co.

== Career ==
He began his legal career in 1980 at J. B. Dadachandji & Co., first as an intern, and later as a full-time lawyer. During this time, he assisted Palkhivala in the Minerva Mills case (case citation: AIR 1980 SC 1789). Salve was later designated a Senior Counsel by the Delhi High Court.

Salve worked with former Attorney General, Soli Sorabjee, from 1980 to 1986. He declined to be nominated for a second three-year term due to "personal reasons" when his first term ended in November 2002. He later clarified that his wife was unhappy with him bringing work home.

Salve was appointed as Amicus Curiae by the Supreme Court in some cases, mostly relating to preservation of the environment. However, in 2011, he recused himself from this position during a hearing on illegal mining, on the grounds that he had previously appeared for one or more of the parties.

In 2013, Salve was admitted to the English Bar and subsequently joined the Blackstone Chambers.

=== Major cases and clients ===
Harish Salve argued the first Anti-Dumping case in the Supreme Court of India. He frequently represents large corporations like Mukesh Ambani's Reliance Industries Limited. He has appeared in the Krishna Godavari Basin gas dispute case against the latter's brother, Anil Ambani's Reliance Natural Resources Limited.

Other clients include the Tata Group, ITC Limited, whom he has represented on various in matters. He has appeared for several Tata group companies. He has also appeared for Ratan Tata himself.

Salve represented Vodafone in its $2.5 billion tax dispute with the Indian government. He initially lost the case in the Bombay High Court, but later won it at the Supreme Court after taking a temporary residence in London and relocating his office there to focus solely on the case. Salve was extremely critical of the Indian government for passing a retrospective clarification to the Income Tax law in the 2012 Union Budget, which nullified the Supreme Court's decision.

Salve appeared for Bilkis Bano, a victim of the Gujarat Riots, at the behest of the National Human Rights Commission in 2003. He also appeared as a defence counsel in the Aarushi-Hemraj double murder case.

In 2015, he took up the high-profile case of actor Salman Khan. The actor was earlier sentenced to five years in jail for a 2002 hit-and-run accident that left one man dead and four others injured. Senior counsel Amit Desai, a Mumbai-based lawyer replaced Salve for a short time in the Salman Khan trial. The Bombay High Court eventually suspended the sessions court decision and on 10 December 2015 acquitted Salman Khan of all charges for the 2002 hit-and-run and drunk-and-drive case.

In May 2017, he represented India before the International Court of Justice in the Kulbhushan Jadhav case. Jadhav was sentenced to death by a Pakistani military court on charges of spying. Due to his efforts, the International Court of Justice has ordered a provisional stay on Jadhav's execution until a final verdict is declared. For this case he charged only ₹1(INR) in legal fees. India Today magazine ranked him 43rd in India's 50 Most powerful people of 2017 list.

== Personal life ==
Harish Salve first married to Meenakshi Salve and their marriage lasted for 38 years. He lives and works in North London. Salve divorced Meenakshi in the June 2020 and married Caroline Brossard, a London-based artist, on October 28, 2020. Harish Salve had first met Brossard at an art event. He has two daughters, Sakshi and Saaniya, from his first marriage.

On September 3, 2023, Salve married to Trina in London at a ceremony attended by notable figures like Nita Ambani and fugitives from Indian law like Lalit Modi and Moin Qureshi.
