= Kirit Raval =

Indian advocate

Kirit Raval (died April 26, 2005) was an Indian attorney who served as the Solicitor General of India from 2002 until 2004. Raval served as an Additional Solicitor General of India from 1998 to 2002, when he succeeded Harish Salve as the Solicitor General. He, in turn, was succeeded by G. E. Vahanvati beginning in 2004. He was the first Solicitor General of India to hail from the state of Gujarat. He studied management at the Indian Institute of Management Ahmedabad. He died of cancer on April 26, 2005.
