= A. Sudershan Reddy =

A. Sudershan Reddy (born 25 May 1959) is a Senior Advocate in the Telangana High Court and the current Advocate General for the State of Telangana. He was also the first lawyer from the Telangana region to hold the position since the formation of the erstwhile unified state of Andhra Pradesh in 1956.

== Early life and education ==
A native of Rechepalli village in Sarangapur mandal of Jagtial District, Sudershan Reddy completed his schooling at St. Paul’s School, pursued his undergraduate studies at Nizam College, and obtained his law degree from Osmania University.

== Career ==
Sudershan Reddy enrolled as an advocate in 1985, beginning his legal practice in the district courts and the High Court. He also worked as a part-time lecturer at the Post Graduate College of Law, Osmania University, from 1988 to 1991, where he taught the Criminal Procedure Code and the Transfer of Property Act.

He was appointed the Advocate General for the erstwhile State of Andhra Pradesh from 2011 to 2014, during Kiran Kumar Reddy’s tenure as the Chief Minister. He became the first lawyer from the Telangana region to hold this post since the formation of the erstwhile united Andhra Pradesh in 1956.

After the bifurcation of the erstwhile Andhra Pradesh, Governor E.S.L. Narasimhan issued an order for his continuation, along with his team, to represent both Telangana and the residuary State of Andhra Pradesh during President’s Rule until new Advocate Generals were appointed. He also served as the AG for AP and Telangana during the President’s Rule in 2014, during the demarcation of the State of erstwhile Andhra Pradesh.
