= H. R. Bhardwaj =

Indian politician (1939–2020)

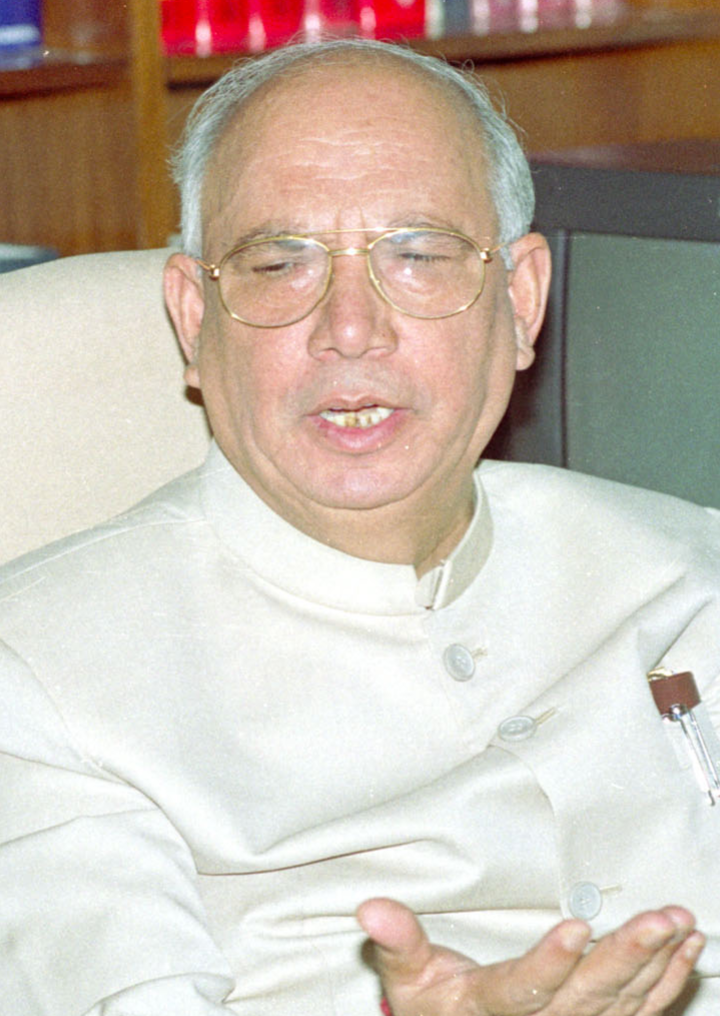

11th Governor of Karnataka
- In office 25 June 2009 – 28 June 2014
- Chief Minister: B. S. Yediyurappa; D. V. Sadananda Gowda; Jagadish Shettar; Siddaramaiah
- Preceded by: Rameshwar Thakur
- Succeeded by: Vajubhai Vala

Governor of Kerala
- Additional Charge
- In office 1 March 2012 – 9 March 2013
- Chief Minister: Oommen Chandy
- Preceded by: M. O. H. Farook
- Succeeded by: Nikhil Kumar

27th Minister of Law and Justice
- In office 22 May 2004 – 28 May 2009
- Prime Minister: Manmohan Singh
- Preceded by: Arun Jaitley
- Succeeded by: Veerappa Moily

Personal details
- Born: 16 May 1939 Gahri Sampla Kiloi, Punjab, British India (present-day Haryana, India)
- Died: 8 March 2020 (aged 80) New Delhi, India
- Party: Indian National Congress

Hansraj Bhardwaj (16 May 1939 – 8 March 2020) was an Indian politician who was Governor of Karnataka from 2009 to 2014; he also served as Governor of Kerala from 2012 until 2013. He was a member of the Indian National Congress. He holds the record of having the second longest tenure in Law Ministry since independence, after Ashoke Kumar Sen. He was the minister of state for nine years and a cabinet minister for law and justice for five years. At the end of his five-year term in 2014, Governor of Tamil Nadu, former Chief Minister of Andhra Pradesh Konijeti Rosaiah replaced Bharadwaj as Governor of Karnataka.

On 16 January 2012, he was given the additional charge of Governor of Kerala, which he abandoned on 9 March 2013.

== Political career ==
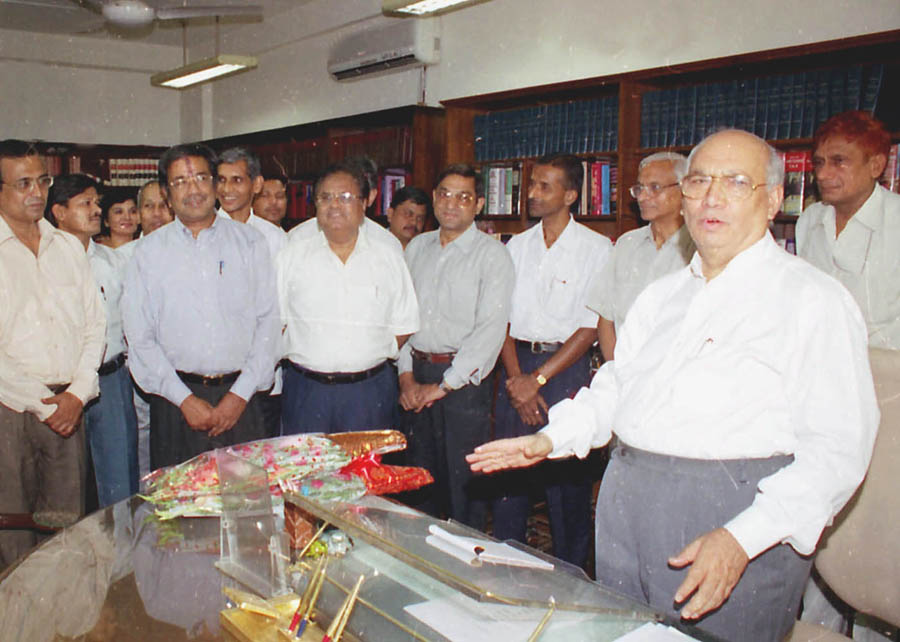
Shri H. R. Bhardwaj assumes the charge of Union Minister of Law and Justice in New Delhi on 24 May 2004

Bhardwaj was first elected to the Rajya Sabha in April 1982. He served as Minister of State in the Ministry of Law and Justice from 31 December 1984 to November 1989 and was re-elected to the Rajya Sabha in April 1988. He was then Minister of State (Independent Charge) in the Ministry of Planning and Programme Implementation from 21 June 1991 to 2 July 1992 and Minister of State in the Ministry of Law, Justice and Company Affairs from 3 July 1992 to May 1996. He was again re-elected to the Rajya Sabha in April 1994 and April 2000, and from 22 May 2004 to 28 May 2009 he served as Union Cabinet Minister of Law and Justice.

Having previously represented Madhya Pradesh in the Rajya Sabha, Bhardwaj was instead elected to the Rajya Sabha from Haryana on 20 March 2006, without opposition.

Bhardwaj introduced the concept of rural courts (gram nyayalayas) during the UPA-I government, later to be discontinued by the government due to scarcity of funds.

A Nehru-Gandhi family loyalist, he handled the most sensitive and controversial cases in the Manmohan Singh cabinet between 2004 and 2009. From the Bofors corruption scandal to Office of Profit and the failed attempt to remove Navin Chawla as election commissioner, they were all handled by Bhardwaj to the satisfaction of the Prime Minister and party leadership.

== Controversies ==
=== Bofors scandal ===
In March 2009, H. R. Bhardwaj was criticized for taking the initiative to de-freeze two bank accounts of Ottavio Quattrocchi, an accused in the Bofors Scam case. In particular, it appears he did not consult the investigating agency CBI which had gotten the accounts frozen.

=== As Governor of Karnataka ===
In July 2010, his comments on the powerful Bellary brothers, ministers in the B.S. Yeddyurappa government, particularly demanding their sacking for their alleged involvement in illegal mining generated a national debate. This was preceded by Bhardwaj rejecting the resignation of Lokayukta, Justice Hegde.

Bharadwaj also received much flak from the public and media for his unceremonious, scathing personal attack on Mysore university vice-chancellor V G Talawar when the latter was initiating action against former vice-chancellor J Shashidhar Prasad. Prasad is accused of committing irregularities in the recruitment of around 200 professors and readers during his tenure between 2003 and 2007 which are yet to be proved.

On 21 January 2011, Governor Bhardwaj sanctioned the prosecution of Chief Minister of Karnataka (Yeddyurappa) under Prevention of Corruption Act, following several allegations of his involvement in land scams and seizure of trucks carrying illegally mined iron ore. However, on 7 March Karnataka High Court quashed this decision and the Lokayukta Police FIR. The court observed, "The petitioner was condemned unheard and there is flagrant violation of principles of natural justice, fairness in administrative action and statutory provision". On 7 February 2011, Bharadwaj withheld the approval of honorary doctorate by the Bangalore University to noted historian and Kannada writer M. Chidananda Murthy. Chidananda Murthy had backed justice BK Somasekhara Commission's report on church attacks in Karnataka in 2008. Akhila Bharata Kannada Sahitya Sammelana 2011, held in Bangalore, adopted a resolution to "condemn" the Governor's decision. Taking note of this, Bharadwaj agreed to give his approval after recommendations from Bangalore university syndicates.

In May 2011, Bhardwaj recommended President's rule in Karnataka after the ruling government lost support in the legislative assembly due to the level of charges brought against it and was forced to prove majority, having a very narrow win.

== Trivia ==
Speaking at an Editors' Guild seminar, Shekhar Gupta, Editor-in-Chief of The Indian Express, narrated an incident involving Arun Shourie and Bhardwaj. During discussions that followed Rajiv Gandhi's Defamation Bill, Bhardwaj had asked Shourie to be more respectful in speaking since Bharadwaj had practiced law in Shourie's father's court in Rohtak. In response Shourie said "This much law should be known even to a mofussil lawyer like you".

Political offices
Preceded by Arun Jaitley	Minister of Law and Justice; 2004–2009	Succeeded by Veerappa Moily
Preceded by Rameshwar Thakur	Governor of Karnataka; 2009–2014	Succeeded by Konijeti Rosaiah
