= Swatantra Party =

Defunct Indian political party (1959–1974)

- General Secretary: R. C. Cooper
- Treasurer: R. C. Cooper
- Founder: C. Rajagopalachari
- Founded: 4 June 1959; 67 years ago
- Dissolved: 4 August 1974; 52 years ago
- Split from: Indian National Congress
- Merged into: Bharatiya Lok Dal
- Ideology: Conservatism (Indian); Liberalism (Indian); Liberal conservatism; Agrarianism; Secularism
- Political position: Centre-right to right-wing
- Colours: Blue

Election symbol

The Swatantra Party (lit. 'Free Party' or 'Independent Party') was an Indian classical liberal political party that existed from 1959 to 1974. It was founded by C. Rajagopalachari in reaction to the increasingly socialist and statist outlook of the ruling Indian National Congress government under prime minister Jawaharlal Nehru.

The party had a number of distinguished leaders, most of them old Congress leaders, like C. Rajagopalachari, Minoo Masani, N. G. Ranga, Darshan Singh Pheruman, Udham Singh Nagoke, and K. M. Munshi.

Swatantra stood for a market-based economy and the dismantling of the "Licence Raj" although it opposed laissez-faire policies. Nehru was highly critical of Swatantra and dubbed it as belonging to "the middle ages of lords, castles, and zamindars".

== History ==
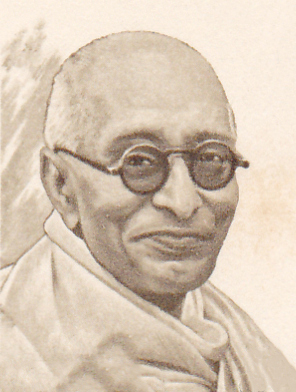
C. Rajagopalachari founded the Swatantra Party. He had been the last Governor-General of India and one of the first recipients of India's highest civilian award, the Bharat Ratna.

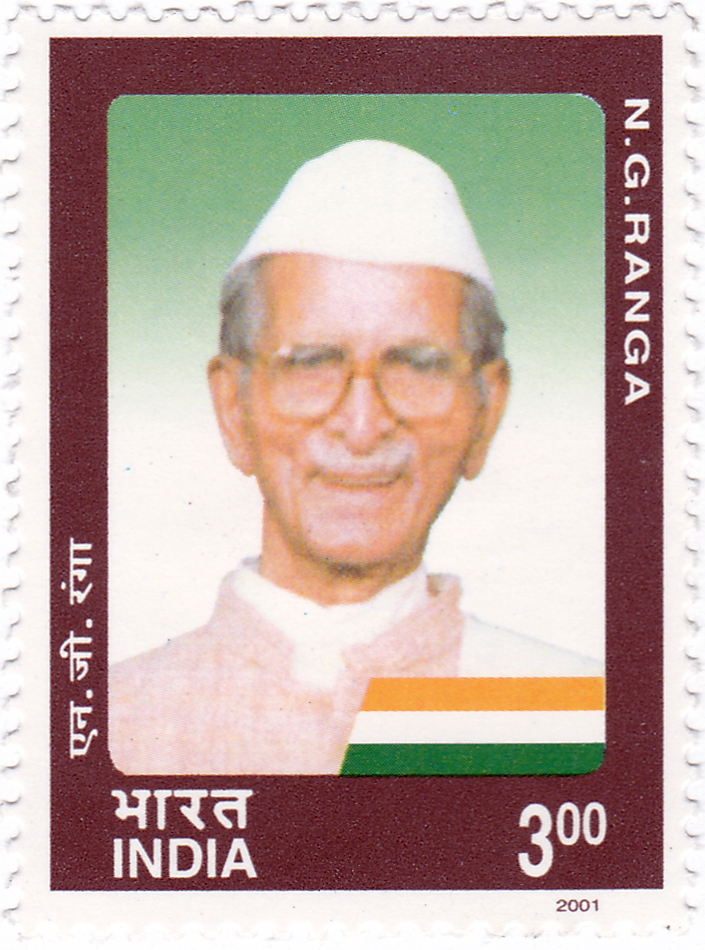
N. G. Ranga was the founder member of the Swatantra Party and its president for several years.

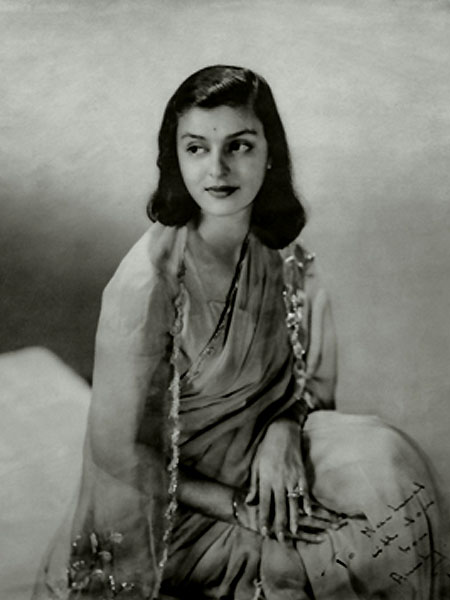
Gayatri Devi, the Maharani of Jaipur and princess of Cooch Behar, was a successful politician in the Swatantra Party.

Bezawada Ramachandra Reddy was the founder member of the Swatantra Party.

== In Parliament ==
N. G. Ranga rebuked the Nehru government for being ill-prepared in defence on 8 November 1962 in a speech during parliamentary debate.

Minoo Masani, the party MP from Rajkot, voiced his opposition to the bank nationalisation bill by Indira Gandhi's government on 25 July 1969.

== Electoral history ==
In the 1962 general election, the first after its formation, Swatantra received 7.89 percent of the total votes and won 18 seats in the third Lok Sabha (1962–67). It emerged as the main opposition to the dominant Congress in four states: Bihar, Rajasthan, Gujarat and Orissa. By the next general election in 1967, Swatantra had become a significant force in some parts of India; it won 8.7 percent of the votes and became the single-largest opposition party in the fourth Lok Sabha (1967–71) with 44 seats. In 1971, Swatantra joined a "Grand Alliance" of parties from across the political spectrum that aimed to defeat Prime Minister Indira Gandhi. The party secured eight seats by winning 3% of the votes. The next year, in 1972, its founder, Rajagopalachari, died, and Swatantra declined rapidly. By 1974, it had dissolved, with many of its members joining the Charan Singh-led Bharatiya Lok Dal.

Year	Election	Popular- vote	Seats
1962	1962 Indian general election	7.9 %	18 / 494
1967	1967 Indian general election	8.7 %	44 / 520
1971	1971 Indian general election	3.1 %	8 / 518

=== State legislative assembly elections ===
==== Odisha ====
Year	Election	Popular- vote		Seats contested	Seats
Year	Election	Votes	%	Seats contested	Seats
1967	1967 Orissa Legislative Assembly election	909,421	22.58%	101	49 / 140
1971	1971 Orissa Legislative Assembly election	767,815	17.44%	115	36 / 140
1974	1974 Orissa Legislative Assembly election	694,473	12.08%	56	21 / 146

==== Rajasthan ====
Year	Election	Popular- vote		Seats contested	Seats
Year	Election	Votes	%	Seats contested	Seats
1962	1962 Rajasthan Legislative Assembly election	878,056	17.11%	93	36 / 176
1967	1967 Rajasthan Legislative Assembly election	1,493,018	22.10%	107	48 / 184
1972	1972 Rajasthan Legislative Assembly election	958,097	12.32%	119	11 / 184

==== Bihar ====
In Bihar state assembly election 1962, party won at 50 seats.

== Ideology ==
=== Fundamental principles ===
The Swatantra Party committed to social justice and equality of opportunity of all people "without distinction of religion, caste, occupation, or political affiliation".

The party felt that progress, welfare and happiness of the people could be achieved by giving maximum freedom to individuals with the state minimising intervention. The state should replace its intervention with fostering the Indian tradition of helping other people directly.

In particular, the party believed that the state should adhere to the Fundamental Rights guaranteed by the Constitution of India and, in particular, should compensate individuals if their property had to be acquired for public purposes. It also believed in giving citizens full freedom to educate their children as they wanted. It recognised the need for increasing food production and sought to do so by giving peasants full land rights and incentives for increasing production in agriculture. In industry, it sought to reduce state presence only to the minimum necessary to supplement private enterprise and in national services like the Indian Railways. It sought to do away with controls on trade and commerce. However, it committed against unreasonable profits, prices and dividends. It believed in placing equal emphasis on the development of capital goods industries, consumer goods industries and rural and small industries. In the fields of taxation and state expenditure, it believed in thrift and called for taxation to suffice for carrying on of administration and social and economic activities taken upon by the state but should not depress capital formation and private investment. The government should also desist from running abnormally large deficits or taking foreign loans that are beyond the capacity of the country to repay. In particular, it resisted unnecessary expansion of the bureaucracy.

==== Opposition to centralization ====
The party opposed the Nehru-Mahalanobis model, an economic development strategy adopted in 1955 that emphasized state-led industrialization and centralized economic planning. Swatantra argued that the model rested on the mistaken assumption that officials in Yojana Bhavan could determine the economic needs and interests of the country’s citizens, entrepreneurs, traders, and farmers better than the individuals themselves. The party regarded the government's self-appraisal of the Third Five Year Plan authored by the Planning Commission under the leadership of Nehru an "honest confession of a dismal failure" and likened the Planning Commission to the Soviet Gosplan and argued that the Planning Commission has become a form of parallel government that should be relegated to an advisory capacity.

While standing for minimising state intervention in the economy, the Swatantra Party committed to securing a fair deal for labour, correlating wages to increased productivity and workers' right to collective bargaining. It also gave their members full freedom to question and criticise any point not included in the fundamental principles of that party.

=== Others ===
Party's fundamental principles had not covered several issues like foreign policy, national language, state reorganisation and religious and social reform.

The party was generally opposed to communism and in 1969, urged the Indian government to ban the three major communist parties in India at that time, the CPI, CPI(M) and the Naxalites, because of their open or tacit support for armed struggles, which the Swatantra Party viewed as a major security threat to the nation.

In foreign affairs, it opposed non-alignment and a close relationship with the Soviet Union and advocated an intimate connection with the United States and Western Europe.

== Decline and legacy ==
In 1969, the Congress party split, leading to consolidation of right-leaning votes under Congress (O). This proved detrimental to the electoral prospects of the Swatantra party. By 1971, the Swatantra party had disintegrated due to infighting and changed political scenarios. The party made some tactical mistakes like joining the Grand Alliance against Indira Gandhi's Congress in 1971 instead of fighting on an issue-based common programme. This resulted in the decimation of the party in the elections of that year. After the death of Rajaji in 1972, personality clashes took a further toll. All this occurred while Indira Gandhi pressurised the royalty to support her. This resulted in Swatantra losing the backing of princes. Another potential benefactor, the business community couldn't advocate for the party since they were too reliant on state patronage. Moreover, big business houses like Birla benefitted from the protectionist aspects of the Nehruvian state and didn't see Swatantra policies as being advantageous.
Finally the party was dissolved on 4 August 1974 by party president Piloo Mody who merged it with Charan Singh's Bharatiya Kranti Dal. The few independent state units except for Maharashtra later merged with Janata Party in 1977.

== See also ==
- Piloo Mody
- S. V. Raju
- V. P. Menon
- H. Ajmal Khan
- Venkatesh Geriti
- Indian National Congress breakaway parties
- R. C. Cooper
- Mariadas Ruthnaswamy

== Sources ==
- Bipan Chandra et al. India Since Independence. Penguin India. 2008 [2011 digital edition].
- Mariadas Ruthnaswamy. "Swatantra Party and its leaders". Swarajya. 30 July 1960.
- Mariadas Ruthnaswamy. "Is Swatantra inspiring enough?". Swarajya. 22 October 1960.
- H. R. Pasricha. The Swatantra Party – Victory in Defeat. Rajaji Foundation. 2002.
- Howard L. Erdman. "India's Swatantra Party". Public Affairs, vol. 36, iss. 4, pp. 394–410. Winter 1963–64.
- Howard L. Erdman. The Swatantra Party and Indian Conservatism. Cambridge University Press. 1967. Digitized by the Internet Archive in 2013.
- Madhavankutty Pillai. "Last Man Standing". Open. 5 April 2014.
- Rajmohan Gandhi. Rajaji: A Life. Penguin India. 1997.
- Ramachandra Guha. India After Gandhi: The History of the World's Largest Democracy. HarperCollins. 2008.
- Rasam Vasanti. Swatantra Party: a political biography. Dattson Publishers, Nagpur. 1997.
- Rasam Vasanti. "Role of Swantantra Party as an Opposition Party (National Level)". Readings on Parliamentary Opposition.
