= Ashok Desai =

Indian lawyer (1932–2020)

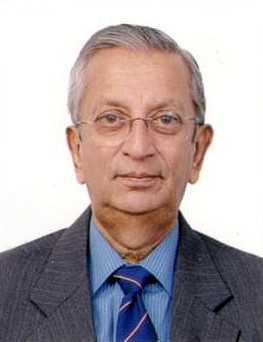

Ashok H. Desai (18 December 1932 – 13 April 2020) was an Indian lawyer, practising in the Supreme Court of India. He held office as the Attorney General of India from 9 July 1996 to 6 May 1998. Earlier, he was the Solicitor General of India from 18 December 1989 to 2 December 1990. He was awarded the Padma Bhushan award and the Law Luminary Award in 2001. He was given an honorary doctorate in "recognition of his contribution to the field of law and jurisprudence" by the North Orissa University in September 2009.

== Education ==
After finishing his schooling in Bombay, he studied at the Fergusson College in Pune and thereafter at the Government Law College, Bombay. He graduated with a law degree in 1952. He thereafter joined the London School of Economics. In the summer of 1955, he was one of the first students from Great Britain to be invited on a study visit to China. In 1956, he graduated from the London University with a BSc in economics. The same year, he was called to the Bar from Lincoln's Inn, London. He was part of the Harvard International Seminar in 1967.

== Career ==
Desai started practice in Bombay High Court in 1956. He was designated as a Senior Advocate on 8 August 1977. As an Advocate he appeared in a large number of cases in the Bombay High Court and the Supreme Court particularly those involving issues of accountability in public life & transparency in Governance. Some of the cases of general interest include:-

(a) Sakharam Binder which struck down the pre censorship of dramatic performances. The play "Sakharam Binder" as being censored by the police on the ground of obscenity. Justice Kania (later on the Chief Justice of India) saw the play at a special audition. He set aside the police decision and also struck down the relevant provisions of the Act as unguided and unconstitutional The trial itself became the subject matter of books and other plays.

(b) Piloo Modi This case been discussed by Professor Gyan Prakash in his book " Mumbai Fables" under the heading " The State On Trial And The City Of Conspiracy ". where the allotment of Backbay land reclamation was set aside. The case advanced the proposition that land belonging to the State must be treated as being held in public trust and must realize a fair price."By lowering the standing threshold, articulating a quasi-trustee standard for the exercise of all government power, and fashioning a resolution that was prospective and ameliorative, Backbay anticipated the robust administrative law and public interest litigation (PIL) jurisprudence developed by the Supreme Court in later years."

(c) Antulay in which cement was distributed by the Chief Minister to builders who happened to give donations to Indira Gandhi Pratishtan. Justice Lentin found that there was quid pro quo and held that the administration was accountable even when it extracted donations for a public trust. The Chief Minister had to resign his office promptly.

He was Legal Correspondent for Times of India from 1963 to 1969. Mr. Desai was Professor of Law in Law College, Bombay from 1964 and Lecturer in Law in Bombay College of Journalism from 1967 to 1972.

Desai moved from Bombay to New Delhi in 1989, when he was appointed Solicitor General of India by Prime Minister V.P. Singh. After December 1990 after resigning as Solicitor General of India, he continued practising in Delhi. He was appointed Attorney General for India on 9 July 1996 by Prime Minister H.D. Devegowda and continued to hold office under Prime Minister I.K. Gujral till he resigned as on 6 May 1998.

Some of the cases of general interest in Supreme Court include the case of –

(a) Ramanna Shetty on the obligation of the State to act fairly. The case dealt with a tender for a food stall in the Bombay Airport where despite the conditions of eligibility a non-eligible person was given the allotment. Justice Bhagwati's extended Article 14 as dealing not only with equality as such but also arbitrariness on the ground that arbitrariness was anathema to equality. "Applying principles of administrative law given the expansion of State’s functions, the Court took upon itself the role of stepping in "to structure and restrict the power of executive government so as to prevent its arbitrary application or exercise "

(b) Narasimha Rao about Parliamentary privilege. The case involved critical parliamentary votes on a motion of ‘no confidence’ which were being obtained by payment of money. The Supreme Court accepted the submission that Member of Parliament would be a public servant and would be subject to the Prevention of Corruption Act. By a narrow majority the Court held that a Member of Parliament had immunity regarding any scrutiny of the reason as to why he cast a vote in a given way and a court could not hold an inquiry into whether he received any bribe to induce him to vote in a given manner;

(c) Vineet Narain about powers of a Court to monitor investigation against political leaders. The Court passed a detailed order after considering the report of Independent Review Committee regarding working of the Central Investigation Agency and Central Vigilance Commission and gave mandatory directions regarding implementing the same. One distinct contribution of the Bench was to evolve the concept of "continuing mandamus" so that a Court could oversee whether its orders were being carried out;

(d) Narmada Dam considered the grievance of those affected by the rising construction of the dam. There were two distinct issues, viz. whether the dam should be built at all and whether there should be relief and rehabilitation of displaced persons. The court resolved the issues by permitting the construction of the dam in stages commensurate at each level with relief and rehabilitation;

(e) Amrendra Singh was on legislative privilege where the court held that while the House had an undoubted right to expel a member for conduct unbecoming member of the House the privilege could not be exercised in relation to an activity that had no bearing on his legislative functions;

(f) Nandini Sunder considered the grievance of the tribal population who were caught in the cross fire between extremist Naxalites and vigilante groups supported by the State. The Court gave extensive reliefs including of ordering investigation. It held "that the appointing of tribal youth with little education as Special Police Officers engaged in counter- insurgency activities is violative of Article 14 and Article 21 "

Desai was the Chairman of the Committee on Administrative Law of International Bar Association in 1986-88 and Consultant to the Commonwealth Workshop on Administrative Law at Lusaka, Zambia in 1990. In 1997, he presented India's Report to the United Nations Committee on Human Rights in Geneva. In 1997 he represented India at W.T.O. Appellate Body in a Patent litigation filed by United States against India. In 1998, he led the Indian delegation to the United Nations Preparatory Committee on Money Laundering Bill in Vienna.

Desai was the Vice President of the Bar Association of India and President of the Inns of Court (India) Society.

== Death ==
Desai died on 13 April 2020. Quite a few good obituaries have appeared in media.

== Publications ==
- Contributed to "Constitutional Laws of India" – Published for Arnold-Heinemann Publishers( India) Ltd.(1986)
- " The Law Shall Prevail: A Relook at the Indian Legal System", Union Internationale Des Avocats, India Chapter, 43rd Congress New- Delhi,3-7 November 1999
- Contributed to "Democracy, Human Rights and the Rule of Law" – Published by Butterworths India (2000);
- Co- Edited and Contributed to " Supreme Court not infallible- Essays in Honour of the Supreme Court of India"; Oxford University Press (2000). Ashok H. Desai and S. Muralidhar; " Public interest Litigation: Potential and Problems";
- The Bombay High Court-"on the High Court as a Constitutional Court"; Eminence Designs (2004);
- Contributed to " Evoking H.M. Seervai Jurist and Authority on the Indian Constitution"; Universal Law Publishing (2005)
- "Judicial Overreach: A critique"; ( 2013) 9 SCC ( Jour) 1
- "1975-1977 Emergency.Some legal recollections."; published Legacy of Law- Bar Association Bombay and (2017) 2 SCC ( Jour) 31
- Contributed a Chapter "Judicial Craftsmanship of Justice Bhagwati: to "Law, Justice & Judicial Power - Justice P N Bhagwati's Approach" edited by Prof. (Dr.) Mool Chand Sharma

== Awards ==
- Golden Anniversary Rotary Prize, University of London, (1956)
- National Law Day award( 2000);
- Padma Bhushan (2001);
- Capital Foundation National Awards (2014)
- Supreme Court of India award "in recognition of his contribution to the development of Constitutional Law of India" (2016)
- Lawyers of India Day Award-conferred by the Bar Association of India for his " outstanding contribution to the development of the legal profession in india".(2016)
- Conferred "Lifetime Achievement Award" in Legal Era Awards (2018–19)

=== Interviews, speeches and lectures ===
- Law Day Speech 1996; (1997) 2 SCC ( Jour) 10.
- 10th Prem Bhatia Memorial Lecture on Dangers to Indian Democracy( 2005)
- Interview on " The Constitution is evolving Constantly";Halsbury Law Monthly, Oct 2008
- Interview by meLAWnge, Annual Magazine 2013-2014
- Justice K. T. Desai Memorial Lecture on "Judicial Overreach: A critique", 2013
