= Mohan Jain =

Mohan Jain, is a senior counsel who served as one of the Additional Solicitor General of India from 2009 to 2014.

Jain has also been Advocate General of Haryana. He was first appointed as additional solicitor-general of India on July 5, 2009, and has represented the Government of India in various landmark cases, including Suresh Kumar Koushal and others v. Naz Foundation and Others case He has also represented the Ministry of Environment and Forests (India). In 2012, he was given an extension for the post of Additional Solicitor General.
