= Milon K. Banerji =

Indian jurist

Attorney General of India
- In office 1992–1996

Personal details
- Born: 1928
- Died: 20 July 2010 (aged 81–82)
- Parent: Amiya Charan Banerjee

Milon Kumar Banerji (c. 1928 – 20 July 2010) was an Indian jurist who was Attorney General of India from 1992 to 1996 and again from 2004 to 2009. He was also Solicitor General from 1986 to 1989. He died on 20 July 2010 after a long illness, having suffered a stroke in December 2009. He was 82.

== Controversies and allegations ==
In 2005, when the UPA government was planning a possible coalition with Mayawati, his opinion absolving Mayawati in the Taj corridor case was ignored by the Supreme Court. In a direct condemnation of the government which asked the CBI to heed Attorney General Milon Banerjee's opinion and close the case against Mayawati, the Supreme Court told the agency not to go solely on the AG's opinion and place all evidence before it.

In 2009, his opinion absolving Ottavio Quattrocchi in the Bofors scandal has also been viewed as "devaluing and eroding the Attorney General's position". A person of the stature of Milon Banerjee, himself a product of Cambridge University and the son of the first lady Magistrate of India Mrs. Probha Banerjee and of the Vice Chancellor of Allahabad University A. C. Banerjee, is the least expected to go to that extreme. He went by the merits of the case, and had no relationship as such with Quattrocchi.
