= Ajit Bharihoke =

Indian judge

Justice Ajit Bharihoke

Additional Judge, Delhi High Court
- In office 14 May 2009 – 16 October 2011

Registrar General, Delhi High Court
- In office 6 January 2007 – 13 May 2009

Personal details
- Education: Punjab University, Chandigarh

Ajit Bharihoke is a former judge of the Delhi High Court. He is known for presiding over several high-profile cases such as the Bofors Scandal, the Jharkhand Mukti Morcha bribery case, the St Kitts case, the Lakhubhai Pathak case, and the Urea Scam.

== Early life, education and career ==
He earned an LLB degree from Panjab University, Chandigarh and subsequently joined Delhi Judicial Service on 7 December 1974. He served in many judicial positions such as Additional District and Sessions Judge, Special Judge Anti Corruption (CBI), etc. He became Registrar General, Delhi High Court from 6 January 2007 to 13 May 2009.

He was appointed as an Additional Judge in Delhi High Court on 14 May 2009 and retired from the post on 16 October 2011.

== Prominent judgements ==
In Jharkhand Mukti Morcha bribery case, he sentenced former Prime Minister PV Narasimha Rao and former Home Minister Buta Singh to three years’ rigorous imprisonment. This was the first case of a Prime Minister to be convicted in a criminal case.
