= Goolam Essaji Vahanvati =

Former Attorney General for India

Goolamhussein E. Vahanvati

11th Attorney General for India
- In office 8 June 2009 – 28 May 2014
- Appointed by: Pratibha Patil (President of India)
- Preceded by: Milon K. Banerjee
- Succeeded by: Mukul Rohatgi

Solicitor General of India
- In office 20 June 2004 – 7 June 2009
- Preceded by: Kirit N. Raval
- Succeeded by: Gopal Subramaniam

Advocate General of Maharashtra
- In office December 1999 – 19 June 2004

Personal details
- Born: 7 May 1949 Mumbai, Maharashtra
- Died: 2 September 2014 (aged 65) Mumbai, Maharashtra
- Spouse(s): Jumana Vahanvaty (first wife, divorced); Nafisa Vahanvati
- Children: Essaji Vahanvati (son by first wife), Sholeen Carrimjee (daughter by first wife)
- Parents: Essabhoy Gulamhusein Vahanvati (father); Tara Essaji Vahanvati (mother)
- Education: St. Xavier's College, Mumbai; Government Law College, Mumbai
- Profession: Lawyer

Goolamhussein Essaji Vahanvati (1949-2014) was an Indian senior counsel who served as the 11th Attorney General for India. His first term in office began in June 2009 and was for three years.

== Early life ==
Goolam was born to Essaji Vahanvati, a lawyer, in a Dawoodi Bohra family.

== Career ==
He started his practice at Bombay High Court and was a junior to Fali S Nariman and later under Soli Sorabjee, Ashok Desai and Ashok Sen. In March 1990, he was designated as a senior advocate. In December 1999, he was appointed as the Advocate General of Maharashtra which he served till June 2004 till he was elevated as the Solicitor General of India, where he handled various important cases, including the Enron cases and the stock market scam.

He appeared in the nine-judge bench hearing on the Ninth Schedule of the Constitution of India, Kuldip Nayar's challenge to the amendment to the Representation of the People's Act with regard to the Rajya Sabha, the tainted Ministers case, in all matters pertaining to the sealing and the challenge to the Delhi Laws Special Provisions Act, 2007 and challenges to the Master Plan 2021. He represented Maharashtra state in the public interest litigation petition filed in the fake stamp paper scam. He successfully defended the challenge to the reservation for OBCs in higher education. He appeared as amicus curiae in the MP Local Area Development Scheme and for Union of India/CBI in the matter relating to power of court to suo motu transfer investigation to the CBI without prior consent of the State government concerned. The International Cricket Council appointed him to hold an inquiry into the allegations of racism in Zimbabwe along with High Court Judge Steven Majied in September 2004. He was appointed Single Member Commission to inquire into allegations of racial abuse on South African cricketers during the South African tour of Australia in December 2005.

In 2012 his term as Attorney General of India was extended by two years.

In April 2013, Vahanvati's role in government came under scrutiny after allegations of impropriety and coercion emerged from his junior law officer, Harin P. Raval, who resigned from the post of Additional Solicitor General as a result.

In January 2014, Government of India, along with others, his name was forwarded in the category of "eminent jurist" to the Lokpal selection panel.

== Death ==
He died on 2 September 2014 in Mumbai due to cardiac arrest. On 11 September 2014, a full court reference, a commemorative event involving all judges of the court and lawyers, including the senior officer of the bar was held in the Chief Justice of India's court.
