= Ottavio Quattrocchi =

Italian businessman (1938–2013)

- Born: 1938; Mascali, Catania, Italy
- Died: 13 July 2013 (aged 74–75); Milan, Lombardy, Italy
- Occupation: Snamprogetti executive
- Known for: Key figure in the Bofors scandal (given reprieval before death)

Ottavio Quattrocchi (1938 – 13 July 2013) was an Italian businessman who was being sought until early 2009 in India for criminal charges for acting as a conduit for bribes in the Bofors scandal. Quattrocchi's role in this scandal, and his proximity to Indian prime minister Rajiv Gandhi through his wife Sonia Gandhi, is thought to have contributed to the defeat of the Congress Party in the 1989 elections. In 1999, the Central Bureau of Investigation (CBI) named Quattrocchi in a chargesheet as the conduit for the Bofors bribe. The case against him was strengthened in June 2003, when Interpol revealed two bank accounts, 5A5151516M and 5A5151516L, held by Quattrocchi and his wife Maria with the BSI AG bank, London, containing Euros 3 million and $1 million, a "curiously large savings for a salaried executive". In January 2006, these frozen bank accounts were unexpectedly released by India's law ministry, apparently without the consent of the CBI which had asked for them to be frozen.

On 6 February 2007, Quattrocchi was detained in Argentina on the basis of the Interpol warrant. The Indian investigating agency CBI came under attack for putting up a half-hearted effort towards his extradition and India lost the case for his extradition in June 2007, the judge remarking that "India did not even present proper legal documents". Consequently, India was asked to pay Quattrocchi's legal expenses.

Quattrocchi's financier son, Massimo Quattrocchi, grew up with Sonia Gandhi's children Rahul Gandhi and Priyanka Vadra. Massimo was reported to be advising the Luxembourg-based firm Clubinvest on business opportunities in India. He was also reported as visiting India frequently, and running an office in Bangalore. Quattrocchi was present in India at the time of his father's Argentina arrest in February 2007, and there is speculation that he may have met Priyanka Vadra around that time.

== Quattrocchi influence with Rajiv and Sonia Gandhi ==
Quattrocchi, born in Mascali, province of Catania, Sicily, in 1938, arrived in India in the mid 1960s as the representative of Italian oil and gas firm Eni and its engineering arm Snamprogetti. His family became close to the Gandhi family based on their connection with Rajiv Gandhi's Italian wife Sonia Gandhi, the former president of Indian National Congress party. The Special judge Prem Kumar observed in his order of 14 November 2002:

Around 1974, Quattrocchi was introduced to Shri Rajiv Gandhi and Sonia Gandhi by an Italian named Mr Molinari. Then Mrs and Mr Quattrocchi started visiting Rajiv Gandhi and Sonia Gandhi. Children of both sides were frequent visitors to each other. At that time Rajiv Gandhi was a pilot in Indian Airlines; Italian food and other gifts were also being exchanged between them. Quattrocchi thus became very close to Rajiv Gandhi and his wife.

Their children grew up together, and based on this friendship, Quattrocchi had become so influential at the office of the Prime Minister "that bureaucrats used to stand up when Quattrocchi visited them." Ashok Malik notes in The Pioneer:

From roughly 1980 to 1987 – Indira Gandhi's final years and Rajiv Gandhi's honeymoon years – Quattrocchi had the Midas touch. No deal was refused to him. "It was understood," remembers a Congressman from the original Mrs G's days, "that a fertiliser contract meant Snamprogetti. That was considered the favour to Sonia and Rajiv."

That his influence extended to ministers was noted by VP Singh, who initially pursued the Bofors scandal, and whose testimony is summarised in a court judgement:

V.P. Singh, Finance Minister in the Rajiv Gandhi Cabinet, has stated that Quattrocchi had sought appointment with him on a number of occasions but he did not give him any appointment. Rajiv Gandhi then asked him to meet Mr. Quattrocchi ... The link between the public servants, politicians and Quattrocchi looms large in these deals. The award of Jagdishpur Fertilizer Plant to Quattrocchi, changing earlier decision for SPIC, is a clear case.

He won about 60 projects for Snamprogetti, including:

- 1981: the five Alibag (Thal Vaishet) plants from RCF, four Kribhco plants in Hazira, as well as the ONGC gas pipeline in Hazira.
- 1983: National Fertilisers Limited's (NFL's) plant in Naya Nangal, Punjab and two plants in Guna.
- 1984: IFFCO's three plants in Aonla.
- 1987: Nagarjuna Fertilizers and Chemicals Limited's two plants in Kakinada.

In the process, it also became known that for contracts with India, Quattrocchi was the man to approach.

When orders did not go through, as in the Hazira-Bijapur-Jagdishpur (HBJ) pipeline (1985), where Spie Capag of France had "bid a few hundred crores lower." Vengeance was swift. Nawal Kishore Sharma lost his job as petroleum minister and was reduced to Congress general secretary. PK Kaul found his term as cabinet secretary ending prematurely and was sent to Washington, DC, as ambassador. The petroleum secretary, AS Gill, never made it to contention for cabinet secretary. The chairman of the Gas Authority of India, HS Cheema, was removed.

== The Bofors Scandal ==
In 1984, a tender was floated for Howitzer guns for the Indian Army. On evaluation, the French Sofma gun was found to be the best in terms of price and features. The Army needed a range of 30 km; Army chief Krishnaswamy Sundarji favoured the Sofma because in field trials showed its range as 29.2 km against 21.5 for Bofors. Furthermore, as was revealed much later, Bofors was (illegally) permitted to alter its bid without re-tendering. Eventually, despite the objections of the army and others, the order went to Bofors.

The Bofors scandal erupted after a 1987 report on Swedish radio, claiming that Bofors had paid bribes to secure the contract. A firm called AE Services was named – it was found to have a paid up capital of lira 100, and no employees Chitra Subramaniam and N. Ram of The Hindu obtained the private diary of Bofors MD Martin Ardbo, which revealed comments such as "Q's involvement may be a problem because of closeness to R.". The identity of "Q" became clearer when the investigation team identified the Swiss bank where the AE Services' money went to, and determined that it was operated by Ottavio Quattrocchi. Evidently, R meant Rajiv Gandhi. These were subsequently reinforced by the documents obtained by CBI from Switzerland, but these were eventually ruled out in court because they were photocopies, and not originals.

Once the scandal broke, the ruling Congress Party came under severe fire, eventually losing the elections in 1989. In July 1993, the Swiss courts had permitted naming the account operators, and Quattrocchi had been officially named. At this point, CBI attempted to question Quattrocchi, and permission was sought to impound his passport. However, just before Quattrocchi could be detained, on the night of 29–30 July 1993, Quattrocchi left Delhi for Kuala Lumpur. It was alleged that he had been let off as part of a deal between Sonia Gandhi and the-then prime minister PV Narasimha Rao.

In March 1999, Quattrocchi gave an interview claiming that never received any payment from Bofors, and that he did not have "any connection with A.E. Services". Around the same time, Sonia Gandhi spoke up for him in her first press conference

The CBI has found him suspect. But we have not seen till today the papers that he has done something.

On 22 October 1999, with the Bharatiya Janata Party (BJP)-led NDA government in power, the Central Bureau of Investigation (CBI) filed a chargesheet against Quattrocchi, naming AE Services as a front company run by Quattrocchi and his wife Maria. Based on 500 documents released by Swiss banks after protracted legal delays, the CBI framed charges against Quattrocchi and his wife, Maria; Win Chadha and his wife, Kanta. Among the conspirators named in the case were Rajiv Gandhi, and some other party functionaries. Chitra Subramaniam showed that Quattrocchi, through A.E. Services, had been paid 3% of the sale, about US$7 million, as commission.

Attempts to extradite Quattrocchi from Malaysia failed owing to lack of compelling evidence and in 2003 Quattrocchi returned to Italy. It has been reported that Indian requests for extradition or serving the Interpol warrant were turned down by Italy, who have requested to see the evidence and prosecute Quattrocchi in Italian courts.

On 5 February 2004 the Delhi High Court quashed the charges of bribery against Rajiv Gandhi and others, citing inadequate evidence that any of the commission was actually paid to them. Sonia Gandhi celebrated:

After 17 years of abuse and vilification, it's a special moment today for me and my children, Rahul and Priyanka.

However, the case was not dead; two charges – cheating, and causing wrongful loss to the Government, continue in the courts.

Meanwhile, Win Chadha also died.

On 31 May 2005, the High Court of Delhi dismissed the Bofors case allegations against the British business brothers, Shrichand, Gopichand, and Prakash Hinduja, a main point was the technical issue that the CBI had not certified the photocopies of the vital documents from the Swedish authorities it had submitted to the court.

=== De-freezing of accounts ===
In June 2003, a London branch of the Swiss bank BSI AG was found by the Interpol to have two accounts held by Quattrocchi and his wife Maria, containing Euros 3 million and $US1 million. These accounts were then frozen upon the request of the CBI. Several appeals by Quattrocchi to de-freeze these accounts were turned down by British courts, based on vigorous marshalling of evidence by the CBI.

However, on 22 December 2005, the Indian government position changed rather suddenly. The law minister Hansraj Bhardwaj deputed the additional solicitor general of India, B. Dutta, to London to specifically request release of these accounts. However, it appears that the law ministry never consulted the investigating agency, CBI in this matter.

According to an e-mail from the British authorities (cited in India Today),

Mr Datta conveyed his instructions on behalf of the Government of India, the Ministry of Justice and the Central Bureau of Investigation that no useful purpose will be served by maintaining the Restraining Order dated July 25, 2003, as there is no longer any reasonable prospect of the case against Mr Quattrocchi proceeding to trial.

On 16 January 2006, a Public Interest Litigation was filed in the Supreme Court, and the CBI was ordered to ensure that the money was not withdrawn until the reasons for the government decision were clarified. The CBI asserted in court that Quattrocchi was still wanted in charges related to Bofors. It has been alleged by a writ petition in the Supreme Court that B.B. Dutta may have acted under orders from the law minister Hans Raj Bhardwaj and that the CBI was most likely not consulted.

By the time of the Supreme Court decision, the amount of more than US$4 million, had been withdrawn from these two accounts.

The issue caused parliamentary criticism of the government action, and also weakened the position of Sonia Gandhi, coming as it did within a year of the coalition led by her coming to power in the 2004 Elections. The main case against Quattrocchi continues to trickle through the Indian court system.

=== Arrest in Argentina ===
On 6 February 2007, Quattrocchi was detained in Argentina on the basis of the Interpol warrant. The events unfolded as follows:

- Late January 2007: Ottavio Quattrocchi, despite having a warrant from Interpol in his name, takes an Alitalia flight from Italy to Buenos Aires, where he spends a few days, before proceeding to visit the Iguazu Falls. This area is a prominent tourist attraction, but is also a drug and terror alert region.
- 6 February 2007: At Iguazu, Quattrocchi goes over to nearby Brazil but is detained at Iguazu airport on his return on the basis of an Indian arrest warrant for "Falsification of Documents", later shown to be illegal by the Argentine court that tried Quattrocchi.
- 8 February: Interpol informs CBI about Quattrocchi's detention
- 13 February: The CBI responding to the Indian Supreme Court on a matter relating to money withdrawn by Quattrocchi, does not mention the fact of Quattrocchi's detention. CBI admits later that it had this information at the time. Agency director Vijai Shankar is facing contempt of court charges in the matter.
- 23 February: CBI releases a statement about Quattrocchi's arrest in Argentina:

It has been informed by the Argentine authorities through diplomatic channels that Italian national Ottavio Quattrocchi, an accused in CBI Case RC.1(A)/90-ACU.IV/SIG (Bofors Case) and subject of Interpol Red Corner Notice # A-44/2/1997, has been detained and taken in preventive custody on 6 February 2007. Quattrocchi was detained at Iguazu International Airport in Argentina province of Misiones while in transit to Buenos Aires.

- 24 February: The opposition party Bharatiya Janata Party (BJP) claims that this late release of information was orchestrated by the Congress government to avoid embarrassment to Sonia Gandhi during the ongoing state elections in Punjab and Uttarakhand.
- 26 February: Quattrocchi released on bail. It appears that the CBI/India was not represented in the matter. On the other hand, the Italian government supported Quattrocchi, with the Consul General of Italy being himself present in court.
- 2 March: The CBI sends a team to fight the extradition case coming up for which papers need to be filed by 7 March. An English speaking lawyer is appointed by CBI.
- 9 June: The request for the extradition of Ottavio Quattrocchi is rejected by the court of El Dorado, Argentina on three counts: 1) The 1997 arrest warrant which specified as a motivation, "falsification of documents" was deemed to be illegal and based on an unsubstantiated accusation, 2) The 1997 arrest warrant had in any case been "used" by the prior arrest of Quattrocchi in Malaysia, 3)Arrest warrant and court order issued after the arrest of Quattrocchi, on 23 February 2007 was deemed to be arbitrary. The detailed judgment commented that "the CBI's request was not backed by ample judicial documents". In a final blow to the CBI, the investigative agency was also to pay the legal fees of Quattrocchi.

=== Allegations re: Massimo Quattrocchi ===
At the time of the Argentine arrest, Massimo Quattrocchi had purportedly been in India for seven months. He had arrived in New Delhi on 21 July 2006, on Lufthansa flight 760, and left by Lufthansa flight 761 on 22 February.

There was a sixteen-day delay between when the CBI was informed about Quattrocchi's arrest in Argentina (7 February) and when the information was made public (23 February, the day after Massimo's departure). This together with the failure by CBI to explain their reasons for the delay has led to speculations on a possible Massimo role.

The CBI director, Vijai Shankar explained the delay saying that it took time to translate the documents from Spanish, but this explanation appeared lame, and it turned out to be false since the intimation was sent by the Indian Embassy in English. This delay, similar to the delay in informing the public about the de-freezing of the accounts, remained unanswered, leading to considerable speculation.

On 17 February, Massimo was allegedly seen at a party thrown where Priyanka Vadra was also present. Any meeting between Priyanka and Massimo was vigorously denied by Congress general secretary Digvijay Singh, but when interviewer Karan Thapar asked him how he knew, he simply repeated the denial. Subsequently, however, it was reported that the agencies were investigating his presence at the party, at the instance of Rahul Gandhi.

The presence of Massimo in this crucial period has led to charges by the opposition parties that Massimo, who grew up with Priyanka and Rahul Gandhi, may have influenced the highest levels of the Indian government resulting in the inept CBI legal process that lost the case in Argentina. However, the Congress spokesman blamed the loss in Argentina to earlier NDA government incompetence: "we lost to three courts in Malaysia".

=== Damage to the Congress Party ===
Quattocchi having been named as the main beneficiary in the payoff continues to hurt Sonia Gandhi. The position of the Law Minister Hansraj Bharadwaj has been compromised, and the integrity of Prime Minister Manmohan Singh, has also been brought into question.

== Interpol removes the red corner notice ==
In April 2009, The Interpol removed the red-corner notice issued against Ottavio Quattrocchi after a request from the Central Bureau of Investigation.

In sharp contrast to a nearly two-decade-long investigation by the CBI, an income tax tribunal bench has ruled that Rs. 410 million was paid in bribes to Quattrocchi and Win Chadha, the Bofors agent in India.

A major chapter in the 25-year-old Bofors saga was closed on 4 March 2011 with a Tis Hazari court discharging Quattrocchi from the payoffs case after allowing the CBI to withdraw prosecution against him.

Chief Metropolitan Magistrate Vinod Yadav, in his 73-page order, noted that the CBI, despite "spending through the nose for about 21 years, has not been able to put forward legally sustainable evidence with regard to conspiracy in the matter. Further, in the case of Mr Quattrocchi, as against the alleged kickback of Rs. 640 million he received, the CBI had by 2005 already spent around Rs. 2.50 billion on the investigation, which is sheer wastage of public money."

== Death ==
Ottavio Quattrocchi died from a heart attack on 13 July 2013 in Milan, Italy.
