= Bofors scandal =

1980s–90s Indian–Swedish corruption scandal related to defence equipment sales

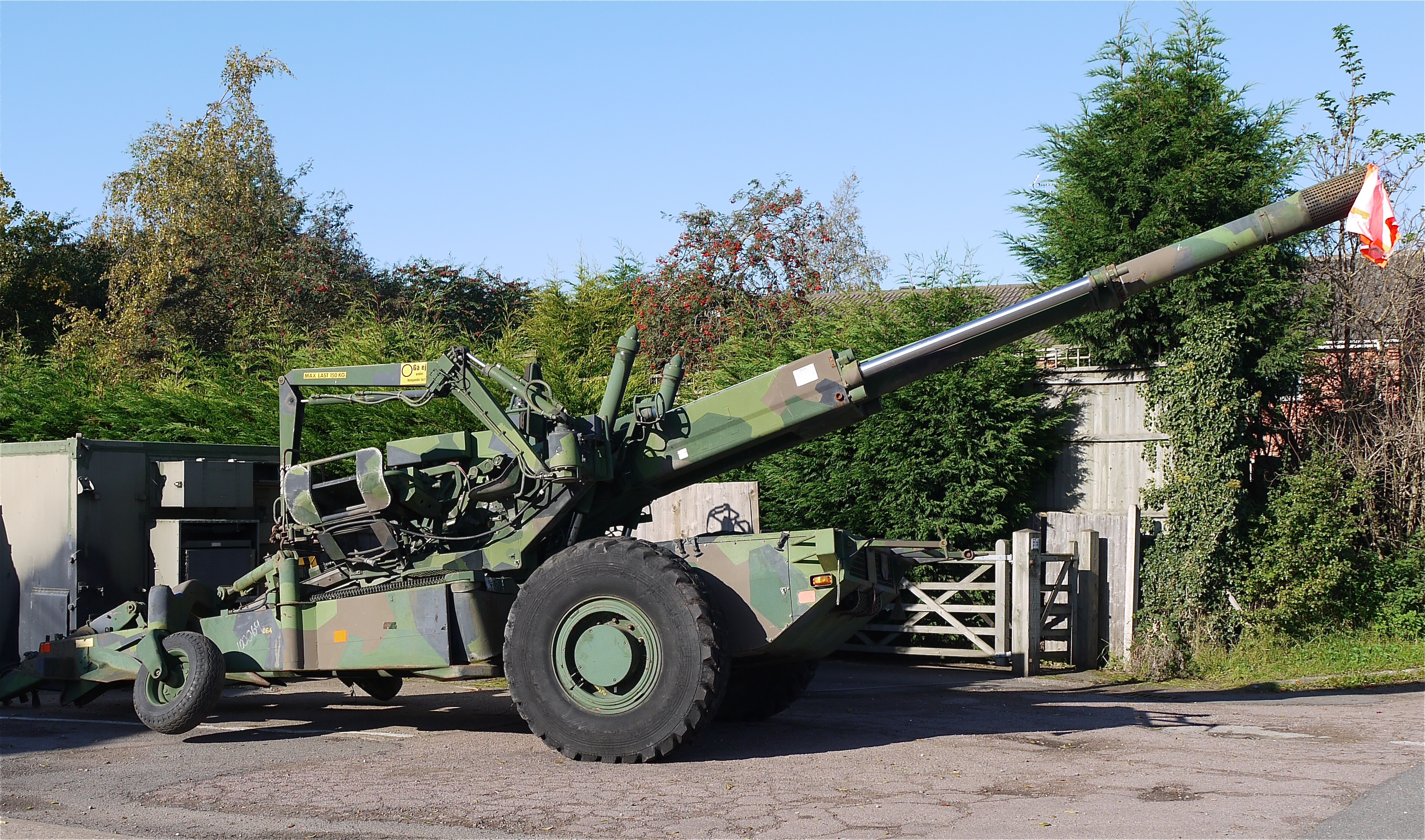
Haubits FH77 howitzer, of the type around which the Bofors scandal centered.

The Bofors scandal was a major weapons-contract political scandal that occurred between India and Sweden during the 1980s and 1990s, initiated by Indian National Congress politicians and implicating the Indian prime minister, Rajiv Gandhi, and several other members of the Indian and Swedish governments. These politicians were accused of receiving kickbacks from Bofors AB, an arms manufacturer principally financed by the Wallenberg family's Skandinaviska Enskilda Banken, for winning a bid to supply to India the company's 155 mm field howitzer – the sale of 410 field howitzers, and a supply contract for almost twice that amount, totalling a US$1.4 billion deal. It was the biggest arms deal ever in Sweden, and money marked for development projects was diverted to secure this contract at any cost. The investigations revealed flouting of rules and bypassing of institutions.

On 16 April 1987, a Swedish radio station broke a story, sourced from a whistleblower in the Swedish police, alleging that the reputed Swedish artillery manufacturer Bofors had paid kickbacks to people in several countries, including Sweden and India, to secure a ₹15 billion (equivalent to ₹220 billion or US$2.3 billion in 2026) contract. This had been done the previous year for a deal to supply 410 155 mm calibre howitzers for the Indian army. However, none of the newspapers in India were aware of this. In May 1987, a broadcast by a Swedish radio station revealed that bribes of ₹600 million (equivalent to ₹8.9 billion or US$93 million in 2026) had been paid by Bofors to Indian politicians, members of the Congress party and bureaucrats. This was picked up by a young journalist from The Hindu, Chitra Subramaniam, who happened to be in Sweden at that time, covering another story. The scale of the corruption was far worse than any that Sweden and India had seen before and directly led to the defeat of Gandhi's ruling Indian National Congress party in the November 1989 general elections. The Swedish company paid ₹640 million (US$6.6 million) in kickbacks to top Indian politicians and key defence officials.

The case came to light during Vishwanath Pratap Singh's tenure as defence minister, and was revealed through investigative journalism tipped off by a Reuters news revelation on Swedish radio, followed up by a team led by N. Ram of the newspaper The Hindu. Subramaniam, reporting for The Hindu, secured the over 350 documents that detailed the payoffs. Later the articles were published in The Indian Express and The Statesman when The Hindu stopped publishing stories about the Bofors scandal under immense government pressure and Subramaniam moved to the two newspapers. In an interview with her, published in The Hoot in April 2012 on the 25th anniversary of the revelations, Sten Lindström, former chief of Swedish police, discussed why he had leaked the documents to her and the role of whistle-blowers in a democracy.

== Chronology of events and investigation ==
1977 - As a response to reports that Pakistan wants to acquire brand new American long-range 155-mm M198 howitzers (which was withheld due to US political concerns), India requested Bofors and six other manufacturers to suggest their towed howitzers.

Early 1981 - four howitzers were shortlisted to participate in the field trials: FH-77B, FH-70, GHN-45 and GIAT-155 TR.

1985 - FH-70 and GHN-45 were eliminated from the trials.

24 March 1986 - A $285 million contract between the Government of India and Swedish arms company Bofors was signed for supply of 410 155 mm Howitzer field guns.

16 April 1987 - Swedish Radio alleged that Bofors paid kickbacks to people from a number of countries including top Swedish and Indian politicians and key defence officials to seal the deal.

1987 - As a result of the revelations, the Indian government blacklisted Bofors, preventing the company from doing business in India. The middleman associated with the scandal was Ottavio Quattrocchi, an Italian businessman who represented the petrochemicals firm Snamprogetti. Quattrocchi was reportedly close to the family of Rajiv Gandhi and emerged as a powerful broker in the 1980s between big businesses and the Indian government.

21 May 1991 - While the case was being investigated, Rajiv Gandhi was assassinated for unrelated reasons by the LTTE.

1997 - The Swiss banks released some 500 documents after years of legal battle.

1999 - The Indian government lifted its ban on Bofors. The lifting of the ban came during the Kargil War, when the Bofors guns proved to be efficient but were crippled by a shortage of spare parts.

22 October 1999 - When National Democratic Alliance government led by the Bharatiya Janata Party was in power, the Central Bureau of Investigation (CBI) filed the first chargesheet against Quattrocchi, Win Chadha, Rajiv Gandhi, the defence secretary S. K. Bhatnagar and a number of others.

2001 - Win Chadha and S. K. Bhatnagar died.

10 June 2002 - Delhi High Court quashed all proceedings in the case so far. However, this was reversed by Supreme Court of India on 7 July 2003.

2004 - The central government changed and Indian National Congress came to power after 2004 Lok Sabha elections. On 5 February 2004, the Delhi High Court quashed the charges of bribery against Rajiv Gandhi and others.

31 May 2005 - The Delhi High Court dismissed the allegations against the British business brothers, Srichand, Gopichand and Prakash Hinduja, but charges against others remained.

December 2005 - B. Daat, the Additional Solicitor General of India, acting on behalf of the Indian Government and the CBI, requested the British Government that two British bank accounts of Quattrocchi be unfrozen on the grounds of insufficient evidence to link these accounts to the Bofors payoff. The two accounts, containing €3 million and $1 million, had been frozen. On 16 January, the Indian Supreme Court directed the Indian government to ensure that Quattrocchi did not withdraw money from the two bank accounts in London. The CBI, the Indian federal law enforcement agency, on 23 January 2006 admitted that roughly ₹210 million, about US$4.6 million, in the two accounts have already been withdrawn by the accused. The British government released the funds later.

16 January 2006 - CBI claimed in an affidavit filed before the Supreme Court that they were still pursuing extradition orders for Quattrocchi. The Interpol, at the request of the CBI, has a long-standing red corner notice to arrest Quattrocchi.

6 February 2007 - Quattrocchi was detained in Argentina on 6 February 2007, but the news of his detention was released by the CBI only on 23 February. Quattrocchi was released by Argentinian police. However, his passport was impounded and he was not allowed to leave the country. As there was no extradition treaty between India and Argentina, the case was presented in the Argentine Supreme Court. The government of India lost the extradition case as the government of India did not provide a key court order which was the basis of Quattrocchi's arrest. In the aftermath, the government did not appeal this decision because of delays in securing an official English translation of the court's decision.

4 March 2011 - A Delhi court provided temporary relief to Quattrocchi from the case, for lack of sufficient evidence against him.

12 July 2013 - Quattrochi died of heart attack in Milan.

Despite the controversy, the Bofors gun was used extensively as the primary field artillery during the Kargil War with Pakistan and gave India 'an edge' against Pakistan according to battlefield commanders.

In his book, Unknown Facets of Rajiv Gandhi, Jyoti Basu and Indrajit Gupta, released in November 2013, former CBI director A P Mukherjee wrote that Rajiv Gandhi wanted commission paid by defence suppliers to be used exclusively for the purpose of meeting expenses of running the Congress party. Mukherjee said Gandhi explained his position in a meeting on 19 June 1989, during a meeting between the two at the Prime Minister's residence. However, as per Sten Lindstrom, the former head of Swedish police, who led the investigations, they did not find anything to suggest that payments had been received by Rajiv Gandhi. He was, however, guilty of knowing about the kickbacks and not taking action on them.

== Political effects ==
The Bofors scandal was a major issue that was highlighted in subsequent elections, which led to the Congress losing power. Though it was widely believed that V. P. Singh resigned from Rajiv Gandhi's cabinet due to the Bofors scandal, Singh clarified that he had resigned due to differences in the cabinet in commissions taken by Indian agents in the HDW submarine deal (Shishumar class).

== Middlemen in Indian arms deals ==
Middlemen were employed in arms deals in India, both under the British Raj as well as in independent India, and commissions were paid to them under various headings and guises. Some of these were paid as personal bribes while others were paid as contributions to political parties. This led to high levels of corruption, and payments being made to politicians, bureaucrats and defence personnel to influence decisions. The political controversies caused by the Bofors Scandal, led to the banning of middlemen in arms deals.

In 2015, the Government of India under the Narendra Modi government made the use of middlemen in arms deals legal, if they called themselves "company representatives". The then defence minister Manohar Parrikar announced that in such cases, middlemen would be paid by the government for fixing arms deals under the name of "legal fees".

== Allegations against CBI ==
A former cabinet minister of the Bharatiya Janata Party, Arun Jaitley, criticised the manner in which CBI has handled this case, including:

- Delay in lodging an FIR
- Delay in sending letter rogatories
- Not appealing against the judgement of the Delhi High Court in 2004
- De-freezing of Quattrocchi's bank account in London by saying to the Crown Prosecutor that there is no case against Quattrocchi
- Putting up a very weak case for Quattrocchi's extradition from Argentina. Subsequently, no appeal against lower court's verdict
- The withdrawal of the Interpol Red Corner notice
- Finally, withdrawal of its case against Quattrocchi. Reacting to this, Chief Metropolitan Magistrate Vinod Yadav said that, "I agree that there are certain malafide intentions in the case and there is no doubt in that"

== Closure ==
The closure of Bofors case was full of twists and turns. In 2004, Delhi High Court posthumously gave clean chit to Rajiv Gandhi and said that there was no case of corruption against him or any public servant. This judgement stunned CBI as it had pursued the case for 14 years and was a setback to NDA government headed by Atal Bihari Vajpayee as well. However, CBI said that it would contest the judgement in Supreme Court.

In 2011, a Delhi court allowed CBI to close the case. Thereafter in 2012, Swedish police chief Sten Lindstrom, who led the investigations and identified himself as the whistleblower, said that Rajiv Gandhi had done nothing wrong and also cleared Bollywood actor Amitabh Bachchan and his family from any involvement in the scandal. Instead, he accused Swedish government of diverting funds marked for development projects to secure the deal by flouting the rules and bypassing the institutions. On 6 Aug 2026, the supreme court dismissed the final plea challenging the relief granted to the Hinduja brothers and AB Bofors, effectively bringing the case to a close.

== See also ==
- H. R. Bhardwaj
- Justice Ajit Bharihoke, the special CBI court judge in whose court the case was argued.
- Corruption in India
- 1992 Indian stock market scam
- NSE co-location scam
- Corruption Perceptions Index
- List of scandals in India
- Jan Lokpal Bill
- Jeep scandal case 1948
- Indian made K9 Vajra Howitzer Experiences Technical Issues
