= L. N. Sinha =

Attorney General of India from 1979 to 1983

Lal Narayan Sinha was a lawyer who served as the Attorney General of India between 9 August 1979 and 8 August 1983, and as the Solicitor General of India from 17 July 1972 until 5 April 1977. He was educated at Patna Law College, Patna University.

Sinha was the first Attorney General to represent a private party during their term in office. Before becoming the Solicitor General of India, he was the Advocate General of Bihar for several years.

== Family and early life ==
His son Lalit Mohan Sharma became the Chief Justice of India. His grandson Justice Partha Sarthy currently serves as a Judge in the Patna High Court.
