= Ranjit Kumar =

Indian lawyer

Ranjit Kumar is a senior advocate practising in Supreme Court of India and the former Solicitor General of India. He was appointed in 2014 by the incumbent government of Narendra Modi, succeeding Mohan Parasaran. The notification for his appointment as Solicitor General of India was issued by the Law Ministry on 7 June 2014. Ranjit Kumar resigned from his post on 20 October 2017 citing a personal family-related reason.

In 2012, Kumar and two other senior advocates were threatened with expulsion from the Supreme Court Bar Association.
