= Attorney General of India =

Indian government's chief legal officer

Attorney General for India
- Emblem of The Government of India

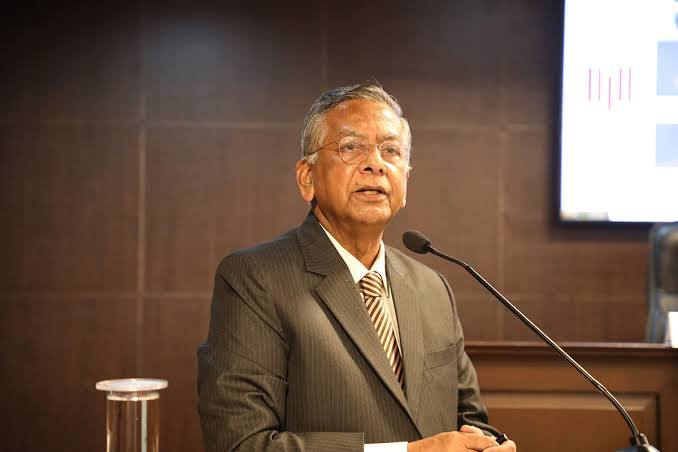
- Incumbent; R. Venkataramani
- Type: Judiciary of India
- Abbreviation: AGI
- Residence: New Delhi, India
- Appointer: President of India; on advice of the Union Cabinet
- Term length: per discretion of the President
- Constituting instrument: Article 76 of the Constitution
- Formation: 28 January 1950
- First holder: M. C. Setalvad
- Deputy: Solicitor General of India
- Salary: ₹225,000 (US$2,300) (per month); ₹2,700,000 (US$28,000) (Annual)

The Attorney General for India (AG of India) is the chief legal advisor of the Government of India. The Attorney General is appointed by the President of India at the instance of the Union Cabinet under Article 76(1) of the Constitution and hold office during the pleasure of the President. The Attorney General must meet the qualifications necessary for an appointment as a Judge of the Supreme Court. Therefore, the Attorney General should have served as a judge in a high court for a minimum of five years, or as an advocate in a high court for at least ten years. Alternatively, the President may consider an individual as eligible for the role if they are deemed an eminent jurist.

R. Venkataramani is the incumbent Attorney General for India. He succeeded to the office as the 16th Attorney General on 1 October 2022. His predecessor was K. K. Venugopal.

== Powers, duties and functions ==
The Attorney General is necessary for advising the Government of India on legal matters referred to them. The Attorney General also performs other legal duties assigned to by the President. Article 76 and 88 of the Constitution confer on the Attorney General the right of audience in all Courts in India as well as the right to participate in the proceedings of the Parliament, though not the right to vote. The Attorney General appears on behalf of Government of India in all cases (including suits, appeals and other proceedings) in the Supreme Court in which Government of India is concerned. The Attorney General also represents the Government of India in any reference made by the President to the Supreme Court under Article 143 of the Constitution.

Unlike the Attorney General of the United States, the Attorney General of India has no executive authority. Those functions are performed by the Law Minister of India. Also the Attorney General is not a government servant and is not debarred from private legal practice.

The Attorney General is permitted to receive briefs; however, they are precluded from advocating against the government. Moreover, the Attorney General is restricted from representing an accused party in criminal proceedings and assuming a directorial role in a company without the explicit consent of the Government.

The Attorney General is assisted by the Solicitor General and Additional Solicitors General. The Attorney General is to be consulted only in legal matters of real importance and only after the Ministry of Law has been consulted. All references to the Attorney General are made by the Law Ministry.

== Fee and allowances payable ==
Fee and allowances payable to the law officers (including Attorney General of India, Solicitor General of India and the Additional Solicitors General) of the Government of India are as under:

S.No.	Nomenclature of the item of work	Rates of fees payable for appearance and other work.
(1)	Suits, writ petitions, appeals and references under article 143	₹16,000/- per case per day
(2)	Special leave petitions and other applications	₹5,000/- per case per day
(3)	Settling pleadings (including affidavits)	₹5,000/- per pleading
(4)	Settling Statement of Case	₹6,000/- per case
(5)	For giving opinions in statements of cases sent by the Ministry of Law	₹10,000/- per case
(6)	For written submission before the Supreme Court, High Court, and Commissions of Inquiry or Tribunals and the like	₹10,000/- per case
(7)	Appearance in Courts outside Delhi	₹40,000/- per day per case

In addition to the above fee payable for cases, a retainer fee is paid to the Attorney General of India, Solicitor General of India and the Additional Solicitors General at the rate of ₹50,000, ₹40,000 and ₹30,000 per month, respectively. Moreover, the attorney general of India is also paid a sumptuary allowance of Rs. 4,000 per month, except during the period of his leave.

== Politicisation of the Attorney General ==
It has evolved into a customary practice for the Attorney General to submit their resignation upon the inception of a new government. As the appointee of the government, the Attorney General serves as its advocate, implying a lack of complete neutrality. Nevertheless, holding a constitutional mandate, the Attorney General's viewpoints are subject to public scrutiny. Nonetheless, instances have arisen where the Attorney General's positions appear to have been notably influenced by political considerations.

During some of the AG tenures, it has been felt that the Attorney General has gone too far. Niren De during Indira Gandhi replied to a question by Hans Raj Khanna stating that even the right to life can be suspended during emergency.

Similarly, in 2005, when the UPA government was planning a possible coalition with Mayawati, Milon K. Banerjee's opinion absolving Mayawati in the Taj corridor case was ignored by the Supreme Court. In a direct condemnation of the government which asked the CBI to heed Attorney General Milon Banerjee's opinion and close the case against Mayawati, the Supreme Court told the agency not to go solely on the AG's opinion and place all evidence before it.

In 2009, Milon K. Banerjee's opinion absolving Ottavio Quattrocchi in the Bofors scandal has also been viewed as "devaluing and eroding the Attorney General's position".

During the UPA-II government (2009–2014), the conduct of Attorney General Goolam Vahanvati was criticised in a number of cases. In 2G spectrum case, he became the first Attorney General in India's history who had to testify as a witness in a corruption case in a trial court. In late April 2013, in coal-gate scandal, Vahanvati was accused of misrepresenting facts in the top-most court of India. Again in the same case, Vahanvati's role came under scrutiny after allegations of impropriety and coercion emerged from his junior law officer, Harin P. Raval, who resigned from the post of Additional Solicitor General as a result.

== List of Attorneys General of India ==
The attorneys general of India since independence are listed below:

List of Attorneys General of India
#	Attorney General	Term start	Term end	Term length	Prime Minister
1	Motilal Chimanlal Setalvad	28 January 1950	1 March 1963	13 years, 32 days	Jawaharlal Nehru
2	Chander Kishan Daphtary	2 March 1963	30 October 1968	5 years, 242 days	Jawaharlal Nehru
2	Chander Kishan Daphtary	2 March 1963	30 October 1968	5 years, 242 days	Lal Bahadur Shastri
3	Niren De	1 November 1968	31 March 1977	8 years, 150 days	Indira Gandhi
4	S. V. Gupta	1 April 1977	8 August 1979	2 years, 129 days	Morarji Desai
5	Lal Narayan Sinha	9 August 1979	8 August 1983	3 years, 364 days	Charan Singh
5	Lal Narayan Sinha	9 August 1979	8 August 1983	3 years, 364 days	Indira Gandhi
6	Keshava Parasaran	9 August 1983	8 December 1989	6 years, 121 days	Indira Gandhi
6	Keshava Parasaran	9 August 1983	8 December 1989	6 years, 121 days	Rajiv Gandhi
7	Soli Jehangir Sorabjee	9 December 1989	2 December 1990	358 days	V. P. Singh
7	Soli Jehangir Sorabjee	9 December 1989	2 December 1990	358 days	Chandra Shekhar
8	G. Ramesh	3 December 1990	23 November 1992	1 year, 356 days	Chandra Shekhar
8	G. Ramesh	3 December 1990	23 November 1992	1 year, 356 days	P. V. Narasimha Rao
9	Milon Kumar Banerji	24 November 1992	8 July 1996	3 years, 227 days	P. V. Narasimha Rao
10	Ashok Desai	9 July 1996	6 April 1998	1 year, 272 days	H. D. Deve Gowda
10	Ashok Desai	9 July 1996	6 April 1998	1 year, 272 days	Inder Kumar Gujral
(7)	Soli Jehangir Sorabjee	7 April 1998	4 June 2004	6 years, 58 days	Atal Bihari Vajpayee
(9)	Milon Kumar Banerji	5 June 2004	7 June 2009	5 years, 3 days	Manmohan Singh
11	Goolam Essaji Vahanvati	8 June 2009	11 June 2014	5 years, 3 days	Manmohan Singh
12	Mukul Rohatgi	19 June 2014	18 June 2017	2 years, 364 days	Narendra Modi
13	Kotayan Katankot Venugopal	1 July 2017	30 September 2022	5 years, 91 days	Narendra Modi
14	R. Venkataramani	1 October 2022	Incumbent		Narendra Modi

== See also ==
- Advocate general (India), state-level equivalent
- Solicitor General of India
- Additional Solicitor General of India
- Law Officers of India
