= Lala Hansraj Gupta =

Indian educationist, social worker and philanthropist

- Died: July 3, 1985
- Spouse: Angira Devi
- Children: Desraj Gupta, Shivraj Gupta, Rajendra Gupta, Mahendra Gupta, Sasi Gupta, Pratibha Gupta

Lala Hansraj Gupta was an Indian educationist, social worker and philanthropist. He was awarded Padma Vibhushan by Government of India for his services to society.

He served as seventh Mayor of Delhi. Gupta was a founding member of the Child Education Society in 1944. Bal Bharati Public School is one of the private institutions owned by the Child Education Society.

He died on 3 July 1985. He was an educationist and one of the founders of RSS , his son Rajendra gupta served as mayor and deputy CM in sahib Singh vermas government He was arrested during the emergency
