= Raja Lakhamgouda Law College =

- Established: 1939; 87 years ago
- Founders: Karnataka Law Society
- Affiliation: Karnataka State Law University
- Principal: Dr. A. H. Hawaldar
- Location: Belgaum, Karnataka, India
- Website: rllc.klsbelagavi.org

Raja Lakhamgouda Law College is an institution for legal education situated in Belgaum, Karnataka, India. It was established in 1939 by the Karnataka Law Society, and is one of the oldest Indian Law Colleges. The college is named after Raja Lakhamgouda Sirdesai, the head of the former princely state of Vantamuri who has served as a mentor and donor to the school.

== About the institute ==
The college has a classrooms, computer labs, playground, gymnasium, library building, canteen, and boys and girls hostels with medical facilities.

The college library has a collection of books and journals for learning and research. The college subscribes to several journals, newspapers and periodicals relating to the profession of law, general knowledge and general reading. A large part of library work has been computerized. There is a digital library available where students have access to all books, reports of Law Commissions and Bare Acts. It has services of the internet, Wi-Fi and CCTV. The college has started the 5 year law courses (B. A., LL. B. and B. B. A., LL. B.), incorporating the recent socio-legal aspects in the curriculum. The students have won several championships in sports, debate, and elocution. They participate in several national and international level Moot Court competitions.

It has conducted seminars on Right to Information, Judicial activism, Gender Justice, Protection of Women against Domestic Violence.

== Location ==
The college is situated on a large campus, in Tilakwadi, a suburb of Belgaum.

== Affiliation and recognition ==
R. L. Law College was initially affiliated to Bombay University, and after the establishment of Karnataka University it is now affiliated to the Karnataka State Law University, Hubli. The college is recognised by the Bar Council of India as well as by the Government of Karnataka.
