= Niren De =

Indian Attorney General

Attorney General for India
- In office 1 November 1968 – 31 March 1977
- Preceded by: C. K. Daphtary
- Succeeded by: S. V. Gupte

Solicitor General of India
- In office 30 September 1967 – 30 October 1968
- Preceded by: S. V. Gupte
- Succeeded by: Jagadish Swarup

Personal details
- Born: 17 August 1908 Calcutta, British India
- Died: 1978
- Awards: Padma Vibhushan (1974)

Niren De was an Indian Lawyer and was the Attorney General for India from November 1968 to March 1977 and it covered Indian Emergency. He was earlier the Solicitor General of India. He was awarded the Padma Vibhushan in 1974. He was also the Chairman of the Bar council of India.

As the Attorney General for India during Emergency, when questioned by the Supreme Court of India about the remedies available if an innocent man was to be shot dead by the Police, he is reported to have said, “Your Lordships, as long as there is Emergency, there is no remedy…that is the law…”
