= Solicitor General of India =

Indian law officer

- Incumbent; Tushar Mehta since 11 October 2018
- Abbreviation: SGI
- Reports to: Attorney General of India
- Appointer: ACC
- Term length: 3 years (per discretion of ACC)
- Formation: 28 January 1950
- First holder: C. K. Daphtary
- Deputy: Addl. Solicitor General

The Solicitor General of India (SGI) is subordinate to the Attorney General for India. The SGI is the second-highest law officer of the country, assists the Attorney General, and is assisted by Additional Solicitors General of India (Addl. SGIs). The SGI and the Addl. SGIs advise the Union of India and appear on its behalf in terms of the Law Officers (Conditions of Service) Rules, 1987.

Unlike the post of Attorney General for India, which is a Constitutional post under Article 76 of the Indian Constitution, the posts of the Solicitor General and the Additional Solicitor General are neither Constitutional nor statutory. The conditions of service of Law Officers are defined by The Law Officers (Conditions of Service) Rules, 1987, made under the powers conferred by the proviso to Article 309 of the Indian Constitution.

The Appointments Committee of the Cabinet (ACC) recommends the appointment and officially appoints the Solicitor General. The proposal for appointment of Solicitor General, Additional Solicitor General is generally moved at the level of Joint secretary (or Law Secretary) in the Department of Legal Affairs and after obtaining the approval of the Minister of Law & Justice, the proposal goes to the ACC and then to the president.

Currently, the Solicitor General of India is Tushar Mehta who has been serving on this post since 10 October 2018.

== Duties ==
The Solicitor General works under the Attorney General of India. The duties of the Solicitor General are laid out in Law Officers (Conditions of Service) Rules, 1987:

- to give advice to the Government of India upon such legal matters, and to perform such other duties of a legal character, as may from time to time, be referred or assigned to him by the Government of India.
- to appear, whenever required, in the Supreme Court or in any High Court on behalf of the Government of India in cases (including suits, writ petitions, appeal and other proceedings) in which the Government of India is concerned as a party or is otherwise interested;
- to represent the Government of India in any reference made by the President to the Supreme Court under Article 143 of the Constitution; and
- to discharge such other functions as are conferred on a Law Officer by or under the Constitution or any other Law for the time being in force.

== Restrictions of private practice ==
As law officers representing the Government of India, SGIs are bound by certain restrictions concerning private practice. A law officer is not allowed to:

- hold briefs in any court for any party, except the Government of India or the government of a State or any University, Government School or College, local authority, Public Service Commission, Port Trust, Port Commissioners, Government aided or Government managed hospitals, a Government company, any Corporation owned or controlled by the State, any body or institution in which the Government has a preponderating interest;
- advice any party against the Government of India or a Public Sector Undertaking, or in cases in which he is likely to be called upon to advise, or appear for, the Government of India or a Public Sector Undertaking;
- defend an accused person in a criminal prosecution, without the permission of the Government of India; or
- accept appointment to any office in any company or corporation without the permission of the Government of India;
- advise any Ministry or Department of Government of India or any statutory organisation or any Public Sector Undertaking unless the proposal or a reference in this regard is received through the Ministry of Law and Justice, Department of Legal Affairs.

== Fee and allowances payable ==
Fee and allowances payable to the law officers (including Attorney General of India, Solicitor General of India and the Additional Solicitors General) of the Government of India are as under:

S.No.	Nomenclature of the item of work	Rates of fees payable for appearance and other work
(1)	Suits, writ petitions, appeals and references under article 143	Rs. 16,000/- per case per day
(2)	Special leave petitions and other applications	Rs. 10,000/- per case per day
(3)	Settling pleadings (including affidavits)	Rs. 5,000/- per pleading
(4)	Settling Statement of Case	Rs. 6,000/- per case
(5)	For giving opinions in statements of cases sent by the Ministry of Law	Rs. 10,000/- per case
(6)	For written submission before the Supreme Court, High Court, and Commissions of Inquiry or Tribunals and the like	Rs. 10,000/- per case
(7)	Appearance in Courts outside Delhi	Rs. 40,000/- per day per case

In addition to the above fee payable for cases, a retainer fee is paid to the Solicitor General and the Addl. Solicitors General at the rate of Rs. 40,000, and Rs. 30,000 per month, respectively.

== List of incumbent Law Officers ==
The list of incumbent Law Officers (i.e. AGI, SGI, Addl. SGIs) as of 10 September 2024 are as follows:

List of Law Officers
Attorney General of India		Appointment	Term length
R. Venkataramani		1 October 2022	3 years, 364 days
Solicitor General of India		Appointment	Term length
Tushar Mehta		10 October 2018	7 years, 355 days
Additional Solicitor General of India		Appointment	Term length
Vikramjit Banerjee	Supreme Court	5 March 2018	8 years, 209 days
K.M. Nataraj	Supreme Court	14 January 2019	7 years, 259 days
Suryaprakash V. Raju	Supreme Court	30 June 2020	6 years, 92 days
N. Venkataraman	Supreme Court	30 June 2020	6 years, 92 days
Aishwarya Bhati	Supreme Court	30 June 2020	6 years, 92 days
S. Dwarkanath	Supreme Court	10 September 2024	2 years, 20 days
Archana Pathak Dave	Supreme Court	10 September 2024	2 years, 20 days
Satya Darshi Sanjay	Supreme Court	10 September 2024	2 years, 20 days
Brijender Chahar	Supreme Court	10 September 2024	2 years, 20 days
Rajkumar Bhaskar Thakare	Supreme Court	10 September 2024	2 years, 20 days
Raghavendra P Shankar	Supreme Court	10 September 2024	2 years, 20 days
Rajdeepak Rastogi	Rajasthan HC	28 July 2014	12 years, 64 days
Satya Pal Jain	Punjab & Haryana HC	8 April 2015	11 years, 175 days
Anil Chandrabali Singh	Bombay HC	9 July 2017	9 years, 83 days
Shashi Prakash Singh	Allahabad HC	9 February 2018	8 years, 233 days
K. Arvind Kamath	Karnataka HC	17 October 2023	2 years, 348 days
T. Surya Karan Reddy	Southern Zone	18 December 2019	6 years, 286 days
R. Sankaranaryanan	Madras HC	30 June 2020	6 years, 92 days
Ashok Kumar Chakraborty	Calcutta HC	9 July 2022	4 years, 83 days
Devang Girish Vyas	Gujarat HC	30 June 2020	6 years, 92 days
Chetan Sharma	Delhi HC	1 July 2020	6 years, 91 days
Dr. Krishna Nandan Singh	Patna HC	1 July 2020	6 years, 91 days

== List of Solicitors General of India ==
The Solicitors General of India since independence are listed below:

List of Solicitors General of India
#	Solicitor General	Term start	Term end	Term length	Prime Ministers
1	Chander Kishan Daphtary	28 January 1950	1 March 1963	13 years, 32 days	Jawaharlal Nehru
2	H. N. Sanyal	2 March 1963	9 September 1964	1 year, 191 days	Jawaharlal Nehru
2	H. N. Sanyal	2 March 1963	9 September 1964	1 year, 191 days	Lal Bahadur Shastri
3	S. V. Gupta	10 September 1964	16 September 1967	3 years, 6 days	Lal Bahadur Shastri
3	S. V. Gupta	10 September 1964	16 September 1967	3 years, 6 days	Indira Gandhi
4	Niren De	30 September 1967	30 October 1968	1 year, 30 days	Indira Gandhi
5	Jagadish Swarup	5 June 1969	4 June 1972	2 years, 365 days	Indira Gandhi
6	Lal Narayan Sinha	17 July 1972	5 April 1977	4 years, 262 days	Indira Gandhi
7	S. N. Kacker	5 April 1977	2 August 1979	2 years, 119 days	Morarji Desai
8	Soli Jehangir Sorabjee	9 August 1979	25 January 1980	169 days	Charan Singh
9	Keshava Parasaran	6 March 1980	8 August 1983	3 years, 155 days	Indira Gandhi
10	Milon Kumar Banerji	4 April 1986	3 April 1989	2 years, 364 days	Rajiv Gandhi
11	Ashok Desai	18 December 1989	2 December 1990	349 days	V. P. Singh
12	A. D. Giri	4 December 1990	1 December 1991	362 days	Chandra Shekhar
13	Dipankar P. Gupta	9 April 1992	10 April 1997	5 years, 1 day	P. V. Narasimha Rao
13	Dipankar P. Gupta	9 April 1992	10 April 1997	5 years, 1 day	H. D. Deve Gowda
14	Tehmtan R. Andhyarujina	11 April 1997	4 April 1998	358 days	Inder Kumar Gujral
15	Nitte Santhosh Hegde	10 April 1998	7 January 1999	272 days	Atal Bihari Vajpayee
16	Harish Salve	1 November 1999	3 November 2002	3 years, 2 days	Atal Bihari Vajpayee
17	Kirit Raval	4 November 2002	19 April 2004	1 year, 167 days	Atal Bihari Vajpayee
18	Goolam Essaji Vahanvati	20 June 2004	7 June 2009	4 years, 352 days	Manmohan Singh
19	Gopal Subramaniam	15 June 2009	14 July 2011	2 years, 29 days	Manmohan Singh
20	Rohinton Fali Nariman	23 July 2011	4 February 2013	1 year, 196 days	Manmohan Singh
21	Mohan Parasaran	15 February 2013	26 May 2014	1 year, 100 days	Manmohan Singh
22	Ranjit Kumar	7 June 2014	20 October 2017	3 years, 135 days	Narendra Modi
23	Tushar Mehta	10 October 2018	Incumbent	7 years, 355 days	Narendra Modi

== Notes ==
1.Later appointed as the Attorney-General for India.
2.Later appointed as a judge in the Supreme Court of India.

== See also ==
- Attorney General of India
- Additional Solicitor General of India
- Advocate general (India)
- Mohan Jain, Additional Solicitor General of India (2009-2014)
