= Additional Solicitor General of India =

Law officer of India

Additional Solicitor General of India abbreviated as Addl. SGI is a law officer of India who assists the Solicitor-General and the Attorney-General. Addl. SGI is governed by Law Officers (Conditions of Service) Rules, 1987.

== List of incumbent Law Officers ==
The list of incumbent Law Officers (i.e. AGI, SGI, Addl. SGIs) as of 1 October 2026 is as follows:

List of Law Officers
Attorney General of India		Appointment	Term length
R. Venkataramani		1 October 2022	4 years, 3 days
Solicitor General of India		Appointment	Term length
Tushar Mehta		10 October 2018	7 years, 359 days
Additional Solicitor General of India		Appointment	Term length
Vikramjit Banerjee	Supreme Court	5 March 2018	8 years, 213 days
K. M. Nataraj	Supreme Court	14 January 2019	7 years, 263 days
Suryaprakash V. Raju	Supreme Court	30 June 2020	6 years, 96 days
N. Venkataraman	Supreme Court	30 June 2020	6 years, 96 days
Aishwarya Bhati	Supreme Court	30 June 2020	6 years, 96 days
S. Dwarakanath	Supreme Court	10 September 2024	2 years, 24 days
Archana Pathak Dave	Supreme Court	10 September 2024	2 years, 24 days
Brijender Chahar	Supreme Court	10 September 2024	2 years, 24 days
Rajkumar Bhaskar Thakare	Supreme Court	10 September 2024	2 years, 24 days
Raghavendra P. Shankar	Supreme Court	10 September 2024	2 years, 24 days
Davinder Pal Singh	Supreme Court	23 December 2025	285 days
Kanakamedala Ravindra Kumar	Supreme Court	23 December 2025	285 days
Anil Kaushik	Supreme Court	23 December 2025	285 days
Bharat Vyas	Rajasthan HC	1 October 2025	1 year, 3 days
Satya Pal Jain	Punjab & Haryana HC	8 April 2015	11 years, 179 days
Shashi Prakash Singh	Allahabad HC	9 February 2018	8 years, 237 days
AR. L. Sundaresan	Madras HC	19 December 2022	3 years, 289 days
Dhiraj Kumar Trivedi	Calcutta HC	9 June 2026	117 days
Chetan Sharma	Delhi HC	1 July 2020	6 years, 95 days
Dr. Krishna Nandan Singh	Patna HC	1 July 2020	6 years, 95 days
Prashant Pallava	Jharkhand HC	1 November 2025	337 days
K. Arvind Kamath	Karnataka HC	17 October 2023	2 years, 352 days
B. Narasimha Sharma	Telangana HC	17 October 2023	2 years, 352 days
Anil Chandrabali Singh	Bombay HC	10 March 2025	1 year, 208 days
Challa Dhanamjaya	Andhra Pradesh HC	27 January 2025	1 year, 250 days
Sunil Jain	Madhya Pradesh HC	29 September 2025	1 year, 5 days
P. Sreekumar	Kerala HC	23 March 2026	195 days

== Duties ==
Duties of Solicitor General of India and other law officers are laid out in Law Officers (Conditions of Service) Rules, 1987:

- to give advice to the Government of India upon such legal matters, and to perform such other duties of a legal character, as may from time to time, be referred or assigned to him by the Government of India.
- to appear, whenever required, in the Supreme Court or in any High Court on behalf of the Government of India in cases (including suits, writ petitions, appeal and other proceedings) in which the Government of India is concerned as a party or is otherwise interested;
- to represent the Government of India in any reference made by the President to the Supreme Court under Article 143 of the Constitution; and
- to discharge such other functions as are conferred on a Law Officer by or under the Constitution or any other Law for the time being in force.

== Restrictions of private practice ==
As law officers represent government of India, there are certain restrictions which are put on their private practice. A law officer is not allowed to:

- hold briefs in any court for any party except the Government of India or the government of a State or any University, Government School or College, local authority, Public Service Commission, Port Trust, Port Commissioners, Government aided or Government managed hospitals, a Government company, any Corporation owned or controlled by the State, any body or institution in which the Government has a preponderating interest;
- advise any party against the Government of India or a Public Sector Undertaking, or in cases in which he is likely to be called upon to advise, or appear for, the Government of India or a Public Sector Undertaking;
- defend an accused person in a criminal prosecution, without the permission of the Government of India; or
- accept appointment to any office in any company or corporation without the permission of the Government of India;
- advise any Ministry or Department of Government of India or any statutory organization or any Public Sector Undertaking unless the proposal or a reference in this regard is received through the Ministry of Law and Justice, Department of Legal Affairs.

== See also ==
- Attorney General of India
- Solicitor General of India
- Advocate general (India)
