= R. Venkataramani =

Indian lawyer and Attourney-General (born 1950)

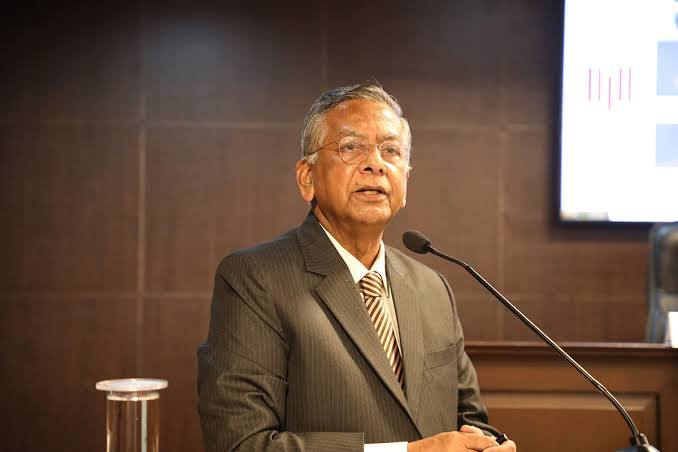

14th Attorney-General for India
- Incumbent
- Assumed office 1 October 2022
- Appointed by: Droupadi Murmu
- Preceded by: K. K. Venugopal

Personal details
- Born: 13 April 1950 (age 76) Pondicherry, French India
- Spouse: Vijayalakshmi Venkataramani
- Education: Loyola College; Madras University

R. Venkataramani (born 13 April 1950) is an Indian constitutional lawyer and a Senior Advocate in the Supreme Court of India. He is currently serving as the 16th Attorney-General for India. He has served as a Member, Law Commission of India in 2010 and 2013.

== Early life and career ==
Venkataramani was born on 13 April 1950 in Pondicherry. He studied at Petit Seminaire Higher Secondary School in Pondicherry. He graduated in Physics from Loyola College, Chennai. He then studied Law at Dr. Ambedkar Govt. Law College, Pondicherry.

Venkataramani became a registered lawyer with the Bar Council of Tamil Nadu in 1977 and later moved to the Supreme Court in 1979. At the Supreme Court of India, he worked at the chambers of P.P. Rao, Senior Advocate. He qualified as an Advocate-on-Record at the Supreme Court of India in March 1982. In 1997, he was designated as a Senior Advocate by the Supreme Court. Throughout his career, he represented various clients, including the central government, state governments, universities, and public sector entities, in both the Supreme Court and High Court. Additionally, he was a member of the Law Commission of India in both 2010 and 2013.

He has been appearing for the State of Tamil Nadu as a Special Senior Counsel for the past 12 years and also acting as Special Senior Counsel for the State of Andhra Pradesh.

Venkataramani acted as the receiver in the Amrapali case and also represented parties in the hijab row case in the Supreme Court of India. He has appeared as counsel for the Supreme Court in cases concerning the service conditions of court employees.

=== As Attorney General for India ===
He was appointed as Attorney General for India by the President of India by a notification dated 28 September 2022, where his term would begin after the completion of the term of the then Attorney General for India, K. K. Venugopal.

On 26 September 2025, the President of India extended his term as the Attorney General for India for a further period of two years till 30 September 2027.

== E20 petrol controversy ==
During a hearing before the Supreme Court concerning petitions related to ethanol supply allocation and the rollout of E20 petrol, several media reports and social media posts claimed that Attorney General of India R. Venkataramani had submitted that the Government's 20% ethanol-blended petrol (E20) programme was "still an ongoing experiment" and that its impact would become clearer by the following year. A short video clip from the hearing circulated on social media and was widely shared, contributing to public discussion regarding the Government's position on the E20 fuel policy. On 29 June 2026, the Office of the Attorney General for India and the Central Government issued an official clarification through the Press Information Bureau, stating that reports claiming the Attorney General had described the E20 programme as an "experiment" were "completely false" and did not reflect the submissions made before the Court. According to the clarification, the Attorney General had informed the bench that similar writ petitions concerning ethanol allocation to dedicated ethanol plants were pending before various High Courts and that transfer petitions were being filed so that common questions of law could be considered together, thereby avoiding parallel proceedings and conflicting decisions. The clarification further stated that no submission had been made describing either the Ethanol Blended Petrol (EBP) programme or the E20 blending programme as an "experiment".
