= C. K. Daphtary =

Former Attorney General of India

Member of Parliament, Rajya Sabha
- In office 3 April 1972 – 2 April 1978
- Constituency: Nominated

Attorney General of India
- In office 2 March 1963 – 30 October 1968
- Preceded by: M. C. Setalvad
- Succeeded by: Niren De

Solicitor General of India
- In office 28 January 1950 – 1 March 1963
- Succeeded by: H.N. Sanyal

Personal details
- Born: 1 April 1893
- Died: 18 February 1983 (aged 89)
- Spouse: Sushila Daphtary
- Children: 1 son and 2 daughters
- Awards: Padma Vibhushan (1967)

Chander Kishan Daphtary (1 April 1893 – 18 February 1983) was an Indian lawyer and was the first Solicitor General of India from 1950 to 1963. He was the Attorney General for India from 1963 to 1968. He was the President of the Bar Association of India. He was nominated to the Rajya Sabha the Upper House of Indian Parliament from 1972 to 1978. He was awarded the Padma Vibhushan in 1967.
