= Advocate general (India) =

Legal advisor to a state government in India

In India, an advocate general is a legal advisor to a state government. The post was created by the Constitution of India (vide Article 165) and corresponds to that of Attorney General for India at the union government level. The governor of each state shall appoint a person who is qualified to be appointed as judge of the High Court as the advocate general.

== List of advocates general in states ==
State	Advocate General
Arunachal Pradesh	Indraneel Chaudhary
Andhra Pradesh	Dhammalapati Srinivas
Assam	Devajit Saikia
Bihar	Satya Darshi Sanjay
Chhattisgarh	Praful Bharat
Goa	Devidas Pangam
Gujarat	Kamal Trivedi
Haryana	Pawan Kumar Mutneja
Himachal Pradesh	Anup Kumar Rattan
Jammu and Kashmir	D. C. Raina
Jharkhand	Rohitashya Roy
Karnataka	Shashi Kiran Shetty
Kerala	Jaju Babu
Madhya Pradesh	Prashant Singh
Maharashtra	Dr. Birendra Saraf
Manipur	Lenin Singh Hijam
Meghalaya	Amit Kumar
Mizoram	Biswajit Deb
Nagaland	Vikramjit Banerjee
Odisha	Pitambar Acharya
Punjab	Maninderjit Singh Bedi
Rajasthan	Shri Rajendra Prasad
Sikkim	Basava Prabhu S. Patil
Tamil Nadu	Vijay Narayan
Telangana	A. Sudarshan Reddy
Tripura	Siddhartha Shankar Dey
Uttar Pradesh	Ajay Kumar Mishra
Uttarakhand	S. N. Babulkar
West Bengal	Surajit Nath Mitra

== See also ==
- Solicitor General of India
- Directorate of Prosecution
- Chief secretary
- Director general of police
- Head of Forest Forces
