= M. C. Setalvad =

Indian jurist (c. 1884–1974)

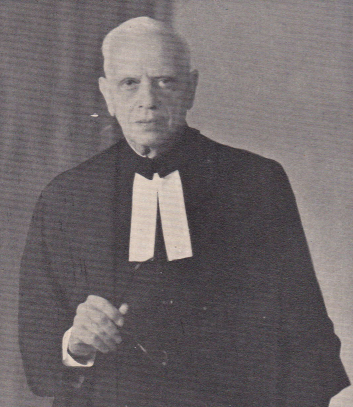

Attorney General for India
- In office 28 January 1950 – 1 March 1963

Chairman, 1st Law Commission of India
- In office 1955–1958

Personal details
- Born: 1884
- Died: 1974 (aged 89–90)
- Parent: Chimanlal Harilal Setalvad
- Relatives: Teesta Setalvad (grand daughter)
- Occupation: Lawyer
- Known for: India's first Attorney General.

Motilal Chimanlal Setalvad (c. 1884 – 1974) was an Indian jurist. Setalvad was the first and longest serving Attorney General for India, serving from 1950 to 1963. He also remained the Chairman of the first Law Commission of India (1955–1958), which has mandated for legal reform in the country by Government of India. He became the first Chairman of the Bar Council of India in 1961.

He was awarded the Padma Vibhushan, India's second highest civilian honor, by the Government of India in 1957.

== Biography ==
The son of noted lawyer Chimanlal Harilal Setalvad, Setalvad was born in Bombay. He studied at Government Law College, Mumbai.

Setalvad started practicing law in Bombay and eventually became Advocate General of Bombay and Attorney General for India in 1950, in the formative years of Government of India, under Jawaharlal Nehru.

Setalvad appeared for the government in a host of important and, at times, controversial cases. He was also involved with the Radcliffe Tribunal for demarcation of the India-Pakistan border and several UN proceedings on Kashmir. He chaired the first Law Commission of independent India, in which capacity he not just advised the government on crucial reforms and legislation but also created a framework for the Commission’s future functioning.

Setalvad died in 1974.

== Personal life ==
His son, Atul Setalvad (25 October 1933 - 22 July 2010) was a Mumbai-based lawyer and his daughter-in-law Sita Setalvad, a rural crafts exponent, while his granddaughter, Teesta Setalvad, is an activist and journalist.

== Bibliography ==
- My life; law and other things, 1970.
- Motilal Chimanlal Setalvad (1968). Bhulabhai Desai. Publications Division, Ministry of Information and Broadcasting, Government of India.
