= Capital punishment in India =

Death penalty in India

Ministry of Law and Justice
- Long title: Capital Punishment Legislature and functioning in India
- Citation: Source
- Territorial extent: All over India
- Enacted by: Government of India

Summary
- The legislation dealing on the subject of capital punishment and its working in Republic of India.

Keywords
- Capital punishment, India
- Status: In force

Capital punishment in India is the highest legal penalty for crimes under the country's main substantive penal legislation, the Bharatiya Nyaya Sanhita (formerly Indian Penal Code), as well as other laws. Executions are carried out by hanging as the primary method of execution. The method of execution per Section 393(5) of Bharatiya Nagarik Suraksha Sanhita, 2023 is "Hanging by the neck until dead", and the penalty is imposed only in the 'rarest of rare cases'.

Currently, there are around 564 prisoners on death row in India. The most recent executions in India took place on 20 March 2020, when four of the 2012 Delhi gang rape and murder case perpetrators were executed at the Tihar Jail in Delhi.

== History ==
In the Code of Criminal Procedure (CrPC), 1898 death was the default punishment for murder and required the concerned judges to give reasons in their judgment if they wanted to give life imprisonment instead. By an amendment to the CrPC in 1955, the requirement of written reasons for not imposing the death penalty was removed, reflecting no legislative preference between the two punishments. In 1973, when the CrPC was amended further, life imprisonment became the norm and the death penalty was to be imposed only in exceptional cases, particularly if a heinous crime committed deems the perpetrator too dangerous to even be 'considered' for paroled release into society after 20 years and required 'special reasons'. This significant change indicated a desire to limit the imposition of the death penalty in India.

== Capital offences ==
=== Capital punishment in the Bharatiya Nyaya Sanhita ===
Section under BNS or other law	Nature of crime
§ 65(2) of BNS	Rape of a child below 12 years of age
§ 66 of BNS	Rape and injury which causes death or leaves a woman in a Persistent Vegetative State
§ 70(2) of BNS	Gang rape of a child under 18 years of age
§ 71 of BNS	Repeat offenses in the context of rape
§ 103(1) of BNS	Murder
§ 103(2) of BNS	Mob Lynching
§ 104 of BNS	Murder by prisoner serving life sentence
§ 107 of BNS	Abetment of suicide of child or person of unsound mind
§ 109(2) of BNS	Attempted murder by prisoner serving life sentence
§ 111(2)(a) of BNS	Organized crime offenses causing death
§ 113(2)(a) of BNS	Terrorism resulting in the death of any person
§ 140(2) of BNS	Kidnapping or abducting in order to murder or for ransom
§ 147 of BNS	Treason against the Government of India
§ 160 of BNS	Abetment of mutiny, if mutiny is actually committed in consequence
§ 230(2) of BNS	Giving or fabricating false evidence with intent to procure conviction of capital offence resulting in death of innocent person
§ 232(2) of BNS	Threatening any person to give false evidence resulting in death of innocent person
§ 310(3) of BNS	Felony murder while committing dacoity or banditry

=== Capital punishment in non-BNS offences ===
Capital punishment in non BNS offence
Act	Section	Offence description
The Organized Crime Act, 2001	3 (1)	Organized crime resulting in death of person
Army Act, 1950	34	Offences in relation to enemy and punishable with death
Army Act, 1950	37	Mutiny
Army Act, 1950	38 (1)	Desertion
Assam Rifles Act, 2006	21	Offences in relation to enemy and punishable with death
Assam Rifles Act, 2006	24	Mutiny
Assam Rifles Act, 2006	25 (1) (a)	Desertion
Assam Rifles Act, 2006	55	Civil offences punishable by death under any civilian law in India
Bombay Prohibition (Gujarat Amendment) Act, 2009	65A (2)	Death caused by the consumption of Laththa
Border Security Force Act, 1968	14	Offences in relation to the enemy and punishable with death
Border Security Force Act, 1968	17	Mutiny
Border Security Force Act, 1968	18 (1) (a)	Desertion
Border Security Force Act, 1968	46	Civil offences
Coast Guard Act, 1978	17	Mutiny
Coast Guard Act, 1978	49	Civil offences
The Commission of Sati (Prevention) Act, 1987	41	Abetment of sati
The Defence of India, Act, 1971	5	Person contravening with intent to wage war or assist external aggression or any violation of provision made under S.3
The Geneva Convention Act 1960	3	Grave breaches of Geneva Conventions
The Explosive Substances Act, 1908	3 (b)	Punishment for special category of offences relating to explosive substances, likely to danger life or cause serious harm
The Indo-Tibetan Border Police Force, Act 1992	16	Offences in relation to enemy spy or terrorist
The Indo-Tibetan Border Police Force, Act 1992	19	Mutiny
The Indo-Tibetan Border Police Force, Act 1992	20 (1) (a)	Desertion
The Indo-Tibetan Border Police Force, Act 1992	49	Civil offences
The Karnataka Control of Organised Crime Act, 2000	3 (1) (i)	Organized crime resulting in death of person
The Maharashtra Control of Organised Crime Act, 1999	3 (1) (i)	Organized crime resulting in death of person
The Narcotics Drugs and Psychotropic Substances Act, 1985	31A (1)	Repeated commission of offences inolving commercial quantity of any narcotic drug or psychotropic substance

=== List of capital offences challenged in the court ===
Act	Section and offence description	Judicial challenges
Indian Penal Code	302 - Murder	Bachan Singh v. State of Punjab (1980)
Indian Penal Code	364 - Kidnapping for ransom	Vikram Singh & Anr v. Union of India (2020)
Indian Penal Code	376 E - Certain repeat offences in the context of rape	Vijay Jadhav v. State of Maharasthra (2019)
The Narcotics Drugs and Psychotropic Substances Act, 1985	31A (1)	Indian Harm Reduction v Union of India (2011)
Arms Act, 1959	27 (3) (Repealed)	State of Punjab v. Dalbir Singh (2012)

=== Categories of people exempted from capital punishment ===
Categories	Law or case
Juveniles	Section 21, Juvenile Justice Act (No minor in conflict with the law shall be sentenced to death)
People with mental illness or insanity	Shatrughan Chauhan v. Union of India (2014) (Para 79- 87)

== Process ==
=== Trial court ===
After the completion of proceedings as prescribed by the Code of Criminal Procedure (Bharatiya Nagarik Suraksha Sanitha), the judge pronounces the judgment in a case under Section 235. In case of conviction of the accused, there shall be a mandatory pre-sentencing hearing as according to Section 235(2), Code of Criminal Procedure. The Code of Criminal Procedure, 1973, also contains a provision regarding special reason for death sentence. Section 354(3) of the Code provides that the court must record "Special reasons" justifying the sentence and state as to why an alternative sentence would not meet the ends of justice in the case, according to the principle 'Life imprisonment is the rule and death sentence is the exception'.

=== Confirmation by High Court ===
After the decision and sentencing by the Court of Sessions, a high court needs to confirm it for the death sentence to be valid. The high court may confirm the death sentence awarded by the Court of Sessions, pass any other sentence warranted by law, annul the conviction, convict the person of any offence for which the Court of Sessions might have convicted them, order a new trial on the same or amended charge or acquit the accused person under Section 368, Code of Criminal Procedure. The High Court may also enhance the sentence awarded by the Court of Session to death sentence according to Section 386 (c), CrPC. The High Court shall not enhance the sentence awarded to the accused without giving them a reasonable opportunity of showing cause against such enhancement and while showing such cause, the accused may even plead for acquittal or reduction of sentence awarded by the Court of Session. Additionally, the State Government or the Central Government under Section 377, CrPC may direct the public prosecutor to appeal to the High Court against the sentence granted by the Court of Session on grounds of inadequacy. Further, exercising of its suo-moto revisional powers under Section 397, CrPC read with Section 401, CrPC, the High Court may, even in the absence of an appeal enhance the sentence awarded by the Court of Session. The High Court may also in accordance with Section 367 of the Code conduct or direct further inquiry into or additional evidence to be taken on any point bearing upon the guilt or innocence of the convicted person. Unless directed by the High Court, the accused need not be present during this period of this inquiry or when additional evidence is taken. The High Court also has the power under Section 407 of the CrPC to withdraw a case pending before a subordinate court and conduct the trial, and may award the sentence of death.

=== Special leave petition ===
After the death sentence is confirmed by the High Court, an appeal by Special Leave Petition (SLP) under Article 136 of the Constitution may be filed. The Supreme Court may in its discretion after considering the issues grant special leave to appeal under Article 136 of the Constitution. Exercising its power under Article 136, the Supreme Court decides whether the special leave petition deserve to be heard as appeals. Correcting an earlier trend of dismissal of SLPs involving the death sentence in limine (dismissal of Special Leave Petition at the threshold without giving any detailed reasons) it was held in two cases of Babasaheb Maruti Kamble v. State of Maharashtra, November 2018 and Jitendra @ Jeetu v. State Of Madhya Pradesh & Others, July 2020 that special leave petition filed in those cases where death sentence is awarded by the courts below, should not be dismissed without giving reasons, at least qua death sentence. It was opined that in such cases a deeper scrutiny coupled with reasons in support of death penalty should be given by the Court.

=== Review and reopening of a review ===
A petition seeking review of a judgment or order passed by the Supreme Court may be filed under Article 137 of the Constitution before the Supreme Court within thirty days from the date of such judgment or order. As per the Supreme Court in Mohd Arif @ Ashfaq v. The Registrar, Supreme Court of India & Ors, September 2014, review petitions for death sentence cases should be heard in open court, but there would be a time limit of 30 minutes for oral hearing. Such a procedure would be just and fair. The cases would be heard by a bench of three judges, and the special procedure would apply to all cases of death sentence where the review had been dismissed but the sentence was yet to be executed, including cases brought under Terrorist and Disruptive Activities (Prevention) Act. Various cases such as M. A. Antony @ Antappan v. State of Kerala, April 2009, Md. Mannan @ Abdul Mannan v. State Of Bihar, April 2011, Ambadas Laxman Shinde And Ors V. The State Of Maharashtra, October 2018 were reopened after being dismissed earlier to be heard in the open court after the above judgement, which resulted in commutations and an acquittal.

=== Curative petition ===
As per the Supreme Court judgment in Rupa Ashok Hurrah v. Ashok Hurrah & Ors, April 2002 after the dismissal of the review petition, the Supreme Court may allow a curative petition to reconsider its judgment or order if it is established that there was a violation of principles of natural justice or apprehension of bias on part of a judge. The Supreme Court in the said case held that in order to prevent abuse of its process and to cure gross miscarriage of justice, it may reconsider its judgements in exercise of its inherent powers. The curative petition would be circulated before the same bench which decided the review petition, if available, or the three senior-most judges of the Supreme Court. The curative petition would be disposed of without oral arguments, unless ordered otherwise by the Supreme Court.

=== Mercy ===
Articles 72 of the Constitution gives power to the President of India to grant pardons and to suspend, remit or commute sentences in certain cases. The president may consider the case of the convict and may pardon the death sentence. The Governor cannot pardon a death sentence. The Governor can only suspend, remit, or commute a death sentence under article 161 of the Constitution of India.

Various legal issues surrounding mercy petition has arisen time and again, one of them being delay. In V. Sriharan @ Murugan v. Union of India, February 1947, the Supreme Court reiterated that the clemency procedure under Article 72/161 provides a ray of hope to the condemned prisoners and his family members for commutation of death sentence into life imprisonment and, therefore, the executive should step up and exercise its time honoured tradition of clemency power of guaranteed in the constitution one way or the other within a reasonable time. In the case of Shatrughan Chauhan v. Union of India, January 2014, a three-judge bench of the Supreme Court delivered a landmark judgment on the death penalty: holding, in particular, that an excessive delay in carrying out the death sentence was an essential mitigating factor in a plea for commutation. This was also held in a previous case Triveniben V. State of Gujarat & Ors, February 1989 stating that the Court may consider whether there was undue long delay in disposing of mercy petition; whether the State was guilty of dilatory conduct and whether the delay was for no reason at all. Though the inordinate delay may be a significant factor, that by itself cannot render the execution unconstitutional. Further, the courts have also recognised some other supervening circumstances which should be considered during mercy petition such as mental illness/insanity, trauma, solitary confinement etc.

=== Death warrant ===
In cases where the death sentence is awarded, Form No. 42 in the Second Schedule of the Code of Criminal Procedure, 1973 contains the form of the "death warrant" or "black warrant". It is addressed to the superintendent of the relevant prison who is supposed to return the warrant to the court after certifying that the death sentence has been carried out. If a sessions court issues a death warrant before the end of the judicial and administrative process, it would amount to a serious violation of the law as laid down by the Supreme Court in Shabnam v. Union of India, May 2015 which affirmed the guidelines laid down by the Allahabad High Court in PUDR v. Union of India, January 2015. In Shabnam v. Union of India, the Supreme Court held that the principles of natural justice have to be read into death warrant proceedings. The convict should be allowed to exhaust all the legal remedies available such as appeal, review and mercy petitions. The guidelines given in the PUDR case are needed to be followed before issuing the death warrant.

== Constitutionality of the death penalty ==
Prior to the examination of Supreme Court of India, the abolition of the death sentence in India was examined by the 35th Law Commission report in response to a resolution moved by Raghunath Singh, Member of Lok Sabha. The Law Commission of India stressed on the reasoning that the conditions in India demands the contrary position to the proposition of 'abolition of death penalty' and concluded the death penalty should be retained. It said that the variety of upbringing, the diversity of the population, the disparity in the levels of education and morality and the paramount need for maintaining law and order were fundamental factors and issues that impede India from taking a favourable position to abolish the capital punishment. However, the jurisprudence regarding the capital sentence inordinately changed throughout various landmark judgments pronounced by the Supreme Court of India.

=== Supreme Court of India on the constitutional validity of the death penalty ===
The first challenge to the capital punishment in India came during the 1973 case of Jagmohan Singh v. State of U.P, October 1972. The judgment came before the CrPC was re-enacted in 1973, whereby the death sentence constituted an exceptional sentence. It was argued that the death penalty violates to the right to life and equality and guaranteed by the Indian Constitution. Moreover, the uncontrolled and unguided arbitrary discretion in the judges to impose capital punishment violates Article 14 of the Indian Constitution and the petitioners contended that the procedure for consideration of circumstances in order to pronounce finding and reasoning to make judicial decision between capital punishment and life imprisonment is not available under CrPC, 1898, therefore it violated Article 21 of the Indian Constitution. However, the Supreme Court of India refused to accept the argument and held that the death sentence is pronounced after detailed recording and evaluation of the aggravating and mitigating circumstances, thus such procedure justifies the imposition of capital punishment and does not violate Article 21 of the Indian Constitution. Moreover, the criticism of judge-centric or wide discretion on the judges on the fixation of the punishment is subject to the scrutiny of the superior judges and premised on the well recognized judicial principles. The judgment also discussed the US Supreme Court Decision in Furman v. Georgia, October 1971 where the US Supreme Court struck down the death sentence scheme as it violated the Eighth Amendment of the US Constitution as being cruel and unusual punishment. But, the Supreme Court of India refused to accept the reasoning and stated that there is no rational basis for concluding the death sentence as unconstitutional because the Indian Constitution does not have an equivalent to the Eighth Amendment.

=== Landmark cases on constitutionality of the death penalty ===
Since the incorporation of Code of Criminal Procedure, 1898, while imposing the death sentence, the courts were obliged to provide 'special reasons' for not imposing the death sentence. The true departure from death sentence as a norm to an exception came after the introduction of Code of Criminal Procedure re-enacted in 1973. The CrPC 1973 introduced Section 354(3), the section mandated that judge must provide 'special reasons' for inflicting or imposing the death sentence. Also, the CrPC 1973 introduced the Section 235(2), which allowed the post-conviction hearing on sentencing which drastically changed the jurisprudence allowing a careful evaluation and analysis of circumstances revolving around the jurisprudence of death sentence.

==== Rajendra Prasad v. State of Uttar Pradesh, February 1979 ====
Post the re-enactment of CrPC 1973, there was ambiguity in the jurisprudential understanding of 'special reasons' for imposing the death sentence. The Supreme Court in Rajendra Prasad v. State of Uttar Pradesh, February 1979 dealt with the legal policy on sentencing discretion and also comprehensively discussed the meaning of 'special reasons' for inflicting death sentence on exceptional grounds. The Court departed from retributive theory and emphasized on the deterrence and reformative theory as the social goals. Furthermore, the Court held that the 'special reasons' required to impose the capital punishment must not relate to the crime, but focus must be on the criminal.

==== Bachan Singh v. State of Punjab, May 1980 ====
The constitutional validity of death penalty was again challenged in the Bachan Singh v. State of Punjab, in May 1980, and it was premised on multiple new developments. Firstly, the re-enactment of CrPC 1973 had made the death penalty as an exception with regards to the rule of imposing life imprisonment for offences consist of choice between life imprisonment and death sentence. Secondly, the dictum of Rajendra Prasad v. State of Uttar Pradesh, February 1979, had interpreted the parameter on which 'death sentence' must be related to circumstance of the criminal and not the crime itself. Thirdly, it reviewed the death sentence in the light of Maneka Gandhi v. Union of India, January 1978 since every punitive action must satisfy the test of reasonableness after satisfying the golden triangle test of Articles 14, 19 and 21 of the Indian Constitution. The primary challenges to the death penalty in Bachan Singh v. State of Punjab, May 1980 was that the death punishment is unnecessary, cruel, inhumane and degrading treatment and the punishment of death sentence does not serve the purpose of deterrence. Furthermore, the constitutional validity of Section 302 of IPC and Section 366(2) of CrPC was challenged in this case on the ground that the imposition of death penalty is arbitrary and whimsical. However, the Supreme Court by a majority of 4:1 did not accept this contention and affirmed the constitutional validity of death sentence but propounded the doctrine of 'rarest of rare' as that the death sentence can only imposed 'in the rarest of rare cases when the alternative option is unquestionably foreclosed." Moreover, the Supreme Court ascertained that the "special reasons" in the context of inflicting death sentence must pay due regard to both the crime and criminal and the relative weight has to be given both aggravating and mitigating circumstance prior to the stating of special reasons for inflicting the death sentence. The Supreme Court recognized that the mitigating factors includes the mental condition, the age of the accused, the possibility of reforming or that the person committed the crime under the superior orders. The Supreme Court recognized and emphasized on the individual yet principled sentencing of the death sentence, the court refused to create categories, instead provided discretion to the judges to apply the principled reasoning of inflicting death sentence in each individual case on the basis of aggravating and mitigating circumstances.

In the dissenting opinion written by Justice P. N. Bhagawati in August 1982, two years after the majority's decision, he held the death penalty to be unconstitutional. He opined that the capital sentencing system, which required 'special reasons' without any guidance on its meaning, essentially left decision-making to the subjective assessment of individual judges, making it arbitrary.

==== Mithu v. State of Punjab, April 1983 ====
In this case, the court discussed Section 303 of the IPC which provided for a mandatory death sentence for offenders serving a life sentence. This section was based on the logic that any criminal who has been convicted for life and still can kill someone is beyond reformation and so, the only suitable punishment left would be death. It was discussed that the original idea behind drafting of this section was to discourage assaults by life convicts on the prison staff, but the language chosen by the legislature had widely exceeded its intention. It was held that Section 303 violated right to equality and right to life and personal liberty as conferred under Articles 14 and 21 of the Constitution.

==== Channulal Verma v. State of Chhattisgarh, November 2018 ====
In Channulal, the Supreme Court, through Justice Kurian Joseph noted that the time was appropriate to review the constitutionality of the death penalty and take into consideration reformative aspects of punishment. While dissenting on the question of propriety of the death penalty, the remaining two judges on the bench emphasized on the duty of courts to be constitutionally correct, even if its views are counter-majoritarian. Public opinion is generally formed by emotionally charged narratives which need not necessarily be legally correct, properly informed. They may even be against the values of rule of law and constitutionalism that courts are bound by. The court reiterated the view in Santosh Kumar Satishbhushan Bariyar v. State of Maharashtra that in death penalty sentencing, public opinion is neither an objective circumstance relating to crime nor to the criminal. The death sentence was commuted to life imprisonment after taking into consideration the possibility of reform and rehabilitation of the appellant that was evidenced by his good conduct in prison.

== Methods of execution ==
=== Execution by hanging ===
Hanging is an ancient method of execution which was a part of the Roman law, Anglo-Saxon law, English law, French law, and German law. Hanging as a punishment was a prevalent and standard mode of execution until the abolition of capital punishment in the United Kingdom in 1965. This traditional method of execution may involve suspending the convict from a gallows or crossbeam until death occurs from asphyxia, or it may be that the condemned person stands on a trapdoor and when the trap is released he falls a couple of metres until stopped by the rope tied around his neck or a knot in the noose helps jerk back the victim's head sharply enough to break the neck. This mode of execution is widely debated and the Law Commission in its report in 2015 stated that the shift from hanging to more advanced methods execution must be made in India.

In the case of Deena v Union of India, September 1983 the constitutional validity of execution by hanging was challenged on grounds that hanging as contemplated under Section 354(5) Cr.P.C was barbarous and inhuman and thereby infringed on the right to life of the person. The court discussed various historical influences as well as the reports of the law commission and held that execution by hanging was a fair, just and reasonable procedure within the meaning of Article 21 and hence is constitutional.

In the case of Rishi Malhotra v. Union of India, October 2017, hanging as a method of execution was challenged in a writ petition and it was argued that Section 354(5) CrPC was not only barbaric, inhuman and cruel but also against the resolutions adopted by the United Nations Economic & Social Council (ECOSOC). This case brought out the discussion around the shift from hanging to other advanced methods of execution in various developed countries. It was also discussed that as per international standard, execution should be as quick and as simple as possible and should produce immediate unconsciousness passing quickly into death.

=== Execution by shooting ===
Apart from hanging, the other method of execution allowed under the Indian law is shooting, which is provided for under the Army Act, Navy Act, and Air Force Act. Section 34 of the Air Force Act, 1950 empowers the court martial to impose the death sentence for the offences mentioned in Section 34 (a) to (o) of The Air Force Act, 1950. It is at the discretion of the court martial whether the method is by hanging or shooting. The Army and Navy Acts have similar provisions. Section 163 of the act provides for the form of the sentence of death as;

"In awarding a sentence of death, a court-martial shall, in its discretion, direct that the offender shall suffer death by being hung by the neck until he is dead or shall suffer death by being shot."

== Sentencing procedure and framework: Landmark cases ==
=== Sentencing procedure ===
Section 235(2) of the CrPC provides for a bifurcated trial, where the conviction and sentencing are meant to be separate proceedings. This has been affirmed in the following judgments of the Supreme Court.

==== Santa Singh v. State of Punjab, August 1976 ====
The Supreme Court held that sentencing is an important stage in the process of administration of criminal justice and required an interdisciplinary approach. The words "hear the accused" in Section 235(2) of the Code of Criminal Procedure, 1973 were interpreted to mean that the accused had to be given an opportunity to place before the Court various circumstances relating to the sentence, and was not limited to just an oral hearing. It was further stated that non-compliance of Section 235(2) is not an irregularity curable under Section 465 of the Code of Criminal Procedure, 1973 as it amounts to omitting an important stage of the trial. In his concurring opinion, Justice Fazl Ali stated that an opportunity to give evidence in respect of sentence may necessitate an adjournment; and to avoid delay, the adjournment ordinarily should be for not more than 14 days. The matter was remanded to the Trial Court for giving an opportunity to the accused to make a representation regarding the sentence.

==== Dagdu v. State of Maharashtra, April 1977 ====
The Supreme Court held that the decision in Santa Singh v. State of Punjab, August 1976 cannot be read to say that failure on the part of the court to 'hear' an accused on the question of sentence must necessarily entail a remand to the trial court. After convicting an accused, courts must unquestionably hear him on the question of sentence but if they omit to do so, it would be open to the higher court to remedy the breach by giving a real and effective hearing to the accused on the question of sentence. The accused must be permitted to adduce before the Court all the data which he desires to adduce on the question of sentence. The Court may adjourn the matter in order to give to the accused sufficient time to make submissions on sentence. Consequently, the Supreme Court granted liberty to the accused persons to produce materials on the question of sentence.

==== Mukesh v. State of NCT of Delhi, May 2017 ====
It was argued by the accused persons that the Trial Judge had not considered the aggravating and mitigating circumstances in respect of each individual accused. The Court went through the law laid down by the Supreme Court in Santa Singh v. State of Punjab, August 1976 and Dagdu v. State of Maharashtra, April 1977, and held that there are two modes to cure sentencing defects- 1. to remand the matter; 2. to direct the accused persons to produce necessary data and advance the contention on the question of sentence. Following the second mode, the Court gave an opportunity to the accused persons to file affidavits along with documents stating the mitigating circumstances. The counsels for the accused were allowed daily visits to the prison in order to communicate with the accused persons and file the requisite affidavits and materials. The prosecution was also granted liberty to file affidavits in response to the ones filed by the accused. The final judgment in this case was delivered on 5 May 2017.

=== Sentencing framework ===
In Bachan Singh v. State of Punjab, May 1980, a five-judge bench of the Supreme Court of India while upholding the constitutionality of the death penalty in India, also laid down an elaborate sentencing framework, requiring sentencing judges to impose the punishment only in the 'rarest of rare' cases. The 'rarest of rare' doctrine developed in Bachan Singh requires judges to balance aggravating and mitigating circumstances while determining whether a death sentence is the appropriate punishment. Other landmark judgments which have elaborated on the 'rarest of rare' framework are as follows:

==== Machhi Singh v. State of Punjab, July 1983 ====
The Supreme Court attempted to explore the doctrine of rarest of rare in the Machhi Singh v. State of Punjab, July 1983, three years after the Bachan Singh v. State of Punjab, May 1980 judgment. The court reinstated and reemphasized the principles of sentencing policy propounded in the Bachan Singh case. Also, the Court listed the two question that needs to be answered prior to the imposition of death sentence on individual cases. Firstly, is the offence committed so exceptional that there is no scope for awarding any other sentence? Secondly, even when weightage is accorded to the mitigating circumstances does the circumstances still warrants death penalty? It was held that the judges must prepare a balance sheet of aggravating and mitigating circumstance of the crime and criminal and analyze the factors prior to making up choice between death sentence and life imprisonment. However, the Supreme Court held that the death penalty may imposed on the ground where the collective conscience of the society is shocked that expect the judicial authorities impose the death sentence. Thereafter, it listed five categories of the cases, where the death sentence is appropriate. (i) Manner in which the crime was committed: Murder committed in an extremely brutal, grotesque, diabolical, revolting or drastic manner so as to arouse intense and extreme indignation of the community; (ii) Motive behind the criminal act: Murder committed for a motive which evinces total depravity and meanness; (iii) The Nature of the crime: Murder that arouse social wrath (like homicide of a person belonging to SC/ST or a minority community, dowry-death etc.); (iv)The degree of the crime: Multiple murders of a family or a large number of persons of a particular caste, community, or locality; and (v) The Status of the victim: Murder of an innocent child or a helpless woman or a person rendered helpless by old age or infirmity; murder of a person by the murderer who is in a position of domination or trust or murder of a public figure generally loved and respected by the community for the services rendered by him and the murder is committed for political or similar reasons other than personal reasons. It focused more on the 'crime factors' or adopted 'crime centric approach' on the sentencing policy of the death sentence. Furthermore, it moved towards the practice of balancing aggravating and mitigating circumstances to impose death sentence, where Bachan Singh judgment mandated that death sentence be imposed where life imprisonment is unquestionably foreclosed. Thus, this precedent and subsequent line of cases had systematically permitted the justification of death sentence on the manner, nature and gravity of the crime, without taking into the account of circumstances of the criminal, in order to exercise judicial discretion on the death sentence.

==== Ravji v. State of Rajasthan, December 1995 ====
The fundamental contribution of Bachan Singh was that the focus of sentencing policy in regards to the death penalty shifted from crime to crime and criminal both. However, this judicial contribution was drastically altered in the Ravji v. State of Rajasthan, December 1995. The two bench of Supreme Court held that the nature and gravity of the crime, not the criminal should be considered as an appropriate method, for opting between choice of life imprisonment and death penalty. Subsequently, the precedent in Ravji was relied on as authoritative precedent. These judgments confirmed the death sentence without considering any mitigating circumstances related to the criminal. This position was directly contradictory to Constitutional bench judgment of Bachan Singh v. State of Punjab, May 1980. Finally, the Ravji v. State of Rajasthan, December 1995 decision delivered by the Supreme Court of India was rendered as per incuriam by another bench of Supreme Court in Santhosh Kumar Satishbhushan Bariyar v. State of Maharashtra, May 2009.

==== Santhosh Kumar Satishbhushan Bariyar v. State of Maharashtra, May 2009 ====
The Santhosh Kumar Satishbhushan Bariyar v. State of Maharashtra, May 2009 judgment holds an important position in the attempt of Supreme Court to principally regulate the judicial discretion and bring consistency in the sentencing discretion of the judiciary in regards to death penalty. The Supreme Court in Bariyar held that the exclusive focus on the crime provided in the Ravji v. State of Rajasthan, December 1995 precedent is per incuriam, as it breaches the principles revolving around doctrine of rarest of rare propounded in Bachan Singh v. State of Punjab, May 1980. The Bariyar judgment again reemphasized that the aggravating and mitigating circumstances related to the sentencing discretion must not only be limited to crime alone, but both the factor crime and criminal should be taken into account. It has interpreted the Bachan Singh dictum in a radical manner, specifically on the sentencing aspect of death penalty. The Court expressed concern that there is lack of consistency and coherence in the aspect of sentencing discretion in regards to death penalty. The first and foremost contribution of Bariyar judgment is that it undoubtedly rejected the strict channelling of discretion or classification of particular types of offences deserves death sentence. The Supreme Court emphasized that the weight accorded to the aggravating and mitigating circumstances must be decided on the case to case basis. Furthermore, it also deconstructed the notion of 'shock to the collective conscience' as standard to impose the death sentences. The Court categorically stated the relevance and desirability of 'public opinion', is no more important in the jurisprudence and adjudication of death sentences. It also disregarded the social necessity as criteria for the infliction of death sentence. The Court asserted that the judiciary is a counter-majoritarian institution and individual rights should be given more importance.

==== Sangeet v. State of Haryana, November 2012 ====
The Supreme Court in Sangeet v. State of Haryana, November 2012, seriously expressed reservation regarding inconsistent and incoherent application of sentencing policy with respect to analyzing the aggravating and mitigating circumstances. The court critiqued the process of drawing a balance sheet of aggravating and mitigating circumstances and stated that they cannot be compared with each other as each of the factors are two distinct and different constituents of the incident. Moreover, the court itself admitted that the doctrine of rarest of rare is not followed properly and departed from the 'principled sentencing' to a judge-centric sentencing policy of the death sentence. Furthermore, the Supreme Court also critiqued the categorization of the crime (manner of commission of murder, motive for commission of murder, antisocial or socially abhorrent nature of the crime, magnitude of crime and personality of victim of murder) propounded in Machhi Singh v. State of Punjab, July 1983. The Court noted that Machi Singh standardization of the crime considerably enlarged the scope of imposing death sentence, which was severely restricted in Bachan Singh v. State of Punjab, May 1980 and also affirmed that the standardization shall not be taken as absolute or inflexible rule in the sentencing policy of the death sentence.

==== Shanker Kisanrao Khade v. State of Maharashtra, April 2013 ====
The Supreme Court in Shanker Kisanrao Khade v. State of Maharashtra, April 2013, acknowledged that the difficulty in the application of 'rarest of rare' since there is lack of empirical data for making twofold comparison between murder (not attracting death penalty) and murder (attracting penalty). The Court also envisaged a new triple test, while awarding the death sentence and it required 'crime test'. 'criminal test' and the 'rarest of rare test' and this test was not equivalent to 'balance test'. The Court stated that the death sentence can only be inflicted, once they satisfy the 'crime test 100%', 'criminal test 0%' (there must no mitigating circumstances favouring the accused) such as possibility of reform, young age of the accused, lack of intention to commit the crime, no antecedents of criminal record. Once the aggravating circumstances are the fullest extent and no mitigating circumstances, the court needs to be satisfied with the rarest of rare case. The rarest of rare must be depended on the 'society centric' instead of 'judge centric' as to whether society approve death sentence in the awarding of the death penalty.

==== Rajendra Prahladrao Wasnik v. State of Maharashtra, December 2018 ====
In this case, the accused was convicted of the rape and murder of a three-year-old girl. In review, a three-judge bench commuted his sentence to life imprisonment. Invoking Bachan Singh, the Court observed that it was required to consider the probability of reform and rehabilitation and not its possibility or its impossibility... 'it is the obligation on the prosecution to prove to the court, through evidence, that the possibility is that the convict cannot be reformed or rehabilitated'. The Court also held that mere pendency of one or more criminal cases against a convict cannot be a factor for consideration while awarding sentence.

==== Manoharan v. State by Inspector of Police, August 2019 ====
The Supreme Court, through the majority opinion of Justice Nariman, upheld the sentence of death imposed upon the appellant. Justice Sanjeev Khanna dissented on the question of sentence and chose the lesser sentence of life imprisonment without remission. In his dissenting opinion, Justice Khanna noted that the Court in Machhi Singh v. State of Punjab, July 1983 required two questions to be answered to determine if a case was rarest of rare. These were whether there was something uncommon about the crime which rendered life imprisonment inadequate and whether the circumstances of the crime were such that there was no alternative but to impose the death sentence. Justice Khanna opined that the five categories indicated by the court in Machhi Singh v. State of Punjab, July 1983 (manner of commission of murder, motive of the murder, anti-social or abhorrent nature of the crime, magnitude of the crime and personality of the victim) related to the first question. The second question also has to be answered which could be done by reference to mitigating circumstances. He reiterated that the death sentence could be imposed only when the sentence for life is unquestionably foreclosed. In the facts of the case, Justice Khanna noted that the appellant had confessed to the crime before a magistrate without compulsion and this, he stated, was the first step back into society and should be treated as a mitigating circumstance. He therefore opined that the appropriate punishment in this case would be life imprisonment without remission.

== Role of public opinion ==
The role of public opinion first gained prominence in the capital sentencing framework through the case of Machhi Singh v. State of Punjab, July 1983, which allowed imposition of the death penalty in case of anti-social or socially abhorrent nature of the crime.

Subsequently, in the case of Dhananjoy Chatterjee v. State of West Bengal, January 1994, the Supreme Court held that the punishment must befit the crime so that courts reflect public abhorrence of the crime. It held that courts must consider not only the rights of the criminal, but also the rights of the victim and society at large while considering the question of appropriate sentence.

Recently, in MA Antony v. State of Kerala, December 2018, the Supreme Court commuted the death sentence into life imprisonment and noted that the trial court committed an error by taking into account the disturbance caused by the crime to the collective conscience of the society. It was held that reference to public opinion and what is perceived by the judges to be the collective conscience of the society must be avoided while sentencing a convict guilty of a brutal crime.

However, public opinion and collective conscience have played a major role in imposition of the death penalty in several cases in India, including Mukesh v. State of NCT Delhi, May 2017, which resulted in the execution in March 2020 of four persons convicted of gang rape and murder of a young woman in Delhi.

== Residual doubt ==
In Ashok Debbarma v. State of Tripura, March 2014, the Supreme Court commuted the death sentence to life imprisonment with a minimum of twenty years. It introduced the concept of 'residual doubt' as a mitigating circumstance in Indian sentencing jurisprudence. The court stated that there could be a state of lingering uncertainty that exists, beyond 'reasonable doubt' but below 'absolute certainty'.

In 2019, the Supreme Court reiterated the 'residual doubt principle' of Ashok Debbarma in Ravishankar v. State of Madhya Pradesh, October 2019 and held that it creates a higher standard of proof over and above the 'beyond reasonable doubt' threshold in order to sentence someone to death.

== Life imprisonment without remission or parole ==
=== Union of India v. V. Sriharan Murugan, December 2015 ===
One of the questions involved the validity of the special category of sentence as created by Swamy Shraddhanada @ Murli Manohar Mishra v. State of Karnataka, July 2008. The court held that the special category of sentence created by Swamy Shraddhanada @ Murli Manohar Mishra v. State of Karnataka, July 2008 was valid in law. It further added that such a sentence could only be imposed by the high courts or the Supreme Court. However, the constitutional powers of remission under Articles 72 and 161 would be unaffected by such a sentence. The dissenting judges, Lalit and Sapre, speaking through Lalit held that such a sentence was not valid in law as it would amount to legislating a new sentence, and it was also trenching into the domain of the executive.

== Mental illness and death penalty ==
The law provided for certain persons to be exceptions to the liabilities imposed by Criminal law. The law assumes persons such as children below the age of 7 and insane persons to be incapable of understanding the consequences of their act and therefore does not hold them accountable for any of the offences. The rule further extends to death penalty as well, i.e. persons who are insane and declared so by a competent court, cannot be given death penalty. The legality of the death sentence and its relation with the mental illness of the accused was discussed in various cases by the Indian Judiciary.

In the case of Devender Pal Singh Bhullar (Navneet Kaur v. NCT of Delhi, March 2014), the Court commuted the death sentence of the convict on the ground of inordinate delay in the execution of sentence and mental health problems faced by the petitioner.

In the case of Shatrughan Chauhan v. Union of India, January 2014, while discussing various other supervening circumstances which would lead to the sentence of death being commuted, it was held that mental illness of the prisoner would be a factor which would lead to a commutation and that no mentally ill person may be executed.

In Accused X v. State of Maharashtra, April 2019, the Supreme Court in this case recognized post conviction mental illness as a mitigating factor to convert death penalty to life imprisonment. The SC noting that there appear to be no set disorders or disabilities for evaluating the 'severe mental illness' laid down 'test of severity' as a guiding factor for recognizing those mental illnesses which qualify for an exemption. The court noted that these disorders generally include schizophrenia, other serious psychotic disorders, and dissociative disorders with schizophrenia. Therefore, the test envisaged herein predicates that the offender needs to have a severe mental illness or disability, which simply means that a medical professional would objectively consider the illness to be most serious so that he cannot understand or comprehend the nature and purpose behind the imposition of such punishment. The notion of death penalty and the sufferance it brings along causes incapacitation and is idealised to invoke a sense of deterrence. If the accused is not able to understand the impact and purpose of his execution because of his disability, the purpose for the execution itself collapses.

== Sexual violence and calls for the death penalty ==
=== Nirbhaya and Justice Verma Committee Report ===
The infamous and brutal gang rape case also known as the Nirbhaya rape case brought the issue of sexual violence into the notice of public, media and the Government of India. Responding to the protests and campaigns the government formed a committee headed by former Chief Justice of India, Justice J.S. Verma, Justice Leila Seth, and Mr Gopal Subramanium, former Solicitor General of India. The Committee submitted its report on 23 January 2013. It made recommendations on laws related to rape, sexual harassment, trafficking, child sexual abuse, medical examination of victims, police, electoral and educational reforms. The committee did not recommend the death sentence for sexual offences. The committee proposed "life imprisonment for the remainder of the convict's natural life" as the punishment for repeat offenders. In its conclusion on capital punishment for sexual offences, the committee held:

"In India in the context of international law as well as the law as explained in the American Courts, it would be a regressive step to introduce the death penalty for rape even where such punishment is restricted to the rarest of rare cases. It is also stated that there is considerable evidence that the deterrent effect of the death penalty on serious crimes is actually a myth. According to the Working Group on Human Rights, the murder rate has declined consistently in India over the last 20 years despite the slowdown in the execution of death sentences since 1980. Hence we do take note of the argument that the introduction of the death penalty for rape may not have a deterrent effect. However, we have enhanced the punishment to mean the remainder of life."

=== Criminal Law (Amendment) Act 2013 ===
In consonance with the recommendations made by the Justice Verma Committee, the Government of India enacted the amending Act on 02.04.2013. Amendments were introduced in the Indian Penal Code, 1860, Code of Criminal Procedure, 1973 and the Indian Evidence Act, 1872 through the Criminal Law (Amendment) Act, 2013.

The amendment has led to the insertion of four new sections and recognised certain acts as offences. New offences like acid attack, sexual harassment, voyeurism, and stalking were incorporated into the Indian Penal Code under Sections 326A, 326B, 354A, 354B, 354C and 354D. The amendment brought some significant changes to the sections governing rape laws in IPC by enlarging the meaning of rape under Section 375. Further Section 376A was added which states that if a person committing the offence of sexual assault, "inflicts an injury which causes the death of the person or causes the person to be in a persistent vegetative state, shall be punished with rigorous imprisonment for a term which shall not be less than twenty years, but which may extend to imprisonment for life, which shall mean the remainder of that person's natural life, or with death." The amendment has also introduced the death penalty as a punishment in Section 376E for cases of repeat offences of rape.

Capital punishment for these specific offences was introduced through the Verma Committee categorically recommended against the punishment of death for the offence of rape.

=== State amendments and Criminal Law Amendment Act, 2018 ===
In the wake of public resentment over Kathua and Unnao rape cases, the laws dealing with sexual assault and rape underwent a major change. It started with several states like Madhya Pradesh, Haryana, Rajasthan and Arunachal Pradesh passing bills in their respective assemblies prescribing the death penalty for those convicted of raping girls less than 12 years. Later, Criminal Law (Amendment) Ordinance, 2018 was brought about in April, 2018. The bill was passed by both the Houses of Parliament by 6 August 2018 and received Presidential assent. During review, it was opposed by some of the MPs in the Rajya Sabha. The Criminal Law Amendment Act, 2018, amended the Indian Penal Code, 1860, Indian Evidence Act, 1872, the Code of Criminal Procedure, 1973 and the Protection of Children from Sexual Offences Act, 2012. The Act amends the IPC to allow for the death penalty as punishment for rape of girls below the age of 12 years. The deadline for the completion of trial in all rape cases will be two months. A six-month time limit for disposal of appeals in rape cases has also been prescribed. There will also be no provision for anticipatory bail for a person accused of rape or gang rape of a girl less than 16 years. In 2019, an amendment to the Protection of Children from Sexual Offences Act, 2013 (POCSO) sought to cover all children under this law.

== Debate in India ==
=== India's history voting against moratorium ===
The abolition of the death penalty has been a debatable question all across and has been called upon for discussion in various international forums. According to the International Covenant on Civil and Political Rights (ICCPR) capital punishment has been regulated as one part of right to life in the international human rights treaty. The covenant does not abolish death penalty but under Article 6 it states that death sentence may be imposed only for most serious crimes in accordance with the law and other provisions in the covenant. Further the convict sentenced with death shall have right to seek pardon or commutation of sentence and death sentence cannot be imposed on a person below 18 years of age or pregnant woman. The Convention on the Rights of the Child (CRC) also lays down provisions on similar lines stating that no child (person below eighteen years of age) can be subjected to torture or other cruel treatment such as life imprisonment without possibility of release. The Convention against Torture and Cruel, Inhuman or Degrading Treatment or Punishment or the Torture Convention itself does not declare death penalty as torture or cruel, inhuman or degrading treatment or punishment but addresses the methods of execution and the process of death row. Among the above-mentioned treaties and conventions India has ratified the ICCPR and CRC and is only a signatory of the Torture Convention. But according to Article 18 of the Vienna Convention on the Laws of Treaties the state is bound to refrain from acts which would defeat the purpose of a treaty. Under the domestic laws, The Protection of Human Rights Act, 1994 in Section 2(1)(d) states that, "human rights" means the rights relating to life, liberty, equality and dignity of the individual guaranteed by the Constitution or embodied in the International Covenants and enforceable by courts in India. Additionally Section 2(1)(f) states that, "International Covenants" means the ICCPR. Reading together Sections 2(1)(d) and 2(1)(f) it can be said the ICCPR has been incorporated into the given statute protecting human rights.

UN General Assembly has called for a moratorium on the use death penalty through several resolutions. In 2007, the General Assembly called for taking a progressive step by restricting the use of the death penalty, minimizing the number of offences imposing death penalty and imposing a moratorium on the executions to respect for the human dignity and enhance the development of the human rights. These resolutions for moratorium were reaffirmed by the general assembly again in the subsequent years of 2008, 2010, 2012, 2014. India has voted against these resolutions stating that it shall go against the statutory law of the land which states that death sentences can be imposed in rarest of the rare cases.

=== Judicial Discretion and Controversy ===
In September 2026, Additional District and Sessions Judge Ravi Kumar Diwakar of Muzaffarnagar, Uttar Pradesh, drew national scrutiny after issuing his 23rd death sentence within a five-month span. The frequency of these rulings prompted the Muzaffarnagar District and Sessions Judge to execute an administrative order recalling 97 pending capital offense cases from Diwakar's court. The surge in sentences reignited intense debate surrounding the Supreme Court of India's established "rarest of rare" doctrine.

== Law Commission reports ==
=== 35th report (1967) ===
The first report of the Law Commission considering the issue of abolition of capital punishment was released in 1967. The commission recommended the retention of capital punishment. The factors considered for arriving at the conclusion were based mainly on general elements of cultural and social life as it existed then. The Law Commission observed that the subjective discretion of the court in deciding the matters satisfactorily practised and was within the purview of judicial principles. The report observed that the exercise of discretion may depend on local conditions, future developments, and evolution of the moral sense of the community, state of crime at a particular time or place and many other unforeseeable features. Furthermore, the report of the law commission does not discuss in detail the apprehensions regarding the arbitrary use of the Court's discretion in capital sentencing. The report also suggested retention of Section 303 of the Indian Penal Code, which provides for mandatory death penalty which was further upheld unconstitutional by the Supreme Court in the case of Mithu v. State of Punjab, April 1983.

On the matters of irrevocability of capital punishment and erroneous convictions, the report observed that the constitutional and statutory safeguards such as the mercy, the power of appeal and review as well as legal assistance shall ensure that chances of error are kept to the minimum. The conclusions arrived by the commission are predated to the landmark judgment of Bachan Singh v. State of Punjab, May 1980 and also to the various amendments made in 1973 to the Code of Criminal Procedure.

=== 187th report (2003) ===
In its 187th report, the Law Commission dealt with the matter on capital punishment under but under the theme "Mode of Execution of Death Sentence and Incidental Matters". The issue was taken suo moto by the commission examining "technological advances in the field of science, technology, medicine, anaesthetics" and thus did not answer or present views on the debate of abolishing capital punishment.

=== 262nd report (2015) ===
The Law Commission of India submitted its 262nd report in 2015 on the issue of the death penalty in India. The issue came up to the Law Commission chaired by Justice A.P Shah in the case of Santosh Kumar Satishbhushan Bariyar v. State of Maharashtra, April 2009 and Shankar Kisanrao Khade v. State of Maharashtra, April 2013. The commission extensively studied various aspects of death penalty such as a role of deterrence, uniform applicability of guidelines, victim justice and concluded that the punishment should be abolished except for in the matters of terrorism. The Commission concluded after studying the issue extensively that the death penalty does not serve the penological goal of deterrence any more than life imprisonment. It was opined that it fails to achieve any constitutionally valid penological goals. The Law Commission also concluded that in focusing on the death penalty as the ultimate measure of justice to victims, the restorative and rehabilitative aspects of justice are lost sight of.[18] The discretionary power of judges and uneven application of Bachan Singh v. State of Punjab, May 1980 in these cases goes against the constitutional principles and principle of equality making the whole process arbitrary and subjective to whims of the judges. The commission also identified some systematic impediments such as lack of resources, outdated modes of investigation, over-stretched police force, ineffective prosecution, and poor legal aid making the administration of the death penalty vulnerable to errors. The commission also concluded that constitutional and statutory safeguards such as Article 72 and Article 161 have also failed to safeguard the rights from these impediments. With relation to supporting death for those convicted in terror cases and for waging war against the country, the Report admitted that there is no valid penological justification for treating terrorism differently from other crimes, but the concern of the times seems to be that removing of the death penalty for these offences will affect national security.

=== Divergent views ===
There are divergent views on which the death penalty in being currently debated over in India. It has been argued by many academicians and many research groups that the presence of such inhumane punishment serves no purpose in the current times. India certainly does not need it as it serves no purpose. It is argued that no study has shown that the death penalty deters murder more than life imprisonment and that evidence is to the contrary. For deterrence to work, the severity of the punishment has to coexist with the certainty and swiftness of the punishment.[19] It has been argued that the death penalty targets the poor and marginalised who do not have support from the society or power of money. The death penalty is subjective in nature and is near to impossible deciding each case fairly or rationally. The Courts have in various cases worked on their fancies and arbitrarily imposed this most extreme punishment. It is also argued that the concept works in contrast to the rehabilitation criminal justice system adopted by India [19]. Further, it has also been argued that it is per se cruel, irrespective of its utility or its deterrent effect.

On the other hand, it has been argued that state-sanctioned death penalty acts as a catalyst to promote the law and the fear of law which acts as a deterrent to future offenders. There is also a push to help the victims and to follow the retribution model of punishment.

=== Systemic issues ===
Capital punishment has been criticised due to the alleged imperfections of the justice system in India. The quality of legal representation has emerged as an extremely serious concern. Specific critiques against legal representation include the absence of communication between defendants and their lawyers, courtroom proceedings that they do not understand, and little knowledge of progress in their case at the appellate stages.

==== Issues in criminal justice system ====
Constitutional and legal protections such as The Constitution of India, The Code of Criminal Procedure, The Evidence Act protect an individual from arbitrary powers of the state. However, despite these the rights are unchecked and are repeatedly violated. Few forms of such violation are custodial torture, fabrication of evidence, abuse of Section 27 of the Evidence Act.

==== Legal representation ====
It has been acknowledged by the judges that the legal aid system has not satisfactory and expressed concerns about the disparate impact of the system on socio-economically marginalised persons. There exists a strong connection between poverty and the quality of legal representation. This deepens the crisis of the criminal justice system. The legal aid system developed by the justice system fails to achieve its objective and fails to fulfil its constitutional promises.

==== Wrongful convictions ====
The manipulation of agencies of the criminal justice system is rampant in India. The stages of investigation such as obtaining pieces of evidence testimony lead to wrongful conviction demonstrate significant crisis points in the criminal justice system. Use of torture, fabrication of evidence, poor legal representation puts a question mark on the criminal justice system and makes the reliance on evidence doubtful for hanging a person or to put him on death row.

== Research on the death penalty in India ==
=== Lethal Lottery: Death Penalty in India ===
Lethal Lottery: Death Penalty in India is a report submitted by Amnesty International with contribution of The People's Union for Civil Liberties. The report puts forth the view that India's Death Penalty System works under fatal flaws and should be abolished. As indicated by the name the report after analysing 700 Supreme Court judgements on death penalty of over 50 years (1950–2006) suggest that the fate of the death row prisoners depends upon the lottery as the Indian judicial system over the years has failed to meet its own uniform standards and the other internationally accepted standards. The golden rule in respect to death penalty "rarest of rare cases" has not been adhered to in the cases. Various administrative flaws such as errors in consideration of evidence, inadequate legal representation, and arbitrariness in sentencing indicate that the punishment of death penalty has been arbitrary, imprecise and abusive means of punishing convicts which goes against the spirit of the constitution.

=== Prisoner Voices from Death Row ===
Prisoner Voices from Death Row by Reena Mary George discusses the demographic profile of the prisoners and the duration spent on death row. It also notes the process of the individual cases, from arrest to conviction and finally being sentenced to death. It also documents in detail the impact of the death penalty on families of prisoners on death row. The study finds that poverty, marginalization and exclusion are antecedent to the death penalty.

=== Death Penalty India Report ===
The Death Penalty India Report (DPIR) by Project 39A at National Law University, Delhi which was released in May, 2016 contains the findings of the Death Penalty Research Project (DPRP). The DPIR contains quantitative information regarding the number of prisoners sentenced to death in India, the average duration they spend on death row, the nature of crimes, their socio-economic background and details of their legal representation, narratives of the prisoners on their experiences in police custody, through the trial and appeal process, incarceration on death row and impact on their families. 373 out of the 385 prisoners who were on the death row at the time and their families were interviewed. The project also documented accounts of prisoner experiences with the police investigation, access to legal representation, experience at the trial courts, life on death row, relationships with family through the years in prison, and other associated aspects. It found that 74.01% of the prisoners interviewed were economically vulnerable. It also found that a high percentage of prisoners sentenced to death had not completed their secondary education. Another major finding was that 76% of the prisoners belonged to a backward community. The Report also found that of over 1700 prisoners who were sentenced to death by trial courts in the period 2000–2015, the appellate courts ultimately confirmed only 4.5% of the sentences. Nearly 30% of the prisoners went from being sentenced to death to being acquitted of all charges while nearly 65% of the death sentences were commuted to life sentences.

=== Matters of Judgment ===
Matters of Judgment is an opinion study on the criminal justice system and the death penalty with 60 former judges of the Supreme Court of India. The study was conducted by Project 39A at the National law University, Delhi and was published in November 2017. The 60 former judges adjudicated 208 death penalty cases between them at different points during the period 1975–2016. The study was an attempt to understand judicial thought and adjudicatory processes that govern the administration of the death penalty within India's criminal justice system. Former judges were interviewed on main broad themes which included, investigation and trial processes, sentencing in death penalty cases, and judicial attitudes towards the death penalty. It was clear from the study that there is no uniform understanding of the requirements of the 'rarest of rare' doctrine which has led to the systemic issue of judge-centric sentencing.

=== Death Penalty Sentencing in Trial Courts ===
This study by Project 39A, National Law University, Delhi contains findings from a study of all capital cases decided by trial courts of Delhi, Madhya Pradesh and Maharashtra between 2000 and 2015. Analysing 215 judgments (43 from Delhi, 82 from Madhya Pradesh, and 90 from Maharashtra), the study demonstrates the normative and procedural gaps in death penalty sentencing framework that have been the legacy of the Bachan Singh v. State of Punjab, May 1980 judgment.

=== Death Penalty Annual Statistics Report ===
Since 2016, Project 39A at the National Law University Delhi annually releases a death penalty statistics report. The report covers movements in the death row population in India as well as political and legal developments in the administration of the death penalty and the criminal justice system. The 162 death sentences imposed by trial courts in 2018 is the highest in a calendar year since 2000. The number dropped to 102 in 2019.

== Executions since Independence ==
Prisons and other government departments don't have accurate records of the number of persons executed in India. An absolute lack of coordination among different official sources has hindered the collection of accurate data on the subject. Despite these limitations, Project 39A has attempted to curate a list of people executed in India. This number is, however, significantly lower than the actual number of people executed, as per data from the Law Commission of India's 35th Report which states a number above 1000 between the years 1947 to 1967.

This fact highlights broader issues with data collection in India's criminal justice system, as the country lacks comprehensive records of individuals who have been sentenced to death.

On 27 April 1995, Auto Shankar was hanged in Salem Central Jail at Salem, Tamil Nadu for murder of 6 people.

On 27 May 1997, Kamta Pasad Tiwary was hanged in Jabalpur Central Jail for raping and murdering an 8-year-old girl in 1991.

On 14 August 2004 at Alipore Central Jail, Dhananjoy Chatterjee was hanged for the murder (following a rape) of 18-year-old Hetal Parekh at her apartment residence in Bhowanipore, West Bengal on 5 March 1990. While the mercy petition of Chatterjee was pending before President A. P. J. Abdul Kalam, support for the rejection of the mercy petition as well as his execution was drummed up in West Bengal by various political groups and organizations. The mercy plea was rejected on 4 August 2004.

Before the execution of Ajmal Kasab due to his role in 26/11 terrorist attacks, people from across the globe wrote to President Pranab Mukherjee to inform his family and the public of the rejection of the mercy petition and about any scheduled date of execution. Kasab was hanged in secret on 21 November 2012 in Yerawada Central Jail.

Afzal Guru was convicted of conspiracy in connection with the 2001 Indian Parliament attack and was hanged on 9 February 2013 at Delhi's Tihar Central Prison. The Supreme Court of India upheld the sentence on 4 August 2005, ruling that the attack "shocked the conscience of the society at large." Afzal was scheduled to be executed on 20 October 2006, but the sentence was stayed.

Yakub Memon, convicted of 1993 Bombay bombings, was hanged in Nagpur Central Jail at Nagpur on 30 July 2015. On 21 March 2013 the Supreme Court confirmed Memon's conviction and death sentence for conspiracy through financing the attacks. On 30 July 2013 the Supreme Court rejected Memon's application for an oral hearing and dismissed his review petition by circulation. President Pranab Mukherjee rejected Memon's petition for clemency on 11 April 2014. Memon then filed a curative petition to the Supreme Court, which was rejected on 21 July 2015.

The four adult perpetrators Mukesh Singh, Akshay Thakur, Vinay Sharma and Pawan Gupta of the 2012 Delhi gang rape and murder case who survived the trial were hanged at 5:30 a.m. on 20 March 2020 at Tihar Central Prison in Delhi, after a lengthy legal battle.

=== List of offenders executed in the 21st century ===
Since 2000, eight executions have been carried out in India, all executions have been carried out by hanging.

5 executions (8 persons executed)
Executed person(s)	Nationality	Age	Sex	Date of execution	Place of execution	Victim(s)	President
Dhananjoy Chatterjee	Indian	39	M	14 August 2004	Alipore Central Jail, West Bengal	Hetal Parekh	A. P. J. Abdul Kalam
Ajmal Kasab	Pakistani	25	M	21 November 2012	Yerawada Central Jail, Maharashtra	2008 Mumbai terror attack victims	Pranab Mukherjee
Afzal Guru	Indian	43	M	9 February 2013	Tihar Central Jail, Delhi	2001 New Delhi Indian parliament attack victims	Pranab Mukherjee
Yakub Memon	Indian	53	M	30 July 2015	Nagpur Central Jail, Maharashtra	1993 Bombay bombing victims	Pranab Mukherjee
Mukesh Singh	Indian	32	M	20 March 2020	Tihar Central Jail, Delhi	Jyoti Singh	Ram Nath Kovind
Akshay Thakur	Indian	31	M	20 March 2020	Tihar Central Jail, Delhi	Jyoti Singh	Ram Nath Kovind
Vinay Sharma	Indian	26	M	20 March 2020	Tihar Central Jail, Delhi	Jyoti Singh	Ram Nath Kovind
Pawan Gupta	Indian	25	M	20 March 2020	Tihar Central Jail, Delhi	Jyoti Singh	Ram Nath Kovind

== See also ==
- Review petition
- Curative petition
- Mercy petition
- Capital punishment by country
- List of most recent executions by jurisdiction
- List of people executed in India
- List of methods of capital punishment
- Assassination of Mahatma Gandhi
- Assassination of Indira Gandhi
- Assassination of Rajiv Gandhi
