= Matamala =

Matamala is a surname. Notable people with the surname include:

- Jordi Matamala (born 1976), Spanish professional footballer
- Néstor Matamala, Chilean football manager
- Llorenç Matamala i Piñol (1856–1925), Spanish Catalan sculptor

== See also ==
- Matamala de Almazán, municipality located in the province of Soria, Castile and León, Spain
- Mamala
- Matala (disambiguation)
- Tamala (disambiguation)

Media related to Matamala (surname) at Wikimedia Commons
