= Guila =

- Location in Central African Republic
- Coordinates: 10°25′8″N 23°8′19″E
- Country: Central African Republic
- Prefecture: Vakaga
- Sub-prefecture: Birao
- Commune: Ridina

Guila is a village located in Vakaga Prefecture, Central African Republic.

== History ==
A group of herders attacked the local leader on 28 November 2023, prompting the villagers to flee to the surrounding localities. In September 2025, an armed group stormed the villages and burned houses, causing all the residents fled to either Am Dafok or Matala.
