= Delhi School of Management =

Public business school in Delhi, India

Delhi School Of Management
- Other names: DSM, DTU, DCE, DELTECH
- Motto: Work is Worship
- Type: Public business school
- Established: 2009; 17 years ago
- Parent institution: Delhi Technological University
- Academic staff: 14
- Postgraduates: 160 (full-time); 50 (executive)
- Doctoral students: 6
- Location: New Delhi, India; 28°44′59.81″N 77°7′1.30″E
- Campus: Urban, 163.9 acres (66.3 ha)
- Website: www.dtu.ac.in

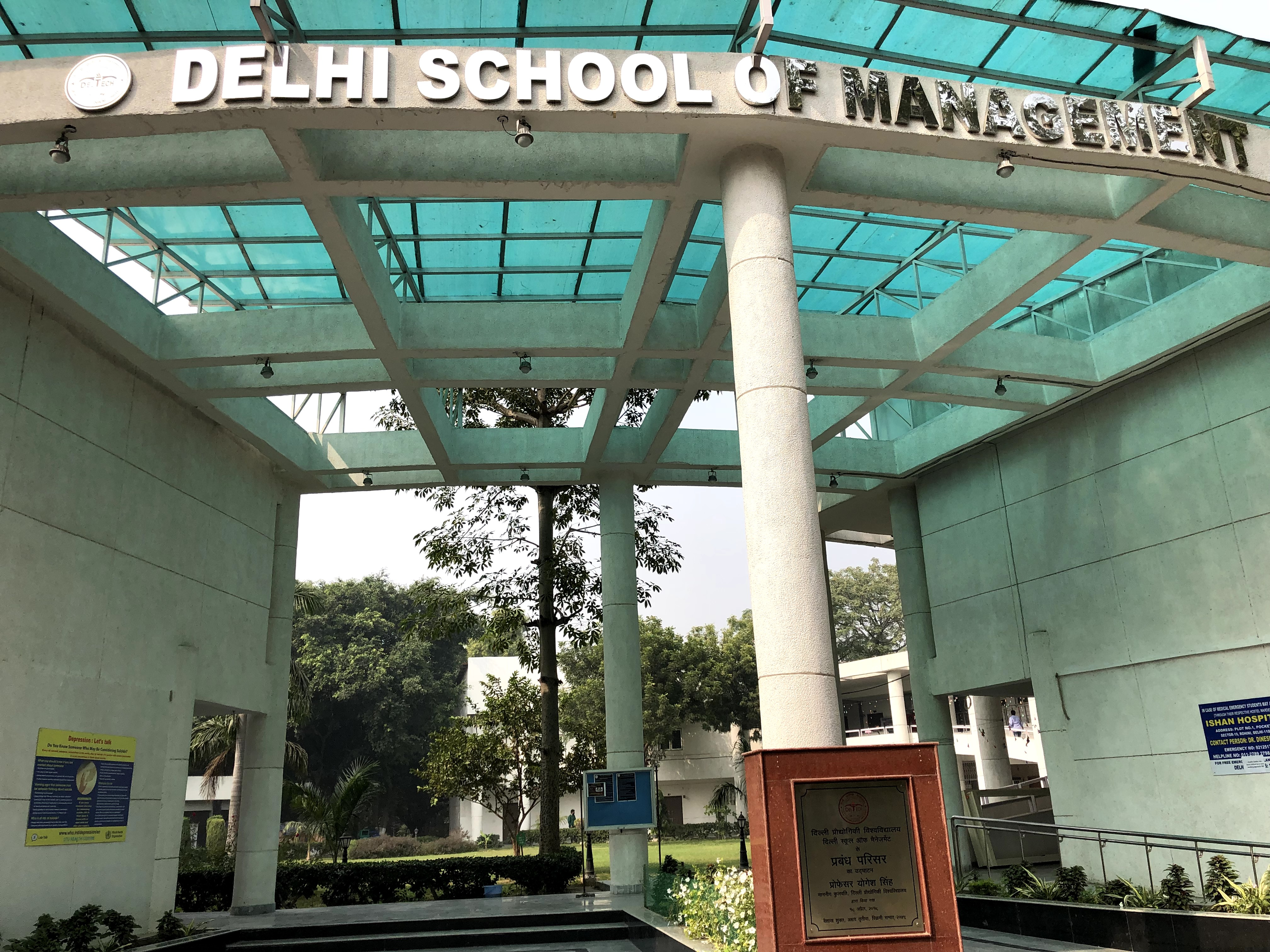
Delhi School of Management at DTU

Delhi School of Management (DSM) is a public business school under Delhi Technological University (formerly Delhi College of Engineering) in India. It offers two-year normal and executive Master of Business Administration (M.B.A) and Ph.D. degrees.

It was established in 2009 when its parent institution, Delhi College of Engineering (DCE) was upgraded to a state university with the name Delhi Technological University (DTU) under Act 6 of 2009 by Government of NCT of Delhi

== History ==
Delhi School of Management (DSM) was established in August 2009 with Delhi College of Engineering (DCE) acquiring a university status—being officially renamed as Delhi Technological University (DTU)—through a legislature passed by the Delhi State Assembly. Prof. P.B. Sharma, the then dean of DCE, was nominated as the university's first vice-chancellor. At that time, DTU introduced new courses in M.Tech., Ph.D. and B.Tech. programmes. MBA was introduced as a new programme in the newly established university.

== About Delhi Technological University ==
Delhi Technological University (DTU), formerly known as Delhi College of Engineering, was established in 1941 as Delhi Polytechnic and was under the control of the Government of India. The college has been under the government of the National Capital Territory of Delhi since 1963 and was affiliated to the University of Delhi from 1952 to 2009. In 2009 the college was given a state university status thus changing its name to Delhi Technological University. The university offers courses towards Bachelor of Engineering (B.E.), Bachelor of Technology (B-Tech), Master of Engineering (M.E.), Master of Science (M.Sc.), Doctor of Philosophy (Ph.D.) and Master of Business Administration (M.B.A) and contains 12 academic departments with a strong emphasis on scientific and technological education and research.

== Campus ==
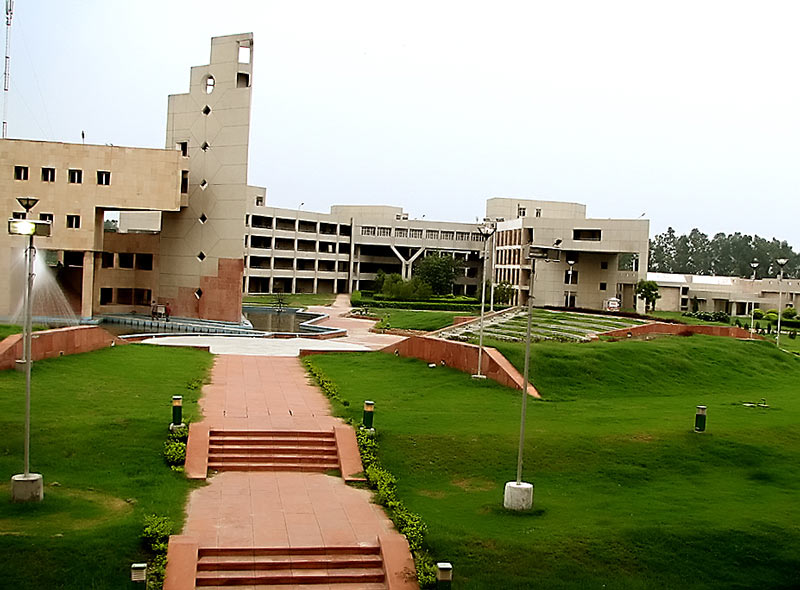
Computer Center, Placement Block and Science Block

Delhi College of Engineering operated from the Kashmiri Gate campus in the heart of Old Delhi until 1989, when construction began at the New Campus at Bawana Road in May. Moving of operations from Kashmiri Gate to Bawana Road began in 1995, and the new campus formally started instruction for all four years of study starting in 1999.

The new campus is well connected by road. It has a library, a centralized computer center, a sports complex, eight boys' hostels, three girls' hostels, and a married couples' hostel. The campus has residential facilities for faculty and staff.

Delhi School of Management was established in the same campus under the Mechanical Department.

== Admissions ==
The two-year MBA program offers specialization in Knowledge and Technology Management, Finance, Human Resource Management, Marketing, Supply Chain Management, and Information Technology Management. There are a total of 107 seats.

The eligibility is minimum 60% marks in B.E./B.Tech. in any branch of Engineering/ Technology OR Master's Degree in any branch of Physical/ Chemical/ Mathematical Science like Physics, Chemistry, Statistics, Computer Application, Electronic Science, Environmental Science, Operations Research, Computation/ Information Science OR Master's Degree in Commerce/ Economics.

Applications received are short-listed on the basis of performance in Common Admission Test (CAT) and qualifying exam. The short-listed candidates are required to appear for an interview and group discussion.

== Academics ==
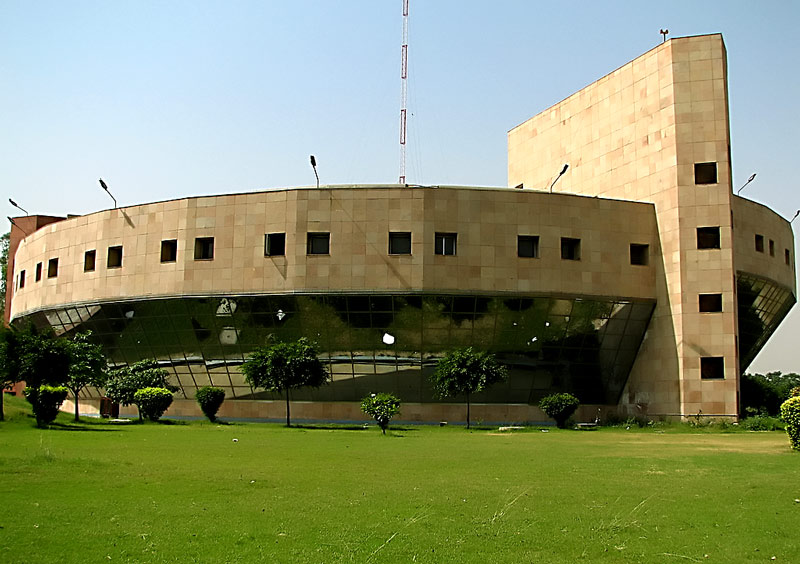
Library building

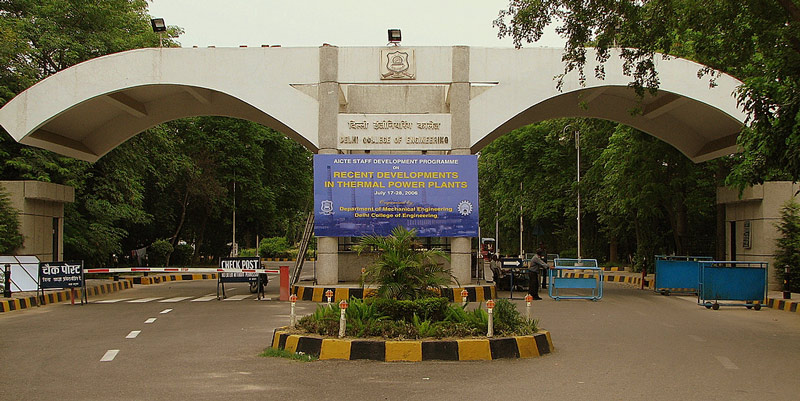
Main entrance to the campus

The course structure comprises four semesters that are taught over a period of two years. In the first year, 18 papers are conducted. Here the students are oriented with the fundamentals of HR, Finance, Marketing, Micro & Macroeconomics along with the various aspects of business like Corporate Law, Operations, Supply Chain, IT, Knowledge Technology, etc.

The second-year offers a plethora of opportunities wherein students can choose 2 specialization papers (1 from technical specification & other from functional specifications) from 6 avenues that are offered with 4 subjects per specializations along with corporate evolution, corporate governance, project management, international business environment & one foreign language.

In the third semester, the specializations offered are:

- Information Technology Management (ITM)
- Supply Chain Management (SCM)
- Knowledge and Technology Management (KTM)

In the fourth semester, the specializations offered are:

- Finance
- Human Resource
- Marketing

Additionally, students are required to complete an 8–10 weeks summer internship with a recognized business organization, working on assigned projects.
