= C. P. Udayabhanu =

- Born: 26 May 1959 (age 67); Mamala, Kerala
- Citizenship: Indian
- Occupation: Advocate
- Known for: Public Prosecutor
- Spouse: Adv. Thenrajam
- Children: Bharath Surya & Vandana Surya
- Parent(s): C.K. Padmanabhan & Santhamma Padmanabhan

C. P. Udayabhanu (born 26 May 1959 in Mamala, Kerala) is a well-known special public prosecutor. He had been appointed as the special public prosecutor in the controversial K. Chandrabose murder case and appeared as the defense lawyer in Sister Abhaya murder case. He was the script writer for the Malayalam movie Pakarnnattam. He is facing murder charges for the killing of realton Rajeev in 2017.

== Career ==
Enrolled as advocate on 13 July 1985. Started practice with Adv. Pius Kuriakose, who is presently the Lok Ayuktha. Thereafter started practice with veteran criminal lawyer T.V. Prabhakaran and started independent practice in 1987. From 1996 to 2013 appointed as special public prosecutor of Narcotics Control Bureau (NCB). 2001–2006: appointed as special public prosecutor of Central Bureau of Investigation (CBI). 2000 (till date) special public prosecutor of Directorate of Revenue Intelligence (DRI). appeared as public prosecutor in Vithura Sex Scandal Case. appeared as public prosecutor in Chandrabose Murder Case (Hummer car). Appeared as defense lawyer in Sister Abhaya murder case. And several other sensational cases. Story written by Udayabhanu was made into a movie by renowned director Jayaraj. 1983–87: participated in different agitations organized by DYFI and active member CITU Ernakulam district committee. President of different trade unions: OEN India Employees Union, KEL Employees Union. Member of disciplinary committee BAR counsel of Kerala. Column written in Mathrubhumi daily, Kala Kaumudhi weekly, active participant in discussion in TV channels regarding social and legal issues.

== Murder Charges ==
Adv Udhayabhanu was arrested in 2017 on murder charges for arranging the murder of realtor Rajeev. Adv Udhayabhanu was the seventh accused in the case. The police charged that Rajeev and Udhayabhanu had real estate dealings which went sour. Rajeev was kidnapped and forced to sign documents and this led to the murder. The case is pending trial while Udhayabhanu remains on bail.
