= Joseph Shine v. Union of India =

2018 landmark case decriminalising adultery

- Court: Supreme Court of India
- Decided: September 27, 2018
- Citation: AIR 2018 SC 4898; WP (Criminal) 194/2017

Case history
- Prior action: Referred from a three-judge bench to a five-judge Constitution Bench
- Subsequent action: Clarification on January 31, 2023, regarding applicability to Armed Forces

Court membership
- Judges sitting: Dipak Misra, R.F. Nariman, A.M. Khanwilkar, D.Y. Chandrachud, Indu Malhotra

Case opinions
- Four concurring opinions; Section 497 IPC struck down as unconstitutional

Keywords
- Adultery, Decriminalisation, Section 497 IPC, Gender Equality, Constitutional Law

Joseph Shine v. Union of India., AIR 2018 SC 4898, was a landmark judgement by the Supreme Court of India that decriminalised adultery by stricking down the Section 497 of Indian Penal Code. The ruling is known for recognising principles of equality, individual rights and autonomy, and extending sexual privacy to the fundamental right to privacy.

The judgement was delivered unanimously by a five-judge constitution bench consisting of Justices Dipak Misra, R. F. Nariman, A. M. Khanwilkar, D. Y. Chandrachud, Indu Malhotra on September 27, 2018. The court further clarified its order in 2023 that it did not apply to military personnel.

== Background ==
The core challenge in the case was the constitutional validity of the Section 497 of the Indian Penal Code (IPC) which criminalised adultery for married men with a maximum sentence of up to five years. Women were exempted from the prosecution as well as married men who engaged in sexual intercourse with unmarried women. Further, section 198(2) of Criminal Procedure Code, 1973 (CrPC) specified that only the aggrieved husband may file a complaint for the offence of adultery.

Section 497 of the Indian Penal Code, 1860

497. Adultery — Whoever has sexual intercourse with a person who is and whom he knows or has reason to believe to be the wife of another man, without the consent or connivance of that man, such sexual intercourse not amounting to the offence of rape, is guilty of the offence of adultery, and shall be punished with imprisonment of either description for a term which may extend to five years, or with fine, or with both. In such case the wife shall not be punishable as an abettor.

Joseph Shine, a non-resident Indian from Kerala, filed a public interest litigation under Article 32 of the Constitution challenging the constitutional validity of Section 497 IPC and Section 198(2) of the CrPC. The Government of India in its counter-affidavit opposed the challenge arguing to retain adultery as an offence to preserve the "sanctity of marriage."

== Judgement ==
The judgement was delivered on September 27, 2018, by a five-judge bench of Chief Justice Dipak Misra and Justices Rohinton Nariman, AM Khanwilkar, DY Chandrachud and Indu Malhotra. The bench held unanimously, in four concurring judgments, that the law was archaic, arbitrary and paternalistic, and infringed upon a woman's autonomy, dignity, and privacy. It struck down Section 497 of Indian Penal Code as well as Section 198(2) of the CrPC as unconstitutional, to the extent that it was applicable to Section 497.

However, the Court clarified that adultery remains a valid ground for divorce under civil law. It further held that if an act of adultery results in the aggrieved spouse committing suicide, the adulterous partner may be prosecuted for abetment of suicide under Section 306 of the IPC.

CJI Misra wrote on behalf of himself and Justice Khanwilkar. Justices Nariman, Chandrachud and Malhotra wrote separate concurring opinions.

=== CJI Mishra and Justice Khanwilkar ===
The court rejected the government's objection to protect and preserve the sanctity of marriage noting:

The sanctity of marriage can be utterly destroyed by a married man having sexual intercourse with an unmarried woman or a widow, as has been seen hereinabove. Also, if the husband consents or connives at such sexual intercourse, the offence is not committed, thereby showing that it is not sanctity of marriage which is sought to be protected and preserved, but a proprietary right of a husband. Secondly, no deterrent effect has been shown to exist, or ever to have existed, which may be a legitimate consideration for a State enacting criminal law.

== Exception for military personnel ==
In 2023, the Supreme Court further clarified its order on how it applied to the military personnel. The Government of India argued that military personnel were a "distinct class" under Article 33 of the Indian Constitution and subject to their own specific laws such as Army Act, 1950, for their conduct including adultery. The court upheld the government's stance allowing adultery to remain punishable for members of the armed forces.

== Significance ==
The decriminalisation of adultery is considered a landmark ruling in the Indian constitutional law and gender jurisprudence, particularly in its treatment of women and gender equality. It recognised autonomous rights of women, viewing Section 497 as violative of Articles 14 and 21 of the Indian Constitution, and overruled precedents in Yusuf Abdul Aziz vs. State of Bombay (1954 SCR 930), Sowmithri Vishnu v. Union of India ((1985) Supp SCC 137) and Vishnu Revathi vs. Union of India ((1988) 2 SCC 72). The ruling further reinforced the right to privacy, including sexual privacy, and personal autonomy under Article 21, aligning with the court's earlier ruling in K.S. Puttaswamy v Union of India (2017), which recognised privacy as a fundamental right.

== See also ==
- Right to Privacy verdict
- List of landmark court decisions in India
