= Am-Groumaye =

- Location in Central African Republic
- Coordinates: 10°23′9″N 23°1′50″E
- Country: Central African Republic
- Prefecture: Vakaga
- Sub-prefecture: Birao
- Commune: Ridina

Am-Groumaye, also written Amkroumay, Amkroumaï, Amkroumaye, Amgroumaye, Amgroumay, Amkourmaï, is a village situated 30 km from Birao in Vakaga Prefecture, Central African Republic.

== History ==
Some Am-Groumaye residents fled to the bush on 19 October 2022 due to a rumor of an armed group attack threat. On 27 July 2025, an alleged Sudanese bandit attacked the village, killing four people and injuring 10. The wounded civilians were treated in Birao hospital. In September 2025, Am-Groumaye was one of the villages that was attacked by armed groups, causing women, elders, and children to seek refuge in Matala. Due to the attack, only young people remained in the village.

== Agriculture ==
Watermelon is cultivated in Am-Groumaye.

== Education ==
There is a school in the village.
