= Casa Botines =

Coordinates: 42°35′53.82″N 5°34′14″W

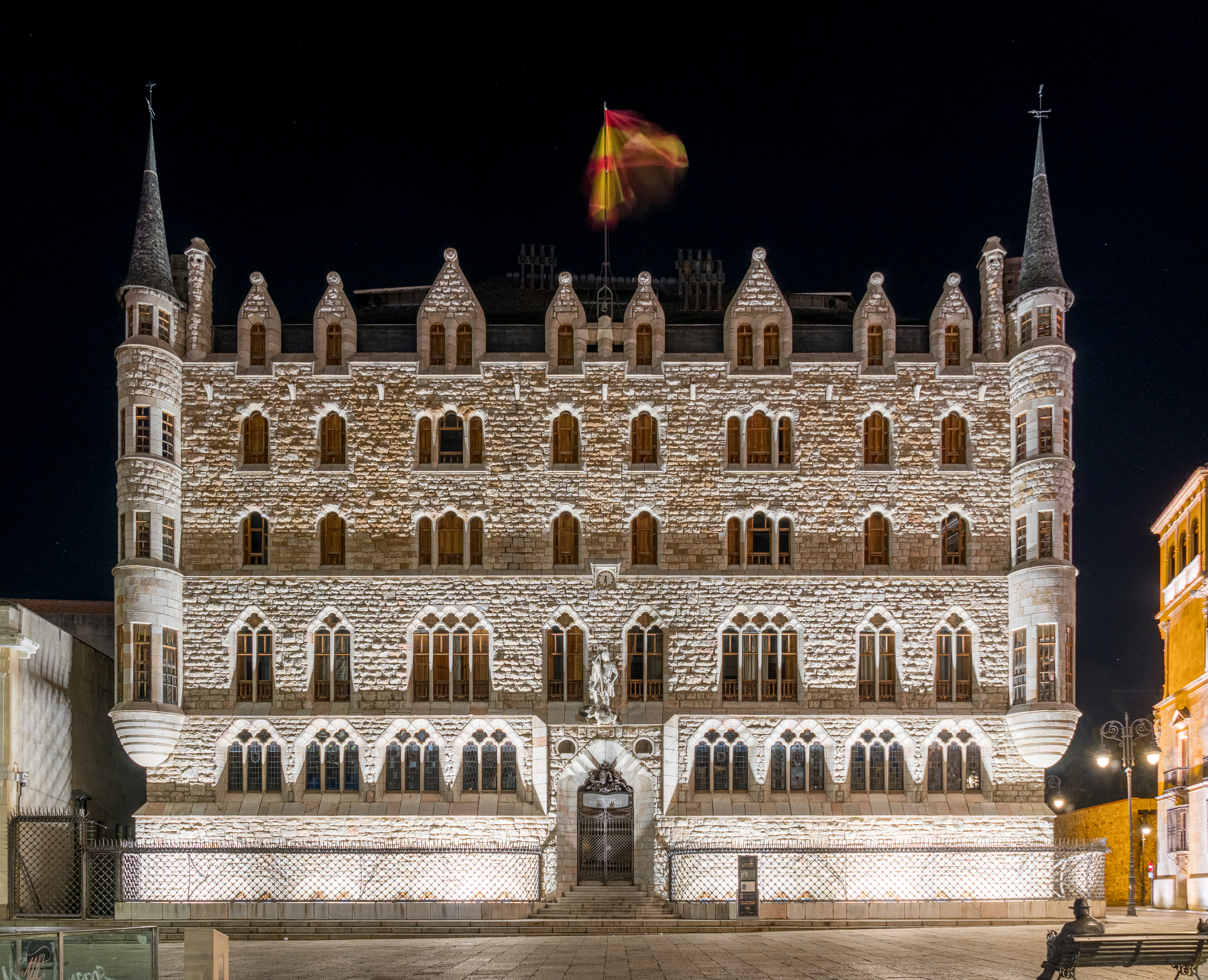

General information
- Architectural style: Modernisme
- Location: León, Spain

Design and construction
- Architect: Antoni Gaudí

Spanish Cultural Heritage
- Type: Non-movable
- Criteria: Monument
- Designated: 24 July 1969
- Reference no.: RI-51-0003826

The Casa Botines (built 1891-1892) is a modernista building in León, Spain designed by Antoni Gaudí. It currently houses a museum dedicated to Gaudi, Spanish art of the 19th and 20th centuries, and the history of the building itself.

After being built for a fabrics company, it was adapted to serve as the headquarters of a local savings bank (first Caja León, later Caja España).

== History ==
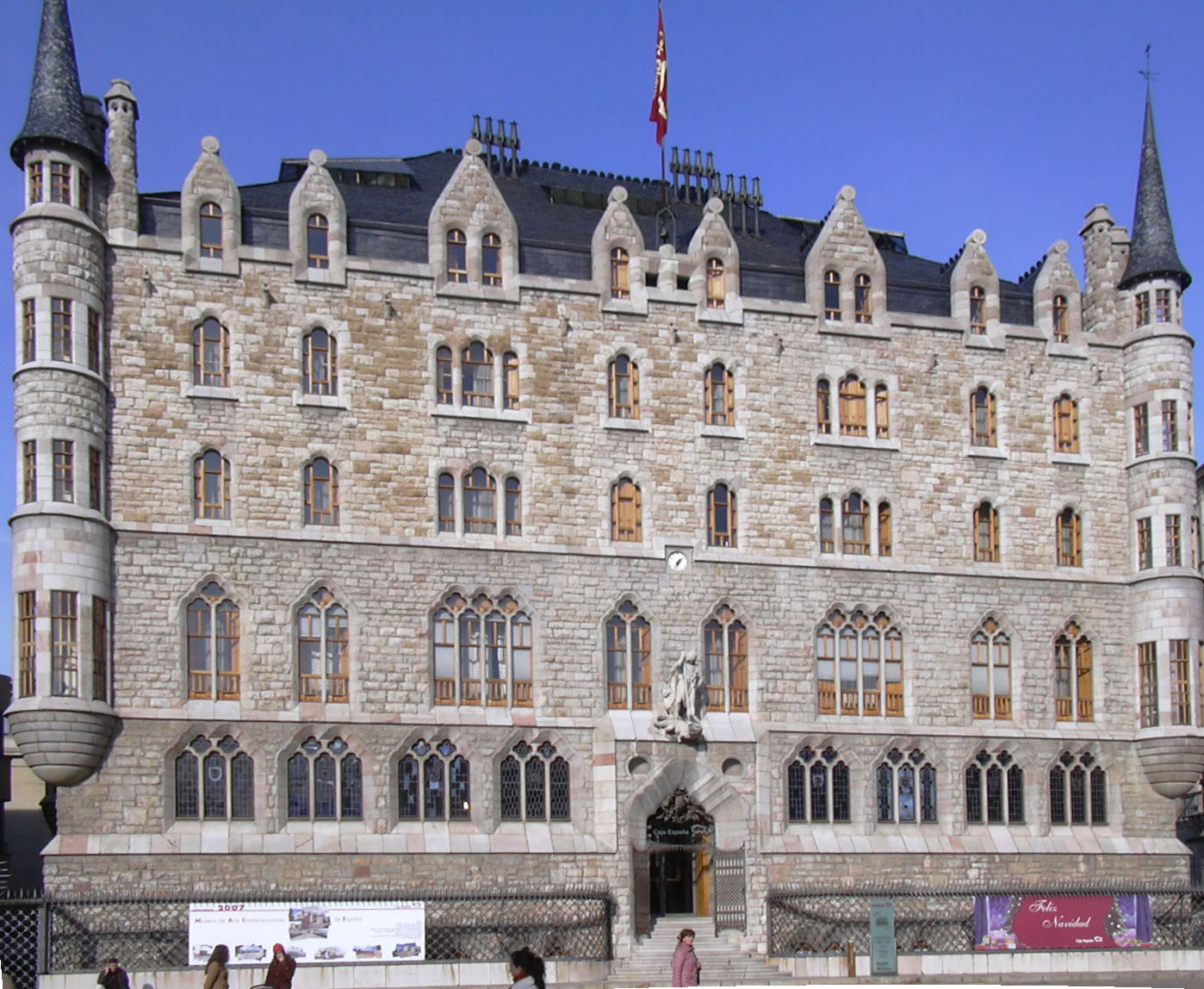
Part of the facade.

While Gaudí was finishing the construction of the Episcopal Palace of Astorga, his friend and patron, Eusebi Güell recommended that he build a house in the center of León. Simón Fernández and Mariano Andrés, the owners of a company that bought fabrics from Güell, commissioned Gaudí to build a residential building with a warehouse. The house's nickname comes from the last name of the company's former owner, Joan Homs i Botinàs.

In 1929, the savings bank of León, Caja España, bought the building and adapted it to its needs, without altering Gaudí's original project. In 2010 the bank merged with other similar institutions as part of Spain's response to the economic crisis.

== The building ==
With the Casa Botines, Gaudí wanted to pay tribute to León's emblematic buildings. Therefore, he designed a building with a medieval air and numerous neo-Gothic characteristics. The building consists of four floors, a basement and an attic. Gaudí chose an inclined roof and placed towers in the corners to reinforce the project's neo-Gothic feel. To ventilate and illuminate the basement, he created a moat around two of the façades, a strategy that he would repeat at the Sagrada Família in Barcelona.

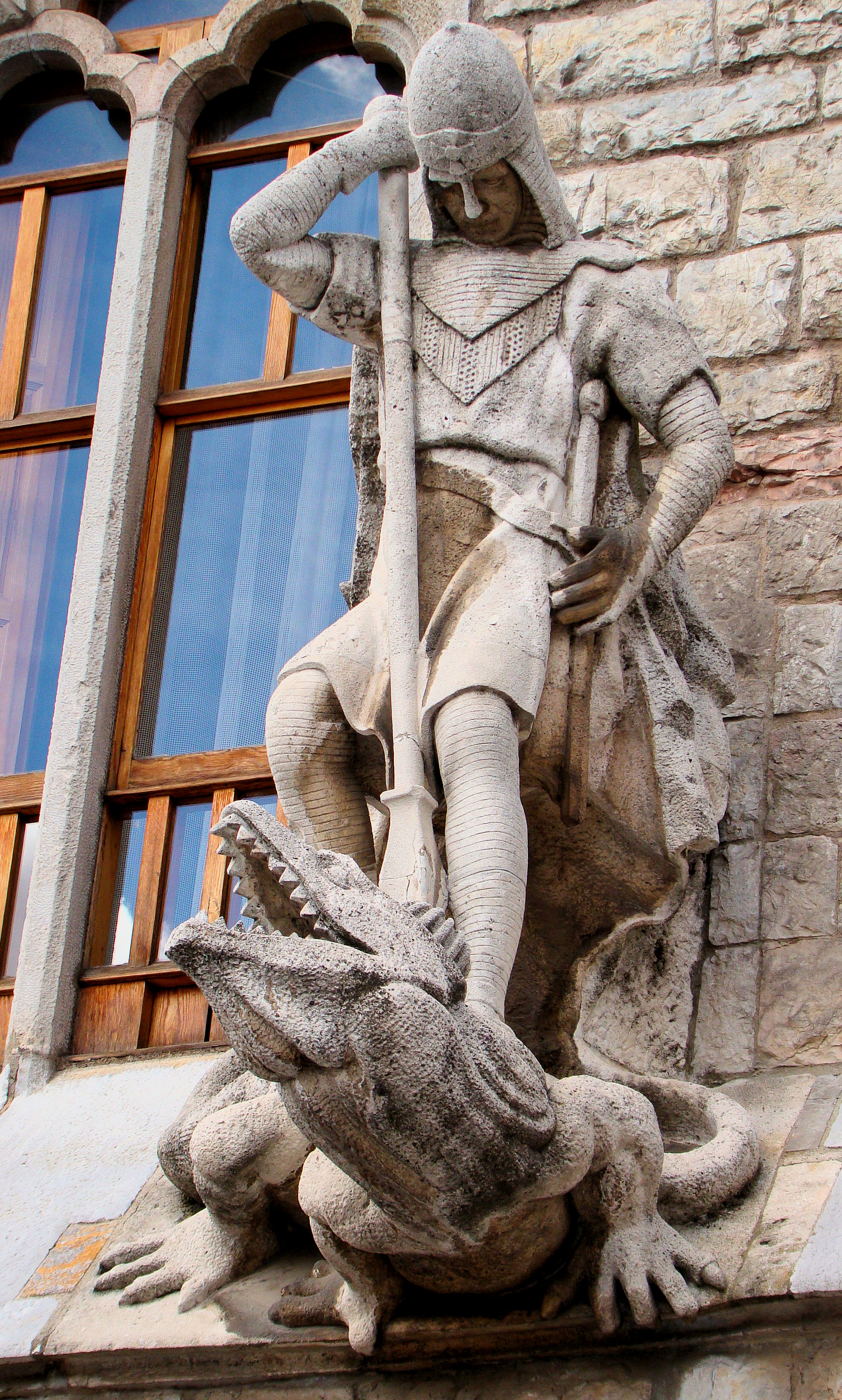
Sculpture showing Saint George slaying the dragon, executed by Llorenç Matamala i Piñol.

Gaudí placed the owners' dwellings on the first floor. These are accessed, respectively, by independent doors in the lateral and back façades. The upper floors house rental property and the lower floor contains the company offices. The building's principal entrance is crowned by a wrought iron inscription with the name of the company and by a stone sculpture of Saint George shown as he is slaying a dragon. During the restoration of the building in 1950, workers discovered a tube of lead under the sculpture containing the original plans signed by Gaudí and press clippings from the era.

The foundations of the Casa de los Botines were a subject of debate during the building's construction. Gaudí had envisioned a continuous base, like that of the city's cathedral. However, local technicians insisted on constructing on pilotis to make the floor, located at a great depth, more resistant. Despite rumors that the building would collapse during construction, the house has never had structural problems. On the ground floor, the architect used —for the first time— a system of cast-iron pillars in a frame structure, allowing for a more open plan, without the need for the load-bearing walls to distribute it. Also unlike Gaudí's previous projects, the façades of Casa de los Botines have a structural function.

On the inclined roof, six skylights supported by iron tie-beams illuminate and ventilate the attic. The ensemble is supported on a complex wooden framework.

== See also ==
- List of Gaudí buildings
