= Tamala =

Tamala may refer to:

People

- Evie Tamala (born 1969), Indonesian dangdut singer-songwriter
- Tamala Edwards (born 1971), American television news anchor and reporter
- Tamala Jones (born 1974), American actress
- Tamala Krishna Goswami (1946–2002), served on International Society for Krishna Consciousness's Governing Body Commission
- Tamala Shelton, also credited as Tamala, Australian actress

Places

- Tamala (inhabited locality), name of several inhabited localities in Russia
- Tamala Park, Western Australia, unpopulated locality within the City of Wanneroo in Perth, Western Australia

Other

- Tamala (plant), a genus of evergreen trees
- Tamala limestone, eolianite limestone deposits on the western coastline of Western Australia
- Tamala 2010: A Punk Cat in Space, a Japanese anime feature film
