= Ravi Kumar Diwakar =

Judge of the High Court of Allahabad

Hon'ble Justice Ravi Kumar Diwakar
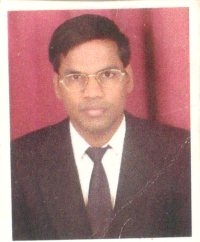
- Official portrait

Judge of the Uttar Pradesh Higher Judicial Service (HJS)
- Incumbent
- Assumed office 24 March 2017

Personal details
- Born: 5 July 1980 (age 46)
- Occupation: Judge
- Profession: Law

Ravi Kumar Diwakar (born 5 July 1980) is an Indian judge belonging to the Uttar Pradesh Higher Judicial Service (HJS). He currently serves as an Additional District and Sessions Judge (ADJ) heading a fast-track court in Muzaffarnagar, Uttar Pradesh.He recently made national headlines due to an unprecedented spree of capital punishment rulings and his outspoken remarks regarding judicial independence and pressure from criminal networks.

Quotation

"I would prefer to die, rather than be called a coward judge. As long as I am on the judge's chair, the authority to take decisions will be mine alone."

== Early life and education ==
Diwakar was born in Lucknow, Uttar Pradesh, India. He completed his undergraduate studies, earning a Bachelor of Commerce (B.Com.) degree, and subsequently pursued legal studies, obtaining a Master of Laws (LL.M.) degree.

== Recent Controversies & Case Transfers ==
- Mass Death Penalties

April and August 2026, Judge Diwakar sentenced 22 individuals to death across 10 different criminal cases. He categorized these severe trials under the legal threshold of the "rarest of rare" cases.
