= Matala =

Matala may refer to:

- Matala, Angola
- Matala, Central African Republic
- Matala, Crete
- Matala, Finland
- Matala, Lesotho
