= Government of NCT of Delhi v. Union of India =

Supreme Court of India landmark civil appeal ruling pronounced on 4 July 2018

- Court: Supreme Court of India
- Full case name: Government of NCT of Delhi v. Union of India & Anr.
- Argued: List: 2 November 2017; 8 years ago; 7 November 2017; 8 years ago; 8 November 2017; 8 years ago; 9 November 2017; 8 years ago; 14 November 2017; 8 years ago; 15 November 2017; 8 years ago; 16 November 2017; 8 years ago; 21 November 2017; 8 years ago; 22 November 2017; 8 years ago; 23 November 2017; 8 years ago; 28 November 2017; 8 years ago; 29 November 2017; 8 years ago; 30 November 2017; 8 years ago; 5 December 2017; 8 years ago; 6 December 2017; 8 years ago
- Decided: 4 July 2018; 8 years ago
- Citations: (2018) 8 SCC 501; C. A. No. 2357 of 2017; D. No. 29357-2016

Case history
- Prior action: Government of National Capital Territory of Delhi v. Union of India

Court membership
- Judges sitting: Dipak Misra, CJI; Arjan Kumar Sikri, J; Ajay Manikrao Khanwilkar, J; Dhananjaya Y. Chandrachud, J; and Ashok Bhushan, J

Case opinions
- Decision by: Dipak Misra
- Concurrence: D. Y. Chandrachud and Ashok Bhushan

Laws applied
- This case overturned a previous ruling
- Government of National Capital Territory of Delhi versus Union of India by Delhi High Court

Government of NCT of Delhi versus Union of India & Another [C. A. No. 2357 of 2017] is a civil appeal heard before the Supreme Court of India by a five-judge constitution bench of the court. The case was filed as an appeal to an August 2016 verdict of the Delhi High Court that ruled that the lieutenant governor of Delhi exercised "complete control of all matters regarding National Capital Territory (NCT) of Delhi", and was heard by the Supreme Court in November and December 2017.

The supreme court pronounced its judgment on 4 July 2018; it said the lieutenant governor of Delhi had no independent decision-making powers and was bound to follow the "aid and advice" of the Delhi chief-minister-headed council of ministers of the Government of Delhi on all matters except those pertaining to police, public order and land. The verdict was positively received almost unanimously by politicians from multiple parties.

== Background ==
The Government of India Act 1919 and the Government of India Act 1935 of the Parliament of the United Kingdom during the British rule in India classified Delhi as a chief commissioner's province, which meant Delhi was directly ruled by the governor-general through his or her representative, the chief commissioner. The chief commissioner of Delhi used to be an appointed civil servant and reported directly to the governor-general.

After India's independence and with the passing of the Government of Part C States Act, 1951, Delhi was classified as a Part C state, with an appointed chief commissioner and an elected chief minister-led council of ministers, which had powers over "public utilities, sanitation, water supply et al.", that was accountable and responsible to the Delhi Legislative Assembly. but not over 'police', 'public order', 'land' et al.

After the passing of the States Reorganisation Act, 1956 and the Constitution (Seventh Amendment) Act, 1956 on the recommendations of the Fazal Ali-headed States Reorganisation Commission, however, states were reorganised; tier-classification of states was abandoned and top-level subdivisions of India were categorised as either states or union territories (UT),. Delhi was classified a UT; its council of ministers and legislative assembly were dissolved. To give Delhi some elected leadership, the Municipal Corporation of Delhi Act, 1957 was passed by the parliament, establishing the now-trifurcated Municipal Corporation of Delhi. Delhi, however, did not come under the Government of Union Territories Act, 1961, which allowed for legislative assemblies and councils of ministers in some large union territories. There were widespread demands for Delhi to get statehood and more elected representatives in its general governance.

As a compromise, the Delhi Metropolitan Council was formed in 1966 with the passing of the Delhi Administration Act, 1966 by the Parliament of India; the council had fifty-six directly-elected members (called councillors) and five members nominated by the newly created position of lieutenant governor (LG). The council had only advisory powers with regards to legislative proposals, budget proposals and other matters referred to it by the lieutenant governor. The lieutenant governor succeeded the chief commissioner as the administrator of Delhi. The Delhi Metropolitan Council's chairman and deputy chairman acted as speaker and deputy speaker for the council, which elected a chief executive councillor and three executive councillors, much like a state chief minister and council of ministers elected by—and responsible to—vidhan sabhas.

After widespread demands for a legislative assembly, Delhi was granted further autonomy with the passing of the Constitution (Sixty-ninth Amendment) Act, 1991 and the Government of National Capital Territory of Delhi Act, 1991 by the parliament, which established the Delhi Legislative Assembly, allowing for the reintroduction of the chief minister and the council of ministers, replacing the chief executive councillor and executive councillors, respectively.

== Premise ==
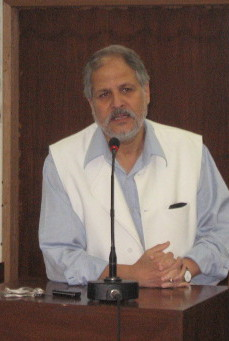
Najeeb Jung, the lieutenant governor of Delhi from July 2013 to December 2016

In April 2015, the Delhi lieutenant governor (LG) Najeeb Jung said it was not mandatory for him to send files regarding police, public order and land—his reserved subjects—to the chief minister's office. Jung was backed by the Ministry of Home Affairs in May 2015 which through a government notification said the LG had the final decision on matters related to police, public order, land and services, adding that the Delhi Anti-Corruption Branch (ACB) could not investigate central government employees.

In June 2015, while presenting the Delhi budget for approval to the Delhi Legislative Assembly, the deputy chief minister Manish Sisodia—acting as the finance minister—announced the government's intention to raise circle rates on agricultural land throughout the National Capital Territory of Delhi. In August 2015, Lieutenant Governor Jung opposed the government's move on circle rates and stayed it. In response, the Delhi government reasserted its intention to raise the circle rate, saying the LG had no say on the matter and was bound to follow the government's aid and advice.

In August 2015, the Delhi government ordered the creation of a commission of inquiry headed by retired Delhi High Court judge, S. N. Aggarwal to investigate the alleged CNG fitness scam that occurred during the chief ministership of Indian National Congress member Sheila Dikshit. The move was opposed by Jung, who referred the matter to the Ministry of Home Affairs, asking whether it was legal for the government to form a commission of inquiry without his approval. The home ministry later ruled that the Government of National Capital Territory of Delhi was "not the competent authority to set up" an inquiry commission, thus holding that the Delhi government order was "legally invalid and void ab initio".

In December 2015, the Delhi government formed a one-member commission of inquiry composed of former solicitor general, Gopal Subramanium to investigate an alleged scam in the Delhi & District Cricket Association. Lieutenant Governor Jung asked for the Government of India's opinion on the legality of the inquiry commission. Chief Minister Kejriwal maintained that the commission of inquiry was legal and asked the Government of India to move the Delhi High Court if it had any issue with the commission's formation. In January 2016, the Ministry of Home Affairs informed Jung that the commission was not valid because the Delhi government did not have the power to form an inquiry commission because Delhi was not a state.

In August 2016, at the Delhi government's behest, a division bench of the High Court of Delhi composed of Chief Justice G. Rohini and Justice Jayant Nath ruled that the LG had "complete control of all matters regarding National Capital Territory of Delhi". The court also pronounced that all commissions of inquiry set up by the Government of Delhi were illegal, it also ruled that directions issued by the government to the Delhi Electricity Regulatory Commission and the directors nominated by it to the boards of private electricity companies were illegal. Further, the court upheld the May 2015 Ministry of Home Affairs notification which ruled that the Delhi ACB could not investigate central government employees. The court, however, said the LG was bound by the aid and advice of the Delhi council of ministers on matters related to the appointments of special public prosecutors. Not satisfied with the high court's decision, the Delhi government ministers Kejriwal, Sisodia and Satyendra Jain decided to move the supreme court.

=== Civil servants ===
In May 2015, after the Delhi chief secretary and Indian Administrative Service (IAS) officer K. K. Sharma went on leave for ten days, Lieutenant Governor Jung ordered Shakuntala Gamlin, IAS officer and principal secretary in charge of Delhi government's departments of power and industries, to officiate as the chief secretary in Sharma's absence. This was opposed by Kejriwal, who accused Gamlin of lobbying for power companies. Gamlin wrote to LG Jung that industries minister Satyendra Jain was putting pressure on her in a matter related to industrial plots.

Anindo Majumdar, the Delhi government's principal secretary for its services department and IAS officer, was locked out of his office on the direction of the chief minister's office; the order added that Majumdar had been replaced by Kejriwal's principal secretary and IAS officer, Rajendra Kumar, and that Majumdar had been divested of all of his charges. The order, however, was declared null and void by Lieutenant Governor Jung, saying his approval for transferring Majumdar was not taken. Majumdar subsequently said he opposed the "politicisation" of senior bureaucratic appointments and refused to follow any "unconstitutional" orders from Kejriwal.

In June 2015, seven officers of the Bihar Police joined Delhi ACB on deputation; in opposition to the move, Lieutenant Governor Jung said the ACB was solely under his jurisdiction, resulting in the officers not being assigned any tasks for months. This was followed by Jung naming Indian Police Service (IPS) officer M. K. Meena, an inspector general-ranked Delhi Police joint commissioner heading its New Delhi range, as the ACB's head. This was in contravention to Kejriwal's demands; Kejriwal had appointed deputy inspector general-ranked IPS officer S. S. Yadav as the ACB chief. In June 2015, the Delhi High Court refused to set aside Meena's appointment but asked him to act in "accordance with law". Consequently, the Delhi government reduced Meena's mandate, asking him to look after training and cases undergoing trial. Yadav was asked to handle—among other things—investigations and functioning of the agency.

On 9 June 2015, Jung vetoed Kejriwal's transfer of IAS officer Dharam Pal from the Delhi government's principal secretary in charge of its home and land and buildings departments, citing the April 2015 home ministry notification that transferred the power over services to the LG.

In August 2016, following the Rajender Prashad v. Govt. of NCT of Delhi decision of the Delhi High Court, the Delhi government-appointed Indian Revenue Service officer Tarun Seem, and a former engineer-in-chief of the PWD Sarvagaya Srivastava—non-IAS secretaries in charge of health and PWD respectively—were replaced by Jung with IAS officers Chandraker Bharti and Ashwani Kumar as principal secretaries for health and PWD, respectively. The move was opposed by Kejriwal, who said that deputy chief minister, Manish Sisodia, had "begged" Jung to not transfer health and PWD secretaries before March 2017. Kejriwal added that files for the transfer of bureaucrats were not shown to him or any other minister of the government. In response, Jung's office said Seem and Srivastava's postings were illegal because they were in contravention with the Government of India's cadre rules, adding that even posting Seem to a position in the Delhi government was illegal because the LG's approval to post him was not taken.

In October 2016, Jung gave IAS officer Alka Diwan the additional charge of being the Delhi Commission for Women's (DCW) member-secretary. Diwan proceeded to stop salary payments to contractual employees of the DCW and asked the commission's chairperson Swati Maliwal to regularise contractual employees by sending a proposal to the Delhi government's finance department. This led to Kejriwal asking Jung to remove her. Jung then replaced Diwan with another IAS officer Dilraj Kaur, conflicting with the wishes of Kejriwal, who had nominated the commission's legal adviser P. P. Dhal to act as the DCW's officiating member-secretary. This caused Kejriwal to compare Jung with Adolf Hitler.

In February 2018, Delhi's chief secretary and IAS officer Anshu Prakash was allegedly assaulted by some members of the Delhi Legislative Assembly (MLA) from the AAP. In response, the AAP released a statement saying Prakash said he was answerable to the LG and not MLAs or the CM; the statement also said Prakash had "used bad language against some MLAs and [had] left without answering any questions".

== Proceedings ==
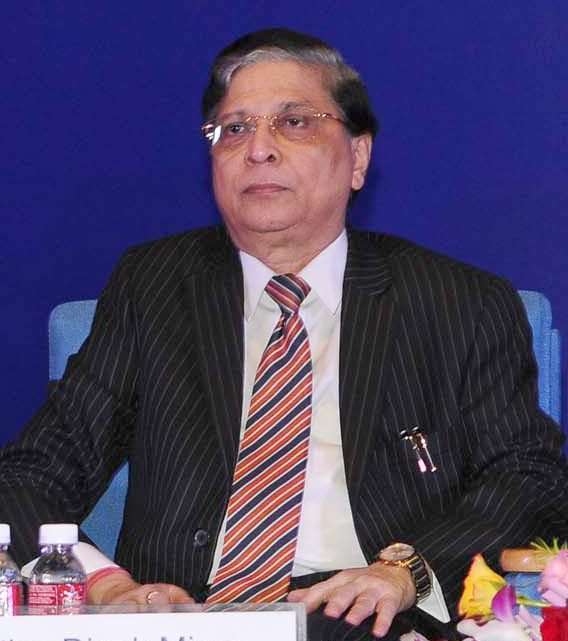
Chief Justice of India, Dipak Misra was a member of the five-judge constitution bench that presided over Government of NCT of Delhi v. Union of India & Another

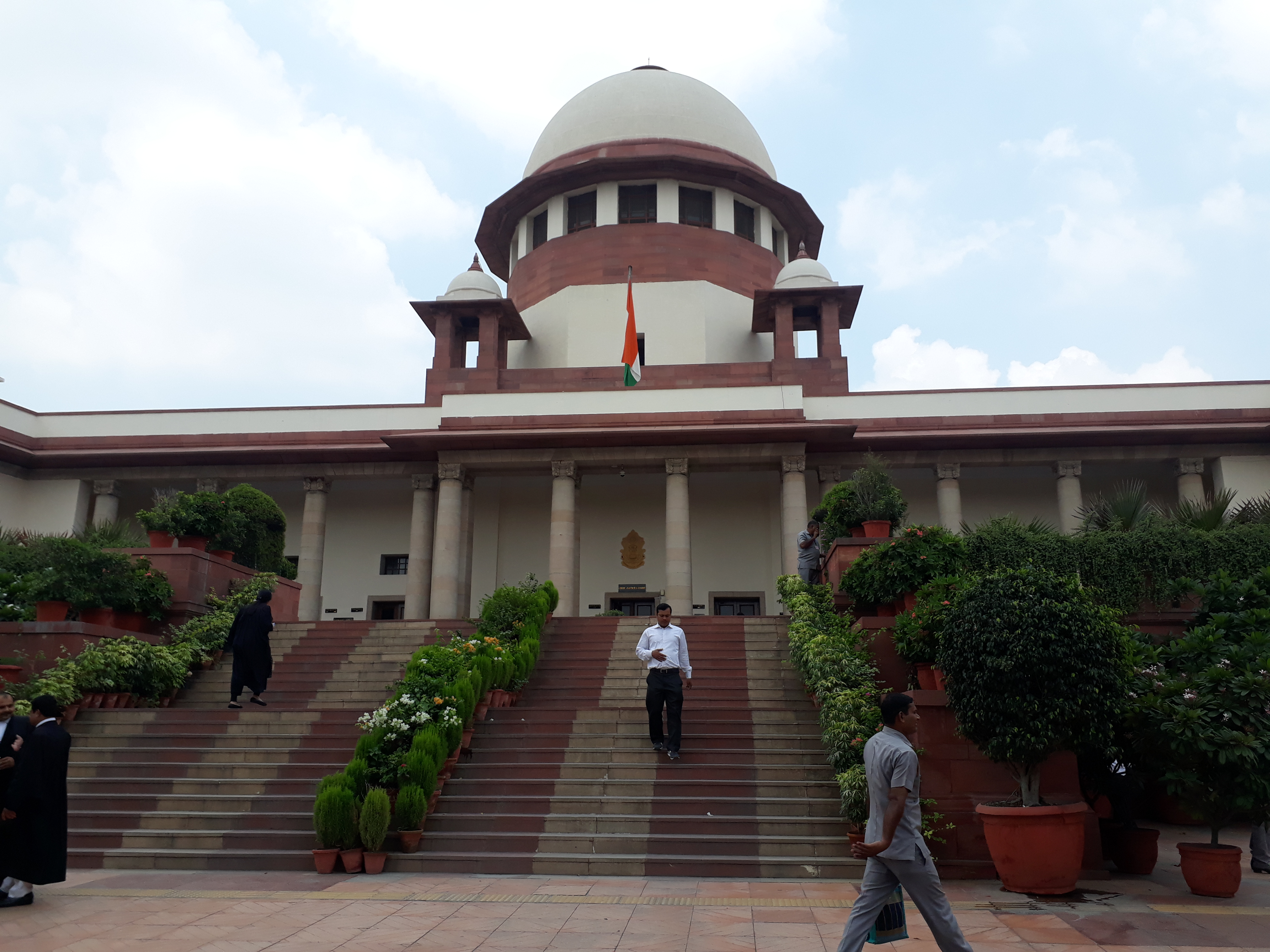
Building of the Supreme Court of India

In 2017, the supreme court heard arguments for fifteen days, beginning on 2 November 2017 and finishing on 5 December 2017. On 6 December 2017, the court reserved its verdict on the matter.

The Government of India (GoI) was represented by additional solicitor general Maninder Singh and former additional solicitor general and senior advocate Sidharth Luthra. The Government of National Capital Territory of Delhi (GNCTD) was represented by Indian National Congress member, former union minister and senior advocate P. Chidambaram, former solicitor general and senior advocate Gopal Subramanium, senior advocate Satya Mitra, former additional solicitor general and senior advocate Indira Jaising, senior advocate Rajeev Dhavan and senior advocate Shekhar Naphade.

For GNCTD, Chidambaram argued that Delhi's lieutenant governor was not like a viceroy but just the president's representative and that his or her powers were dependent on the president's pleasure. Chidambaram also argued that per the Government of National Capital Territory of Delhi Act, 1991, the LG was "required to act on the aid and advice" of the council of ministers of the Delhi government. Subramanium argued that the Delhi government was not debating the parliament's supremacy but said the legislative assembly also had "elbow room" in Delhi's governance, adding that the LG was misusing the powers assigned to his or her office to refer differences of opinion to the president. He also said the LG's extraordinary discretion was to be used in exceptional circumstances and not in day-to-day governance of Delhi and that the chief secretary and other officers did not exercise volition on the government's welfare schemes and proposals but simply used them to mechanically defer matters for the lieutenant governor's disposition.

For the GoI, Singh argued that the Delhi government's role was limited to that of municipal governance, backing his argument up by saying the Delhi, Andaman and Nicobar Islands Civil Service and the Delhi Fire Service came under the GoI's jurisdiction rather than that of the Delhi government's. Singh also said that because Delhi did not have its own public service commission, it was not a state. Singh also argued that the GNCTD's executive powers were not binding on the lieutenant governor. Singh also said that because the Article 239AA of the Constitution of India came under the section for union territories, Delhi was a union territory.

While hearing the case, the supreme court said Delhi's lieutenant governor had more powers than state governors, who were supposed to generally follow the aid and advice of the state chief minister-led council of ministers.

== Judgment ==
The supreme court ruled that according to the Article 239AA of the Indian constitution, although the government had to keep him or her informed of its decisions, Delhi's lieutenant governor had no independent decision-making powers and had to follow the aid and advice of the chief-minister-led council of ministers of the Government of Delhi on matters the Delhi Legislative Assembly could legislate on, viz., all items on the State List (items on which only state legislatures can legislate) and the Concurrent List (items on which both the Parliament of India and the state legislatures can legislate) barring police, public order and land. The court added that on matters referred to him/her, the LG was bound to follow the orders of the president.

Although the court ruled that the lieutenant governor still had the right to seek the president's opinion in case of a disagreement between him/her and the government, the president—who is bound by the aid and advice of the prime minister-headed Union Council of Ministers—would be the final authority in case of a conflict, with his or her opinion being binding on both the LG and the Delhi government, it cautioned the LG to use this power only in exceptional circumstances and not in a "routine or mechanical manner". The court, however, did not define what "trivial" differences in opinion meant.

The court also ruled that "[t]here is no room for absolutism and there is no room for anarchism also" in the governance of the National Capital Territory of Delhi.

At the same time, the supreme court—citing the report of the Balkrishnan Committee of 1987—ruled that although having a special status, Delhi was not a state; hence, unlike state governors, Delhi's lieutenant governor was not a mere constitutional figurehead but also bore the title of administrator.

== Reactions ==
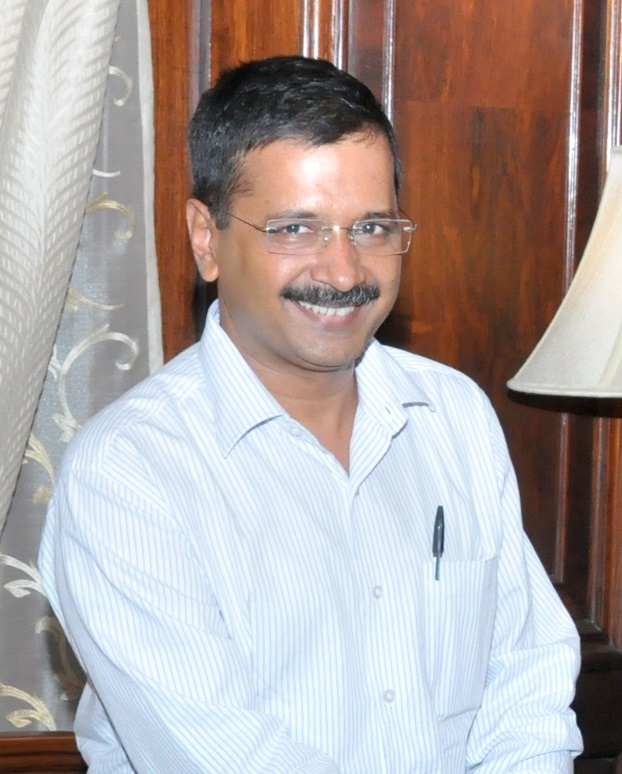
Delhi's chief minister, Arvind Kejriwal, called the judgment a "big victory" for the people of Delhi and democracy

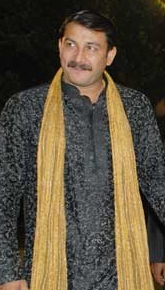
Member of the Lok Sabha for North East Delhi, Manoj Tiwari, asked Chief Minister Kejriwal to stop spreading anarchy "start following [the] constitution"

Arvind Kejriwal, Aam Aadmi Party (AAP) convener and chief minister of Delhi welcomed the verdict and said on his Twitter account the ruling was a "big victory" for democracy and the people of Delhi. AAP member, Delhi's deputy chief minister and minister of finance and education Manish Sisodia said, "[o]n behalf of the people of Delhi I [sic] thank the hon'ble Supreme Court wholeheartedly. The people's chosen government can now take decisions for the people of Delhi." Sisodia also said the supreme court verdict "did not leave any chance for misinterpretation".

National Democratic Alliance's largest constituent the Bharatiya Janata Party (BJP) said the opposite; one of its spokespersons Sambit Patra said the court verdict "upheld the constitution" and was "a decision against anarchy". Delhi BJP president and member of the Lok Sabha (House of the People) for North East Delhi Manoj Tiwari asked Kejriwal to stop spreading anarchy and "start following [the] constitution". A nominated member of the Rajya Sabha (Council of the States) and BJP member Subramanian Swamy said that while the lieutenant governor had to follow Delhi government's decisions, he or she could still oppose any "anti-national security or ant-constitutional decision" of the government and labelled its political leadership a group of "Naxalite type [sic] people".

Three-time Delhi chief minister Sheila Dikshit, a member of the Indian National Congress (INC), the largest constituent party of the United Progressive Alliance, said, "[i]f the Delhi government and the lieutenant governor (LG) don't work together then [sic] Delhi will face problems". An INC spokesperson and a senior advocate, Abhishek Singhvi said the supreme court ruling was good "in principle", adding that there was no reason for the lieutenant governor to exercise discretion beyond his or her three reserved powers.

Communist Party of India (Marxist) general secretary and politburo member Sitaram Yechury said there was no reason for governors and lieutenant governors to "usurp the rights of elected" governments, and that powerful governors and lieutenant governors appointed by the centre were in contravention with the constitution's federal structure. Former attorney general and a supreme court advocate Soli Sorabjee said the supreme court judgment was "good" and that the lieutenant governor and the Delhi government had to "work harmoniously", adding that regular confrontation between the two was "not good for democracy".
