= Competent authority =

Legal term

A competent authority is any person or organization that has the legally delegated or invested authority, capacity, or power to perform a designated function. Similarly, once an authority is delegated to perform a certain act, only the competent authority is entitled to take accounts therefrom and no one else.

Borrowing authority when the services of a certain class of individuals are entrusted to one of the authority other than the appointing authority, the former will be the borrowing authority. Borrowing Authority will be authorised to look into the performance of individuals with respect to the task so assigned to them.

Borrowing authority, service conduct when it appears to the borrowing authority the conduct of the individuals not in accordance with the standard prescribed, it will move in writing to the appointing authority the conduct so observed with the evidence so brought on record for proceedings therein.

Appointing authority, however, is not competent to proceed against the individual without such sort of complaint in writing by the authority which delegated the task. Such proceedings if so initiated without any formal complaint will be coram non judice.

Based on the Basel Convention, it is any national agency responsible under its national law for the control or regulation of a particular aspect of the transportation of hazardous materials (dangerous goods). The term appropriate authority, as used in the International Civil Aviation Organization (ICAO) Technical Instructions, has the same meaning as competent authority.

== See also ==
- Agency law
- Fiduciary duty
- Government of NCT of Delhi v. Union of India
