= Tamala (inhabited locality) =

Tamala (Russian: Тамала) is the name of several inhabited localities in Russia.

Urban localities

- Tamala, Penza Oblast, a work settlement in Tamalinsky District, Penza Oblast
