= Section 326B of the Indian Penal Code =

Indian law on attempted acid attacks

The Section 326 B in the Indian Penal Code lays down the punishment for attempted acid attacks. The minimum punishment is 5 years' imprisonment. It can extend up to 7 years' imprisonment with fine. A separate law to punish offenders in such cases was passed along with amendment of law on sexual offences. Such a legislation in line with the laws in other countries like Bangladesh was demanded by various sections of the society for a long time.

== Text ==
326B: Whoever throws or attempts to throw acid on any person or attempts to administer acid to any person, or attempts to use any other means, with the intention of causing permanent of partial damage or deformity of burns or maiming or disfigurement or disability or grievous hurt to that person, shall be punished with imprisonment of either description for a term which shall not be less than five years, but which may extent to seven years and also be liable to fine.

Explanation 1.- For the purposes of section 326A and this section, "acid" includes any substance which has acidic or corrosive character or burning nature, that is capable of causing bodily injury leading to scars or disfigurement or temporary or permanent disability.

Explanation 2.- For the purposes of section 326A and this section, permanent or partial damage or deformity shall not be required to be irreversible.'.

== See also ==
- Section 326A of the Indian Penal Code
