= Llorenç Matamala i Piñol =

Spanish Catalan sculptor

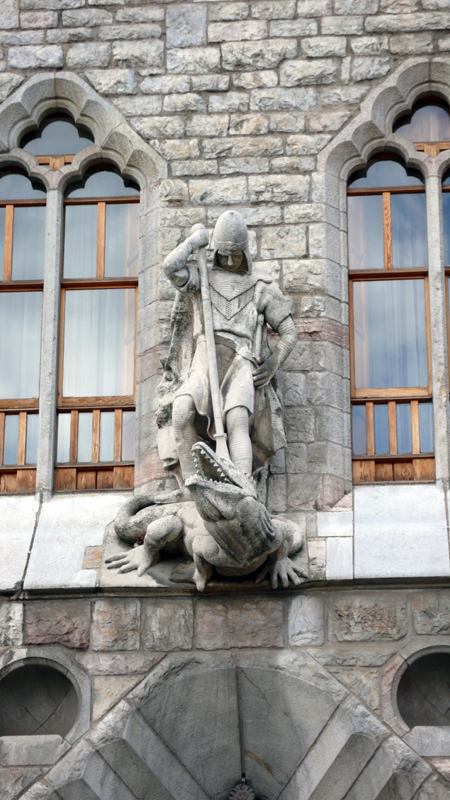
St. George Killing the Dragon in the Casa de los Botines.

Llorenç Matamala i Piñol (1856–1925) was a Spanish Catalan sculptor.

Matamala was born in Vila de Gràcia, a quarter of Barcelona. He collaborated with sculptor Joan Flotats on the sculpture decoration of the Parc de la Ciutadella. He was also a friend and collaborator of architect Antoni Gaudí, working together on the Parc de la Ciutadella. They also collaborated with him in the decoration of the Sagrada Família and the Casa de los Botines.

His son, Joan Matamala i Flotats, was also a sculptor.

Matamala died in Barcelona in 1925.
