= Review petition =

Legal procedure in India

In India, a binding decision of the Supreme Court/High Court can be reviewed in review petition. The parties aggrieved on any order of the Supreme Court on any apparent error can file a review petition. Taking into consideration the principle of stare decisis, courts generally do not unsettle a decision, without a strong case. This provision regarding review is an exception to the legal principle of stare decisis.

Article 137 of the Constitution provides that subject to provisions of any law and rule made under Article 145 the Supreme Court of India has the power to review any judgement pronounced (or order made) by it. Under Supreme Court Rules, 1966 such a petition needs to be filed within 30 days from the date of judgement or order. It is also recommended that the petition should be circulated without oral arguments to the same bench of judges that delivered the judgement (or order) sought to be reviewed.

It is not necessary for the court to accept every review petition. Court may accept review petition only if it is filed on sufficient grounds which are:

1. The discovery of new and important matter or evidence which, after the exercise of due diligence was not within his knowledge or could not be produced by him at the time when the decree was passed or order made
2. On account of some mistake or error apparent on the face of the record
3. Any other sufficient reason

Furthermore, even after dismissal of a review petition, the SC may consider a curative petition in order to prevent abuse of its process and to cure gross miscarriage of justice.

While a civil review petition can be moved in accordance with Order XLVII, Rule 1(1) of the Code of Civil Procedure, 1908 a criminal review petition can be moved only on the ground of an error apparent on the face of the record. (Source: CPC, 1908 and CRPC, 1973)

== Prominent cases ==
=== Dowry harassment case ===
IPC 498a review-On 23 April 2018, the Supreme Court heard arguments and reserved its judgement on a review petition filed against an earlier order of the Court which had outlawed immediate arrests under this provision of IPC 498a.On 14 September 2018, it set aside the earlier judgement and left it to the parliament to enact suitable guidelines.

=== 2G spectrum case ===
On 2 March 2012, Govt of India filed a review petition in Supreme Court seeking partial review of the court's 2 February 2012 order which had quashed 122 licenses. The Govt questioned Supreme Court's authority over ruling against the first-come first-served policy but stayed away from challenging the cancellation of 122 licences issued during the tenure of A Raja as Telecom Minister. On the same day Sistema, majority shareholder in MTS India, too filed a review petition in Supreme Court. The Supreme Court on 4 April 2012 accepted to hear Government's review petition on limited grounds and dismissed all other 10 review petitions. Later on the Government of India applied for the withdrawal of the review petition and same was accepted by the Supreme Court of India

=== NEET Case ===
On 18 July 2013, a 3-judge division bench of the SC by a 2:1 majority verdict had quashed National Eligibility Cum Entrance Test for admission to undergraduate medical/dental courses and Postgraduate medical/dental courses. The government of India subsequently filed a review petition. The Supreme Court agreed to hear the review petition on 23 October 2013. It recalled the 18 July order on 11 April 2016 and allowed the government to conduct NEET for admission to Undergraduate and Postgraduate medical and dental courses in the meantime. It decided to hear afresh on the validity of NEET. Another 3-judge bench of the Supreme Court after a fresh hearing upheld NEET by its judgement dated 29 April 2020.

=== Vodafone-Hutchison Tax Case ===
On 17 February 2012, Govt of India moved the Supreme Court seeking a review of its verdict holding that the Indian Income Tax Department does not have jurisdiction to impose Rs.11,000 crore as tax on the overseas deal between Vodafone and Hutchison. On 20 March 2012, SC dismissed the review petition during an in-chamber proceeding saying the petition has no merit.

=== Mayawati disproportionate assets case ===
On 4 October 2012, based on a review petition filed by a person named Kamlesh Verma, the Supreme Court decided to review its earlier verdict in open court in a disproportionate assets case against Mayawati. The case dates back to 2003 when CBI filed a case against Mayawati for owning assets disproportionate to her known sources of income. Mayawati described the CBI investigation against her as illegal. The assets case was finally quashed on 6 July 2012—nine years later—by the Supreme Court; the court found that the case was unwarranted. The CBI decided not to file an appeal.

== See also ==
- Curative petition
