= Section 326A of the Indian Penal Code =

The Section 326 A in the Indian Penal Code lays down the punishment for acid attacks. The minimum punishment is 10 years' imprisonment. It can extend up to life imprisonment with fine. A separate law to punish offenders in such cases was passed along with amendment of law on sexual offences. Such a legislation in line with the laws in other countries like Bangladesh was demanded by various sections of the society for a long time.

== Text ==
326A: Whoever causes permanent or partial damage or deformity to, or burns or maims or disfigures or disables, any part or parts of the body of a person or causes grievous hurt by throwing acid on or by administering acid to that person, or by using any other means with the intention of causing or with the knowledge that he is likely to cause such injury or hurt, shall be punished with imprisonment of either description for a term which shall not be less than ten years but which may extend to imprisonment for life, and with fine:

Provided that such fine shall be just and reasonable to meet the medical expenses of the treatment of the victim:

Provided further that any fine imposed under this section shall be paid to the victim.

Explanation 1. – For the purposes of ... this section, "acid" includes any substance which has acidic or corrosive character or burning nature, that is capable of causing bodily injury leading to scars or disfigurement or temporary or permanent disability.

Explanation 2. – For the purposes of ... this section, permanent or partial damage or deformity shall not be required to be irreversible.

== See also ==
- Section 326 B of the Indian Penal Code
