= Mohammed Nisham =

Businessman turned criminal from Kerala

- Born: Thrissur, Kerala, India
- Occupations: Businessperson, Managing Partner of Kings Beedi Co.
- Criminal charges: Murder
- Criminal status: Convicted
- Children: Ishaan Nisham

Mohammed Nisham A A is businessman and convicted criminal, notable for the K Chandrabose murder case and is currently lodged in a prison in Kerala, India after he was convicted. He is from Muttichoor, a town near Padiyam and the Kurumali River in Thrissur district in Kerala. Nisham is primarily into tobacco and real estate businesses. He is the managing partner of Kings Beedi Co., based in Thirunelveli, Tamil Nadu, a company founded by his late father, Adakkaparambil B Abdulkader. Apart from being a prominent tobacco supplier, he has hotel and jewellery businesses in the Middle East.

== Family ==
Mohammed Nisham is the son of Adakkaparambil B Abdulkader and Subaida Muhammad. Mohammed Nisham has two brothers - elder brother Abdul Nizar A A and younger brother Abdul Rasak A A. Mohammed Nisham has 1 sister Dilshana Noushad. Mohammed Nisham is married. Mohammed Nisham has a son Ishaan Nisham.

== Controversies ==
He is a notorious businessman turned-out criminal who was charged under many criminal cases in Kerala and Karnataka States. Kerala government has charged him under KAPA (Kerala Anti-Social Activities (Prevention)Act, 2007). Nisham has been in the public eye for a series of transgressions he committed.

In 2013, he had allowed his son Ishaan Nisham, then nine-year-old, to drive his Ferrari in their residential complex in Thrissur, leading to a police case. In the same year he was arrested after he detained a woman police inspector, T Devi, in his car, during a routine traffic inspection. Nisham was under the influence of alcohol. He started arguing, saying no police station in Kerala was good enough to park his vehicle. To prevent him from driving away, Devi got into the car to take out the keys. At this point, Nisham, who was outside, locked the doors with his remote control, trapping her inside. More policemen arrived and it was only after a heated argument that Nisham let her out.

== K Chandrabose murder case ==
On 2015 January 29 Thursday, Mohammed Nisham is convicted for driving his Hummer SUV into his guard Chandrabose at Sobha  City residential township, pinning him against the wall, before attacking him with a metal rod. Chandrabose, aged 50, suffered multiple injuries and despite repeated surgeries, died at the Amala Institute of Medical Sciences Thrissur, after spending two weeks on life support.

Nisham supposedly attacked Chandrabose because he was slow in opening the gate to his apartment in Kerala. Police had charged Nisham with attempted murder following the attack in Thrissur city. He was arrested on the charge of attempted murder leading to death. After a year of multiple sessions in court, on 20 January 2016, he was found guilty and was sentenced with a life term by Thrissur District Additional Sessions Court on the next day (21 January 2016). As per the verdict he will have to spend 38 years in jail for multiple crimes. Criminal lawyer Advocate Raman pillai appeared for Nisham and Special Public Prosecutor Advocate C P Udayabhanu appeared for Chandrabose. The Verdict was issued by Thrissur District Additional Sessions Judge Mr K P Sudeer. Earlier the Supreme Court of India had rejected his bail plea, saying the case was "an example of how the rich have become entirely egocentric and megalomaniacs". The Thrissur District Additional Sessions Court on Thursday, 21 January 2016, sentenced businessman Mohammed Nisham (38) to life term and an additional 24 years of imprisonment for murdering his security guard.

Recently he has been in the news for having a personal helper in jail alluding to vip treatment where he is serving his term. DIG prisons is investigating the issue. Earlier, a controversy had erupted over Nisham's stay in jail as on one journey back from court, he was filmed treating his police escorts to a lavish meal, following which five policemen were suspended. Meanwhile, a quick probe has been ordered as it is believed that a nexus between Nisham and police officers exist, giving him access to run his business.

=== Notable fact ===
1. Adv. B. Raman Pillai appeared as the defence lawyer for the accused Mohammed Nisham in Chandrabose murder case.
2. Adv. C. P. Udayabhanu, who was appointed as the special public prosecutor in Chandrabose murder case by the government, argued Chandrabose murder case in the court for the family of murder victim Chandrabose and the government (against Mohammed Nisham).
3. In 2008, both Adv. B. Raman Pillai (who later became defence lawyer for Mohammed Nisham in Chandrabose murder case) and Adv. C.P. Udayabhanu (who later became the special public prosecutor in Chandrabose murder case and argued Chandrabose murder case against Mohammed Nisham) had appeared at the same time as defence lawyers for the accused in Sister Abhaya murder case. In Sister Abhaya murder case, Adv. B. Raman Pillai appeared as defence lawyer for Fr. Kottoor and Adv. C. P. Udayabhanu appeared as defence lawyer for Fr. Puthrukkayil.
4. Chandrabose murder took place in 2015.
