= Gopal Subramanium =

Senior advocate in the Supreme Court of India

Solicitor General
- In office 15 June 2009 – 14 July 2011
- Preceded by: Goolam Essaji Vahanvati
- Succeeded by: Rohinton Fali Nariman

Additional Solicitor General
- In office 2005–2009

Personal details
- Born: 1957 or 1958 (age 68–69)
- Citizenship: Indian
- Children: 2
- Education: Hansraj College, Delhi; Faculty of Law, University of Delhi
- Occupation: Lawyer

Gopal Subramanium (born c. 1958) is an Indian lawyer, international arbitrator, academic and Senior Advocate who practices primarily in the Supreme Court of India and the Delhi High Court. He has served as the Solicitor General of India from 2009–2011 and Additional Solicitor General of India from 2005–2009. Moreover, he has also served as Chairman of the Bar Council of India from 2010–2011.

== Early life and education ==
Subramanium was born in Bengaluru, Karnataka. He studied at St. Xavier's School, Delhi. He did his B.Sc. (Hons.) degree at Hansraj College, Delhi. He then completed his degree in Law from the Faculty of Law, University of Delhi.

== Legal career ==
=== Early career ===
Subramanium started his career with Shardul S. Shroff in Delhi in 1980. He appeared as counsel for the states of Madhya Pradesh and Uttar Pradesh, often traveling to these states for hearings.

He then worked under D. P. Wadhwa, who rose to become a judge of the Supreme Court, and later under former Attorney General Soli Sorabjee.

In May 1993, Subramanium was designated a Senior Advocate (the equivalent of a King's Counsel in the UK) suo motu by the Supreme Court, one of the youngest in the Supreme Court's history. His varied experience includes:

- Acting as counsel (in 1991–1992) to a judicial commission headed by Justice J. S. Verma (then a judge of the Supreme Court) to inquire into security lapses leading to the assassination of former Prime Minister of India, Rajiv Gandhi.
- Acting (in 1993) as "prosecuting counsel for the Central Bureau of Investigation (CBI)" in the trial of persons accused of setting off a series of bomb blasts in Bombay. He acted as CBI's counsel in this matter till 2012 when appeals were heard by the Supreme Court.
- Acting as a special commissioner appointed by the Supreme Court in 1994–1995 to investigate into allegations on wrongful detention of persons in mental hospitals in the State of Assam.
- In 2001, he was appointed as counsel to a judicial commission headed by former Supreme Court judge Justice K. Venkataswamy, to inquire into sting operations carried out by a news publication to expose corruption in defence procurement transactions.
- Acting as the Special Public Prosecutor in the prosecution of accused of the terrorist attack on the Indian Parliament in 2001.

Between 2005 and 2009, Subramanium held the office of Additional Solicitor General of India, before being appointed Solicitor General in 2009.

=== Solicitor General of India ===
Subramanium served as Solicitor General of India 2009–2011. During his tenure he also served as the Chairman of the Bar Council of India. As a senior law officer to the Government of India, he represented the Government as lead counsel in a wide range of matters involving complex questions of constitutional and criminal law.

Notable cases while Solicitor General of India include:

- Acting as the Special Public Prosecutor in the prosecution of Ajmal Kasab, the sole surviving terrorist of the 2008 Mumbai attacks.
- Acting as lead counsel for the Union of India in the matter of Ashoka Kumar Thakur v. Union of India, wherein he defended state-sponsored reservations for Other Backward Classes of persons in India.
- Acting as lead counsel for the Government of India in 2010–2011 in litigation concerning irregularities in allocation of 2G radio-spectrum bandwidth to various private telecom operators.
- Acting as lead counsel for the Union of India in 2006 in the matter of Raja Ram Pal v. Speaker, where he successfully defended a contempt of privilege action taken by the Speaker of Parliament against certain members of Parliament, who were found guilty of raising questions in Parliament for illegal monetary gratification.
- Acting as amicus curiae to the Supreme Court in 2011 in the matter of Bachpan Bachao Andolan v. Union of India, where he presented a report on the realities of trafficking of children in India and assisted the Supreme Court in framing guidelines to deal with trafficking.

=== Resignation as Solicitor General ===
In 2011, Subramanium chose to resign from his position as Solicitor General in protest of the government's decision to field a private lawyer, Rohinton Fali Nariman, in a telecommunications case before the Supreme Court. In July 2011, the Ministry of Law and Justice appointed Nariman as the Solicitor General of India for a period of three years.

Supreme Court judgments in a black money case in which the court directed constitution of a Special Investigation Team (SIT) and the one declaring appointment of Special Police Officers as unconstitutional (in the Salwa Judum case) were seen as the last straw for the exit of Subramanium.

Subramanium said he will never take the job of Solicitor General again because it defies convention. Former corporate lobbyist Nira Radia described Subramanium as "a very upright person" in a 2009 conversation with Ratan Tata, which emerged as a part of the leaked Radia tapes.

=== Legal work 2011–2015 ===
Subramanium assisted the Supreme Court as Amicus curiae in many cases, including Sohrabuddin Sheikh fake encounter case.

Subramanium has appeared in a number of landmark cases concerning the law of arbitration in India, including the BALCO case (2012), where the Supreme Court of India ruled on the applicability of Part I of the Indian Arbitration & Conciliation Act, 1996, to arbitrations held in a foreign seat, and awards arising therefrom, and Sundaram Finance (1999) (in respect of a court's powers to grant interim protection to parties pending arbitration).

In 2013, he represented Novartis AG as lead counsel, along with T. R. Andhyarujina, in the case Novartis v. Union of India & Others, the pharmaceutical company's challenge before the Supreme Court to a denial to grant it an Indian patent for the cancer drug Glivec.

In the same year, Subramanium acted as a member of a Committee to Recommend Amendments to Criminal Laws, headed by Justice J. S. Verma, which recommended much-needed amendments to various Indian laws to ensure the safety and dignity of women and young children.

In 2014, Subramanium was mentioned in list of four people recommended by the collegium for appointment as Supreme Court judges. He withdrew his candidature following media reports which said the Central Government was objecting to his appointment because of his alleged links with corporate lobbyist Nira Radia.

In 2015, Subramanium appeared for business tycoon Mohammed Nisham, for his bail plea in the Supreme Court of India. The businessman was accused of running over a security guard with his Hummer SUV over a delay in opening the gates of his apartment. On October 9, 2015, the SC bench led by Justice Dipak Misra dismissed the arguments of senior advocate Gopal Subramanium, who appeared for Nisham.

In 2015, Subramanium argued for greater literary and artistic freedom in the case Devidas Ramachandra Tuljapurkar v. State of Maharashtra.

=== Legal work 2016–present ===
Subramanium successfully led arguments on behalf of the Government of Delhi in a case concerning the constitutional division of powers between the Delhi Government, the Union Government, and the Lieutenant Governor of Delhi.

In 2017, Gopal acted as lead counsel for the Petitioners in Justice K.S. Puttaswamy (Retd.) v. Union of India where a nine-judge bench of the Supreme Court of India unanimously held that there was a fundamental right to privacy under the Indian Constitution.

In 2017, he represented Japan's Daiichi Sankyo in enforcement proceedings before the Delhi High Court for a US$550 million ICC award with the seat at Singapore.

Between 2016 and 2019, Subramanium assisted the Court as Amicus Curiae in the case BCCI v. Cricket Association of Bihar on the implementation of the Justice Lodha Committee recommendations.

In 2019, he served as a member of the arbitral tribunal presided over by Justice R.S. Pathak, former Chief Justice of India and Judge, International Court of Justice in arbitration between Transammonia AG and MMTC Limited.

In May 2020, he became the first Indian Senior Counsel to appear before the Singapore Supreme Court.

In the same year, he appeared as senior counsel for Amazon in the Future Retail-Amazon case.

In 2021, Subramanium was called to the Bar of England and Wales at Gray's Inn.

In October 2021, Subramanium was appointed an Honorary Fellow at the British Institute of International and Comparative Law.

== Additional activity ==
During his period as Chairman of the Bar Council of India, Subramanium is credited with introducing the All India Bar Examination, a mandatory test for law graduates to be eligible to practice in India.

Subramanium's arbitration experience includes appearing as lead counsel for Indian companies in ICC and domestic arbitrations. In addition, he also deposes as an expert witness on Indian law in SIAC and other international commercial arbitrations.

He has appeared in a number of matters in the Supreme Court and various High Court concerning arbitrability of disputes, appointment of arbitrators and challenge to arbitral awards including those arising out of defence contracts, EPC contracts and infrastructure contracts.

Subramanium is a Supplementary Judge of the Qatar International Court and Dispute Resolution Centre, as well as an Honorary Bencher at Gray's Inn, London. He is also an associate member of the prestigious barrister's chambers, 3 Verulam Buildings.

== Academia ==
Subramanium is an academic and scholar whose work primarily concerns legal philosophy, writing on democracy, social inequality, civic education, and the applicability of psychology to legal concepts.

He is also a psychologist and sociologist, who has long been involved in the research into mental health disorders including clinical depression, Alzheimer's, and schizophrenia.

In August 2020, Subramanium founded the Subramanium Study Centre in Oxford. Located at the Prince of Wales International Centre for SANE Research, it hosts interdisciplinary research, academic, and legal work. The Centre seeks to advance the understanding of mental health disorders by “bringing together experts from a variety of fields and providing a foundation for inter-disciplinary collaboration.”

Among his other scholarly works, Subramanium has contributed to, and edited, "Supreme But Not Infallible: Essays in Honour of the Supreme Court of India", a comprehensive work on the evaluation of the working of the Supreme Court of India, published in 2004 by the Oxford University Press.

Subramanium is a visiting professor at the University of Delhi. He is a frequent lecturer and speaker on law, primarily in the UK and India. He has given speeches at both the University of Oxford and the University of Cambridge. In 2013, he gave a lecture at the Center on the Legal Profession at Harvard University.

In October 2021, Subramanium was inducted into the Chancellor's Court of Benefactors at the University of Oxford by Chris Patten.

== Philanthropy ==
Subramanium is a benefactor of Somerville College, University of Oxford, where he supports the postgraduate studies of students from India. In 2019, he was made a Foundation Fellow of the college.

At Somerville, he endowed the Gopal Subramanium Scholarships, in honour of his teacher Shri. Bharati Tirtha, which funds the postgraduate study of Indian legal policy. He also supported Somerville's choir on their tour of India in 2018.

Subramanium is a Classical Music Patron at London's Southbank Centre, an Ambassador of mental health charity SANE, and Honorary Director of the All India Heart Foundation.

== Awards and accolades ==
During his tenure as a law officer, Subramanium was honoured with the National Law Day Award for Outstanding Jurist, presented to him in 2009 by the President of India, for his consistent professional excellence and adherence to the highest traditions of the Bar.

Subramanium's duties came to the fore at one of India's largest corporate litigation, by appearing on behalf of the Union of India and defended its interests in the gas dispute between Reliance India Ltd. and Reliance Natural Resources Ltd. before the Supreme Court.

He was Special Public Prosecutor on the high-profile murder case of Jessica Lal, remaining conciliatory towards the strategic angles of the case as it involved the Indian National Congress . He was instrumental in conducting "National Consultation for Strengthening the Judiciary towards Reducing Pendency and Delays" and facilitated the incorporation of a Special Purpose vehicle, "Society for Delivery of Justice and Legal Reform".

In 2013, he was awarded an honorary Doctorate in Law by the Central University of Orissa, Koraput for his contributions to the development of law in India.

Senior counsel and noted jurist, Fali Nariman described Subramanium as a very competent advocate and lauded the introduction of bar exams, an initiative undertaken by Subramanium.
