= Curative petition =

Final review in the Supreme Court of India

The Curative Petition is the last chance available for the protection from the compensation of injustice in the court after the review petition is dismissed or has been exhausted. It is a concept that evolved by the Supreme Court of India in the matter of Rupa Ashok Hurra vs. Ashok Hurra and Anr. (2002) in which the question was whether an aggrieved person is entitled to any relief against the final judgement or order of the Supreme Court after the dismissal of a review petition. The Supreme Court held that to prevent abuse of its process and to cure gross miscarriage of justice, it may reconsider its judgements in exercise of its inherent powers. For that purpose, the court has devised what has been termed as a curative petition in which the petitioner is required to aver specifically that the grounds mentioned therein had been taken in the review petition filed earlier and that it was dismissed by circulation, which must be certified by a senior advocate. The curative petition is then circulated to the three most senior judges and to the judges who delivered the impugned judgement if available. No time limit is given for filing curative petition. It is guaranteed under Article 137 of Constitution of India, which gives the power to the Supreme Court to review of its own judgements and orders.

The main difference between the review petition and curative petition is the fact that review petition is inherently provided in the constitution of India whereas the emergence of the curative petition is in relation with the interpretation of the review petition by the Supreme Court which is enshrined in article 137.

== Requirements ==
To entertain a curative petition, the Supreme Court has laid down specific conditions:

1. The petitioner must establish that there was a genuine violation of principles of natural justice and fear of the bias of the judge and judgement that adversely affected him.
2. The petition must state specifically that the grounds mentioned had been taken in the review petition and that it was dismissed by circulation.
3. The curative petition must accompany certification by a senior lawyer relating to the fulfillment of the above requirements.
4. The petition is to be sent to the three senior most judges and judges of the bench who passed the judgement affecting the petition, if available.
5. If the majority of the judges on the above bench agree that the matter needs hearing, it is sent to the same bench if possible.
6. The court may impose "exemplary costs" to the petitioner if his plea lacks merit.

== See also ==
- Review petition
