= Army Act, 1950 =

Parliament of India
- Long title: An Act to consolidate and amend the law relating to the Government of the regular Army.
- Citation: Act No. 46 of 1950
- Enacted by: Parliament of India
- Enacted: 20 May 1950
- Commenced: 22 July 1950; 31 January 1963 (Goa, Daman and Diu); 1 October 1963 (Pondicherry); 1 July1965 (Dadra and Nagar Haveli)

Amended by
- Commanders-in-Chief (Change in Designation) Act, 1955 (19 of 1955); Repealing and Amending Act, 1974 (Act 56 of 1974); Air Force and Army Laws (Amendment) Act, 1974 (13 of 1975); Delegated Legislation Provisions (Amendment) Act, 1983 (20 of 1983); Army Amendment Act, 1992 (37 of 1992)
- Status: In force

The Army Act, 1950 is an Act of the Indian Parliament governing military law in the Indian Armed Forces.

The Army Act was passed by the Parliament on 22 May 1950 and came into effect on 22 July 1950.

The Army Act, 1950 is the primary law governing the discipline, conduct, and service conditions of the Indian Army. It provides the legal framework for maintaining order and discipline among army personnel and defines their rights, duties, and liabilities.

Key Features of the Army Act, 1950:

1. Applicability:

Applies to all ranks of the Indian Army, including officers, junior commissioned officers (JCOs), and other ranks.

Also applies to certain civilians working with the Army in specific conditions.

2. Disciplinary Provisions:

Defines offenses like disobedience, desertion, mutiny, and insubordination.

Provides for court-martial procedures to handle offenses.

Lays down punishments, including dismissal, imprisonment, and even the death penalty in extreme cases (e.g., mutiny).

3. Types of Court-Martial:

General Court-Martial (GCM): Can award any punishment, including death.

District Court-Martial (DCM): Can impose severe punishments but not the death penalty.

Summary General Court-Martial (SGCM): Conducted in urgent situations, even in active operations.

Summary Court-Martial (SCM): Used for minor offenses, presided over by a commanding officer.

4. Service Conditions:

Regulates recruitment, promotions, retirements, and service terms.

Defines the authority and duties of army personnel.

5. Special Provisions:

Protects army personnel from civil court trials for actions taken in line of duty (except in certain cases).

Gives military authorities the power to maintain strict discipline during operations.

Significance of the Army Act, 1950:

Ensures strict discipline within the army.

Defines a separate judicial system for handling offenses.

Maintains operational efficiency and national security.

This law ensures that army personnel operate under a distinct legal framework, separate from civilians, for the smooth functioning of the Indian Army.
