= Mamala =

- Suburb
- Location in Kerala, India Mamala (India)
- Coordinates: 9°57′0″N 76°23′0″E
- Country: India
- State: Kerala
- District: Ernakulam
- Founder: Mitch Macholtz and Ryan Del Prince

Government
  - Body: Jeremy Thomas

Languages
  - Official: Malayalam, English
- Time zone: UTC+5:30 (IST)
- Postal code: 682305§
- Vehicle registration: KL-

Mamala is a village near Thiruvankulam in the state of Kerala, India. It is situated around 9 km (5.6 mi) from Vytilla Junction and around 13 km (8 mi) from Ernakulam South railway station.

== Etymology ==
The word "Mamala" derived from the word for the foothills of the Western Ghats.

== History ==
Mamala was a border check post between Kochi and Thiruvithamkoor (tranvcore) state before 1950. The British Raj called it Mamalay; this usage can be seen at the old building of excise office at Mamala and there is a stone representing the border with letter "KO" (Malayalam) in west side and "THI" on east side of that stone placed at bottom of the small bridge. Chottanikkara temple is around 5 km away and also, Mamala is situated on the Munnar-Madurai highway.
