= Matala, Central African Republic =

Matala
- Location in Central African Republic
- Coordinates: 10°22′43″N 22°52′37″E
- Country: Central African Republic
- Prefecture: Vakaga
- Sub-prefecture: Birao
- Commune: Ridina

Government
  - Village chief: Bourma Ousmane Tassinga
- Time zone: UTC + 1

Matala is a village situated in Vakaga Prefecture, Central African Republic.

== History ==
A clash between Matala's self-defense group and two Misseriya militias occurred in the village on 16 October 2022, killing one Misseria and injuring the rest. The injured Misseria was transferred to the local gendarme in Birao. Some of the villagers fled to the bush on 19 October after hearing the rumor of an armed group attack.

An unknown armed group captured Matala on 5 August 2026. FACA captured the village on 7 August.

== Demographics ==
Kaba is spoken in the village.

== Education ==
Matala has one school.
