= Ram Jethmalani =

Indian lawyer and politician (1923–2019)

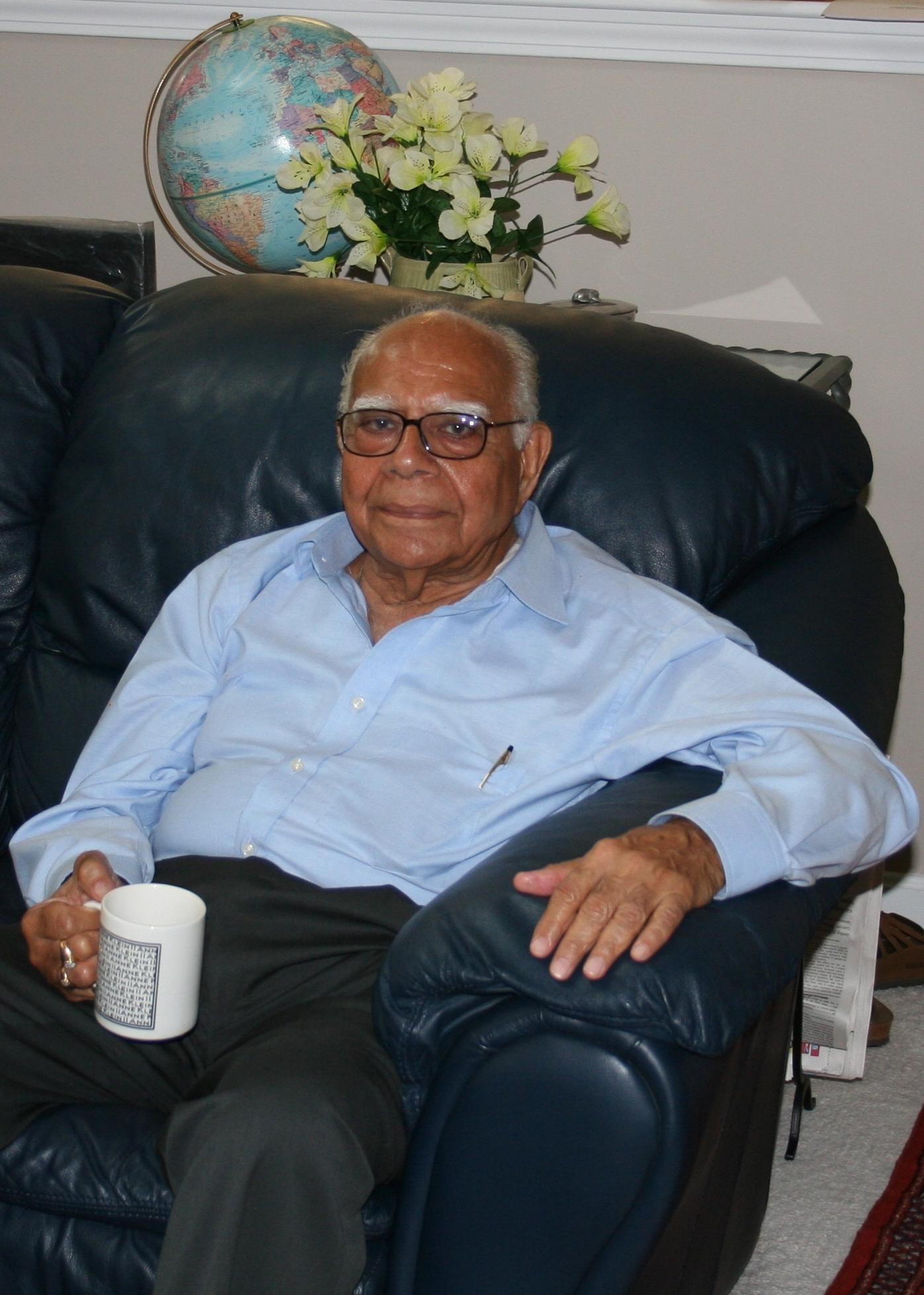
- Jethmalani in August 2006

Minister of Law and Justice
- In office 16 May 1996 – 1 June 1996
- Prime Minister: Atal Bihari Vajpayee
- Preceded by: Kotla Vijaya Bhaskara Reddy
- Succeeded by: Ramakant Khalap
- In office 8 June 1999 – 23 July 2000
- Prime Minister: Atal Bihari Vajpayee
- Preceded by: Rangarajan Kumaramangalam
- Succeeded by: Arun Jaitley

Minister of Urban Development
- In office 19 March 1998 – 14 June 1999
- Prime Minister: Atal Bihari Vajpayee
- Preceded by: Ummareddy Venkateswarlu
- Succeeded by: Jagmohan

Member of Parliament, Rajya Sabha
- In office 8 July 2016 – 8 September 2019
- Constituency: Bihar
- In office 5 July 2010 – 4 July 2016
- Constituency: Rajasthan
- In office 10 April 2006 – 26 August 2009
- Constituency: Nominated
- In office 3 April 1994 – 9 April 2006
- Constituency: Maharashtra
- In office 3 April 1988 – 2 April 1994
- Constituency: Karnataka

Member of Parliament, Lok Sabha
- In office 25 March 1977 – 31 December 1984
- Preceded by: Hari Ramchandra Gokhale
- Succeeded by: Sunil Dutt
- Constituency: Mumbai North-West

Personal details
- Born: 14 September 1923 Shikarpur, Bombay Presidency, British India (present-day Sindh, Pakistan)
- Died: 8 September 2019 (aged 95) New Delhi, India
- Party: Rashtriya Janata Dal (2016–2019)
- Other political affiliations: Bharatiya Janata Party (1980–1985, 2010–2013); Janata Dal (1989–1993); Pavitra Hindustan Kazhagam (1995)
- Spouses: Durga Jethmalani (m. 1941) Ratna Jethmalani (m. 1947)
- Children: Mahesh Jethmalani
- Education: S.C. Shahani Law College, Karachi- University of Bombay
- Profession: Lawyer, Jurist, Professor of Law, Politician, Entrepreneur, Philanthropist

Ram Boolchand Jethmalani (14 September 1923 – 8 September 2019) was an Indian lawyer and politician. He served as India's Minister of Law and Justice, as chairman of the Bar Council of India, and as the president of the Supreme Court Bar Association.

Jethmalani obtained his LL.B degree at the age of 17 and started practising law in his hometown, Shikarpur, until the Partition of India. The partition led him to move to Mumbai as a refugee where he began his life and career afresh. He announced his retirement from judicial profession in 2017.

Throughout his political career, Jethmalani worked for improving the relations between India and Pakistan, owing to his experiences as a refugee post-partition. He was elected as member of the Lok Sabha twice, contensting from Janata Party, from the Mumbai North West Lok Sabha constituency. He also served as the Minister of Housing and Urban Affairs in the first Atal Bihari Vajpayee ministry, against whom he later contested election in the 2004 Indian general elections from the Lucknow Lok Sabha constituency. He later returned to BJP in 2010, and was elected to the Rajya Sabha on its ticket.

Jethmalani was awarded the Human Rights Award by World Peace Through Law in 1977. He authored books such as Big Egos, Small Men; Conscience of a Maverick; and Maverick: Unchanged, Unrepentant; among others. He also co-authored legal scholarly books on different fields of law.

== Personal life ==
Jethmalani was born on 14 September 1923 in Shikarpur, Sindh in the Sindh division of the then Bombay Presidency (today a part of Pakistan) to Boolchand Gurmukhdas Jethmalani and Parbati Boolchand. He got a double promotion in school and completed matriculation at the age of 13. At the age of 17 he secured an LL.B. degree from the University of Bombay with a first class distinction. At that time, the minimum age for becoming a lawyer was 21, but a special exception (resulting from an application that he made to the court contesting the rule regarding minimum age) allowed him to become a lawyer at the age of 18. He received his LL.M. from Bombay University, since Sindh did not have a university of its own at that time.

Jethmalani married his first wife, Durga, in a traditional Indian arranged marriage, around the age of 18. In 1947, just before the Partition of India, he married his second wife, Ratna Shahani, a lawyer by profession. His family includes both of his wives and four children – three by Durga (Rani, Shobha, Mahesh) and one by Ratna (Janak). Among his two sons and two daughters, Mahesh and Rani have been supreme court lawyers while Mahesh is also a BJP leader, and Rani a social activist. Kamna Jethmalani, an actress in Telugu and Tamil films is related to him. She is the granddaughter of one of his brothers.

Jethmalani died on 8 September 2019 in New Delhi at his home at the age of 95. According to his son Mahesh Jethmalani, he had been unwell for the last few months of his life, and died at 7:45 am (IST), six days short of his 96th birthday.

== Career ==
=== Legal career ===
Ram Jethmalani started his career as a lawyer and Professor in Sindh before partition. He started his own law firm in Karachi with his friend A. K. Brohi who was senior to him by seven years. In February 1948, when riots broke out in Karachi, he fled to India on the advice of his friend Brohi and when he came to India in that day he had only INR 10 in his pocket and with that note he stayed in the refugee camp for few days.

Jethmalani fought his first case at the age of 17 in the Sindh High Court under Justice Godfrey Davis, contesting the rule regarding minimum age passed by the Bar Council of Sindh. In a talk at Algebra in June 2017, Jethmalani recounted his first case fought in India as a refugee. The newly introduced Bombay Refugees Act treated refugees in an inhumane manner, against which Jethmalani filed a case in the Bombay High Court, praying for the law to be declared unconstitutional, a case he won.

Jethmalani later came to be noted for his appearance in the Nanavati case in 1959 with Y. V. Chandrachud, who was later to become the Chief Justice of India. His defence of a string of smugglers in the late 1960s established his image as a "smuggler's lawyer", to which he mentioned that he was only doing his duty as a lawyer.

In 1954, he became a part-time Professor at the Government Law College, Mumbai for both graduate and post graduate studies. He also taught comparative law at the Wayne State University in Detroit, Michigan. He has been the Chairman of Bar Council of India for four tenures, before as well as after the emergency. In 1996, he also became a member of the International Bar Association. He has served as the Professor Emeritus for Symbiosis International University law schools. In 2010, he was also elected as the president of the Supreme Court Bar Association.

During his career he was involved in a number of high-profile defence cases as lawyer – people involved in market scams (Harshad Mehta and Ketan Parekh), and a host of gangsters and smugglers including the British citizen Daisy Angus who was acquitted of hashish smuggling after serving five years in jail. He also defended L. K. Advani in the Hawala scandal. He was in the news for taking up the defence of Manu Sharma, prime accused in the Murder of Jessica Lal; however, he failed to get Manu Sharma acquitted. He was to be defending Lalit Modi, former Indian Premier League chairman and commissioner. Some of the cases Jethmalani appeared in include — the defence of Indira Gandhi's alleged assassins, challenging the medical evidence deposed of Tirath Das Dogra, a forensic expert of AIIMS, on record; defending Harshad Mehta in a stock market scam and the Narasimha Rao bribery case; defending Ketan Parekh in a stock market scam; appearing in a case involving Mumbai mafia gang leader, Haji Mastan; speaking on record against the death sentence of Afzal Guru, though he had not taken up the case; defending L. K. Advani in the Hawala scandal; defending Manu Sharma in Jessica Lall's murder; defending Amit Shah in the Sohrabuddin encounter case; defending Amit Jogi in the Jaggi murder case; appearing for Sanjay Chandra's bail in the 2G spectrum case; appearing for Kulbhushan Parashar's bail in the navy war room leak case; defending Kanimozhi in the 2G spectrum case; appearing in Y. S. Jagan Mohan Reddy's special leave petition on stay for CBI probe into money laundering in his companies; appearing in B. S. Yediyurappa's case on an illegal mining scam; defending A. G. Perarivalan, T Suthendraraja alias Santhan, and Sriharan alias Murugan, all convicted in the Rajiv Gandhi assassination case; defending Ramdev in case of allaged use of force on his followers at Ramlila grounds on 4 June 2011; defending Shiv Sena in Krishna Desai's murder; defending Asaram in the Jodhpur sexual assault case; defending Lalu Prasad Yadav in the supreme court and appearing for his bail in the fodder scam case, on 13 December 2013; appearing for Subrata Roy in the Sahara-SEBI case; appearing for AIADMK leader J. Jayalalithaa, convicted in a disproportionate assets case by the Karnataka High Court; and, appearing for AAP president Arvind Kejriwal, in a defamation case filed by Arun Jaitley, among others.

On 9 September 2017, he announced his retirement from the legal profession.

=== Political career ===
Jethmalani's experience during the partition as a refugee led him to advocate for better relations between India and Pakistan, which he sought throughout his political career. He contested as an independent candidate from Ulhasnagar supported both by the Shiv Sena and Bharatiya Jana Sangh but he lost the elections. During the emergency period of 1975–1977, he was the chairman of the Bar Association of India. He heavily criticised then Prime Minister of India, Indira Gandhi. An arrest warrant was issued against him from Kerala which was stayed by the Bombay high court when over three hundred lawyers, led by Nani Palkhivala, appeared for him. However, the stay was nullified by the habeas corpus judgement in Additional District Magistrate of Jabalpur v. Shiv Kant Shukla. Jethmalani exiled himself in Canada carrying on his campaign against the emergency. He returned to India ten months later after the emergency was lifted. While in Canada, his candidature for the Parliament was filed from the Mumbai North West Lok Sabha constituency. He won the election and retained the seat in 1980 general elections, but lost to Sunil Dutt in 1985. In the 1977 general elections after the emergency, he won against then serving Union law minister H. R. Gokhale from Bombay in the Lok Sabha elections, and hence started his political career as a parliamentarian. However he was not made law minister himself as Morarji Desai disapproved of his lifestyle.

He became a member of the Rajya Sabha in 1988 and the Minister of Law and Justice and company affairs in 1996, in the cabinet of Atal Bihari Vajpayee. During the second tenure of Atal Bihari Vajpayee, in 1998, he was given the portfolio of Union minister of urban affairs and employment. But on 13 October 1999 he was again sworn in as the Union minister for law, justice and company affairs. He was asked to resign by the prime minister following differences with then chief justice of India Adarsh Sein Anand and Attorney General of India Soli Sorabjee. He was inducted into the cabinet on home Minister L. K. Advani's insistence.

He had also announced his candidature for President of India stating: "I owe it to the nation to offer my services". He launched his own political fronts, the Bharat Mukti Morcha, as a "mass movement" in 1987. In 1995, he launched his own political party called the Pavitra Hindustan Kazhagam, with the motto to achieve "transparency in functioning of Indian democracy".

In the 2004 Indian general election, he contested against Atal Bihari Vajpayee from the Lucknow Lok Sabha constituency as an independent candidate. The Indian National Congress did not field their candidates in this election; however, he lost. Later on, in 2010, he was given a Rajya Sabha ticket by Bharatiya Janata Party from Rajasthan and he was elected. He was also a member of the Committee on Personnel, Public Grievances, Law and Justice. Jethmalani has been criticised as being "opportunistic" as a result of this. Jethmalani was noted for speaking his mind; at a reception hosted by the Pakistan High Commission for the Pakistan Foreign Minister Hina Rabbani Khar who was on a visit to India on 28 July 2011, Jethmalani in the presence of the Chinese ambassador called China an enemy of both India and Pakistan and warned the Indians and Pakistanis to beware of the Chinese.

In December 2009, the Committee on Judicial Accountability and Judicial Reforms stated that it considered that recommendations for judicial appointments should only be made after a public debate, including review by members of the bar of the affected high courts. This statement was made in relation to controversy about the appointments of justices Chandramauli Kumar Prasad and P. D. Dinakaran. The statement was signed by Jethmalani, Shanti Bhushan, Fali Sam Nariman, Anil B. Divan, Kamini Jaiswal and Prashant Bhushan.

In 2012, Jethmalani wrote to then Bharatiya Janata Party President Nitin Gadkari, accusing opposition BJP leaders of being "silent against the huge corruption" within the ruling UPA-II government, and stated that BJP "is sick". Jethmalani's letter became public on the internet. The same year, in November, Jethmalani stated "When there are serious allegations against Gadkari, he should have stayed away, if only to raise his stature in the public eye". He also said "I am sure the RSS is trying to influence the functioning of the BJP. After all, BJP leaders have grown up with the RSS".

In May 2013, BJP expelled Jethmalani from the party for six years, for having made anti-party statements. In October 2013, defamation charges were framed against BJP seeking ₹50 lakh (US$53,000) as "null and void and damages" for making a statement that he was not a fit person to be member of the party.

=== Later life ===
Jethmalani stepped into the role of an elder statesman, but took action on occasion, as he was also India's oldest practising lawyer. In 2017, he wrote an open letter to Justice C. S. Karnan, of the Calcutta High Court, who was embroiled in controversy:

As a senior member of the Bar and living in the departure lounge of God’s airport I am advising you to withdraw every word that you have uttered and humbly pray for pardon for every stupid action you have so far indulged in, I am sorry to tell you that I am convinced you have lost your mind. Your behaviour is that of a lunatic and someday that may be the only defence available to you do with no bright chance of success.

Karnan retired shortly thereafter.

Jethmalani died in 2019. Many former colleagues wrote remembrances of him.

== Elections contested ==
=== Lok Sabha ===
Year	Constituency	Party	Votes	%	Opponent	Opponent Party	Opponent Votes	%	Result	Margin	%
1971	Bhiwandi	Ind	97,203	29.13	S. V. Dhamankar	INC	163,684	49.06	Lost	-66,481	-19.93
1977	Mumbai North West	JP	246,446	61.09	H. R. Gokhale	INC	152,947	37.91	Won	93,499	23.18
1980	Mumbai North West	JP	207,767	51.17	Ramrao Adik	INC(I)	180,712	44.51	Won	27,055	6.66
1984	Mumbai North West	BJP	154,349	30.31	Sunil Dutt	INC	308,989	60.67	Lost	-154,640	-30.36
2004	Lucknow	Ind	53,566	9.97	Atal Bihari Vajpayee	BJP	324,714	56.12	Lost	-271,148	-46.15

=== Rajya Sabha ===
Position	Party	Constituency	From	To	Tenure
Member of Parliament, Rajya Sabha (1st Term)	JD	Karnataka	3 April 1988	2 April 1994	5 years, 364 days
Member of Parliament, Rajya Sabha (2nd Term)	IND	Maharashtra	3 April 1994	2 April 2000	5 years, 365 days
Member of Parliament, Rajya Sabha (3rd Term)	IND	Maharashtra	3 April 2000	2 April 2006	5 years, 364 days
Member of Parliament, Rajya Sabha (4th Term)	NOM	Nominated	10 April 2006	26 August 2009	3 years, 138 days
Member of Parliament, Rajya Sabha (5th Term)	IND	Rajasthan	5 July 2010	8 June 2016	5 years, 339 days
Member of Parliament, Rajya Sabha (6th Term)	RJD	Bihar	8 July 2016	8 Sept 2019	3 years, 62 days

== Awards and achievements ==
- International Jurist Award
- 1977 – Human Rights Award by World Peace Through Law

== Books ==
=== Books by Jethmalani ===
- Big Egos, Small Men (ISBN 978-8-1241-2002-6)
- Conflict of Laws (1955)
- Conscience of a Maverick (ISBN 8174765719)
- Justice: Soviet Style
- Maverick: Unchanged, Unrepentant (ISBN 8129133504)

Jethmalani had also co-authored various legal scholarly books on fields of law such as criminal law, administrative law, and media law.

=== Books on Jethmalani ===
- Ram Jethmalani : The Authorized Biography by Nalini Gera (ISBN 0670049360)
- The Rebel: A Biography of Ram Jethmalani by Susan Adelman (ISBN 9386495074)

== In popular culture ==
- Actor Mithilesh Chaturvedi portrays Jethmalani in Scam 1992, a Sony LIV's original web series based on 1992 Indian stock market scam of Harshad Mehta.
- Actor Sumeet Vyas portrays Ram Jethmalani in Hindi webseries The Verdict based on real life incident that is Nanavati case available on OTT platform Zee5 and in association with Ekta Kapoor's Alt Balaji.
- Actor Ram Kapoor portrays Jethmalani in the Bollywood film The Big Bull, starring Abhishek Bachchan, loosely based on the life and crimes of Harshad Mehta.
- Actor Sachin Khedekar portrays Jethmalani in the 2016 Bollywood film Rustom.

== See also ==
- K. M. Nanavati vs. State of Maharashtra

Lok Sabha
Preceded by H. R. Gokhale	Member of Parliament for Mumbai North West; 1977–1984	Succeeded by Sunil Dutt
Political offices
Preceded by Kotla Vijaya Bhaskara Reddy	Minister of Law and Justice; 16 May 1996 – 1 June 1996	Succeeded by Ramakant Khalap
Preceded by U. Venkateswarlu; As; Minister of State (Independent Charge)	Ministry of Urban Affairs & Employment; 19 March 1998 – 14 June 1999	Succeeded by Jagmohan; Ministry renamed as Ministry of Urban Development
Preceded by M. Thambi Durai	Minister of Law and Justice; June 1999 – 23 July 2000	Succeeded by Arun Jaitley
