= Shanti Bhushan =

Indian politician and lawyer (1925–2023)

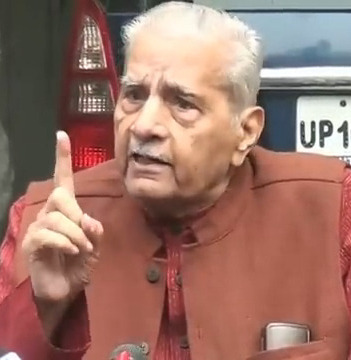
- Bhushan in 2015

Union Minister of Law and Justice
- In office 26 March 1977 – 28 July 1979
- Preceded by: H.R. Gokhale
- Succeeded by: Hans Raj Khanna

Member of Parliament, Rajya Sabha
- In office 14 July 1977 – 2 April 1980
- Constituency: Uttar Pradesh

Personal details
- Born: 11 November 1925 Bijnor, United Provinces, British India (present-day Uttar Pradesh, India)
- Died: 31 January 2023 (aged 97) Delhi, India
- Party: Swaraj Abhiyan
- Other political affiliations: Congress(O), Janata Party, Bharatiya Janata Party, Aam Aadmi Party
- Spouse: Kumud Bhushan
- Children: 4, including Shefali Bhushan, Shalini Gupta, Prashant Bhushan, and Jayant Bhushan
- Education: Ewing Christian College, Allahabad, Uttar Pradesh

Shanti Bhushan (11 November 1925 – 31 January 2023) was an Indian politician and lawyer. He served as the Law Minister of India holding office at the Ministry of Law and Justice from 1977 to 1979 in the Morarji Desai Ministry. He was a senior advocate of the Supreme Court of India. Bhushan was a member of many prominent political parties, such as the Aam Aadmi Party, Bharatiya Janata Party, Janata Party and Indian National Congress. He and his son Prashant Bhushan were jointly placed at the 74th position in a list of the most powerful Indians published by The Indian Express in 2009.

== Political career ==
Bhushan was an active member of the Congress (O) party and later the Janata Party. He was a member of the Rajya Sabha from 14 July 1977 to 2 April 1980 and held office of Union Law Minister in the Morarji Desai ministry from 1977 to 1979. As the Law minister, he introduced Forty-fourth Amendment of the Constitution of India, which repealed many provisions of Forty-second Amendment of the Constitution of India passed by the Indira Gandhi ministry.

He joined the Bhartiya Janata Party in 1980. In 1986, he resigned from BJP after the party acted against his advice over an election petition. He became a founding member of the Aam Aadmi Party after its formal launch in 2012, but resigned in 2015 after a disagreement with Arvind Kejriwal. He later joined the organisation Swaraj Abhiyan and in 2016 became a founding member of its related political party Swaraj India.

== Prominent cases and clients ==
- Bhushan represented Raj Narain in a case against Indira Gandhi, the then Prime Minister of India. Justice Jagmohan Lal Sinha judged Indira Gandhi guilty and declared her election to the Lok Sabha void. The decision resulted in widespread political protests and ultimately resulted in the declaration of a state of emergency in India.
- In 1994, he appeared for two of the defendants accused of participating in the 1993 Mumbai bomb blasts case.
- In 2002, he appeared as a counsel for Arundhati Roy in a contempt case against her in the Supreme Court of India.
- Bhushan represented Shaukat Hussain in 2008 for an appeal against his 10-year conviction for his role in the 2001 Indian Parliament attack.
- Bhushan appeared as senior counsel for Transparency International in the Provident Fund scandal case of Ghaziabad, which allegedly involved several judges of the Indian judiciary. The bench abandoned the hearing after deeming his remarks as contemptuous and termed his behavior as that of a street urchin.
- Shanti Bhushan was the counsel for the former Prime Minister of India H. D. Deve Gowda in a petition related to allocation of land for Bangalore - Mysore Infrastructure Corridor.
- He has represented Rajendra Singh Lodha regarding the assets of Birla Corporation.
- He represented V.S. Achuthanandan in the Supreme Court in the Idamalayar Dam corruption case against UDF leader R.Balakrishna Pillai and others. The bench awarded rigorous imprisonment for one year with fine of Rs. 10,000/- each to the accused persons.

== Activism ==
In the late 1980s Shanti Bhushan was one of the founders of the Centre for Public Interest Litigation, a Non-governmental organization that conducts litigation on matters of public interest. The first president was Justice V. M. Tarkunde, who was also the founder of the People's Union for Civil Liberties. Other founder members were senior advocates including Fali Sam Nariman, Anil Divan, Rajinder Sachar and Colin Gonsalves.

Shanti Bhushan, along with his son Prashant Bhushan has been involved in pressing for accountability in the Indian Judiciary by setting up Campaign for Judicial Accountability and Judicial Reform (CJAR). The campaign has been responsible for action against the judicial misconduct of Yogesh Kumar Sabharwal and for the declaration of assets by the judges. The campaign had also protested against the actions and appointments of Justice S. Ashok Kumar, Madan Mohan Punchhi, Soumitra Sen and Ashwini Kumar Mata. In December 2009 the Committee on Judicial Accountability stated that it considered that recommendations for judicial appointments should only be made after a public debate, including review by members of the bar of the affected high courts. This statement was made in relation to controversy about the appointments of justices C. K. Prasad and P. D. Dinakaran. The statement was signed by Ram Jethmalani, Shanti Bhushan, Fali Sam Nariman, Anil B. Divan, Kamini Jaiswal and Prashant Bhushan.

The father-son duo are currently facing charges for contempt of court in Supreme Court of India for their statement about corruption in higher judiciary - specifically, about the corruption of former Chief Justices of the Supreme Court. During a hearing on the running case for contempt of court in November 2010, Shanti Bhushan went on to say, "The question of apology does not arise. I am prepared to go to jail."

Shanti Bhushan was a prominent member of the core committee of India Against Corruption. The first Lokpal Bill was passed in the 4th Lok Sabha in 1969, but did not pass through the Rajya Sabha. Shanti Bhushan was a member of the Joint Drafting Committee for the Jan Lokpal Bill, constituted by the Government of India, representing the Civil Society.

== Works ==
- Courting Destiny: A Memoir (2008)

== See also ==
- Jan Lokpal Bill

Political offices
Preceded by H. R. Gokhale	Minister of Law and Justice; 26 March 1977 - 28 July 1979	Succeeded by Hans Raj Khanna
