= Judicial corruption in India =

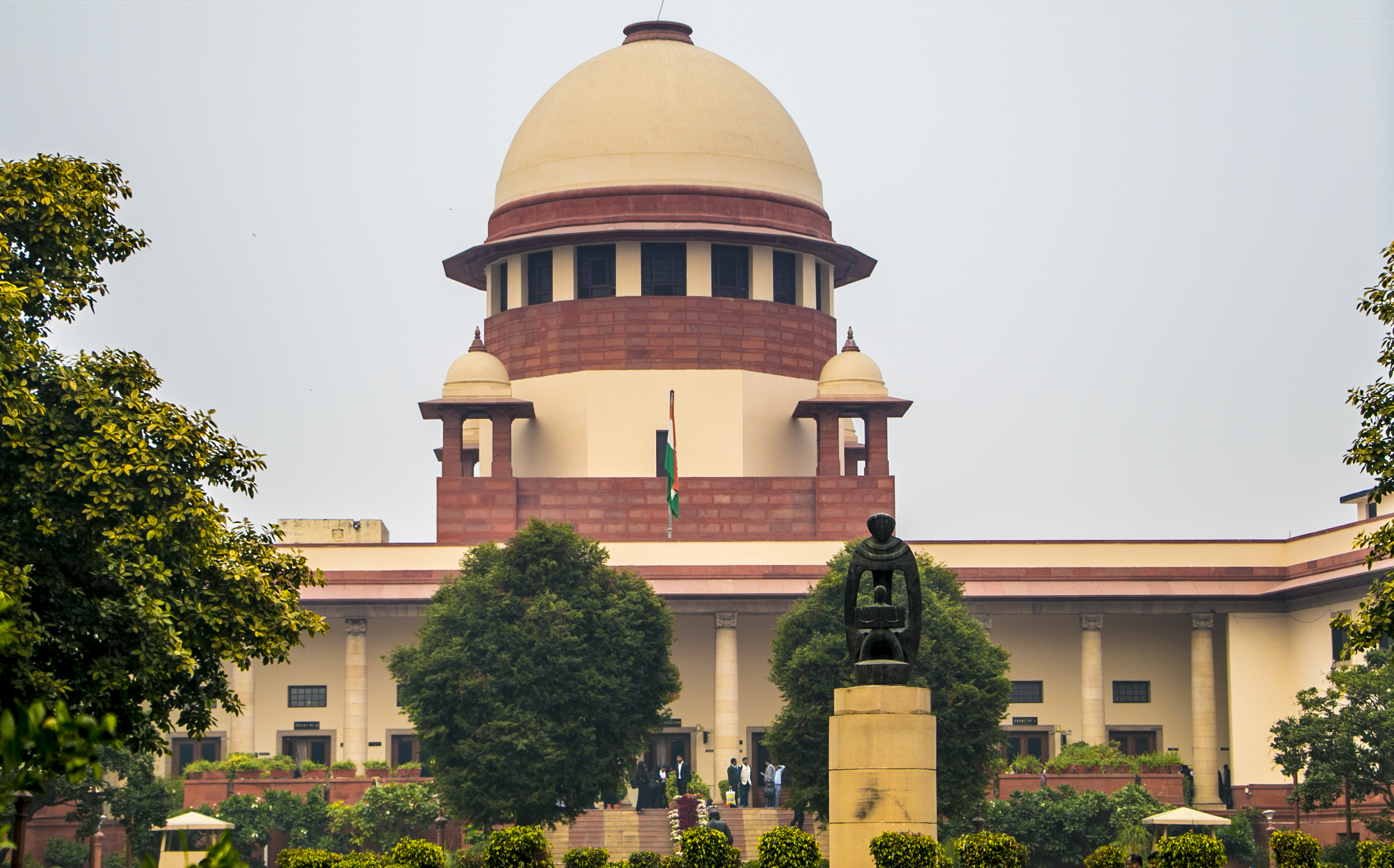
- The Supreme Court of India, New Delhi

Judicial corruption in India refers to unethical, illegal, or biased practices within the Indian judiciary that undermine its independence, integrity, and credibility. Corruption allegations have been reported at various levels of the system—from the lower judiciary to the higher courts, including the Supreme Court of India. Observers argue that a lack of transparency in appointments, inefficient administrative practices, and weak accountability mechanisms have allowed corruption to persist within the judicial framework.

According to Transparency International, judicial corruption in India is attributable to factors such as "delays in the disposal of cases, shortage of judges, and complex procedures, all of which are exacerbated by a preponderance of new laws".

== Background ==
The Indian judiciary is one of the three constitutional pillars of governance, alongside the legislature and the executive. It serves as the guardian of the Constitution and protector of citizens’ fundamental rights. Despite its formal independence, the system has frequently faced criticism for delays, inefficiency, and allegations of corruption. Reports from the Press Information Bureau and Transparency International have indicated recurring complaints about judicial functioning and integrity. Between 2017 and 2021, over 1,600 complaints related to judicial misconduct were forwarded to the Chief Justice of India or respective high courts for review.

== Nature and causes ==
Judicial corruption in India takes several forms. It can involve bribery or influence-peddling to obtain favourable judgments, interference by political or business interests, or the manipulation of administrative processes such as case allocation or transfers. The opacity of the collegium system—responsible for appointing and transferring judges—has been repeatedly criticised for nepotism and a lack of meritocracy.

Long-standing case backlogs exacerbate these vulnerabilities. With more than 50 million cases pending in courts as of 2024, the system’s inefficiency has made litigants susceptible to seeking shortcuts or paying bribes to expedite proceedings. Scholars have also pointed to the promise of post-retirement appointments as a potential influence on judicial conduct, suggesting that judges may be swayed by political expectations.

== Major cases and controversies ==
In November 2011, a former Supreme Court Justice Ruma Pal slammed the higher judiciary for what she called the seven sins. She listed the sins as:

  - Turning a blind eye to the injudicious conduct of a colleague.
  - Hypocrisy – the distortion of the norm of judicial independence.
  - Secrecy – lack of transparency in the appointment of judges to the High and Supreme Court.
  - Plagiarism and prolixity – SC judges often lift whole passages from earlier decisions without acknowledgement – and use long-winded, verbose language.
  - Arrogance – the higher judiciary has claimed superiority and independence to mask their own indiscipline and transgression of norms and procedures.
  - Professional incompetence – judges arrive at decisions of grave importance, ignoring precedent or judicial principle.
  - Nepotism – wherein favours are sought and dispensed by some judges.

=== Important cases ===
Several high-profile cases have exposed the problem of judicial corruption in India.

- In 1993, Justice V. Ramaswami became the first Supreme Court judge to face impeachment proceedings after being found guilty by a parliamentary committee of financial irregularities. The motion ultimately failed in Parliament due to political divisions, but it set a precedent for judicial accountability.
- There have been allegations that judges with doubtful integrity were elevated within the higher judiciary and campaigns held for their impeachment.
- In 2011, Justice Soumitra Sen of the Calcutta High Court resigned shortly before his impeachment after being found guilty of misappropriating funds.
- Another controversy arose in 2008 Ghaziabad Provident Fund scam, where court employees’ provident funds were embezzled, allegedly involving several district and high court judges, including Tarun Chatterjee.
- In 2017, the medical college bribery case led to a Central Bureau of Investigation (CBI) probe into alleged attempts to influence judicial orders related to private medical colleges.
- In 2017, Justice C S Karnan, a sitting judge of the Calcutta High Court, wrote to the Prime Minister and several judicial authorities, flagging the names of 20 judges of various High Courts and Supreme Court, as well as three officials, alleging that they were corrupt. As he did not provide any evidence regarding his claims. He also sentenced Justice Karnan sentenced Chief Justice of India Jagdish Singh Khehar and seven other Supreme Court judges to five-year rigorous imprisonment after holding them guilty under the Scheduled Caste and Scheduled Tribe (Prevention of Atrocities) Act, 1989 and the amended Act of 2015 for transferring him from Madras High Court to Calcutta High Court. For this he was found guilty of contempt of court and sentences to six months' imprisonment by the Supreme Court in a suo motu ruling. The Supreme Court also barred the media from publishing and broadcasting Justice Karnan's statements. He was the first sitting High Court Judge in India to be sentenced for contempt of court.
- In 2024, Bangalore Techie Atul Subhash accused Kanpur Sessions Court judge Reeta Kaushik of asking for a 5 lakh bribe to settle his divorce case with his wife, and taunting him into committing suicide when he refused.
- In March 2025, a fresh controversy erupted when a fire in the house of Delhi High Court Judge Justice Yashwant Varma’s residence revealed large quantities of unaccounted cash, prompting calls for his impeachment and renewed debate on judicial accountability. The scene of large sums of Indian money being burnt was described as "shocking". The Supreme Court declined to hear a plea seeking an FIR against Varma following the expose. Despite the demands to have him removed and suspended, Varma was transferred to the Allahabad High Court, sparking a backlash from lawyers and other judges. An impeachment process against Verma was due to be initiated in the Parliament monsoon season in July 2025, but were delayed. On 10 April 2026, before the impeachment proceedings, Varma resigned. The report of the inquiry committee that was investigating the matter, tabled its report in the Lok Sabha on 12 August 2026 and found him guilty of misconduct. The report stated that justice Varma could not provide a "satisfactory explanation" for the cash, and also refused to participate in judicial proceedings and state his case on oath and "did not face cross-examination."

Supreme Court ban on NCERT textbook chapter on judicial corruption

In February 2026, the Supreme Court of India took suo motu cognisance of a Class 8 social science textbook published by the National Council of Educational Research and Training (NCERT), which contained a section discussing corruption and other structural challenges in the judiciary. A bench comprising Chief Justice Surya Kant and Justices Joymalya Bagchi and Vipul M. Pancholi ordered a complete ban on the publication, circulation, and digital dissemination of the textbook and directed authorities to seize copies already distributed.

== Impact ==
Judicial corruption undermines the credibility of the legal system and erodes public faith in the rule of law. It creates unequal access to justice, where financially or politically powerful individuals can secure favourable outcomes, while ordinary citizens face protracted litigation and bias. It also deters investment, as foreign and domestic businesses lose confidence in contract enforcement and legal predictability. Moreover, when judges accused of misconduct remain unpunished, it fosters institutional cynicism and a sense of impunity.

== Mechanisms of accountability ==
Under Articles 124(4) and 217 of the Constitution of India, judges of the Supreme Court and High Courts can be removed by the President after a parliamentary process for proven misbehaviour or incapacity. However, impeachment is rare and politically sensitive, with only a handful of attempts since independence.

To address complaints internally, the judiciary adopted the “Restatement of Values of Judicial Life” in 1997 and established an “in-house procedure” allowing the Chief Justice of India or respective High Court Chief Justices to handle allegations of misconduct. While these mechanisms promote internal discipline, critics argue they lack transparency and independence, as proceedings are confidential and often inconclusive.

== Reform efforts ==
Legal experts and commissions have proposed numerous reforms to enhance judicial integrity. These include making the collegium process more transparent, establishing an independent judicial accountability commission, mandating annual asset disclosures by judges, and digitizing court processes to minimize human discretion. The Digital India courts initiative, aimed at e-filing and video hearings, is also considered a step toward reducing corruption opportunities.

Public figures such as Fali S. Nariman, Prashant Bhushan, and Arundhati Roy have repeatedly called for external oversight and transparency to preserve the judiciary’s moral authority.

== See also ==
- Judiciary of India
- Issues in the judiciary of India
- Corruption in India

== Bibliography ==
- Justice Markandey Katju. Whither Indian Judiciary. 2018, Bloomsbury Publishing.ISBN 9789386141255
- Dr. K.V. Sreenivasan ·The Canon Of Judicial Ethics Vs corruption. 2022. Clever Fox Publishing.
