= Lily Thomas =

Indian lawyer (1927–2019)

- Born: Lily Isabel Thomas; 5 March 1928; Kottayam, Kingdom of Travancore, British India (present day Kerala, India)
- Died: 10 December 2019 (aged 91); Delhi, India
- Education: Master of Laws; Bachelor of Laws; Bachelor of Science
- Alma mater: University of Madras
- Occupation: Lawyer
- Known for: Co-petitioner in Representation of the People Act, 1951 case
- Parents: Adv. K. T. Thomas; Annamma

Lily Isabel Thomas (5 March 1928 – 10 December 2019) was an Indian lawyer who initiated improvement and change to existing laws by filing petitions in the Supreme Court of India and regional courts. Her petitions resulted in changes to laws to prevent convicted politicians getting elected, the addition of a new marriage law and protections for parliamentarians. She was hailed most notably for petitioning to amend the Representation of the People Act, 1951.

== Early life ==
Lily hailed from Kottayam and grew up in Thiruvananthapuram. She had joined Madras High Court in 1955, under which she studied the LL.M. course which was completed in 1959. Lily belongs to the first generation of women lawyers in India and she was the first woman to complete the LL.M. course from the University of Madras.

After obtaining a law degree from Madras University, she started her practice in the Madras High Court. She was the first lady in India to qualify for an LL.M. degree. In 1960, she moved to Delhi to do a Ph.D. but discovered that she was not really cut out for academia. "I realised that I was not competent to do research," she admitted, "so I started practising in the Supreme Court".

Lily was once senior most woman lawyer in the Supreme Court of India, when she had joined it in 1960.

== Career ==
Lily Thomas had joined the Supreme Court of India in 1960. She dropped out of doctorate in law after coming to Delhi and started working where her brother John Thomas was already practising. Lily filed petitions since 1964 on different issues such as the validity of 'Advocate-on-Record Examination', sorting out issues of railway employees and case on conversion to Islam for the express purpose of entering into a second marriage in 2000. Thomas worked on constitutional law, women's rights and issues of personal liberty. Lily was an advocate in OLD LAWYERS CHAMBERS BLOCKS.

Lily was first known for petitioning in 1952 in the Supreme Court to amend the Representation of the People Act, 1951 in order to get declared Section 8(4) of the act as unconstitutional, eventually which was rejected by the Court then.

In 2013, at the age of 85, she won a landmark judgement under which members of India's Parliament and members of state legislative bodies, convicted of a crime or in jail, became ineligible to run for elections or hold an elected seat. Prior to this judgment, members of Parliament who were convicted but had filed an appeal could go about their regular business, including being elected and holding seats.

Lily Thomas, along with Adv. Satya Narain Shukla had filed a Writ petition in the apex court in 2005, challenging a provision of the Representation of the People Act which protects convicted lawmakers against disqualification on the grounds of pendency of appeal against their conviction in the higher courts. On 10 July 2013, a bench of justices A. K. Patnaik and S. J. Mukhopadhaya held that, "The only question is about the vires of section 8(4) of the Representation of the People Act (RPA), 1951 and we hold that it is ultra vires and that the disqualification takes place from the date of conviction."

=== Validity of "Advocate on Record" system ===
Lily was one of the first lawyers to file a petition in the Supreme Court challenging the validity of the 'Advocate on Record' system on 14 January 1964. Under this system, only those advocates who have passed the AOR exam are eligible to file petitions. Lily believed that 'Section 30' under Part IV of the Advocates Act, 1961 mentions that all advocates have the right to practise in all courts including the Supreme Court in India and no restriction should be imposed for passing an exam and 'Section 16' differentiates lawyers into Advocates and Senior Advocates. The issue of AOR was challenged and debated multiple times, on 16 October 2015 the Supreme Court struck down NJAC meant to replace the AOR, as unconstitutional and upheld the collegium system.

=== Petition on Stopping Conversion for Bigamy ===
Lily had filed the petition in the Supreme Court on status of the earlier marriage regarding a case when a non-Muslim gets converted to the 'Muslim' faith without any real change or belief without divorcing first wife. The Court after hearing similar petitions declared the practice of remarrying as null and void unless the first marriage is dissolved. The Law Commission sent the recommendation to the Law Ministry amending Hindu Marriage Act, 1955 to stop the illegal practice.

=== Striking down a provision of the Representation of the People Act ===
Lily along with Lucknow-based NGO Lok Prahari were the petitioners in the case when the Supreme Court had struck down Section 8(4) of the Representation of the People Act, 1951 to disqualify a legislator immediately when convicted for two or more years' prison. When the UPA government had prepared an ordinance to nullify the judgment, Lily made a review petition against the ordinance, the government had later withdrawn the ordinance route after severe criticism. She had got help from other experts, including Fali Sam Nariman in the case. Lily's petition was accepted the third time after successive rejections. The law had far reaching effect when influential politicians such as then Tamil Nadu Chief Minister Jayalalithaa, Rasheed Masood and Lalu Prasad were disqualified. Another disqualification case of sitting M.P. Rahul Gandhi in Mar 2023 was seen due to the same act applied.

The judgements were largely seen to cleanse politics from criminalization.

=== Other notable cases ===
- Lily Thomas vs State Of Tamil Nadu.
- Lily Thomas (Ms), Advocate vs Speaker, Lok Sabha And Ors.
- Ms. Lily Thomas vs State Of Maharashtra And Ors.
- Lily Thomas vs Union Of India (Uoi).

== Personal life ==
Lily believed it is the responsibility of the lawyers to fight through petitions to improve the existing laws and having criminals as politicians is an insult to the parliamentary system. Lily had considered her father who was also an advocate, her hero. At an old age, she went to the court every day and worked for 8–10 hours. Lily preferred reading Mills & Boon and having knowledge of Bible and Vishnu Sahasranama. She was a practising Syrian Christian.

Lily remained unmarried.

On 10 December 2019, Lily Thomas had died at the age of 91 in Delhi at a private hospital.

Adv. Saju Jakob is carrying forward the legacy of Adv. Lily Thomas through his law office namely Office of Lily Thomas and Saju Jakob, which has already conducted various Lily Thomas Memorial Lectures and Essay Writing Competitions.

On 12 December 2022, the Supreme Court Women Lawyers Association including the office of Lily Thomas & Saju Jakob had organised a memorial in memory of Lily.

The event was being attended by judges M. R. Shah and C. T. Ravikumar. The then Attorney General for India R. Venkataramani was the notable speaker for the memorial meeting. Other important attendees were advocate Pravin H. Parekh who is the president of ISIL & Confederation of Indian Bar, and advocate Pradeep Rai, vice-president of SCBA.
