= Committee on Judicial Accountability and Judicial Reforms =

Committee on Judicial Accountability
- Type: NGO
- Purpose: Legal transparency

The Committee on Judicial Accountability and Judicial Reforms (CJAR) is a group of lawyers in India who work to improve the accountability of judges.

In 1998 the committee prepared a charge sheet to impeach Justice Madan Mohan Punchhi, and obtained the signatures of 25 Rajya Sabha MPs. However, Punchhi was appointed Chief Justice of India before the required 50 signatures had been obtained, at which point it became impossible to gain further support for the motion.

The Committee on Judicial Accountability issued a highly critical report on the Judges Enquiry Bill, 2006, saying of that bill that it "is going to reduce whatever little accountability of Judges remained under the present Judges Enquiry Act". Anil B. Divan said "The aforementioned new bill is worse than the old Judges Inquiry Act and it needs to be scrapped in toto. This new bill is nothing but a sham".

In December 2009 the CJA stated that it considered that recommendations for judicial appointments should only be made after a public debate, including review by members of the bar of the affected high courts. This statement was made in relation to controversy about the appointments of justices C. K. Prasad and P. D. Dinakaran. The statement was signed by Ram Jethmalani, Shanti Bhushan, Fali Sam Nariman, Anil B. Divan, Kamini Jaiswal and Prashant Bhushan. Prashant Bhushan is also the convenor of the Working Committee of the Campaign for Judicial Accountability and Judicial Reforms.
