= Yashwant Varma cash row =

2025 Indian political scandal

The Cash row refers to the controversial 2025 case of Yashwant Varma, a judge of the Allahabad High Court (previously of the Delhi High Court), in which large amounts of burnt and partially burnt cash were found at his home after a fire on March 14–15, 2025.

== Background and discovery ==
A fire started on 14 March 2025 at around 11:35 at Judge Yashwants Varma's house on 30 Tughlak Crescent, New Delhi. Firefighters and police officials who arrived on site witnessed stacks of burnt and half-burnt ₹500 notes on the floor of a store room. The scene of large sums of Indian money being burnt was described as "shocking".

== Investigation ==
Following the events of the fire, on March 22, 2025, the Chief Justice of India, Sanjiv Khanna, set up a team of three judges to look into this serious matter. They spoke with 55 witnesses over ten days, looked at electronic proof like CCTV footage, photos, and videos, and visited the location. They concluded that a large amount of cash had been kept in a storeroom secretly controlled by Varma. The report also said the money was quietly taken out early on March 15, even though some of it had been burned and was seen by the first responders. On August 12, 2025, Lok Sabha Speaker Om Birla announced a three-member inquiry committee to investigate the charges against him.

Justice Varma has denied claims that cash was found at his official residence in Delhi after an accidental fire in March last year. In his statement to a parliamentary committee reviewing the impeachment motion against him, he said that he was not in Delhi on the day of the incident and therefore cannot be held responsible if officials failed to properly secure the premises.

Justice Varma said he didn't know anything about the money that was allegedly kept in an outhouse/storehouse of his government accommodation. He said that this outhouse was not a part of the residential premises frequented by him or his family members. He also said that the outhouse was accessible by the domestic help of his government-allocated bungalow and the very allegation that someone would keep such a large amount of cash in such a place was itself incredible and incredulous. He said that neither he nor his family had put the cash in the storeroom and called the whole situation a “conspiracy.” In April 2025, he was moved from the Delhi High Court to the Allahabad High Court, and while the investigation continues, he has not been given any judicial duties.

== Findings and recommendations ==
The panel found that the accusations against Justice Varma were true and serious enough to possibly start impeachment proceedings. Former Chief Justice Sanjiv Khanna sent the report to the Indian President and Prime Minister, asking them to take action to remove Varma. The Report of the said panel was made public in Indian news outlets. Notable jurists such as Kapil Sibal and Mukul Rohatgi, former Attorney General for India, criticized the findings of the report, stating that it ignored settled evidentiary standards to prove culpability under Indian law.

The central government was said to be thinking about starting the impeachment process in Parliament during the Monsoon Session, which would need the support of at least 50 members of the Rajya Sabha and 100 members of the Lok Sabha.

== Significance and impact ==
The case has led to a nationwide discussion about honesty, openness, and responsibility in the judicial system, especially for top judges. People are now closely examining how the Supreme Court handles internal investigations and impeachment, and whether these processes are good enough to maintain public trust in the courts.

== See also ==
- Yashwant Varma
- Judicial corruption in India
