= V. Ramaswami =

Indian judge (1929–2025)

Veerasamy Ramaswami

Judge of Supreme Court of India
- In office 6 October 1989 – 14 February 1994

Chief Justice, Punjab and Haryana High Court
- In office 12 November 1987 – 6 October 1989
- Nominated by: Debi Singh Tewatia
- Appointed by: Shanti Sarup Dewan

Personal details
- Born: 15 February 1929
- Died: 8 March 2025 (aged 96) Chennai, Tamil Nadu, India
- Spouse: Sarojini Ramaswami

Veeraswami Ramaswami (15 February 1929 – 8 March 2025) was a judge of the Supreme Court of India and the first judge against whom removal proceedings were initiated in independent India.

== Early life and education ==
Veeraswami Ramaswami was born on 15 February 1929. His age was moved back by 2 years according to accounts from his late father-in-law Justice K Veeraswami, who was the former Chief Justice of the Madras High Court, and forged documents indicating 15 February 1929, as his birth date. In reality Ramaswami was born in 1927. He spent his school years at Hindu High School in Srivilliputhur. He was educated at The American College in Madurai and received a degree in Law from Madras Law College.

== Professional career ==
Ramaswami began his career by practising both civil and criminal law at the Madras High Court. He was appointed permanent Judge of the Madras High Court from 31 January 1971. He was later transferred and appointed Chief Justice of Punjab and Haryana High Court on 12 November 1987. At the height of his career, he was appointed Judge of the Supreme Court on 6 October 1989 from which he retired on 14 February 1994.

== Removal proceedings ==
=== Investigation ===
A scandal surfaced in the middle of the year 1990 when several media outlets reported about his ostentatious expenditure on his official residence during his tenure as a Chief Justice of Punjab and Haryana. On 1 February 1991, the Supreme Court Bar Association passed a resolution calling for his removal and requesting that the Chief justice not assign him any further legal work. The Bharatiya Janata Party and Left parties submitted a notice of motion to the Indian Parliament seeking his removal from office.

Accepting the motion on 12 March 1991, Speaker Rabi Ray constituted a committee composed of Justice P B Sawant of the Supreme Court, Chief Justice Prabodh Dinkarrao Desai of the Bombay High Court, and Justice O Chinnappa Reddy, retired judge of the Supreme Court to investigate the affair. The committee found Ramaswami guilty of 11 out of 14 charges.

=== Removal motion in the Lok Sabha (failed) ===
The removal motion was placed in the Lok Sabha for debate and voting on 10 May 1993. Well-known lawyer and Congress politician Kapil Sibal was Ramaswami's defence lawyer. The Committee constituted by the Speaker headed by Justice P.B Sawant found him guilty of misbehaviour. Justice Ramaswami's supporters tried to use all possible weapons to thwart the resolution. As the Dravidar Kazhagam's earlier ploy of calling it a plot by brahmins had failed, they now used a new strategy of calling it a conspiracy by North Indians to remove a South Indian judge from his post. Despite a three-member committee of judges finding that there was basis for nine of the 19 charges, of the 401 members present in the Lok Sabha that day, there were 196 votes for removal, no votes against, and 205 abstentions by the ruling Congress and its allies. The motion which requires a two-thirds majority of members present during voting and an absolute majority of the total membership of the house, thus failed to pass.

The said decision has been politically viewed as a means of defending corruption by the Congress and Anna Dravida Munnetra Kazhagam given the post-retirement offices he held.

== 1999 Lok Sabha election ==
Ramaswami contested from Sivakasi constituency as an Anna Dravida Munnetra Kazhagam (ADMK) candidate in the 1999 election against Vaiko from Marumalarchi Dravida Munnetra Kazhagam. Thamaraikani who had been expelled from ADMK contested as an independent. He lost the election to Vaiko though he secured 32.21% of the votes. Vaiko received 41.8% and Thamaraikani 4.74% of the votes.

== Personal life and death ==
Ramaswami had five children. His youngest son Sanjay Ramaswami is a lawyer and former member of the legislative assembly in Tamil Nadu, representing the Congress party. Public and private accounts from Justice Fathima Beevi, former Judge of the Supreme Court and former Governor of Tamil Nadu have indicated Ramaswami's interest in elevating Sanjay Ramaswami to a Judge of the Madras High Court, for which she recounts refusing on multiple occasions citing incompetence of Sanjay Ramaswami. On 8 March 2025, Ramaswami died at the age of 96.

== See also ==
- Soumitra Sen, former judge of the Calcutta High Court, who became the first judge to be impeached by the Rajya Sabha.
- P. D. Dinakaran, former Chief Justice of the Sikkim High Court, against whom Parliament initiated removal proceedings.
- C. S. Karnan – former judge of the Calcutta High Court, who became the first judge of a high court to be punished for contempt of court while in office.
- Judicial corruption in India
