= S. N. Srivastava =

S. N. Srivastava is an Indian jurist. He retired as a judge of the Allahabad High Court.

He is particularly notable for two remarkable, though non-binding, pronouncements from the bench. The first, on 5 April 2007, was a ruling that Muslims need not be granted minority status in Uttar Pradesh; although it was stayed the very next day by a division bench of the court, it created considerable uproar.

The second was an observation on 30 August 2007, during the hearing of a property-related petition filed by a Varanasi priest. "As India has recognised its national flag, national anthem, national bird, national animal and national flower, the Bhagavad Gita may be considered the rashtriya dharma shastra."

In his statement, he went on to claim that the Gita had "inspired those involved in the freedom struggle", and thus it was "the duty of every citizen of India under Article 51-A of the Constitution of India, irrespective of caste, creed or religion, to follow dharma as propounded by the Gita."

The statement caused considerable furore; a former Chief Justice of India, V. N. Khare was quoted as saying: "What he says is not constitutional... the state has no religion in this secular country." A former law minister Shanti Bhushan, demanded "a scheme" that would ensure that only "competent" people were appointed high court judges, referring to Srivastava's statement to say that "this just shows how people who don't know anything about the Constitution have become judges." The then Law Minister, H. R. Bhardwaj, said in a statement: "No judge should think like this, that there should be no freedom of religion or conscience."

However, V.P. Singhal of the right-wing Hindutva organisation Vishwa Hindu Parishad was reported as saying that the statement was clearly "not made as a Hindu but as a judge; he has justice in [sic] his mind."

Srivastava retired on 4 September 2007.
