= Manush Patrika =

Indian daily newspaper

Manush Patrika মানুষ পত্রিকা
- Type: Daily Newspaper
- Format: Broadsheet
- Founder: Kamala Ranjan Talapatra
- Editor-in-chief: Priyabrata Talapatra
- Founded: August 15, 1952
- Language: Bengali (বাংলা)
- Headquarters: Agartala, Tripura
- Circulation: 26000 (2009)
- Website: manushpatrika.com

Manush Patrika (Bengali: মানুষ পত্রিকা) is a Bengali daily newspaper published from Agartala, the capital of the Indian state Tripura. It is one of the oldest newspapers in India and the oldest in Tripura. The newspaper is also one of the most widely circulated Bengali-language daily newspapers in India. It is considered the most influential newspaper in Northeast India. The newspaper was started in 1952 by late freedom fighter and renowned journalist Kamala Ranjan Talapatra who served as the editor for over 50 years. As of 2024, his son, Priyabrata Talapatra is the editor. Manush Patrika is one of the oldest and widely circulated Bengali daily newspapers in India. It covers myriad topics (broadly politics, business, entertainment, sports etc.) from Tripura and the world, and has developed a reputation for political neutrality and 'strong principles and authentic reporting'.

== History ==
Manush Patrika began as a weekly and in 1974 it was transformed into a daily. It is one of the oldest dailies of Tripura. Manush Patrika is the fourth largest circulated daily in Tripura with a circulation of about 14154 copies according to a survey conducted by NEDFI.

== Content ==
Manush Patrika has previously criticized government policies that it states are not beneficial to the general population, and later received government sanctions. On 5 January 1982, The Press Council of India upheld a complaint by Manush Patrika, citing that the state government had unlawfully blocked the paper's advertisements. The council decided there was a direct link between articles written by the daily and the censorship of their advertisements.
