= Chandra Dhari Singh =

Indian judge

The Honourable Justice Chandra Dhari Singh

Judge of Allahabad High Court
- Incumbent
- Assumed office 7 April 2025
- Nominated by: Sanjiv Khanna
- Appointed by: Droupadi Murmu
- In office 22 September 2017 – 10 October 2021
- Nominated by: Dipak Misra
- Appointed by: Ramnath Kovind

Judge of Delhi High Court
- In office 11 October 2021 – 6 April 2025
- Nominated by: N. V. Ramana
- Appointed by: Ramnath Kovind

Personal details
- Born: July 12, 1969 (age 57) Sultanpur, Uttar Pradesh
- Education: L.L.B. L.L.M.
- Alma mater: Delhi University; National Law University, Jodhpur

Chandra Dhari Singh (born 13 July 1969) is a judge of the Allahabad High Court in the state of Uttar Pradesh, India. He is also former judge of Delhi High Court serving there between October 2021 and April 2025.

== Early life and career ==
Justice C. D. Singh was born in Sultanpur, Uttar Pradesh. He completed his law education from Delhi University in 1993 and from National Law University, Jodhpur through Distance learning. He enrolled as an advocate on 20 July 1994 and also became Advocate-on-Record in 2001 and practised in Supreme Court of India.

He served as standing counsel for various states such as Madhya Pradesh, Jharkhand, and Uttar Pradesh. He was also appointed as Additional Advocate General of Chhattisgarh.

He was also elected as joint secretary of the Supreme Court Bar Association and secretary of the Supreme Court Advocate-on-Record Association.

== As Judge ==
He was appointed as an Additional Judge at the Allahabad High Court on 22 September 2017 and later confirmed as Permanent Judge on 6 September 2019.

He was transferred to Delhi High Court on 11 October 2021 and was again proposed to be repatriated to Allahabad High Court by Supreme Court Collegium in November 2024. This proposal was cleared by Central Government in March 2025.
