= Raghunath Mohapatra =

Indian architect and sculptor (1943–2021)

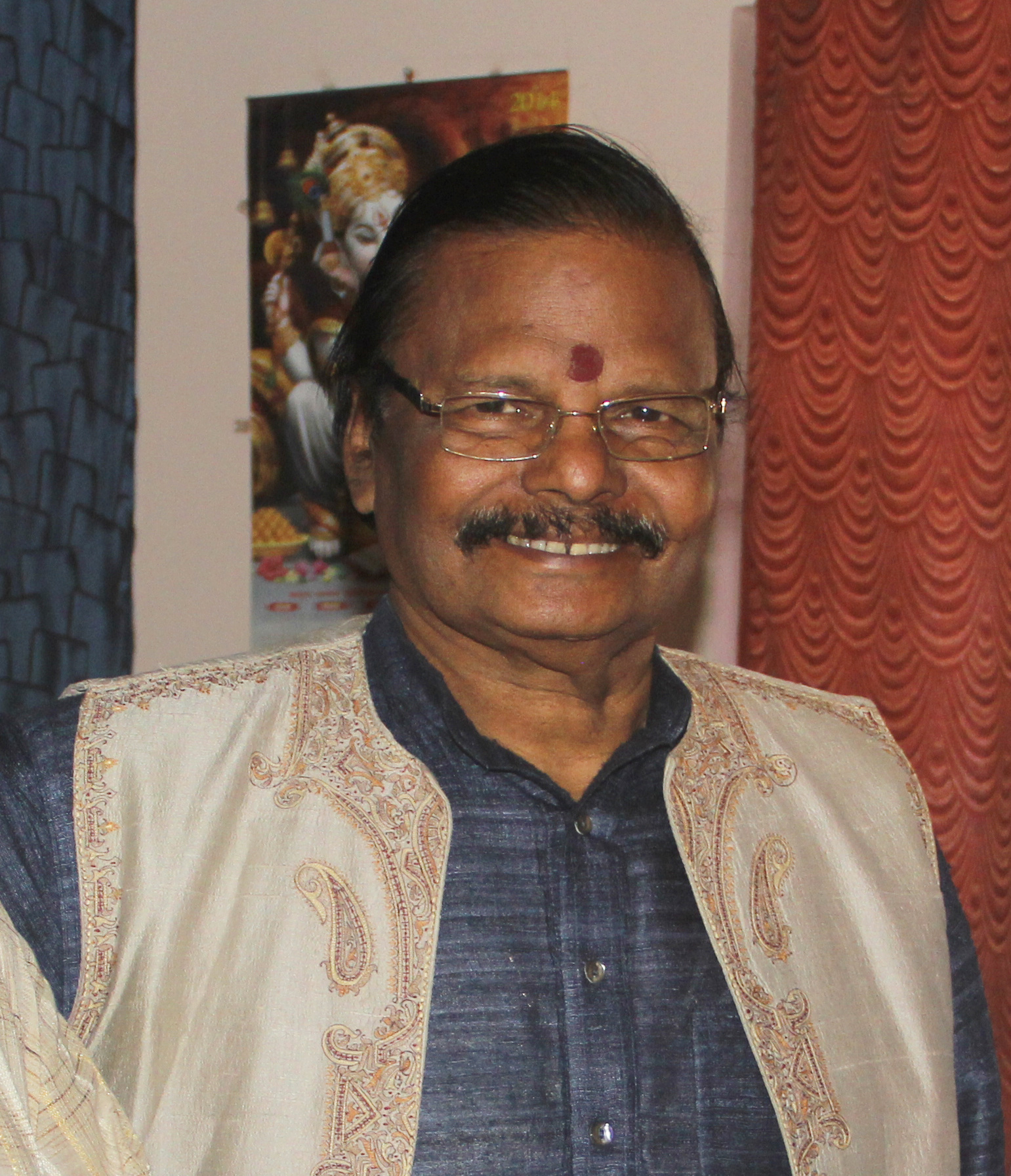

Member of Rajya Sabha
- In office 14 July 2018 – 9 May 2021
- Preceded by: Anu Aga
- Succeeded by: Mahesh Jethmalani
- Constituency: Nominated (Arts)

Personal details
- Born: 24 March 1943 Sasan Padia, Puri, Odisha
- Died: 9 May 2021 (aged 78) Bhubaneswar AIIMS, Odisha, India
- Spouse: Rajani Mohapatra (m. 1966)
- Children: 5
- Education: 8th
- Occupation: Architect, sculptor
- Awards: Member of Parliament, Rajya Sabha, 2018 Padma Vibhushan, 2013; Padma Bhusan, 2001; Padma Sri, 1976

Raghunath Mohapatra (24 March 1943 – 9 May 2021) was an Indian architect, sculptor, and a Nominated Member of Rajya Sabha. He was awarded Padma Shri in 1975 and Padma Bhushan in 2001. He was awarded Padma Vibhushan in 2013 on occasion of the 64th Republic Day of India.

== Biography ==
Born in Puri (Odisha), Mohapatra was awarded Padma Shri by the then President of India Fakiruddin Ali Ahmed in 1976 and also received the Padma Bhushan award in 2001.

He was nominated by the Ministry of External Affairs, Government of India as a Member of the Indian Council for Cultural Relations (ICCR) in 2000.

He served as a Senior Instructor and Superintendent of Handicraft Training & Designing center, Government of Odisha, Bhubaneswar since 1963.

A pioneering figure in the world of sculpture and a Padma Vibhusan awardee – second highest civilian honour after the Bharat Ratna – the 78-year-old icon was born into a Biswakarma family in Puri's Pathuria Sahi. As a young boy who feared going to school, he dropped out in Class III to carry forward his family's legacy. His initial training in sculpting began at the age of eight under his grandfather Aparti Mohapatra, a sculptor who worked with the royal family of Puri for the upkeep of Shri Jagannath Temple.

Although he did not have any formal training in sculpture, Mohapatra was an encyclopedia on Shilpa Sastra and began sculpting idols based on religious Hindu iconography from an early age. His passion for stone sculpting was a strong one which remained unwavering until his last breath. What made his craft unique is Mohapatra never took the help of machines and the only tools he used were a chisel and a hammer.

In the 1960s when he was only 20, Mohapatra carved stone idols of deities and devadasis and sold them on the streets of Pathuria Sahi. The beauty of his craft came to the notice of officials of Handicraft Training and Designing Centre at Bhubaneswar and they offered him a trainer's job in the institute. Here, he went on to become a senior instructor, a master craftsman and superintendent of the institute.

A decade after, he won the prestigious Padma Shri in 1974 for creating a six-feet-tall grey stone statue of Sun god which is displayed at the Central Hall of Parliament. Twenty-seven years later in 2001, Mohapatra was honoured with the Padma Bhushan. And in 2013, he was awarded the Padma Vibhushan for his contribution towards enriching the field of stone sculpting.

In the period between, the legendary craftsman went on to create several masterpieces like Buddha statues in white sandstone at Dhauligiri Shanti Stupa, Konark horses at the Barabati Stadium and Master Canteen, Mukteswar Gate at Surajkund and a gigantic lotus at Rajiv Gandhi's samadhi at Vir Bhumi, both in New Delhi besides, Buddha statues in monasteries at Ladakh, Japan and Paris. Within Odisha, one of his most ambitious works was the Tara Tarini temple in Ganjam district which he built as per the ancient Kalinga temple architecture style. Mohapatra also built Jagannath temples at Nigeria, Bangalore, Balasore, a Laxmi temple in Visakhapatnam and a Sai temple in Jharsuguda.

After being nominated to the Rajya Sabha in 2018, Mohapatra continued to mentor budding sculptors. He trained thousands of youths from within Odisha and other states in traditional sculpting and temple designing at his workshop at Sisupalgarh square on the outskirts of Bhubaneswar.

He dreamt of building another Sun temple. In 2018, he had laid the foundation stone for his dream project – an 'Adityanarayan' temple – near Satyabadi along Puri-Bhubaneswar Highway. The temple, he had said, would resemble the Sun temple at Konark. He, however, could never begin work on making the dream a reality. As the news of his death due to COVID-19 spread on Sunday evening, leaders across the country including the Prime Minister and Chief Minister, artists and art lovers from across the nation paid tributes to the sculptor.

He died in Bhubaneshwar in May 2021 of a coronavirus infection during the 2020–21 pandemic.

== Awards ==
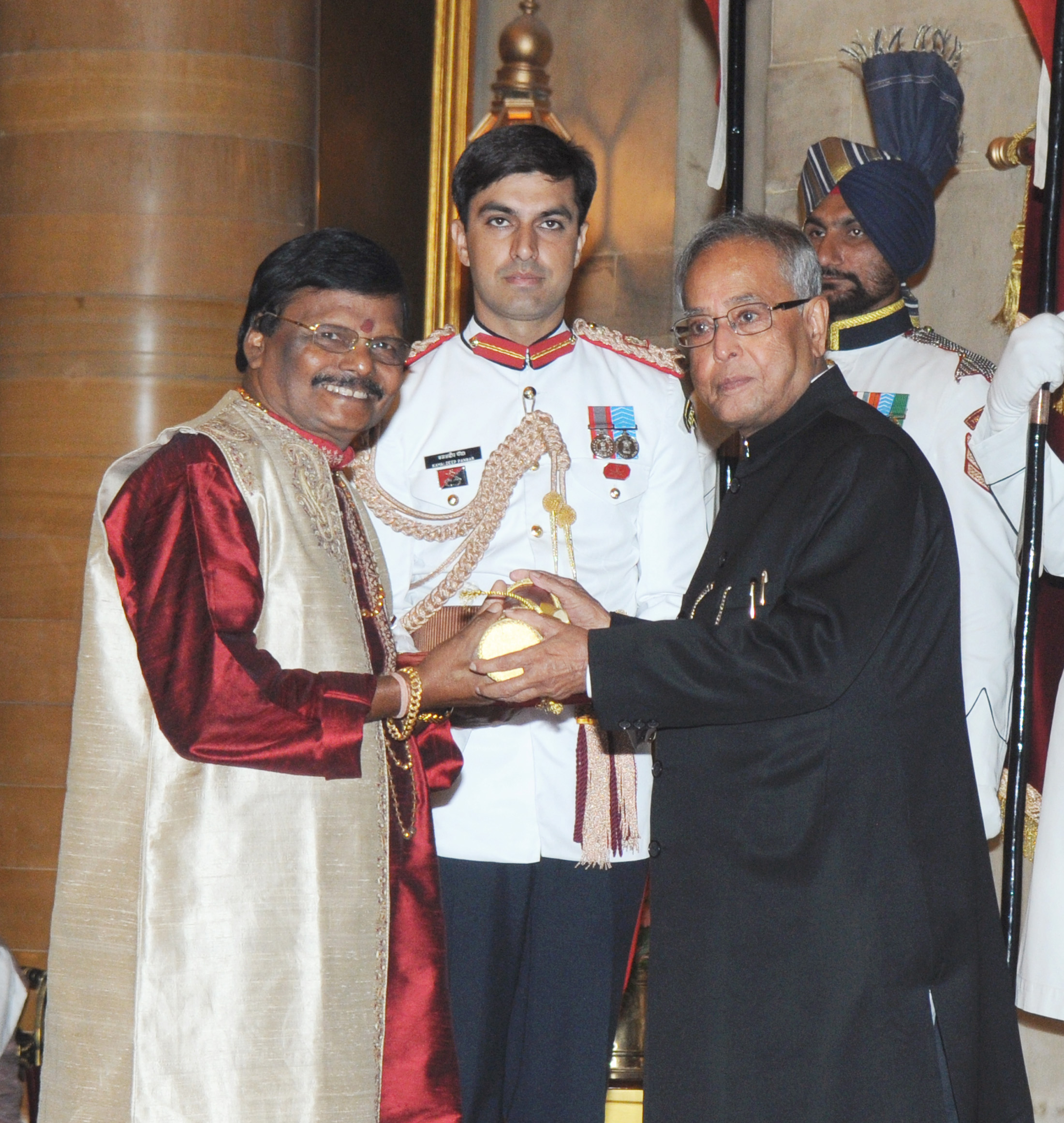
The President, Shri Pranab Mukherjee presenting the Padma Vibhushan Award to Shri Raghunath Mohapatra, at an Investiture Ceremony, at Rashtrapati Bhavan, in New Delhi on April 05, 2013

- Padma Vibhushan, 2013
- Padma Bhushan, 2001
- Padma Shri, 1976
- National Award for Sculpture, 1964
