= M. N. Krishnamani =

Indian lawyer (1948–2017)

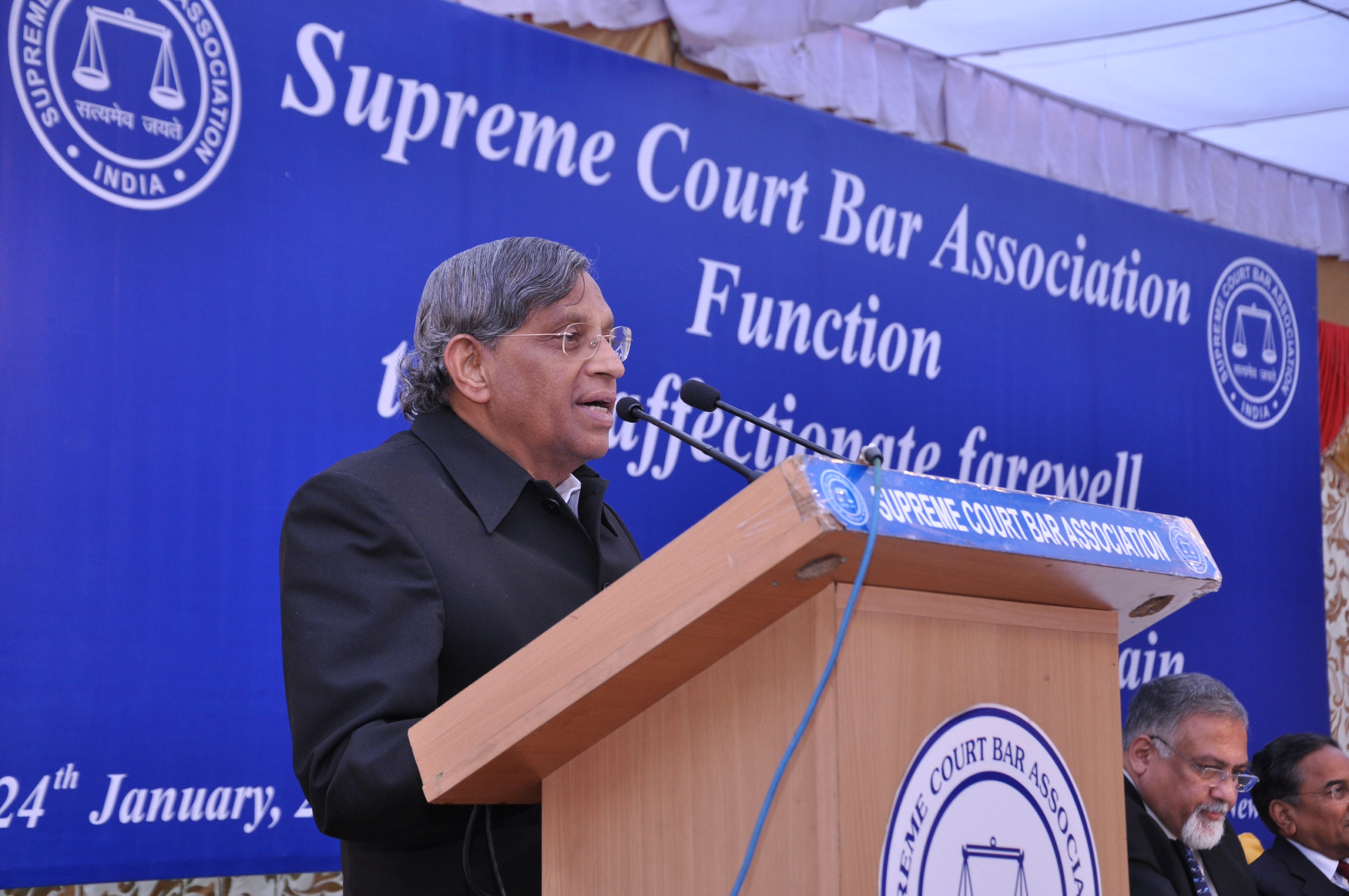
- M N Krishnamani at a SCBA function

Former President of Supreme Court Bar Association of India

Maharajapuram Natarajan Krishnamani (26 April 1948 – 15 February 2017) was an Indian senior counsel practicing at the Supreme Court of India and a former president of Supreme Court Bar Association of India.

== Early life ==
Maharajapuram Natarajan Krishnamani had his education in Ramakrishna Mission boy's High School, Vaishnav College, Presidency College and Law College, Madras. Under his father's influence, he evinced interest in spirituality from childhood. Even while studying in 9th standard when he was less than 14 years, he used to give musical discourses in Madras at various places on may spiritual topics. All the boys who played musical instruments for him were his class-mates. He was appreciated by the then Chief Minister of Tamil Nadu on 3 March 1963 when The latter saw him giving a musical discourse on the life story of Swami Vivekananda during Swami Vivekananda's Centenary Celebrations. In all school functions, he used to do mimicry. He did his pre-university course from Vaishnava College, Madras. He did BSc in geology from the Presidency College, Madras and then Law from Madras Law College, Madras.

== Career ==
He was enrolled as a lawyer in 1971, in Madras. He worked as a junior of Late Sri. M.K. Nambiyar and Sri. K.K. Venugopal (Sri. Nambiyar's son who is a doyen of the Supreme Court Bar, today) between 1971 and 1977. In 1977 he set up his practice as an independent lawyer. He started his practice in the Madras High Court and had wide range of work in different fields of law and was prominent as a young lawyer from 1971 to 1981 in Madras (now Chennai). He specialised in Writ Jurisdiction and was known as : "Writ a day lawyer" since he was appearing in at least one Writ Petition a day. In 1981 he shifted his practice to Delhi to practice in the Supreme Court of India. He appeared in several important cases which were widely reported in law reports and in the Media as well.

He has appeared in almost all the High Courts located in different States in India. He has appeared for Union of India, different State Governments, Statutory Authorities and Nationalized Banks before the Supreme Court of India. He appeared before Justice Verma Commission and Justice Jain Commission in re Rajiv Gandhi's assassination on behalf of certain leaders of the Congress Party. He appeared for Tamil Nadu Govt, before Justice Nag Commission and Justice Devendra Gupta Commission in connection with the Ban on LTTE. He was also the Senior Standing Counsel for Delhi Development Authority. He has been regularly appearing as Senior Advocate for the Bar Council of India before the Supreme Court of India.

He also appeared in Ram Janma Bhoomi case in Allahabad High Court's Full Bench on behalf of the Hindus. It is after hearing him in Full Bench decided to take on record the ACI's report on excavations in the disputed spot which was the turning point in the case. He also appeared in Ram Sethu matter on behalf of the Hindus. It was during his arguments a turning point came in the said case also. The court directed the Union of India to find out whether any way to Sri Lanka could be found without breaking the Ram Sethu. After this a committee of experts appointed by UOI has submitted in report to the effect that the way which has to be made by breaking Ram Sethu was not in feasible one and that another route which does not interfere with the Sethu was the only feasible way. The matter is still pending in Supreme Court.

== Politics ==
He had a brief political career during 1969–1975. He joined the Indian National Congress in 1969. He became the General Secretary of Law College Student Congress in the Madras Law College. Later he became the vice-president of Youth Congress in Madras. During this period, he was a Trade Union Leader as well. Rangarajan Kumaramangalam and Krishnamani organised the Hotel Employees for this first time and were running the Hotel Employees Union successfully. In 1975 he left politics and plunged into spirituality, education and social work, besides continuing in Legal Profession having active practice in different branches of Law.

== Leadership ==
He was four times vice-president at the Supreme Court, four times, President of the Supreme Court Bar Association and President of Delhi Tamil Sangam several times, representing over 1.2 million Tamils in Delhi. He is one of the founder members of Veda Parishad. he is the General Secretary of Sanaatan Sangeet Sanskriti and the Treasurer of Sardar Patel Society. He is connected with several cultural, spiritual and social organisations in Delhi. He was the President of Delhi Tamil Education Association running 7 schools in the capital of India, with over 1000 students in each of these schools. He was a Visiting Faculty in the School of Planning and Architecture (a Deemed university) taking classes for Post Graduate students in building law, contract law, Mercantile Law and Ethics of an Architect. He was a member of the Governing Council of National Law School. Bangalore for 3 years till 2006. He was the Member of the Governing Body of Bopal Law School for three years.

== Awards ==
He received the "National Law Day Award" for Excellence in Civil Law in 1998. He was given the prestigious "Seva-Ratna Award" by the Centenarian Trust in 2005. He was given "Secular India Harmony Award" in 2005. He was awarded "Sreshta Kala Pracharak Award" by Ganesh Natyalaya and Gayatri Fine Arts Society in 2009. He was awarded Padma Shri in the field of Public Affairs by Government of India in the year 2016.

== Conferment of L.L.D. degree ==
In 2011 the North Orissa University, Baripada, Orissa recognised his contributions in the field of law and conferred the degree of Doctor of Laws (Honoris Causa) on him. In this document conferring the Doctorate on Mr. Krishnamani, it is mentioned inter alia as follows:

Your period in politics during your student days and trade unionism ended after meeting Sri Navajata of Sri Aurobindo Ashram, Pondicherry. Following that, you focused on spiritualism and social work while continuing to practice law. You have appeared in cases in the Supreme Court of India and various High Courts.

"A lawyer with a human face championing the cause of the common people by delivering justice at their doorstep, you have had an indisputable trace record as the President of the Supreme Court Bar Association in addition to holding several other important portfolios."

== Recognition ==
Krishnamani served as president of the Supreme Court Bar Association.

In 2016, the Government of India awarded him the Padma Shri for his contributions to public affairs.

== Author ==
His books "Bhajgovindam" and "Godlymen and their Golden Words" are published by the Rashtriya Sanskrit Sansthan Education Ministry of Union of India. His other books include "Shankara-the Revolutionary", "Essence of Gita" "Aryan-Dravidian Myth", "From Doubt to Certainty", "Premopanishad", "Sai on Himself " and "How can you miss the omnipresent" and "Glory of Kanchi Mutt". His three other books viz "Autobiography of an Avtara", "Religious Freedom", and "Quintessenceof Hinduism" are under print. He is also a composer with 45 poems at his credit. Mr. Krishnamani has been writing erudite articles consistently in Bhavans Journal published by Bharatiya Vidya Bhawan (so far over 70 of his articles have been published in Bhavan Journal).

== Personal life and death ==
His son, Anirudh Sainath was an artist with many paintings to his credit (https://molee.devianrt.com/). His three daughters are lawyers. They are married to software engineers working in leading multinational companies. His wife Radha was a Bharata Natyam dancer and a good bhajan singer. She was a great devotee of Bhagwan Sri Sathya Sai Baba.

Krishnamani died on 9 October 2017, at the age of 68.
