= Centre for Public Interest Litigation =

- Type: NGO
- Region served: India
- Key people: V. M. Tarkunde, Prashant Bhushan

The Centre for Public Interest Litigation (CPIL) is an Indian non-governmental organisation that conducts litigation on matters of public interest. The CPIL was established by late Justice V. M. Tarkunde, a former judge of the Supreme Court of India.

== Background ==
In India, anybody can file a Public Interest Litigation (PIL) suit on behalf of a group of people whose rights are being affected, typically one of the weaker segments of the community. The PILs are filed in a high court against state or public authorities that have caused a public wrong or injury through some act or omission. The person filing the PIL does not have to have a direct interest in the suit. The CPIL was founded in the late 1980s by V.M. Tarkunde, who was also the founder of the People's Union for Civil Liberties. V.M. Tarkunde was the first president. Other founder members were senior advocates including Fali Sam Nariman, Shanti Bhushan, Anil Divan, Rajinder Sachar and Colin Gonsalves.

== Sample cases ==
In October 1997, the Delhi High Court heard a CPIL petition over the award of contracts to Enron and Reliance Industries develop the Panna-Mukta oilfield, and issued notices to the involved companies and government organisations. Prashant Bhushan acted as advocate for CPIL. The petition claimed an inquiry was justified on the basis of testimony that Reliance had bribed the minister of petroleum, Satish Sharma, to get the award.

In 2002, the CPIL asked for scrutiny of a proposed Freedom of Information bill to determine whether the bill gave citizens sufficient power to find out about governance. The government had been reluctant to recognise that the people had a right to know, and after the CPIL filing it rushed through the bill without correcting known defects.

The CPIL won a major victory in 2003 when the Supreme Court restrained the Central government from privatising Hindustan Petroleum and Bharat Petroleum without the approval of Parliament. As counsel for the CPIL, Rajinder Sachar said that the only way to disinvest in the companies would be to repeal or amend the Acts by which they were nationalised in the 1970s. As a result, the government would need a majority in both houses to push through any privatisation.

In October 2004, the CPIL filed a petition with the Supreme Court in which they challenged a clause of the constitution related to reservation benefits. Under this clause, such benefits only went to people who professed faith in Hinduism, Sikhism or Buddhism. Specifically at issue was the question of Scheduled Castes being deprived of benefits if they converted to Christianity.

In 2007, Prashant Bhushan of the CPIL filed a petition with the Delhi High Court to investigate whether there had been kickbacks in the 2005 Scorpene submarine deal. The High Court took a strong line with the investigating agency, saying "We feel dissatisfied with that you've done so far. If you've tried to shield someone, then we will come down very heavily on you".

The CPIL won another victory in 2011 with a challenge to the appointment of P. J. Thomas as Central Vigilance Commissioner. On 3 March 2011 the Supreme Court held that Thomas was not eligible since he was facing a criminal case in Kerala.

=== 2G Spectrum Case ===
The CPIL is best known for taking the lead in filing a suit against the Government of India for irregularities in a major award of spectrum for 2G mobile telephones. The CPIL petition alleged that the government had lost $15.53 billion by issuing spectrum in 2008 based on 2001 prices, and by not following a competitive bidding process. In February 2012, the Supreme Court decided in their favor and declared the allocation of spectrum had been illegal.

== See also ==
- 2G spectrum case
