= Arnesh Kumar Guidelines =

Indian Supreme Court ruling of 2014

- Court: Supreme Court of India
- Full case name: Arnesh Kumar vs State of Bihar
- Decided: 2014
- Citation: 2014 8 SCC 273

Case history
- Appealed from: Judgement of Patna High Court

Court membership
- Judges sitting: Chandramauli Kumar Prasad, Pinaki Chandra Ghose

Case opinions
- Decision by: Chandramauli Kumar Prasad
- Concurrence: Chandramauli Kumar Prasad, Pinaki Chandra Ghose

Arnesh Kumar vs State of Bihar (2014), also known as Arnesh Kumar Guidelines, is a landmark judgement of the Indian Supreme Court, stating arrests should be an exception, in cases where the punishment is less than seven years of imprisonment. The guidelines asked the police to determine whether an arrest was necessary under the provisions of Section 41 of the Criminal Procedure Code (CrPC). Police officers have a responsibility to guarantee that the principles established by the Supreme Court in its numerous decisions are followed by the investigating officers. Before authorising further detention, the judicial magistrate must read the police officer's report and make sure they are satisfied.

The decision was welcomed by men's right activists but was criticised by women rights activists.

Legal proceedings can be initiated against the police officials if the procedure for arrest under Section 41A CrPC and Arnesh Kumar Guidelines are violated.

== Background ==
In 1983, Section 498A was enacted, together with Section 304B on dowry deaths, to combat the threat of rising dowry deaths and violence against married women by their in-laws.

In 2010, the Supreme Court asked the government to amend the dowry law to stop its misuse. The dowry laws, particularly the section 498A of the Indian Penal Code is observed by many in India as being prone to misuse because of mechanical arrests by the police. The criticism of these laws has been growing. According to the National Crime Records Bureau statistics, in 2012, around 200,000 people including 47,951 women, were arrested in dowry related cases but only 15% of the accused were convicted. The period between 2006 and 2015, has seen a continuous fall in the conviction rate for cases, filed under this section. It has the lowest conviction rate among all the crimes under Indian Penal Code.

In 2005, Section 498A IPC was upheld by the Supreme Court of India when it was challenged. In 2010, the Supreme Court spoke about the misuse of anti-dowry laws in Preeti Gupta & Another v. State of Jharkhand & Another and more detailed investigation was recommended. Following the observations of the Supreme Court Indian parliament set up a committee headed by Bhagat Singh Koshyari.

== Judgement ==
On 2 July 2014, the Supreme Court framed the guidelines the response to a Special Leave Petition (SLP) filed by one Arnesh Kumar challenging his arrest and of his family under this law. In the case of Arnesh Kumar v. State of Bihar & Anr., a two-judge bench of the Supreme Court reviewed the enforcement of section 41(1)(A) of CrPC which instructs state of following certain procedure before arrest. The bench observed that the Section 498A had become a powerful weapon for disgruntled wives, where innocent people were arrested without any evidence due to non-bailable and cognizable nature of the law. The Supreme Court said that the anti-dowry law (Section 498A) is being used by some women to harass their husbands and in-laws. The court prohibited the police from making arrests on the mere basis of a complaint. The court asked the police to follow Section 41 of the Code of Criminal Procedure, 1973, which provides a 9-point checklist which must be used to decide the need for an arrest. The court also said that a magistrate must decide whether an arrested accused is needed to be kept under further detention.

== Reaction ==
Others welcomed the decision as landmark judgment to uphold the human rights of innocent people. The decision received criticism from feminists because it weakened the negotiating power of women.

== Aftermath ==
In 2014, it was reported that due to the lack of communication to police stations, the Arnesh Kumar Guidelines by Supreme Court of India were not followed.

In May 2021, the amicus curiae submitted that the Madhya Pradesh Police were not following the Arnesh Kumar guidelines. Madhya Pradesh High Court ordered that the Director general of police (DGP) must issue directions to Police to follow the Arnesh Kumar Guidelines. The accused who were arrested without following the Arnesh Kumar Guidelines were entitled to apply for regular bail citing the violation of the guidelines. The court also asked the State Judicial Academy to spread awareness of the Arnesh Kumar Guidelines among the police officers and judicial magistrates.

In 2021 due to the overcrowding of prisons during the second wave of the COVID-19 pandemic in India, the Supreme Court said no arrests should be made in violation of the Arnesh Kumar Guidelines.

In November 2021, while hearing a petition from a Hyderabad resident, Telangana High Court granted the petitioner, liberty to start legal proceedings against the police officials if the procedure for arrest under Section 41A CrPC and Arnesh Kumar Guidelines are violated. The bench noted, "Hence, police are directed to adhere to the procedure Contemplated under Section 41-A Cr.P.C. and also the guidelines issued by the Apex Court in Arnesh Kumar's case (supra) scrupulously. Any deviation in this regard will be viewed seriously."

In a significant judgment on 4 January, the Delhi High Court held a police officer guilty of contempt of court for arresting a man in violation of the principles laid down by the Supreme Court in the case Arnesh Kumar vs State of Bihar. The Court sentenced the police officer to one-day imprisonment for contempt of court.

In August 2022 Allahabad HC Holds Police Officer Guilty Of Contempt For Violating 'Arnesh Kumar Guidelines', Sentences Him To 14 Day Imprisonment.
