= Mahesh Jethmalani =

Indian politician and lawyer

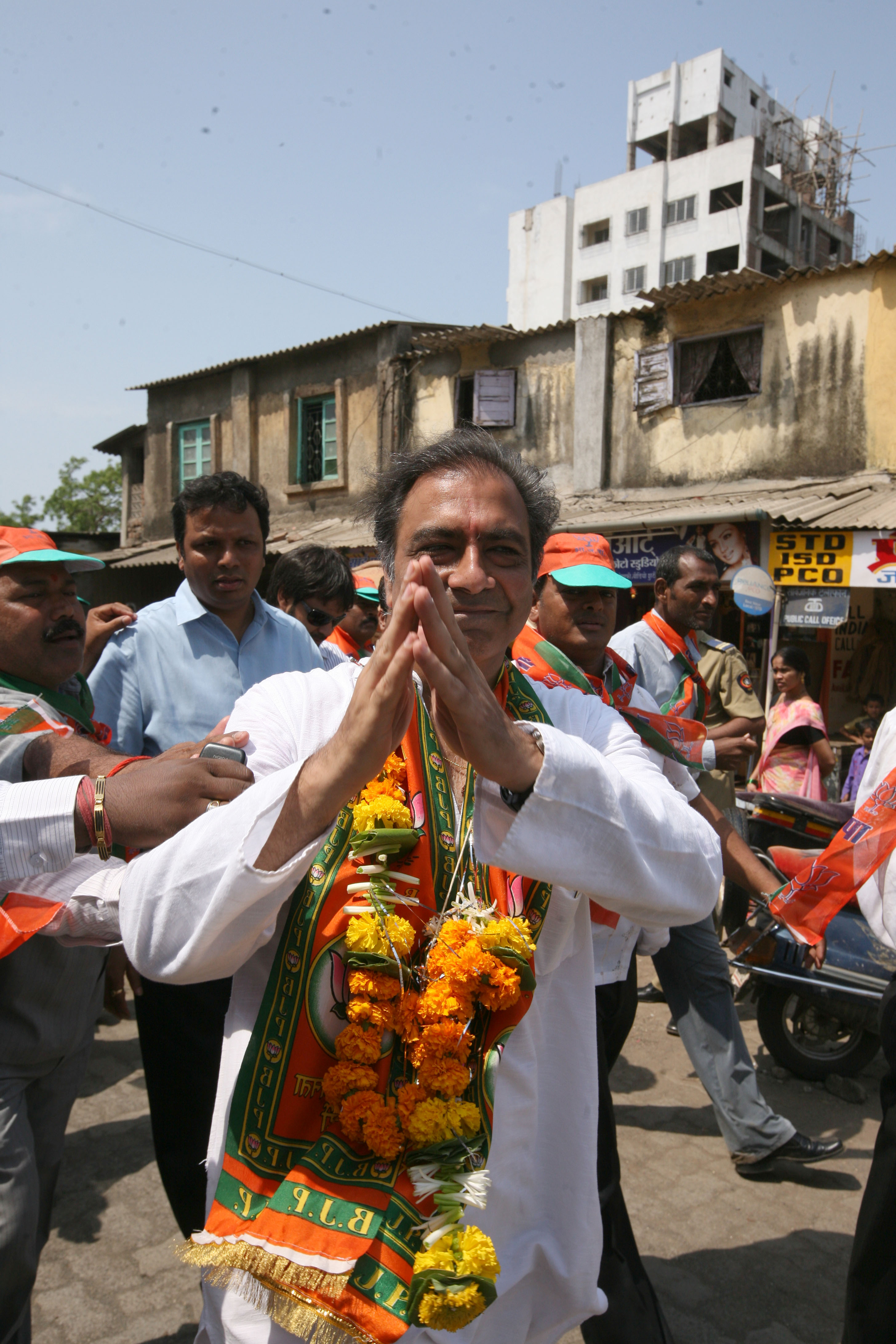
- Mahesh Jethmalani campaigning during 2009 general elections

Member of Parliament, Rajya Sabha
- In office 1 June 2021 – 13 July 2024
- Preceded by: Raghunath Mohapatra
- Succeeded by: Ujjwal Nikam
- Constituency: Nominated (Law)

Personal details
- Born: 9 August 1956 (age 70) Mumbai, Maharashtra, India
- Party: Bharatiya Janata Party
- Spouse: Haseena Jethmalani
- Parent: Ram Jethmalani (father)
- Education: St. Xavier's College, Mumbai, University of Oxford
- Profession: Advocate

Mahesh Jethmalani (born 9 August 1956) is an Indian lawyer and a politician. He is currently a nominated Member of Parliament in the Rajya Sabha. He was also a member of the National Executive of the Bharatiya Janata Party up to 2012.

== Early life and education ==
Jethmalani was born in 1956. His father was a popular advocate turned Union Minister Ram Jethmalani. He did his schooling at St. Paul's School, Darjeeling. He has done his BA from the St. Xavier's College, Mumbai, and a tripos in PPE (Politics, Philosophy & Economics) at the University of Oxford. He studied law in London and qualified as a barrister in 1980.

== Career in law ==
Jethmalani studied law in London under the patronage of the UK Bar. He qualified as a barrister in 1980. Jethmalani enrolled at the bar of Bombay High Court on 12 February 1981.

He has handled several critical criminal and civil cases like the trial of former Chief Minister of Maharashtra, A. R. Antulay. He also appealed before the Court for the two accused in Assassination of Indira Gandhi.

He represented Birla family in the Priyamvada Birla case and has also appeared for Anil Ambani in the Reliance Case.

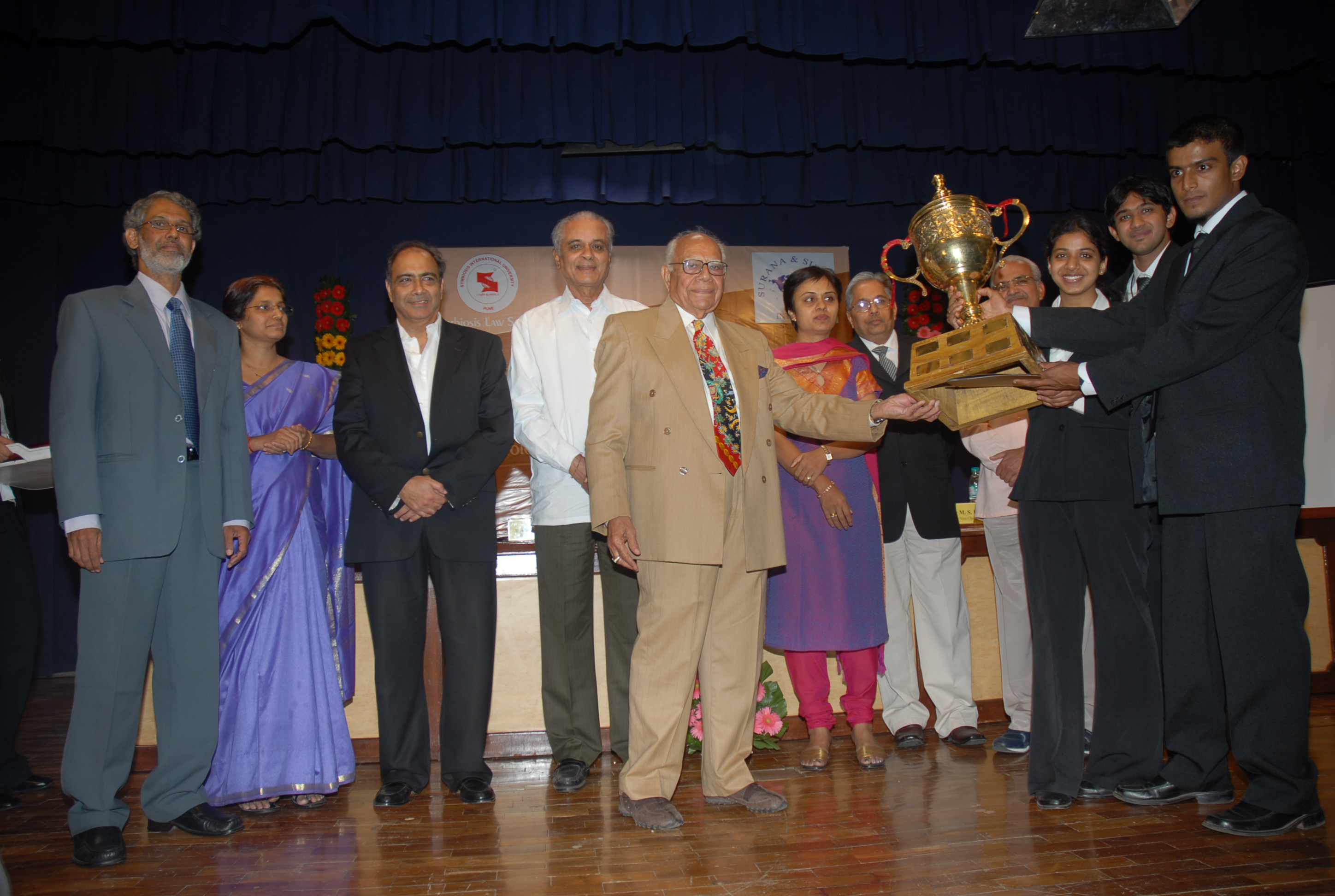
Mahesh Jethmalani (third from left) with father Ram Jethmalani (center)

Jethmalani represented Chief Minister Narendra Modi in the Gujarat Riot Cases in Supreme Court of India. As well as Gujarat Home Minister, Amit Shah in the Sohrabuddin Murder Case in the Gujarat High Court and the Supreme Court of India.

He also appeared for the bail plea of Sanjay Dutt. Jethmalani had also appeared for Harshad Mehta in several cases. He also represents former Police Commissioner of Mumbai, Param Bir Singh against the Maha Vikas Aghadi government.

== Political life ==
He unsuccessfully contested the 2009 Indian general elections from the Mumbai North Central (Lok Sabha constituency) as a Bharatiya Janata Party candidate.

Jethmalani quit the BJP National Executive in 2012 after differences with BJP President Nitin Gadkari.

In 2021, he was nominated as a Member of Parliament, Rajya Sabha by the President of India.
