= Anil B. Divan =

Indian lawyer (1930–2017)

- Born: 15 May 1930; India
- Died: 20 March 2017 (aged 86)
- Occupation: Lawyer

Anil B. Divan (15 May 1930 – 20 March 2017) was a senior advocate in India. He has been described as an eminent constitutional expert.

== Life and career ==
Anil B. Divan was born on 15 May 1930 and died 20 March 2017. He was president of Law Asia from 1991 to 1993. From February 2009 he was Associate President of the Bar Association of India. He argued in the Supreme Court of India on a "pro bono" basis in many Public Interest Litigations (PILs), some involving high-level corruption, as an "Amicus Curiae". In 2004 he was a member of the committee on Water Resources Law of the International Law Association. He has been appointed by the government to help resolve Cauvery Water Disputes.

In the late 1980s, Divan was one of the founders of the Centre for Public Interest Litigation, a Non-governmental organization that conducts litigation on matters of public interest. The first president was Justice V. M. Tarkunde, who was also the founder of the People's Union for Civil Liberties. Other founder members were senior advocates including Fali Sam Nariman, Shanti Bhushan, Rajinder Sachar and Colin Gonsalves.

In February 2005, Prashant Bhushan and Anil B. Divan were counsel for the Centre for Public Interest Litigation (CPIL) seeking quashing of the CVC Act, 2003, which requires the CBI to obtain permission from the Union government before registering corruption cases against senior bureaucrats. Bhushan argued that the act violated the basic rights of citizens and was counter to the rule of law. The Supreme Court referred the question to a constitution bench of five judges. Divan was a member of the Committee on Judicial Accountability. Commenting on the Judges Enquiry Bill, 2006, he said "The aforementioned new bill is worse than the old Judges Inquiry Act and it needs to be scrapped in toto. This new bill is nothing but a sham". Divan's son Shyam Divan is also a lawyer practising in the Supreme Court. His daughter-in-law, Madhavi Goradia Divan is an author of books on law and also a practising lawyer.
