= Soumitra Sen =

Indian judge

Soumitra Sen is a former judge of the Calcutta High Court. He was the first judge in independent India whose removal motion was passed in Rajya Sabha for misappropriation of funds.

== History ==
He was born on 22 January 1958. He passed the High School Leaving Certificate Examination from the Don Bosco High School, Guwahati in Assam. Later he earned a Bachelor of Commerce degree from the Gauhati Commerce College, an affiliated college of Gauhati University.

He also pursued a law degree (LL.B.) from the University College of Law, of the University of Calcutta. He would later enroll as an Advocate on 13 February 1984. He practiced in civil and constitutional matters in both the Original Side and Appellate Side of the High Court at Calcutta and was elevated as a permanent Judge of the High Court at Calcutta on 3 December 2003.

== Allegation ==
Justice Sen has been bearing the allegation of appropriating Rs 3.2 million as a court-appointed receiver in 1993 in a lawsuit between Steel Authority of India Limited (SAIL) and Shipping Corporation of India over supply of fire bricks.

The Chief Justice recommendation was made shortly after a three-judge inquiry committee had established Sen's misconduct in depositing the money in his personal account. Sen retained the money even after being appointed the High Court judge in 2003. It was in 2006 after an HC order, that he returned the money.

== Removal ==
Justice Sen was held guilty of misappropriation of public funds he received in his capacity as receiver appointed by the High Court of Calcutta and misrepresenting facts with regard to it by a committee of three judges set up by former CJI K. G. Balakrishnan in 2007. A year later, Justice Balakrishnan recommended his impeachment to the PM, after which a legal opinion obtained by the law ministry endorsed the judges' committee report.

In 2009, 58 MPs of the Rajya Sabha moved a motion for impeachment of Calcutta High Court Judge Soumitra Sen for his involvement in financial misappropriation. Probe panel was set up by Rajya Sabha chairman Hamid Ansari in February 2009. It was headed by SC judge Justice B Sudershan Reddy and had as its members Punjab and Haryana High Court Chief Justice Mukul Mudgal and noted Jurist Fali S. Nariman. The Committee said the charges were duly proved.

The report of the three-member committee, placed in both Houses of Parliament, said it was of the opinion that Justice Sen was 'guilty of misbehaviour' under Article 124(4) read with proviso (b) to Article 217(1) of the Constitution of India.

Article 124(4) when read with proviso (b) to Article 217(1) states that a judge of a high court shall not be removed from his office except on the grounds of 'proved misbehaviour'. The prefix 'proved' only means proved to the satisfaction of requisite majority of Parliament, if so recommended by the inquiry committee.

The report said the oral and documentary evidence had established that two separate accounts were opened by Justice Sen as "receiver" in his own name and a total sum aggregating to Rs 33, 22, 800 being the sale proceeds of goods were brought into the two accounts between 24 March 1993 and 5 May 1995.

The indictment of Sen paved way for Parliament to take up the impeachment of the judge who had been found guilty of collecting Rs 33,22,800 from a purchaser of goods, keeping it in a savings bank account and misrepresenting facts to the high court.

Subash Bhattacharya the lawyer of Justice Soumitra Sen said that his client is innocent and he will prove he is innocent. As per the Judges Inquiry Act, the motion was moved in the Rajya Sabha and debated upon. Sen was given an opportunity to defend himself through his counsel. On 18 August 2011, Rajya Sabha passed the impeachment motion by overwhelming majority of 189 votes in favour and 17 against.

This is the second case in the history of the country in which Parliament has initiated proceedings for removal of a judge. The first involved V. Ramaswami.

== Resignation ==
Ahead of the impeachment motion against him in the Lok Sabha on 5 & 6 September 2011, he resigned on 1 September 2011. In his resignation letter he said that, "Since the Rajya Sabha has decided in its wisdom that he should not continue as a judge, he has decided not to go to the Lok Sabha, and put in his papers instead. He also would not go to the Supreme Court as he has no confidence on it." However Supreme Court has the power to review the decision made by the three-member committee formed by Speaker on the grounds of proved misbehaviour and incapacity. If it's not found appropriate in terms of misbehaviour and incapacity he can be restored as a judge and no further impeachment motion can be started before 6 months unless the judge has been found guilty by the court. Later, Lok Sabha decided to drop the impeachment proceedings against him because he had resigned.

On 15 January 2012, it became public through an RTI query that Justice Sen along with his other colleague facing similar accusations Justice P. D. Dinakaran will keep getting their post-retirement benefits, even though they resigned ahead of impeachment proceedings against them, as there are no Constitutional or statutory provisions restricting their entitlements in such a scenario.

== See also ==
- P. D. Dinakaran – former Chief Justice of the Sikkim High Court, against whom Parliament initiated impeachment proceedings.
- V. Ramaswami – former judge of the Supreme Court, who became the first judge against whom Parliament initiated impeachment proceedings.
- C. S. Karnan – former judge of the Calcutta High Court, who became the first judge of a high court to be punished for contempt of court while in office.
