= Press Council of India =

Statutory body in India

Press Council of India (PCI) is a statutory and quasi-judicial body in India, re-established in 1979 by the Press Council Act, 1978. Its objective is "preserving the freedom of the press by maintaining and improving the standards of newspapers and the news agencies" in India. It was initially set up in 1966 under the Indian Press Council Act, 1965, which was repealed in 1975. After abolishion during the Emergency, it was reestablished in 1979.

The council has a chairman – traditionally, a retired Supreme Court judge, and 28 additional members of which 20 are members of media, nominated by the newspapers, television channels and other media outlets operating in India. In the 28 member council, 5 are members of the lower house (Lok Sabha) and upper house (Rajya Sabha) of the Indian parliament and three represent culture literary and legal field as nominees of Sahitya Academy, University Grant Commission and Bar Council of India .

Justice Ranjana Prakash Desai is chairperson of the council as of 2022. The predecessor was Justice Chandramauli Kumar Prasad (2014–2022).

== Code of Ethics ==
The Press Council of India has issued the "Norms of Journalistic Conduct", which is one of two journalism-related codes in use in India.

== Complaints ==
The Press Council of India accepts complaints against and by the press in matters relating to a journalist's or media organisation's ethical failures. According to Kartik Sharma, the council can investigate and issue a report. It also can "warn, admonish, censure or disapprove" those it finds at fault, but it has no powers to enforce nor impose any penalty on individual journalists and publications.

On 21 July 2006, it censured three newspapers — Times of India (Delhi and Pune), Punjab Kesari (Delhi) and Mid-Day (Mumbai) — for violation of norms of journalistic conduct.

== Paid news ==
The Press Council of India conducted a limited study of the widespread practice of "paid news" in India in 2010. In a report issued in July 2010, it stated that "paid news" is a pervasive, structured and highly organised practice in Indian newspapers and other media outlets, where news space and favourable coverage is exchanged for money. It wrote, "paid news is a complex phenomenon and has acquired different forms over the last six decades [1950–2010]. It ranges from accepting gifts on various occasions, foreign and domestic junkets [trips], various monetary and non-monetary benefits, besides direct payment of money. Another form of paid news that has been brought to the notice of the Press Council of India by the Securities and Exchange Board of India (SEBI) is in the form of “private treaties” between media companies and corporate entities. Private treaty is a formal agreement between the media company and another non-media company in which the latter transfers certain shares of the company to the former in lieu of advertisement space and favourable coverage."

The 2010 investigation was limited to the 2009 elections by the Press Council of India. It found substantial evidence of corrupt practices and collusion between the Indian media, various politicians and political parties. It ruled that newspapers should not carry articles that report "enmity or hatred between people on the ground of religion, race, caste, community or language", refrain from critical statements on "personal character and conduct of a political candidate", refuse financial or indirect forms of compensation for political coverage among other voluntary guidelines.

However, pressure from the publishers' lobby forced PCI to suppress its investigation report which had named the media houses and politicians indulging in paid news. An RTI application seeking a copy of the report was also rejected by the PCI. The Central Information Commission (CIC), however, ordered the PCI to provide the report to the applicant and also make it publicly available on its website.

== See also ==
- Editors Guild of India
