= Pravin H. Parekh =

Counsel of the Supreme Court of India

Pravin H Parekh is a senior counsel practising at Supreme Court of India. He has been president of the Supreme Court Bar Association of India six times. In 2012, Parekh was conferred with Padma Shri, the fourth highest Indian civilian honour.
