= Fali Sam Nariman =

Indian jurist (1929–2024)

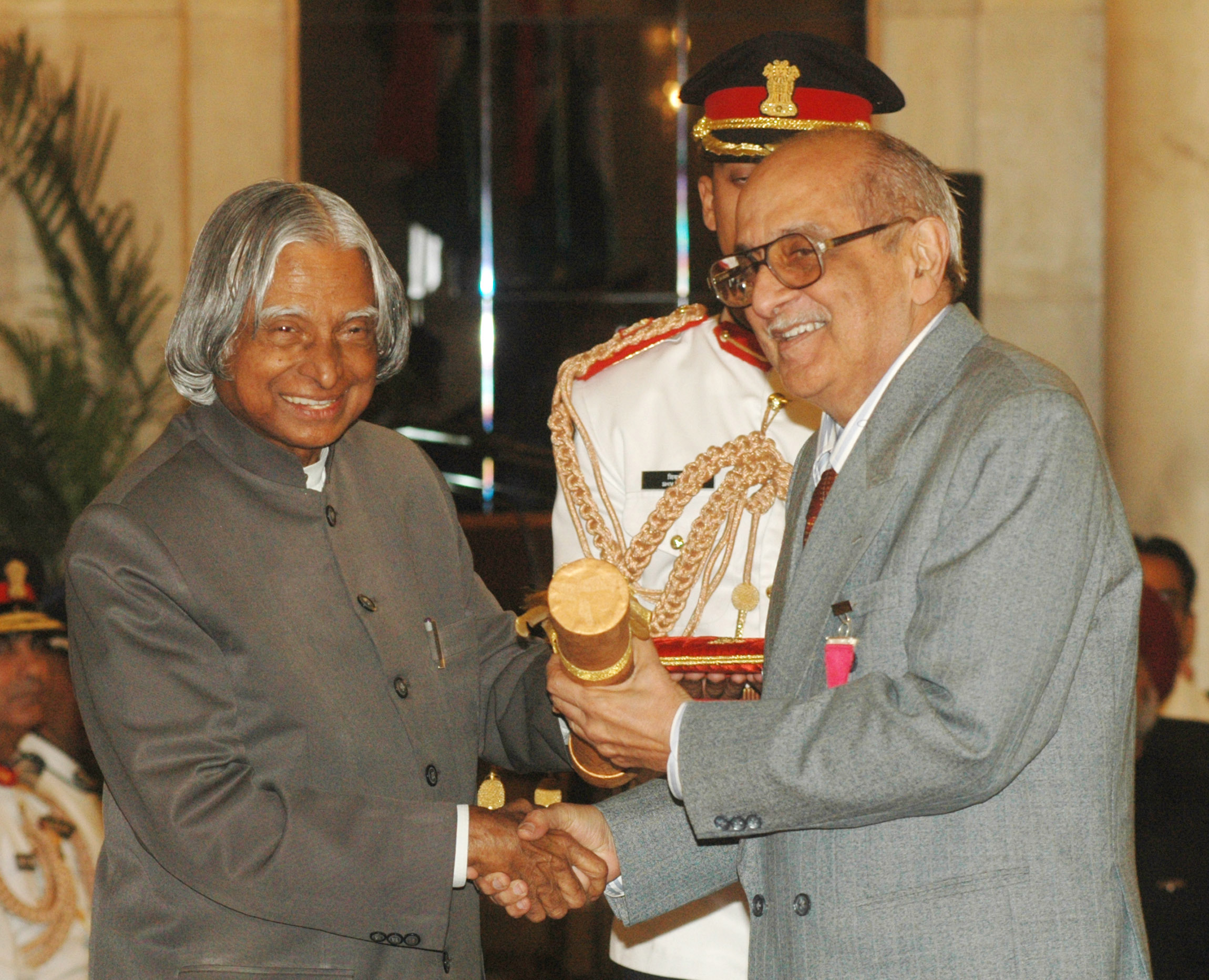
- The President, Dr. A. P. J. Abdul Kalam (left), presenting Padma Vibhushan to Shri Fali Sam Nariman on 23 March 2007.
- Born: 10 January 1929; Rangoon, Burma Province, British India (present-day Yangon, Myanmar)
- Died: 21 February 2024 (aged 95); New Delhi, India
- Education: University of Mumbai
- Occupations: Senior Advocate; Jurist
- Spouse: Bapsi F. Nariman
- Children: Rohinton Fali Nariman

Fali Sam Nariman (10 January 1929 – 21 February 2024) was an Indian jurist. He was a senior advocate to the Supreme Court of India from 1971 and was the President of the Bar Association of India from 1991 to 2010. Nariman was an internationally recognised jurist on international arbitration and was also noted for his impact on constitutional jurisprudence in India. He was honoured with the 19th Lal Bahadur Shastri National Award for Excellence in Public Administration in 2018. He was one of India's most distinguished constitutional lawyers and argued several leading cases. He was the Additional Solicitor General of India from May 1972 to June 1975.

Nariman was awarded the Padma Bhushan (1991), Padma Vibhushan (2007) and Gruber Prize for Justice (2002) and was a nominated member of the Rajya Sabha, the Upper House of the Parliament of India for a term (1999–2005).

== Early life and education ==
Born in 1929 in Rangoon to Parsi parents Sam Bariyamji Nariman and Banoo Nariman, Fali did his schooling from the Bishop Cotton School, Shimla. He then graduated in Economics and History from the St. Xavier's College, Mumbai, followed by a law degree (LL.B.) from the Government Law College, Mumbai in 1950, after standing first in the Examination and being awarded the Kinlock Forbes Gold Medal and Prize for Roman Law & Jurisprudence. His father initially wanted him to take the Indian Civil Service examination. Since he could not afford it at that time, he chose law as his last option.

== Career ==
Nariman started his law practice at the Bombay High Court. After practising for 22 years, he was appointed a Senior Advocate in the Supreme Court of India in 1971. He said that "My senior's senior, Jamsetjee Kanga was my mentor. He was like a father figure to me. He died at 93 and he is the one who, at the age of 92, told me that he was still learning. He had a tremendous memory and so does my son Rohinton. He was an Ordained Priest and so is Rohinton."

Nariman was instrumental to the development of the Indian Constitution's Law. Nariman was Additional Solicitor General of India from May 1972 to 25 June 1975, resigning from that post upon the Declaration of Emergency on 26 June 1975.

Nariman argued in favour of Union carbide in the infamous Bhopal gas disaster case, which he later admitted was a mistake. He was instrumental in getting a deal between victims and the company outside court, which offered an amount of $470 million to the victims. He also argued in the famous case of the Supreme Court AoR Association, in which the Supreme Court took over the appointment of judges in the Higher Judiciary. He also appeared in many important cases like Golak Nath, S.P. Gupta, T.M.A. Pai Foundation, etc.

Nariman was the recipient of the Padma Vibhushan (in 2007) and Padma Bhushan (in 1991), respectively the second and third highest honours granted to civilians by the President of India. Both awards were for Nariman's contributions to jurisprudence and public affairs. Nariman was awarded the Gruber Prize for Justice in 2002. He dedicated his awards to his alma mater Bishop Cotton School in Shimla.

Nariman was a President-appointee member of the Rajya Sabha (the upper house of the Parliament of India) between 1999 and 2005. He served as President of International Council for Commercial Arbitration from 1994 onwards, President of the Bar Association of India from 1991, Vice-chairman of the Internal Court of Arbitration of the International Chamber of Commerce from 1989, honorary member of the International Commission of Jurists from 1988, and member of the London Court of International Arbitration from 1988. He was appointed to the advisory board of the United Nations Conference on Trade and Development in November 1999, and served as chairman of the executive committee of the International Commission of Jurists from 1995 to 1997.

Nariman represented the Gujarat government in the matter of the Narmada rehabilitation but resigned shortly after attacks on Christians in the area and the burning of copies of the Bible.

In December 2009 the Committee on Judicial Accountability stated that it considered that recommendations for judicial appointments should only be made after a public debate, including review by members of the bar of the affected high courts. This statement was made in relation to controversy about the appointments of justices C. K. Prasad and P. D. Dinakaran. The statement was signed by Ram Jethmalani, Shanti Bhushan, Fali Sam Nariman, Anil B. Divan, Kamini Jaiswal and Prashant Bhushan.

On 17 October 2014, he appeared for the former Chief Minister of Tamil Nadu J. Jayalalitha in a conviction and obtained bail for her, which had earlier been rejected.

Nariman was Hindustan Coca-Cola Beverages' legal counsel in the Plachimada dispute.

== Personal life and death ==
Nariman was married to Bapsi F. Nariman, since 1955, and the couple had two children, a son and a daughter and lived in New Delhi. His son Rohinton Nariman was a Judge of the Supreme Court of India, who had also held the post of the Solicitor General of India from 2011 to 2013.

The Vis Moot East's Fali Nariman Award for 'Best Respondent's Memorandum' is named after Nariman.

Fali Sam Nariman died on 21 February 2024, at the age of 95.

== Autobiography ==
Nariman's autobiography is called "Before Memory Fades: An Autobiography".
