= P. D. Dinakaran =

Indian judge

Chief Justice of the Sikkim High Court
- In office 8 August 2008 – 29 July 2011
- Preceded by: Barin Ghosh
- Succeeded by: Permod Kohli

Personal details
- Born: 9 May 1950 (age 76) Arakkonam, Tamil Nadu

Paul Daniel Dinakaran Premkumar (born 9 May 1950) served as the Chief Justice of the Sikkim High Court. He resigned from the post following allegations of corruption and subsequent removal proceedings.

== Childhood and education ==
P.D Dinakaran was born in a Dalit family at Arakkonam, North Arcot (now Vellore District). He did his schooling and then attended the Madras Christian College, Chennai and studied chemistry. He obtained his Masters in Political Science and Public Administration and Bachelor of Law Degree from Madras Law College.

== Career ==
He started his career in Madras High Court. He also practised in the State and Central Administrative Tribunals at Madras. He served as a legal adviser and standing counsel for Pondicherry University and for several state-owned corporations, such as Tamil Nadu State Marketing Corporation (TASMAC), Tamil Nadu Sugar Corporation, Tamil Nadu Sugar Federation Limited, Tamil Nadu Co-operative Milk Producers Federation (Aavin).

He was also standing counsel for various religious institutions, such as Churches of South India, Madras Diocese and Coimbatore Diocese and Sri Subramania Swami Temple, Tiruttani and for several Local Bodies, educational institutions, teachers' federations, agriculturists associations, marketing societies and social organisations.

On 28 August 2009, the Supreme Court of India announced that Dinakaran would be elevated to a Supreme Court Judge, but this was halted due to allegations of corruption and surrounding controversy. Dinakaran subsequently refused to go on leave when asked by Chief Justice of India K.G. Balakrishnan and was transferred to the Sikkim High Court. On 29 July 2011 he resigned from the post of Sikkim High Court Chief Justice. He was facing impeachment proceedings from parliament on alleged charges of corruption and judicial misconduct.

== Controversies ==
In September 2009, allegations were made against Dinakaran by several members of the Bar Council of India including former Union Law Minister Ram Jethmalani, stating that he had huge assets and land acquisitions in his hometown Arakkonam more than what was fixed by the Tamil Nadu Land reforms. The lawyers requested Chief Justice of India and Union Law Minister not to appoint Dinakaran as Supreme Court Judge and initiate an inquiry into the allegation. The members wrote a letter to President Pratibha Patil, Prime Minister Manmohan Singh and Union Law Minister to intervene in this matter.

Justice Dinakaran had not been performing any judicial functions since December 2009 when the Chairman of the Rajya Sabha admitted a motion seeking his removal on charges of corruption and abuse of his judicial office. The Supreme Court collegium headed by Chief Justice K.G. Balakrishnan had decided to replace Justice Dinakaran with Uttarakhand High Court Chief Justice JS Khehar, and recommended transfer of Dinakaran to the Sikkim High Court. Later, Prime Minister Manmohan Singh questioned about the desirability of shifting Chief Justices. The Law Ministry returned the file to the collegium for consideration afresh. As a result, the collegium, headed by the then incumbent Chief Justice of India, S.H. Kapadia, met and reconsidered the whole issue and stuck to the earlier decision to shift the Chief Justices. The Sikkim Bar Association opposed the transfer of Dinakaran to the Sikkim High Court and asked the Supreme Court to reconsider the proposal, (which requires approval from Indian President Pratibha Patil). The Sikkim Bar Association president D R Thapa had asked "How come the person be fit to be discharge judicial duties in one state if he has not been found worthy of doing the same in another state?"

== Impeachment proceedings and resignation ==
Facing impeachment on charges of corruption and judicial misconduct, he resigned from the post of Sikkim high court Chief Justice on 29 July 2011 expressing "lack of faith and confidence" in the three-member inquiry Committee probing charges against him.

"Before demitting office, I must confess with a very heavy heart that in spite of my constitutional position, I have been denied fair opportunity to defend myself and my reputation by the Judges Inquiry Committee," he said in a two-page letter of resignation sent to President Pratibha Patil.

Justice Dinakaran, a Dalit, also said he had a "sneaking suspicion" that his "misfortune" was because of the circumstances of his birth in the socially oppressed and underprivileged section of the society.

This opinion of his at the time of resignation is surprising to say the least because of following facts:

1. At first, Supreme Court of India had decided to elevate him as a Judge of the Supreme Court of India.
2. Then cases of misconduct and corruption were alleged against him by Chennai-based Forum for Judicial Accountability, in September 2009. These allegations were confirmed by the Tiruvallur Collector in two reports. Only after this, the Supreme Court of India collegium dropped Justice Dinakaran's name for elevation.
3. Thereafter on a complaint from 76 members of Parliament, the Rajya Sabha chairman admitted a motion for the removal of Justice Dinakaran.
4. After that, Rajya Sabha chairman Hamid Ansari had in January 2010 constituted the three-member panel comprising Supreme Court Justice Aftab Alam (judge), Karnataka High Court Chief Justice J S Khehar and senior advocate P P Rao to examine the 12 charges framed in the notice of motion adopted by the House.
5. Supreme Court of India bench headed by a very senior judge, Justice GS Singhvi permitted Dinakaran's plea seeking Rao's removal just on the ground that Rao was biased against him. However, the same bench refused to quash the charges framed by three-member panel saying "They are legally trained minds who can detect the fabricated material. In fact, it (three-member panel) would offer protection to a judge also from baseless allegations,"

Mysteriously, on 4 August 2011, Justice Dinakaran had a "change of heart" and wrote to the law ministry seeking to withdraw his resignation. But the ministry rejected his request. However, his pre-emptive resignation did manage to scuttle the probe against him as the chairman of Rajya Sabha, Hamid Ansari, quietly buried the inquiry committee citing Dinakaran's resignation in July.

== Post retirement benefits ==
On 15 January 2012, it became public through an RTI query that Justice Dinakaran along with his other colleague facing similar accusations Justice Soumitra Sen will keep getting their post-retirement benefits, even though they resigned ahead of impeachment proceedings against them, as there are no Constitutional or statutory provisions restricting their entitlements in such a scenario.

== See also ==
- Soumitra Sen – former judge of the Calcutta High Court, who became the first judge to be impeached by the Rajya Sabha.
- V. Ramaswami – former judge of the Supreme Court, who became the first judge against whom Parliament initiated impeachment proceedings.
- C. S. Karnan – former judge of the Calcutta High Court, who became the first judge of a high court to be punished for contempt of court while in office.
- Judicial corruption in India
