= Kamini Jaiswal =

Indian lawyer

- Occupation: Lawyer

Kamini Jaiswal is an Indian lawyer practicing at Supreme Court of India. She along with Prashant Bhushan appeared for PIL filed by NGO Centre for Public Interest Litigation (CPIL) in Supreme Court on 2G case.

Jaiswal is member of Committee on Judicial Accountability which is a group of eminent lawyers of India who work to improve the accountability of judges.
