= Yashwant Varma =

Jurist and former Judge of the High Court of Allahabad

The Honourable Justice Yashwant Varma
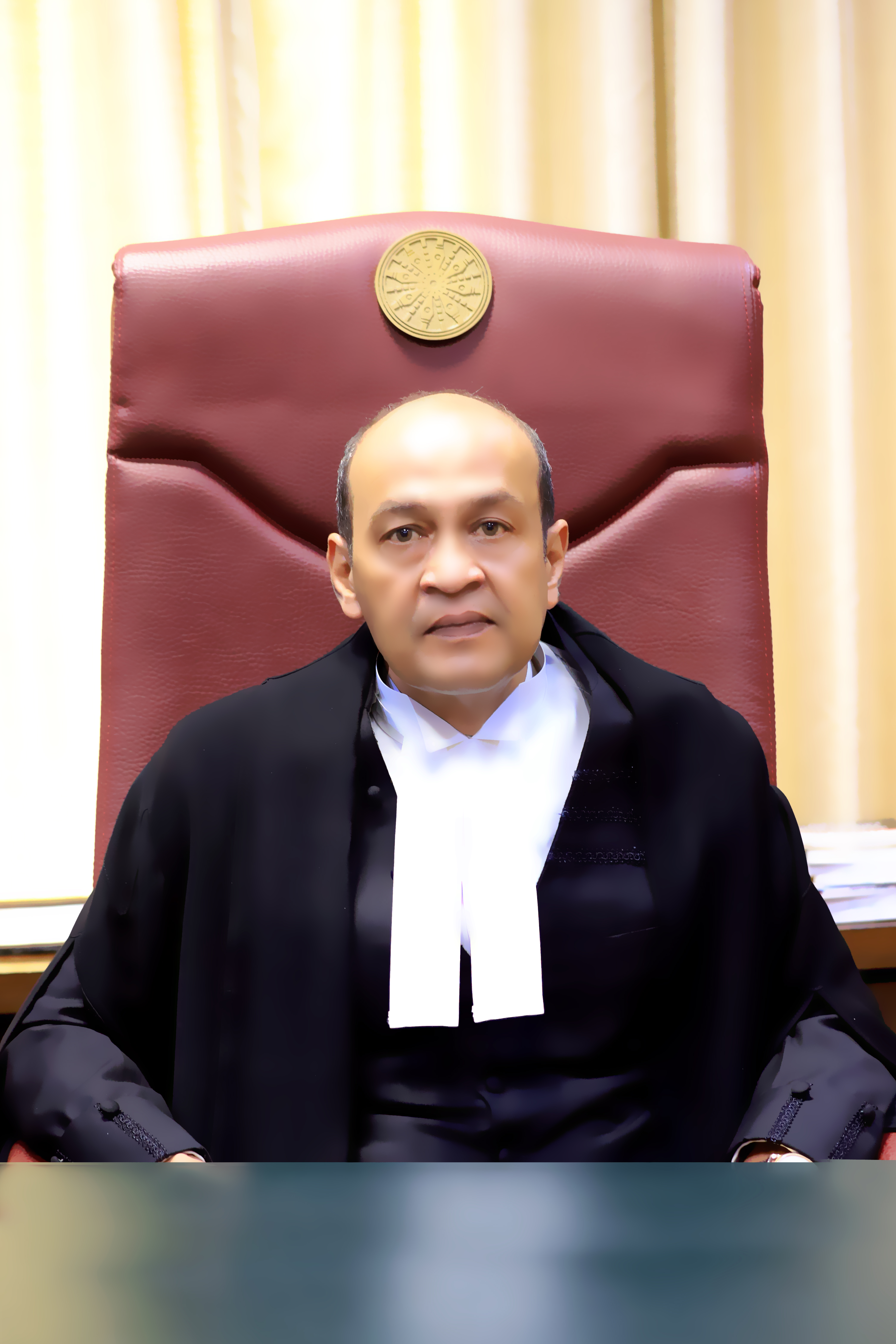
- Official portrait

Judge of Allahabad High Court
- Incumbent
- Assumed office 5 April 2025 - 10 April 2026 (resigned)
- Nominated by: Sanjiv Khanna
- Appointed by: Droupadi Murmu
- In office 13 October 2014 – 10 October 2021
- Nominated by: Rajendra Mal Lodha
- Appointed by: Pranab Mukherjee

Judge of Delhi High Court
- In office 11 October 2021 – 4 April 2025
- Nominated by: N. V. Ramana
- Appointed by: Ram Nath Kovind

Personal details
- Born: January 6, 1969 (age 57)
- Education: B.Com (Hons.); L.L.B.
- Alma mater: Hansraj College, Delhi University; Rewa University, Madhya Pradesh

Yashwant Varma (born 6 January 1969) is an Indian jurist who served as a Judge of the Allahabad High Court till his resignation on 10 April 2026. He previously served as a judge of the Delhi High Court from October 2021 to April 2025.

== Early life ==
He was born in Prayagraj and pursued a Bachelor of Commerce (Honours) degree at Hansraj College, Delhi University. He later obtained a Bachelor of Laws (LLB) degree from Awadhesh Pratap Singh University, Madhya Pradesh.

== Career ==
Varma enrolled as an advocate on 8 August 1992 and served as special counsel for the Allahabad High Court from 2006 until his elevation to the bench. In October 2014, he was appointed as an additional judge of the Allahabad High Court and was sworn in as a permanent judge in February 2016. He was transferred to the Delhi High Court in October 2021, and repatriated to Allahabad High Court in April 2025.

== Controversy ==
In 2025, a large sum of currency notes was discovered at his residence during a fire on March 14. An in-house inquiry was conducted by a panel constituted by the Supreme Court in the matter that decided to keep it redacted from public and parliamentary scrutiny citing its sensitivity. The panel found that the accusations against Varma were true and serious enough to possibly start impeachment proceedings On May 8, former Chief Justice of India Sanjiv Khanna wrote to the President of India and the Prime Minister forwarding the inquiry report. On 21 July 2025 over 200 MPs of both Lok Sabha and Rajya Sabha signed a motion in parliament to impeach Varma. On August 12, 2025, Lok Sabha Speaker Om Birla announced a three-member inquiry committee to investigate the charges against him.

On 9 April 2026, Varma tendered his resignation to the President pending confirmation.

https://www.newslaundry.com/2026/04/27/lalit-hotel-ducked-crores-in-dues-justice-varma-granted-it-relief-but-hc-tore-up-his-order
