= C. S. Karnan =

Indian judge (1955–2026)

Judge, Calcutta High Court
- In office 11 March 2016 – 12 June 2017

Judge, Madras High Court
- In office 30 March 2009 – 11 March 2016

Personal details
- Born: Karunanithi Swaminathan; 12 June 1955 Karnatham, Vriddachalam taluk, Cuddalore district, Madras State, India
- Died: 13 November 2026 (aged 71) Chennai, Tamil Nadu, India
- Spouse: Saraswati
- Children: 2

Chinnaswamy Swaminathan Karnan (12 June 1955 – 13 November 2026) was an Indian judge. In May 2017, he was sentenced to six months of imprisonment by the Supreme Court of India, holding him guilty of contempt of court. He was the first Indian High Court judge to be punished for contempt while in office but was arrested and jailed after retirement.

== Early life and education ==
Karnan was born on 12 June 1955 as Karunanithi Swaminathan in the village of Karnatham, in the Cuddalore district of erstwhile Madras (now Tamil Nadu), into a Dalit family. He was the second of eight children born to Chinnaswamy Swaminathan, a school teacher and headmaster, and a recipient of President's Best Teacher Award, and Kamalam, a homemaker. He completed schooling in Karnatham's Adi Dravidar school and a government school in Mangalampet, before completing his pre-university course from Government Arts College, Vridhachalam. Thereafter, he graduated with a Bachelor of Science degree in botany from The New College, Chennai, and subsequently obtained a Bachelor of Laws degree from Madras Law College in 1983. He changed his first name from Karunanithi to Karnan in 1991, on the insistence of his wife Saraswati due to numerological reasons.

== Career ==
Upon graduating with a law degree in 1983, Karnan enrolled as advocate before the Bar Council of Tamil Nadu and began to practice civil law. During the time, he was selected as legal adviser to the Chennai Metro Water Supply and Sewage Board, the government advocate in civil suits, and also as a standing counsel for the union government.

In 2009, Justice Asok Kumar Ganguly, then the Chief Justice of the Madras High Court, recommended Karnan's name to the collegium for appointment as a judge. Despite his work not being well known to the collegium, his appointment was approved by the collegium headed by then Chief Justice of India K. G. Balakrishnan. Speaking about it to The Hindu, Ganguly justified the appointment because "he [Karnan] represented a certain community that should be represented in the choice of judges", but Ganguly, along with other members of the collegium, expressed regret over it later.

=== Controversies ===
In November 2011, Karnan wrote to the National Commission for Scheduled Castes (NCSC) alleging caste-based harassment from other judges of the Madras High Court. Addressing a press conference organized in his chamber, he said that he had faced such "humiliation and embarrassment since April 2009" and that it still continued. He spoke of a specific incident when a judge "touched him with his foot". This led to an agitation in the campus of the Court. The then NCSC Chairman, P. L. Punia, had forwarded Karnan's letter to the then Chief Justice of India, Justice S. H. Kapadia.

During the time, the then Chief Justice of the Madras High Court, Rajesh Kumar Agrawal, wrote to the Chief Justice of the Supreme Court, P. Sathasivam, asking him to transfer Justice Karnan to any other High Court. However, Karnan wrote to Sathasivam and Agrawal, stating that he wished to stay on at the Madras High Court, in order to prove the allegations that he had raised against the Chief Justice and the other judges of the Court. Subsequently, Karnan wrote to the joint registrar of the Right to Information section, alleging irregularities in the appointment of district judges. He sought details of the selection process in order to file a complaint before President Pranab Mukherjee. In the intervening period, 20 judges of the Madras High Court jointly wrote to the Chief Justice of India requesting Justice Karnan's transfer.

In 2015, Justice Karnan stood up for an intern whom another judge had allegedly sexually harassed in his chamber.

In late 2015, he wrote a letter to the Chief Justice Sanjay Kishan Kaul saying he was going on a long leave because of the 'dummy cases' he was being allotted. In February 2016, the apex court transferred him to Calcutta High Court.

On 23 January 2017, Justice Karnan published an open letter to the Prime Minister Narendra Modi, naming "an initial list" of 20 sitting and retired Supreme Court and High Court judges allegedly involved in corruption.

On 8 May 2017, Justice Karnan sentenced Chief Justice of India Jagdish Singh Khehar and seven other Supreme Court judges to five-year rigorous imprisonment after holding them guilty under the Scheduled Caste and Scheduled Tribe (Prevention of Atrocities) Act, 1989 and the amended Act of 2015.

This led to the Supreme Court sentencing him to six months imprisonment for contempt of court on 9 May 2017. He finally retired on 12 June and after a week of his retirement, was arrested by the Kolkata Police on 21 June 2017 from Coimbatore. He was eventually released from prison on 20 December 2017 after completing his six-month sentence.

== Death ==
C.S. Karnan died on 13 November 2026, at the age of 71.

== See also ==
- Soumitra Sen, former judge of the Calcutta High Court, who became the first judge to be impeached by the Rajya Sabha.
- P. D. Dinakaran – former Chief Justice of the Sikkim High Court, against whom Parliament initiated impeachment proceedings.
- V. Ramaswami – former judge of the Supreme Court, who became the first judge in whose impeachment proceedings Parliament voted, unsuccessfully.
