= Supreme Court Bar Association (India) =

Bar Association

- Type: Bar association
- Headquarters: New Delhi, India
- Region served: India
- Official language: English
- President: Pradeep Rai
- Vice President: Rahul Kaushik
- Hony. Secretary: Pragya Baghel
- Website: scbaindia.org

The Supreme Court Bar Association (SCBA) is an Indian bar association, comprising the practising lawyers of the Supreme Court of India. Pradeep Rai is the President of the association (2026-27), Rahul Kaushik is the Vice-President and Pragya Baghel is the Honorary Secretary.

== Notable Former Presidents ==
- Ashoke Kumar Sen
- Ram Jethmalani
- Pavani Parameswara Rao
- M. N. Krishnamani
- Kapil Sibal
- Pravin H. Parekh

== See also ==
- Bar Council of India
