= Chandramauli Kumar Prasad =

Indian judge (born 1949)

Chairman of the Press Council of India
- In office 25 November 2014 – 21 November 2021
- Preceded by: Markandey Katju
- Succeeded by: Ranjana Prakash Desai

Judge of the Supreme Court of India
- In office 2010–2014

Personal details
- Born: 15 July 1949 (age 76) Patna, Bihar, India
- Spouse: Madhu Prasad
- Children: 3
- Education: Graduated in law from Patna University
- Occupation: (Retd.) Judge, Supreme Court of India

Chandramauli Kumar Prasad (born 15 July 1949) is the Chairman of the Press Council of India and a retired judge of the Supreme Court of India. He served as a Supreme Court judge from 8 February 2010 to 14 July 2014.

== Early life and education ==
Prasad undertook school education at Patna High School, from where he passed the Secondary School Examination. After graduating in science from Magadh University, Prasad chose to study the stream of law and graduated in law from Patna University in 1973. Prasad is married to Mrs. Madhu Rukhaiyar and has three children, two sons and a daughter.

== Career ==
Prasad began his career by enrolling as an Advocate on 27 November 1973 with the Bar Council of Bihar. He practiced in civil, constitutional, criminal, and service matters at the High Court of Judicature at Patna, Bihar, and was designated as a senior advocate on 17 July 1989. He was appointed the additional advocate general of the State of Bihar on 14 December 1993. He was elevated as a permanent judge of the Patna High Court on 8 November 1994 and was transferred to the Madhya Pradesh High Court on 21 November 1994 from where he was transferred back to Patna High Court on 10 September 2001. He was appointed the acting Chief Justice of Patna High Court from 3 March 2008 to 12 May 2008 and from 17 December 2008 to 15 March 2009.

He took oath as the Chief Justice of Allahabad High Court on 20 March 2009 and was elevated as a judge of the Supreme Court of India on 7 February 2010 from where he superannuated on 14 July 2014.<https://www.allahabadhighcourt.in/service/judgeDetail.jsp?id=136>

Thereafter he was appointed Chairman of the Press Council of India on 25 November 2014, succeeding Markandey Katju <https://www.newindianexpress.com/nation/2014/nov/25/2014-686678.html>. Prasad has held various offices including the office of the vice-president of the English Speaking Union of Commonwealth and the President of the Patna Golf Club. He is an avid golfer and is seen more than often on public holidays at the Delhi Golf Course and sometimes at many (golf)courses in and around New Delhi. Work and family are his priorities and golf immediately comes after that. He plays to the handicap of 14. He is also a visiting professor at G.D. Goenka College.

He served as the Chairman of the Bihar State Judicial Academy and a Member of the advisory board to consider the cases of detention under preventive law of the States of Madhya Pradesh and Bihar. He is an experienced arbitrator who has done a large number of arbitrations, including international arbitration under BIT, involving individual companies, public sector companies, foreign countries and companies, and Govt. of India.

== Publications ==
Prasad is the revising author of the 22nd edition of the legal classic Ratanlal and Dhirajlal – Code of Criminal Procedure along with Advocate Namit Saxena.

He is also the revising author of the 19th edition of Mulla – Code of Civil Procedure along with Justice Deepak Verma and Advocate Namit Saxena. Reputed publisher Lexis Nexis India has published both books.

== Notable judgments and opinions ==
As a champion of civil liberty, in Arnesh Kumar v. State of Bihar [(2014) 8 SCC 273], Prasad gave a landmark ruling and very strongly pointed out the blatant misuse of the Sec.498A of IPC in India. Prasad held that no arrest should be made only because the offense is non-bailable and cognizable. Neither should arrest be made in a routine, casual, and cavalier manner or on a mere allegation of commission of an offense made against a person. Arrest should only be made after a reasonable satisfaction is reached after due investigation as to the genuineness of the allegation. The Honorable Court discussed Sec. 41(1) of Cr.P.C. in great detail and emphasized that for making an arrest the police must be satisfied that all the conditions set out in the provision are met. The Honorable Court also condemned the mechanical manner in which the police give reasons for remand, reproduce the reasons in every case, and the casual manner in which the magistrates grant it.

In Vishwa Lochan Madan v. Union of India [(2014) 7 SCC 707], a bench led by Prasad held that fatwas and Shariat court decisions were not legally enforceable.

In the case concerning attacks in the city of Mumbai on 26 November 2011; Mohd. Ajmal Amir Kasab v. State of Maharashtra [(2012) 9 SCC 1], Prasad affirmed that the conspiracy for the terrorist activity was hatched certainly in Pakistan while carving out an exception for the settled principle of ‘certain probability’ in criminal jurisprudence.

In Nandlal Wasudeo Badwaik v. Lata Nandlal Badwaik and Anr. (2014) 2 SCC 576), Prasad authored that when there is a conflict between a conclusive proof envisaged under law and a proof based on scientific advancement accepted by the world community to be correct, the latter must prevail over the former.
