= Tsai Chang-hai =

Taiwanese physician

- 蔡長海

7th Chairman of China Medical University
- Incumbent
- Assumed office 2001
- Preceded by: Chen Lifu

Personal details
- Born: September 15, 1949 (age 77) Budai, Tainan, Taiwan
- Occupation: Doctor; educator; entrepreneur

Tsai Chang-hai (Chinese: 蔡長海, born 15 September 1949), Taiwanese doctor, educator, and an entrepreneur. Born in Chayi, Tsai is the chairman of China Medical University and former superintendent of its Taichung Hospital. He is also the founder of Asia University and serveral biomedicine companies. During his term, China Medical University Hospital transformed from a local hospital to a medical centre. Both China Medical University and Asia University have since ranked among the top 500 universities worldwide, and his two biotechnology companies have gone public.

== Biography ==
=== Early life ===
Tsai was born on 15 September 1949, in Budai Township, Tung-shih District, Tainan County (now Budai Township, Chiayi County), Taiwan. Inspired to become a doctor from childhood, he attended National Tainan First Senior High School, and admitted to the medicine major at China Medical College. He graduated from the college in 1976.

Tsai later trained at Chang Gung Hospital in 1982, specialising in paediatrics. At the time, rumours circulated that the newly established China Medical College Hospital (CMCH) was about to close. Chen Lifu, then chairman of the school, convinced Tsai to serve his alma mater's hospital before considering a position at Chang Gung. He later studied at Northwestern University in Chicago, United States. After finishing his studies, Tsai chose to return to Taiwan rather than work in the United States.

During the time, CMCH faced poor operational performance and could offer only low wages to employees. As a result, doctors were permitted to operate private businesses outside the hospital. Tsai established his paediatrics clinic, which he ran until becoming superintendent, when the superintendent life was too busy to continue his clinic. Tsai later served as CMCH's vice superintendent. He was once considered opening a paediatrics hospital, but later abandoned the idea after Chen, who had trained him for years, convinced him.

=== Superintendent of hospital ===
In 1995, Tsai became superintendent of CMCH. He earned his Doctor of Medicine from Teikyo University in 1996. At the time, Taiwan's National Health Insurance system was introduced. Seizing it as an opportunity for the hospital, Tsai announced that CMUH would promoted to a medical centre in five years. When he took superintendent, CMUH was regarded as a local hospital in Taichung.

To expedite the goal, Tsai recruited top talented doctors from across Taiwan: Following the example of Chang Gung hospitals under Wang Yung-ching's role, he offered promising rewards to attract excellent doctors. One of his most notable recruits was Dray Song Hong, personal doctor to Lee Teng-hui, who joined as vice superintendent. Many of the doctors Tsai recruited came from Chang Gung Hospital, earning CMCH the nickname "little Chang Gung" (小長庚) in local industry.

Hong's appointment was later considered the hospital's turning point. CMCH was promoted to would-be medical centre (準醫學中心), and promoted to medical centre in 2000, achieving Tsai's goal ahead of schedule. In 2008, CMUH had 2,800 beds, second only to the National Taiwan University Hospital. In 2012, CMUH's payments accounted for approximately 4% of total medical payments in Taiwan.

=== School management ===
After Chen Lifu's death in 2001, Tsai became chairman of China Medical College. During his tenure, China Medical College was renamed China Medical University (CMU). Tsai also recruited prominent academics, including Huang Jong-tsun, Wen-Hwa Lee, and Mien-Chie Hung.

Tsai had long considered establishing another university during his term of CMU, amid government encouragement to establish universities. In this context, Tsai established Asia University (originally named "Taichung Healthcare and Management University", Chinese: 台中健康暨管理學院) with Tseng-Lien Lin (Chinese: 林增連) in Wufeng, Taichung, in 2001. Both CMU and Asia University have since earned global recognition, ranking among the top 500 universities worldwide.

=== Biomedicine industry ===
Tsai entered the biomedicine industry in 2016, when he established Ever Supreme (Chinese: 長聖生技), a regenerative medicine company. In 2018, he established Ever Fortune AI (Chinese: 長佳智能), a digital healthcare firm. Both companies went public. Alongside Shine-On Biomedical (Chinese: 聖安生醫), a drug company develops specialising in exosome and antibody, these enterprises have a combined market value of nearly 23 billion TWD.
