= Edward Chang =

Edward Chang may refer to:

- Edward Y. Chang, American computer scientist
- Edward Chang (electrical engineer)
- Edward Chang (neurosurgeon)
