= Biava =

Biava is an Italian surname. Notable people with the surname include:

- Fabrizio Biava (born 1983), Italian footballer
- Giuseppe Biava (born 1977), Italian footballer
- Vincenzo Biava (1916–2004), Italian sport shooter
- Pier Mario Biava, Italian cancer researcher
