= Shasanka Mohan Roy =

Indian quantum physicist (born 1941)

- Born: 2 September 1941 (age 84); Delhi, India
- Education: University of Delhi; Princeton University; University of California, San Diego
- Known for: Roy's equations; Roy-Singh bounds
- Awards: 1981 Shanti Swarup Bhatnagar Prize; 2003 ISCA S. N. Bose Birth Centenary Gold Medal
- Scientific career
- Fields: High energy physics; Quantum field theory
- Workplaces: Tata Institute of Fundamental Research; Jawaharlal Nehru University; European Organization for Nuclear Research; Saclay Nuclear Research Centre; University of Lausanne; Syracuse University; University of Alberta; University of Kaiserslautern; University of York

Shasanka Mohan Roy (born 2 September 1941) is an Indian quantum physicist and a Raja Ramanna fellow of the Department of Atomic Energy at the School of Physical Sciences of Jawaharlal Nehru University. He is also a former chair of the Theoretical Physics Group Committee at Tata Institute of Fundamental Research. Known for developing Exact Integral Equation on pion-pion dynamics, also called Roy's equations, and his work on Bell inequalities, Roy is an elected fellow of all the three major Indian science academies – Indian Academy of Sciences, Indian National Science Academy, and National Academy of Sciences, India – as well as The World Academy of Sciences. The Council of Scientific and Industrial Research, the apex agency of the Government of India for scientific research, awarded Roy the Shanti Swarup Bhatnagar Prize for Science and Technology, one of the highest Indian science awards, for his contributions to Physical Sciences in 1981. (Note: Long link – please select award year to see details)

== Biography ==
Roy, born on 2 September 1941 in the Indian capital of Delhi, did his early college studies at Delhi University from where he earned a BSc (hons) in 1960 and an MSc in 1962. Subsequently, he moved to the US on a union territories overseas scholarship for his doctoral studies at Princeton University and after securing a PhD in 1966, he did his post-doctoral work at the University of California, San Diego from 1966 to 1967. On his return to India, Roy joined Tata Institute of Fundamental Research in 1967 to commence an association which would last close to four decades and during this period, he chaired the Theoretical Physics Group Committee of the institution from 1992 to 1997. He was serving as a senior professor at the time of his superannuation in 2006. Post retirement from regular service, Roy joined Jawaharlal Nehru University as a Raja Ramanna fellow of the Department of Atomic Energy at the School of Physical Sciences. He also held visiting faculty positions at a number of institutions abroad which included four stints at European Organization for Nuclear Research (CERN) and one each at Saclay Nuclear Research Centre, University of Lausanne, Syracuse University, University of Alberta, University of Kaiserslautern and University of York.

Roy is married to Nandita and the couple has two children, Arunabha and Aditi. The family lives in Vashi, one of the nodes of Navi Mumbai in Maharashtra.

== Legacy ==
EPR paradox illustration

Roy's research was principally based on pion dynamics and hadron interactions. His work on axiomatic quantum field theory assisted him to develop an exact integral equation which later came to be known as Roy's equations, and many scientists opined that the equation helped in pion–pion data analysis. Roy furthered the studies of Andre Martin on high-energy bounds and the observations of John Stewart Bell regarding Einstein-Podolsky-Rosen paradox; his work on the former resulted in the development of Roy-Singh bounds (unitarity bounds on high-energy cross sections) and the studies on the latter evolved into Roy-Singh multiparticle Bell inequalities and Auberson-Mahoux-Roy-Singh Bell inequalities. He developed the theme further by proposing Roy's multipartite separability inequalities. Another area of his research was the Chandrasekhar limit and the critical mass of boson systems, and Roy collaborated with Andre Martin to propose a proof for the relativistic collapse of M_{cr} critical mass. Dhar-Grover-Roy super-Zeno algorithm, for use in suppressing the transitions of a quantum mechanical system, Roy-Braunstein's quantum metrology, a precision measurement protocol, and his elucidation of Pomeranchuk's theorem and its violations are some of his other major contributions. His studies have been documented by way of a number of articles (Note: Please see Selected bibliography section) and ResearchGate, an online repository of scientific articles, has listed 105 of them. Besides, he has published a book, Advances in High Energy Physics, along with Virendra Singh, and his work has drawn citations from other scientists.

Roy initiated the Theoretical Physics Seminar Circuit (TPSC) of the Department of Science and Technology (DST) at Tata Institute of Fundamental Research. He has conducted lecture courses for DST at CSIR-Structural Engineering Research Centre institutions and served as the expert member at the senate of the Indian Institute of Technology, Bombay in 1997. Roy was the principal Indian investigator of the Indo-French Centre for the Promotion of Advanced Research (IFCPAR/CEFIPRA)-funded project on Rigorous Results on Schroedinger Equations and Foundations of Quantum Theory and Applications to Particle physics and Astrophysics during 1999–2002.

== Awards and honors ==
The Council of Scientific and Industrial Research awarded Roy the Shanti Swarup Bhatnagar Prize, one of the highest Indian science awards in 1981' The Indian Academy of Sciences elected him as a fellow in 1982 and he became of fellow of the Indian National Science Academy in 1989. The other major Indian science academy, National Academy of Sciences, India made him their fellow in 1993 and The World Academy of Sciences elected Roy as a fellow in 2002. In 2003, Indian Science Congress Association selected him for the S. N. Bose Birth Centenary Gold Medal.

== Selected bibliography ==
=== Books ===
- S. M. Roy; Virendra Singh (1973). Advances in High Energy Physics. Tata Institute of Fundamental Research.

=== Articles ===
- S. M. Roy (1998). "Maximally Causal Quantum Mechanics". Pramana. 51 (5): 597–602. arXiv:quant-ph/9811047. Bibcode:1998Prama..51..597R. doi:10.1007/BF02827451. S2CID 16787218.
- S. M. Roy, Veerendra Singh (1999). "Maximally Realistic Causal Quantum Mechanics". Physics Letters A. 255 (4–6): 201–208. arXiv:quant-ph/9811041. Bibcode:1999PhLA..255..201R. doi:10.1016/S0375-9601(99)00186-3. S2CID 1626474.
- Deepak Dhar, Lov K. Grover, Shasanka M. Roy (2006). "Preserving Quantum States: A Super-Zeno Effect". Physical Review Letters. 96 (10) 100405. Bibcode:2006PhRvL..96j0405D. doi:10.1103/PhysRevLett.96.100405. PMID 16605715. S2CID 36086444.
- S. M. Roy, Samuel L. Braunstein (2008). "Exponentially Enhanced Quantum Metrology". Physical Review Letters. 100 (22) 220501. arXiv:quant-ph/0607152. Bibcode:2008PhRvL.100v0501R. doi:10.1103/PhysRevLett.100.220501. PMID 18643409. S2CID 7979719.
- S. M. Roy (2013). "Exact Quantum Correlations of Conjugate Variables From Joint Quadrature Measurements". Physics Letters A. 377 (34–36): 2011–2015. arXiv:1305.0410. Bibcode:2013PhLA..377.2011R. doi:10.1016/j.physleta.2013.07.003. S2CID 118390430.
- André Martin, S. M. Roy (2015). "Froissart bound on inelastic cross section without unknown constants". Physical Review D. 91 (7) 076006. arXiv:1503.01261. Bibcode:2015PhRvD..91g6006M. doi:10.1103/PhysRevD.91.076006. S2CID 56316392.

== See also ==
- Bell's theorem
- Subrahmanyan Chandrasekhar
- Satyendra Nath Bose
- Virendra Singh (physicist)
