= Pier Mario Biava =

Italian occupational doctor

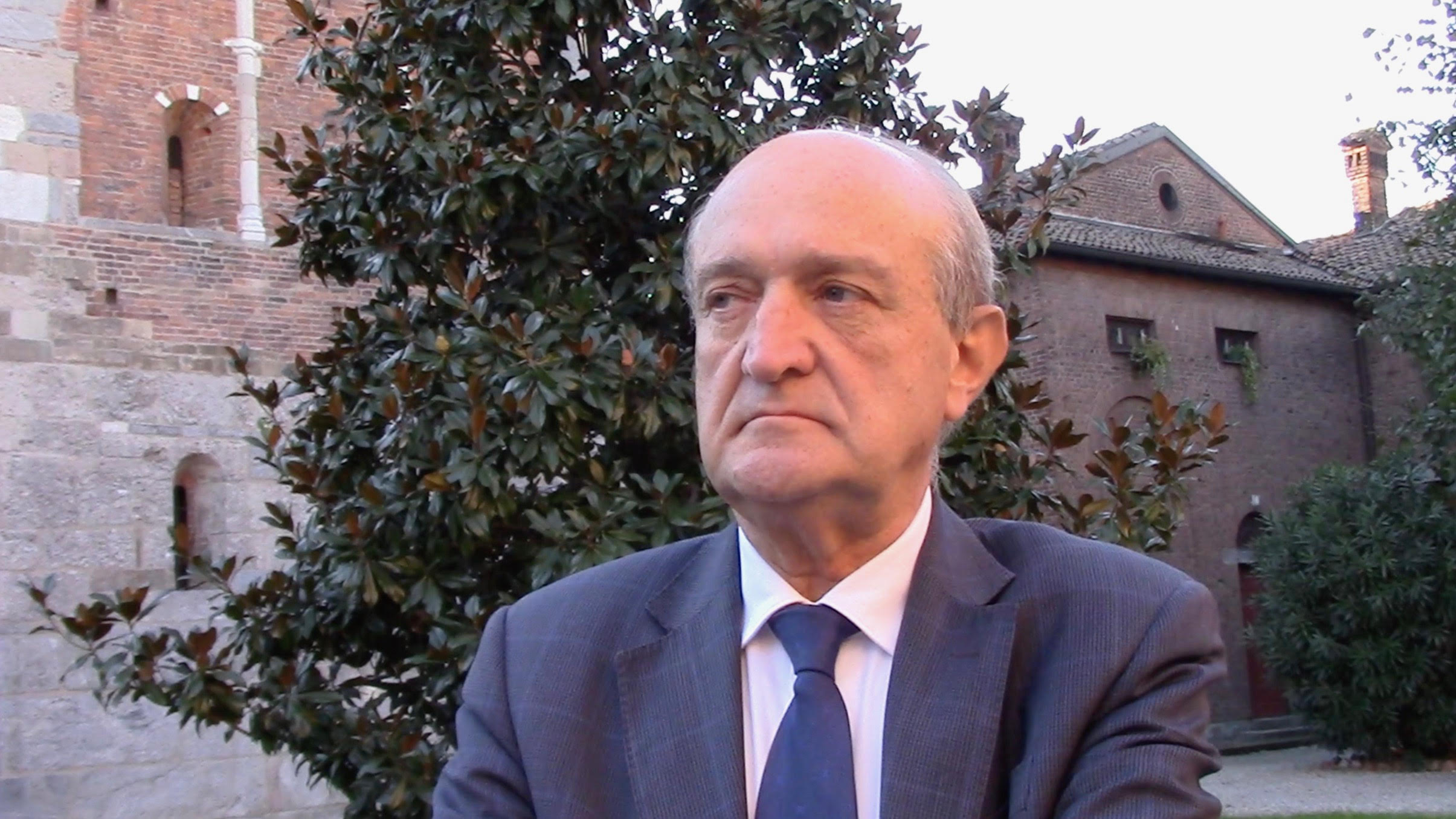
Pier Mario Biava

Pier Mario Biava is an Italian doctor and researcher whose work has focused on occupational medicine, environmental carcinogens, cell differentiation, and the relationship between stem cells and cancer. He is known for proposing and investigating the concept of physiological cellular reprogramming. In 2021, he co-founded the Equipe BiavaVITA365, which continues its work around the world.

== Education ==
Biava graduated in medicine from the University of Pavia in 1969. He specialized in occupational medicine at the University of Padua in 1972 and in hygiene at the University of Trieste in 1977. He worked at the University of Trieste's Institute of Occupational Medicine, where he taught industrial toxicology, industrial technology and the epidemiology of occupational diseases. He later headed the occupational medicine department at the hospital in Sesto San Giovanni, near Milan. From 1984 to 2003, he taught at the University of Trieste's postgraduate school of occupational medicine.

== Career and research ==
Biava's early research focused on occupational health and environmental carcinogens. His work included epidemiological studies of occupational and environmental exposure, including asbestos and air pollution. In 1992, he co-authored a study examining the health of Milan traffic police in relation to exposure to vehicular pollution.

From the 1980s, Biava investigated the relationship between embryonic development, cell differentiation and cancer. A 1988 paper in Cancer Letters examined the effects of embryonic and uterine tissue homogenates on Lewis lung carcinoma in mice.

In a 2011 review in Current Pharmaceutical Biotechnology, Biava and colleagues discussed the proposed use of stem-cell differentiation-stage factors to reprogram cancer cells. Their research examined possible effects on cell-cycle regulation and differentiation, as well as the potential application of these mechanisms to cancer treatment. Related studies investigated molecular pathways associated with cell proliferation and apoptosis, including the proteins p53 and retinoblastoma protein, and the effects of combining differentiation factors with conventional chemotherapy in laboratory models. Experimental work covered cancer cell lines derived from several tumor types, including colorectal, kidney and breast cancers, melanoma and glioblastoma.

Biava also contributed to research on exosomes and cellular communication. In 2021, he co-authored a study in the Journal of Translational Medicine examining exosome derivatives as a proposed approach to cancer-cell reprogramming, and a review in Cancers on exosomes in tumor progression and potential cancer treatment.

== Selected publications ==
- Biava, Pier Mario (2009). Cancer and the search for lost meaning : the discovery of a revolutionary new cancer treatment. Berkeley, Calif.: North Atlantic Books. ISBN 978-1-55643-778-6. OCLC 232980406.
- Laszlo, Ervin; Biava, Pier Mario (2019). Information medicine: the revolutionary cell-reprogramming discovery that reverses cancer and degenerative diseases. Rochester, Vermont: Inner Traditions/Bear. ISBN 978-1-62055-822-5. OCLC 1045155599.
