= Giriraj Kishore (writer) =

Indian writer (1937–2020)

- Born: 8 July 1937; Muzzafarnagar, Uttar Pradesh, India
- Died: 9 February 2020 (aged 82)
- Occupations: Writer, essayist
- Writing career
- Period: 1960’s–2020
- Notable works: The Girmitiya Saga, parishisht, Baa
- Notable awards: Sahitya Akademi Award, Vyas Samman, Padma Shri

Giriraj Kishore (8 July 1937 – 9 February 2020) was an Indian writer, who was awarded the Padma Shri by the president of India in 2007. He lived in Kanpur and served as the registrar of IIT Kanpur. He was given the Sahitya Akademi Award in 1992, the Vyas Samman in 2000, and an honorary Ph.D. by Chhatrapati Shahu Ji Maharaj University in 2002. A road has been named after him in the Civil Lines area of Kanpur known as Padmashri Giriraj Kishore Marg.

== Biography ==
Giriraj Kishore was born in Muzzafarnagar in 1937. His father was a zamindar, but because of his socialist principles and lack of interest in zamindari system Giriraj left home at a young age and became a Gandhian. He completed his master's degree in social work from The Institute of Social Sciences, Agra. He completed an emeritus fellowship by the University Grants Commission, Government of India in 1998–1999. He also did a fellowship at Indian Institute of Advanced Study, Simla from 1999 to 2001.

He had worked at different posts as an officer in the government, including as registrar of Kanpur University (Chhatrapati Shahu Ji Maharaj University) and the Indian Institute of Technology Kanpur in a career spanning more than 30 years. He was formerly a member of the Sahitya Akademi working committee, and the Railway Board of GOI.

He was married to Mrs. Meera Kishore and has 2 daughters and a son. Both his daughters are married. After his retirement from IIT KANPUR he resided in Kanpur . He also wrote articles regularly in newspapers and was the editor of a Hindi magazine Aakar.

== Awards ==
- Sahitya Akademi – 1992
- Vyas Samman – 2000
- Padma Shri – 2007

== Selected works ==
- Pahla Girmitiya (The Girmitiya Saga), for which he received the Padma Shri in 2007.
- Baa (Kasturba Gandhi- a bio fiction)
- Dhai Ghar
- Parishishta
- Aanjaney jayate etc.
