= 智威 =

智威, meaning "intellect, excellent", is an Asian given name.

It may refer to:

- Edward Y. Chang (張智威), Taiwanese computer scientist, academic, and author
- Tomotake, Japanese masculine given name for Tomotake Hasumi (蓮見智威) who produced 2022 film Love Life.
