= Ashok Jain =

Ashok Jain may refer to:

- Ashok Kumar Jain, chairman of Bennett, Coleman & Co., parent company of The Times of India
- Ashok Jain (biotechnologist), American biotechnologist
