= Hirdaya Behari Mathur =

Indian physical chemist

- Born: 27 May 1928; India
- Died: 12 January 1980 (aged 51)
- Education: Dr. Bhimrao Ambedkar University; University of Delhi; University of California, Berkeley
- Known for: Studies on radioactive isotopes and solid state diffusion of metals
- Awards: 1973 Shanti Swarup Bhatnagar Prize
- Scientific career
- Fields: Thermodynamics
- Workplaces: National Chemical Laboratory; Defence Materials and Stores Research and Development Establishment

Hirdaya Behari Mathur (27 May 1928 – 12 January 1980) was an Indian physical chemist and the director of Defence Materials and Stores Research and Development Establishment, Kanpur. He was known for his studies on radioactive isotopes and solid state diffusion of metals. Mathur was a fellow of Sigma Xi and an elected fellow of the Indian National Science Academy and the Indian Academy of Sciences. The Council of Scientific and Industrial Research, the apex agency of the Government of India for scientific research, awarded him the Shanti Swarup Bhatnagar Prize for Science and Technology, one of the highest Indian science awards, in 1973, for his contributions to chemical sciences.

== Biography ==
H. B. Mathur, born on 17 May 1928, graduated in chemistry from Dr. Bhimrao Ambedkar University (formerly known as Agra University) in 1946 and passed his master's degree from University of Delhi in 1948. Moving to the US, he secured a PhD in physical chemistry from University of California, Berkeley in 1954. Joining the National Chemical Laboratory in 1958, Mathur served the institution until 1976, reaching the position of the Scientist-in-charge of the physical chemistry division of the laboratory. In 1976, he joined Defence Materials and Stores Research and Development Establishment, the Kanpur station of the Defence Research and Development Organization where he stayed until 1980. Mathur's researches were primarily in the fields of thermodynamics and he worked on the chemical application of Mossbauer spectroscopy and the beta and gamma spectroscopic studies isotopes in the closed shell region. He also did researches on intermetallic diffusion and kinetics of high-temperature oxidation of metals and alloys and thermodynamics of the formation of complex ions in aqueous solutions.

Besides several articles published in peer-reviewed journals, (Note: Please see Selected bibliography section) Mathur authored a book, Radiochemical and Spectrometer Studies of Some New Nuclear Isomers Prepared by Cyclotron Bombardment and contributed a chapter to a book, Spectroscopy in Inorganic Chemistry - Vol I which was edited by C. N. R. Rao. His articles have been cited by several authors in their publications. He was a member of the Uttar Pradesh State Council of Science and Technology and was associated with the Council of Scientific and Industrial Research as a member of their Catalyst Research Committee and Metals Research Committee. Mathur sat in the Working Group on Materials and Components of Electronics Commission of the Government of India as well as in the editorial board of the Indian Journal of Chemistry. His association with scientific organizations include memberships in Indian Chemical Society, American Physical Society, American Association for the Advancement of Science, Magnetic Resonance Spectroscopy Association of India and the International Diffusion Research Association and the fellowship of Sigma Xi. Mathur was an elected fellow of the Indian National Science Academy (1974) and the Indian Academy of Sciences (1975). The Council of Scientific and Industrial Research awarded him the Shanti Swarup Bhatnagar Prize, one of the highest Indian science awards, in 1973.

Mathur died on 12 January 1980 at the age of 51.

== Selected bibliography ==
=== Books ===
- Hirdaya Behari Mathur (1955). Radiochemical and Spectrometer Studies of Some New Nuclear Isomers Prepared by Cyclotron Bombardment. University of California, Berkeley.
- C.N.R. Rao (editor), H. B. Mathur (chapter) (2 December 2012). Spectroscopy in Inorganic Chemistry. Elsevier Science. ISBN 978-0-323-15090-3.

=== Articles ===
- Sharma, V. S.; Mathur, H. B.; Biswas, A. B. (1964). "Jahn-Teller stabilization and entropy changes accompanying the formation of metal-amino acid complexes". Journal of Inorganic and Nuclear Chemistry. 26 (2): 382–384. doi:10.1016/0022-1902(64)80084-1.
- Yagnik, C. M.; Mathur, H. B. (1967). "The Mossbauer spectra of sulpho-spinels containing Fe2+ ions". Solid State Communications. 5 (11): 841–844. Bibcode:1967SSCom...5..841Y. doi:10.1016/0038-1098(67)90310-9.
- Gupta, M. P.; Mathur, H. B. (1968). "Mossbauer spectra of oxidic spinels containing Sn4+ ion". Journal of Physics and Chemistry of Solids. 29 (8): 1479–1481. Bibcode:1968JPCS...29.1479G. doi:10.1016/0022-3697(68)90198-4.
- Mathur, H. B.; Gupta, M. P. (1969). "A Mossbauer spectroscopic study of the nature of the bonding in bis-dithioacetylacetone tetrachloro-ferrate (II)". Chemical Physics Letters. 3 (4): 191–194. Bibcode:1969CPL.....3..191M. doi:10.1016/0009-2614(69)80022-9.
- Rao, Balachandra; Mathu, H. B. (1971). "Thermodynamics of the interaction of transition metal ions with histamine". Journal of Inorganic and Nuclear Chemistry. 33 (3): 809–816. doi:10.1016/0022-1902(71)80481-5.

== See also ==
- Mossbauer spectroscopy
- Thermodynamics
