= Rekha Dikshit =

Indian former judge of Allahabad High Court

Hon'ble Ms. Justice (Retd.) Rekha Dikshit

Judge of Allahabad High Court
- In office 15 November 2016 – 9 August 2021
- Nominated by: T. S. Thakur
- Appointed by: Pranab Mukherjee

Personal details
- Born: 10 August 1959 (age 66)
- Education: Agra University

Rekha Dikshit (born 10 August 1959) is a former judge of Allahabad High Court, in Uttar Pradesh, India. She has been the trial judge in several notable cases, including the case of Mohd. Ahmed Khan v. Shah Bano Begum, a controversial case concerning the payment of maintenance to Muslim women in India, as well as the Taj Corridor case and the Uttar Pradesh NRHM scam.

== Life ==
Dikshit studied law at Agra University, and graduated in 1981. She is married to Pradeep Dubey, a lawyer who has acted as an advisor to the Governor of Uttar Pradesh and as principal secretary to the Uttar Pradesh Legislative Assembly.

== Career ==
Dikshit was appointed as a Principal Sessions Judge in 1984, and was promoted to District and Sessions Judge in 2013.

In 1988, Dikshit was a judicial magistrate in Lucknow and tried the case of Mohd. Ahmed Khan v. Shah Bano Begum, ruling that the respondent, Shah Bano, was entitled to maintenance payments from her husband. The ruling was affirmed by the Allahabad High Court and the Indian Supreme Court, and later resulted in the enactment of The Muslim Women (Protection of Rights on Divorce) Act 1986.

Dikshit also served as the district judge in Rae Bareli and Kanpur, and as a special judge in Lucknow in a Central Bureau of Investigation (CBI) Special Court for the investigation into the Taj Corridor case and the Uttar Pradesh NRHM scam.

She was appointed to the Allahabad High Court as an additional judge on 15 November 2016, and became a permanent judge on 23 March 2018.

As a High Court judge, Dikshit has directed the Uttar Pradesh government to conduct an inquiry into allegations of discrimination in the admission of students who belong to states outside Uttar Pradesh, in Uttar Pradesh medical schools. In 2016, she refused to allow a plea by a Bharatiya Janata Party worker to transfer the investigation into the 2015 Dadri mob lynching to the Central Bureau of Investigation, after the Uttar Pradesh police investigation revealed that the rumours that triggered the lynching were false. She retired on 9 August 2021.
