= Ajay Agarwal =

Indian politician and lawyer

- Born: 21 May 1965 (age 61); Chandausi, Uttar Pradesh, India
- Occupation: Lawyer

Ajay Agarwal (born 21 May 1965) is a lawyer in the Supreme Court of India and a politician. He was the candidate who represented the Bharatiya Janata Party from Rae Bareli in the 2014 Indian general election. During his tenure on the Supreme Court, he filed public interest litigations in several cases including the Bofors scandal, the Taj corridor case, and the fake stamp paper scam run by Abdul Karim Telgi.

In addition to being a professional advocate, he is also a social activist and contested many public interest litigation targeting alleged corruption at the highest level. His PIL in Taj corridor case led to the fall of Mayawati government in Uttar Pradesh in 2003. His another PIL for initiating CBI enquiry in Abdul Karim Telgi fake stamp scam case involving fifty thousand crores scam in 2003 also paid results and besides the supreme court ordered CBI enquiry in this matter, union government had to introduce E-stamping to stop the circulation of fake stamp scam paper. He had filed special leave petition in public interest in Bofors scam before the supreme court of India, when CBI failed to file it, because the permission to file SLP was denied to the CBI by the then UPA government because of the instructions by the UPA chairperson Sonia Gandhi. He also filed a criminal writ petition in Ottavio Quattrocchi case in January 2006 when an additional Solicitor General was sent to London by the union government to get the accounts of Ottavio Quattrocchi defrozen and Supreme Court had passed status quo of the London accounts. His another PIL in Commonwealth scam and IPL scam also brought positive results.

Ajay Agrawal filed public interest litigation before Supreme Court of India for fixing of RT PCR Test cost at Rs 400 per test while in some states the charges are as high as Rs 3600 /- per test. Supreme Court issued notice to the Central Government and state Governments and the price will start slashing down immediately. Now in Delhi, it is charged Rs 400/- per test as was demanded in the petition.

In 2014 Lok Sabha elections BJP has fielded him as its candidate in Rae Bareli to contest against UPA chairperson Sonia Gandhi where in he polled 173,721 votes. His Bofors matter which he got listed for final hearing, by mentioning before the Chief Justice of India, in the last week of October, 2014. He is also asked the CBI to open the entire investigation afresh in the light of many evidences which he had with himself.
