= Jing-Pha Tsai =

Computer scientist

- 蔡進發

President of Asia University
- Incumbent
- Assumed office 2010

Personal details
- Education: Tamkang University (MS); National Chiao Tung University (MS); Northwestern University (MA, PhD)
- Website: Official website

Jing-Pha Tsai (Chinese: 蔡進發), also known by his English name Jeffrey Tsai, is a Taiwanese computer scientist and the current president of Asia University in Taiwan.

== Education ==
After graduating from Taipei Municipal Chien Kuo High School, Tsai studied computer science at Tamkang University and graduated with a bachelor's degree. He then earned a master's degree in computer science from National Chiao Tung University in 1978 and completed doctoral studies in the United States at Northwestern University, where he earned a master's degree in electrical engineering and computer science in 1984 and his Ph.D. in electrical engineering and computer science in 1986.

== Career ==
He received his PhD degree in computer science from Northwestern University, and taught in the Department of Electrical Engineering and Computer Science at University of Illinois at Chicago from 1985 to 2010. He is an elected Fellow of the American Association for the Advancement of Science, the Institute for Electrical and Electronic Engineers, the Society for Design and Process Science(SDPS), and a Distinguished Fellow of the International Engineering and Technology Institute.

He is currently the Co-Editor-in-Chief of the International Journal on Artificial Intelligence Tools

== Awards and honors ==
- University Scholar Award from the University of Illinois Foundation
- IEEE Technical Achievement Award
- IEEE Meritorious Service Award
