= China Medical University (Taiwan) =

Private university in Taiwan

Coordinates: 24.1565°N 120.6812°E

- 中國醫藥大學
- Motto: 仁、慎、勤、廉
- Motto in English: Compassion, Prudence, Diligence, Integrity
- Type: Private
- Established: 1958
- President: Mien-Chie Hung
- Faculty: 530
- Undergraduates: 6,350
- Postgraduates: 635 (Master Degree); 317 (Doctoral Degree)
- Location: Taichung, Taiwan
- Campus: Taichung (main campus) Peikang (Yunlin County)
- Website: cm.cmu.edu.tw

Chinese name
- Traditional Chinese: 中國醫藥大學
Transcriptions
Standard Mandarin
- Hanyu Pinyin: Zhōngguó Yīyào Dàxué
Southern Min
- Hokkien POJ: Tiong-kok I-io̍h Tāi-ha̍k

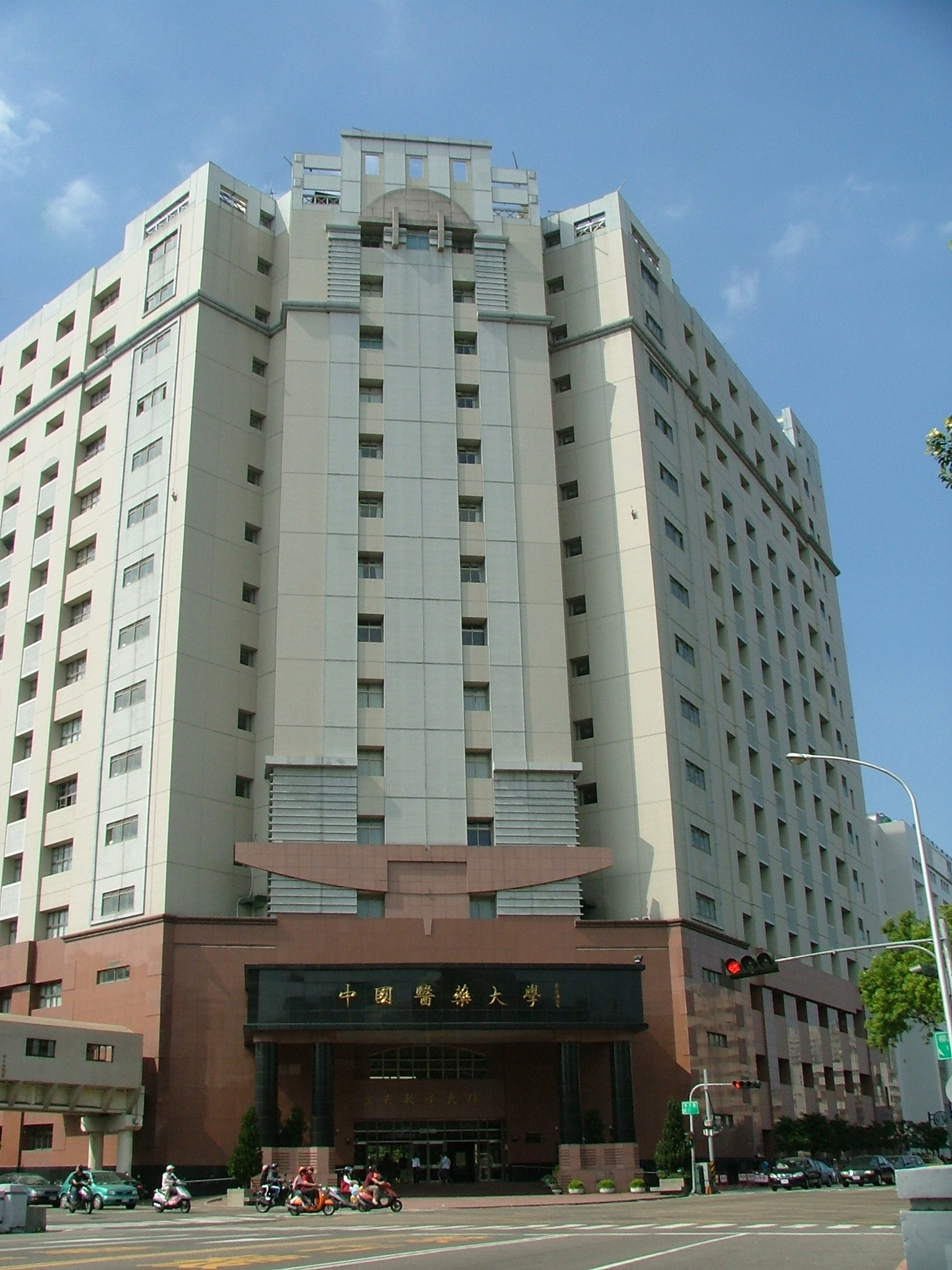
Li-Fu Hall

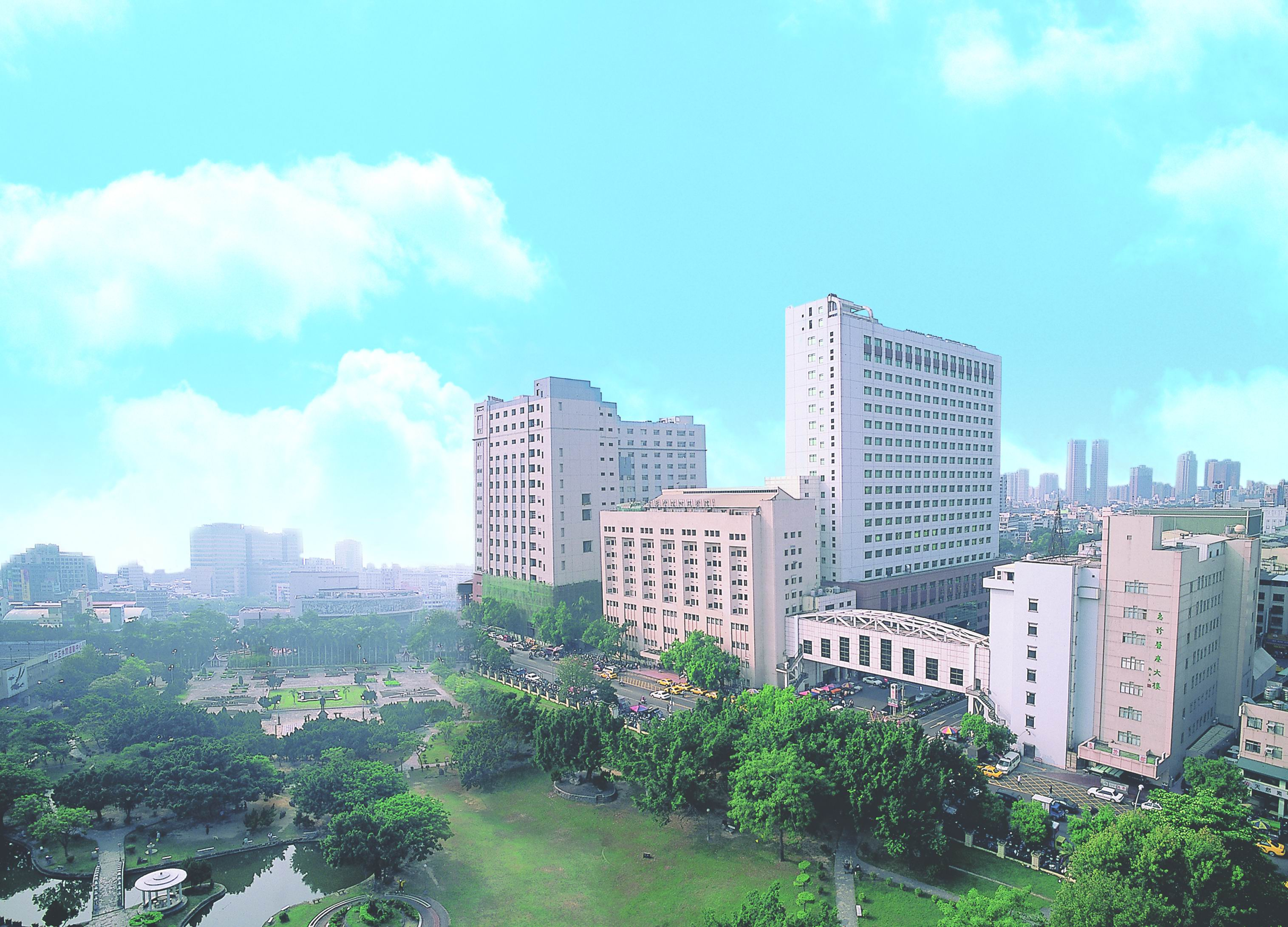
China Medical University Campus

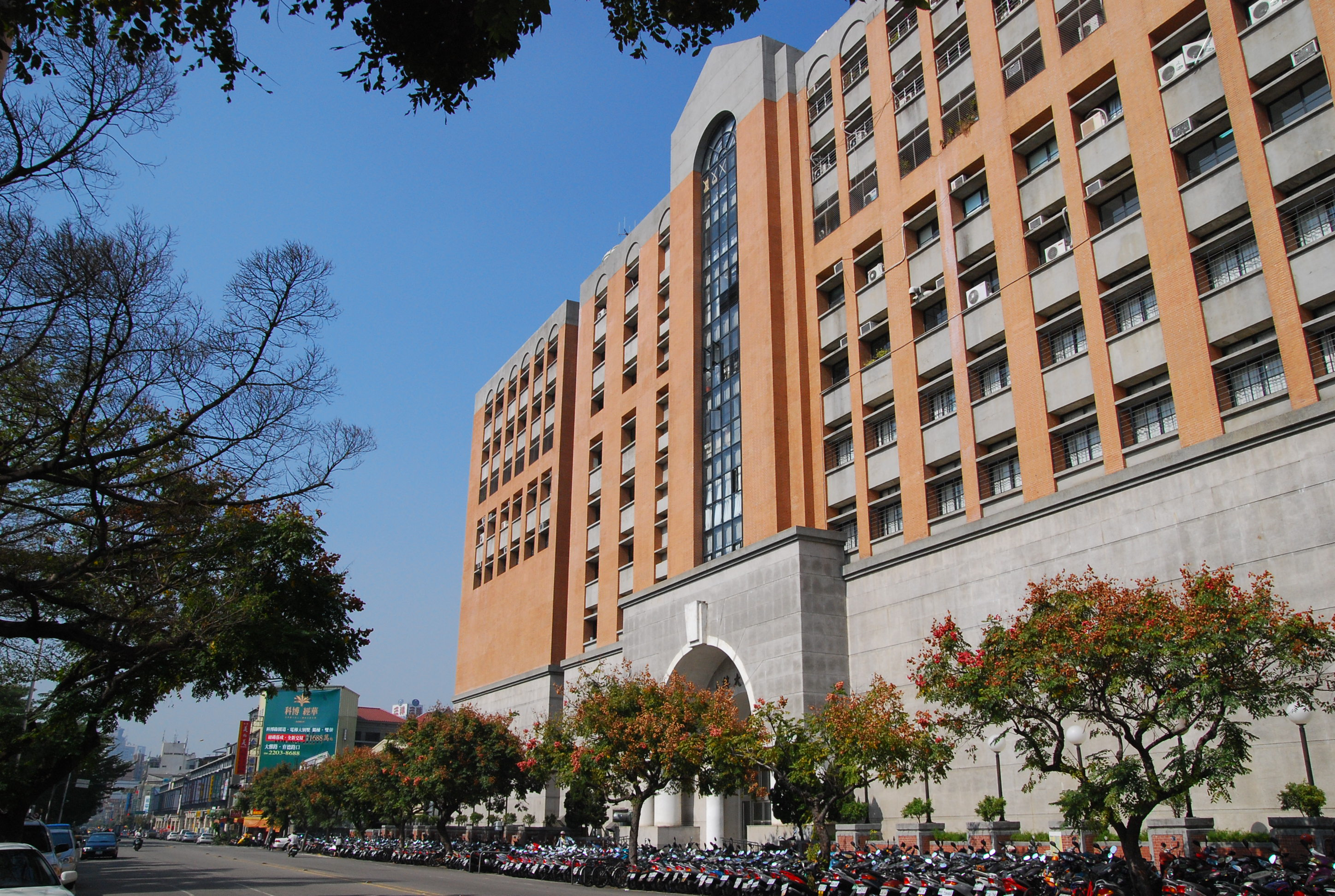
Huchu Hall

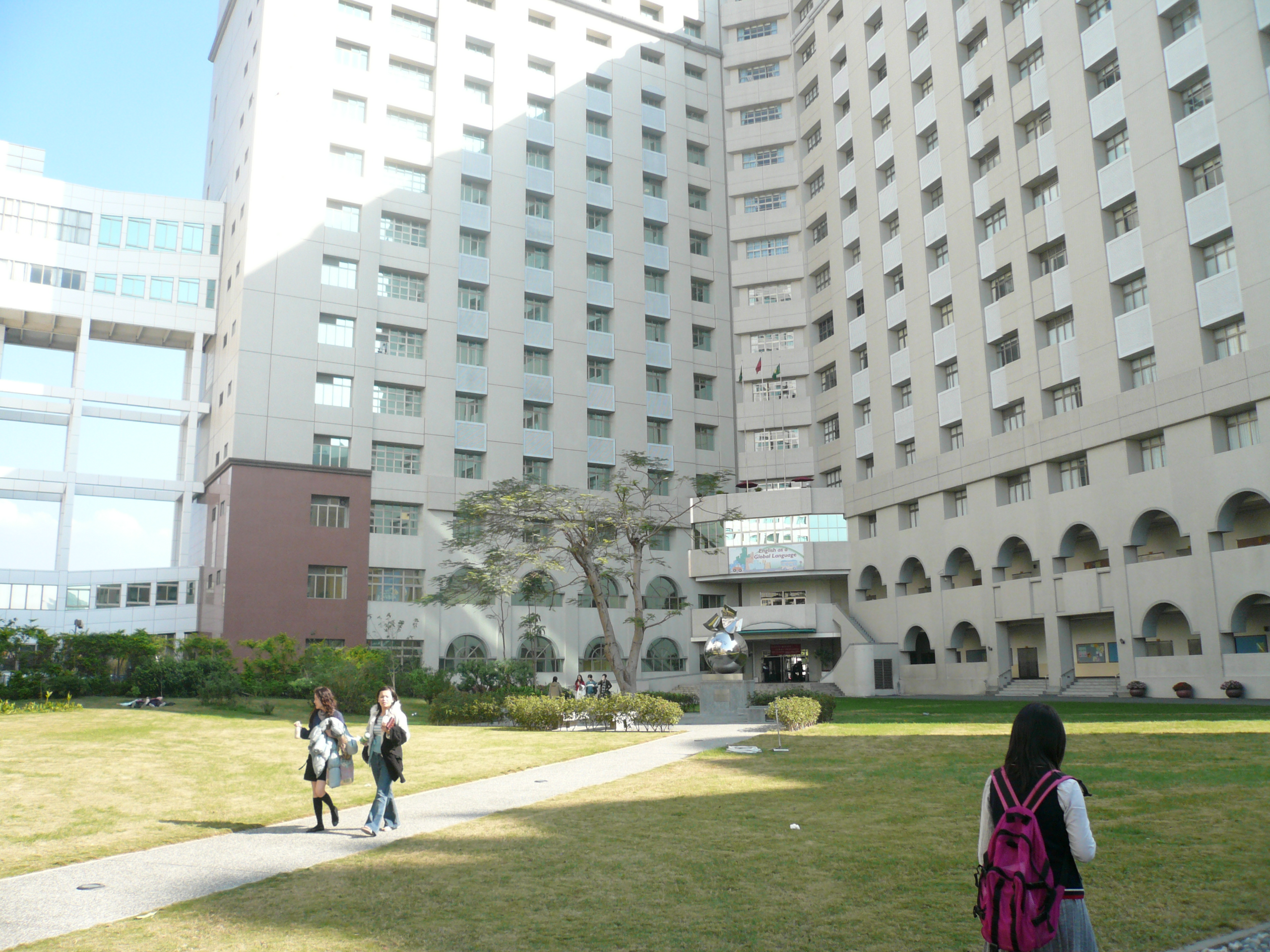
Lifu Hall

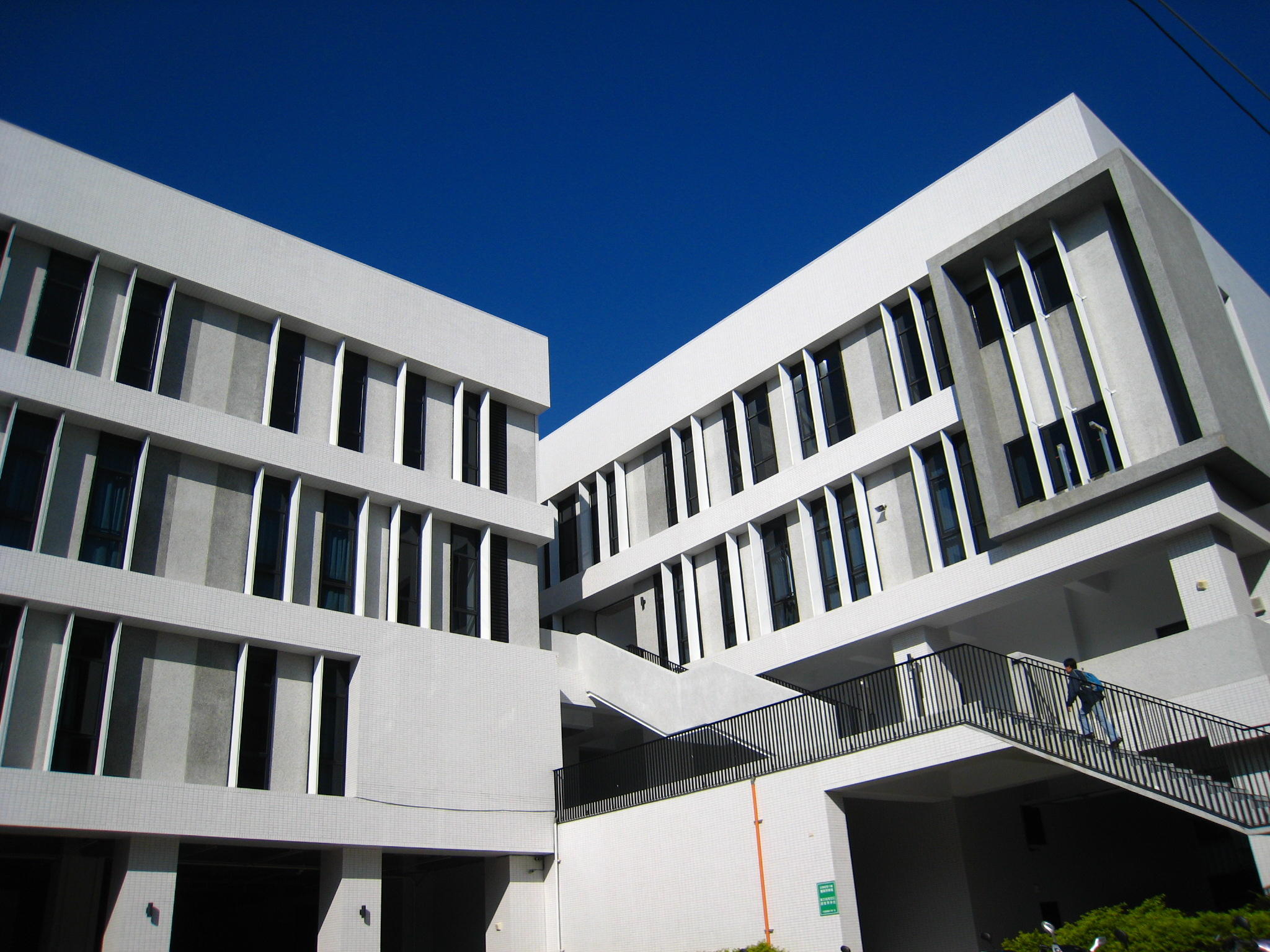
Ankang Campus

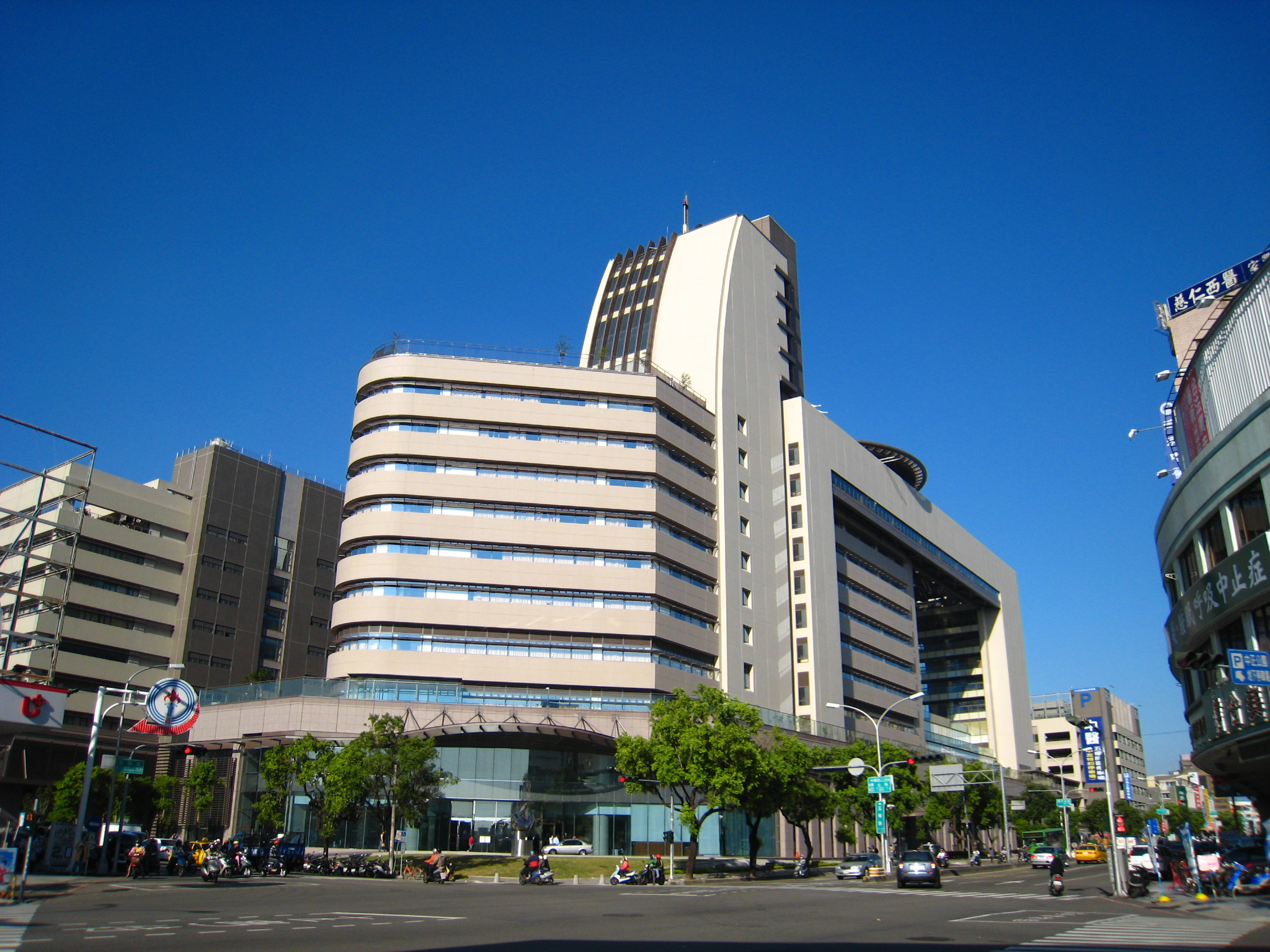
Wuquan campus

China Medical University (CMU; Chinese: 中國醫藥大學; Pe̍h-ōe-jī: Tiong-kok I-io̍h Tāi-ha̍k) is a private university in Taichung, Taiwan. The university has enrolled approximately 8,000 students.

== History ==
=== Brief Introduction ===
CMU was established as China Medical College (Chinese: 中國醫藥學院) on June 6, 1958, and was renamed to China Medical University in 2003. It is the first academic institution in Taiwan where Chinese professors offer medicine and pharmacy programs. The university has two major campuses, Taichung and Beigang;

CMU includes seven college degree programs these are: Western medicine, Chinese medicine, Pharmacy (including Chinese herbs), health care (including nursing), life sciences, public health, and management are provided.

=== Milestones ===
- 1958 – The establishment of China Medical College.
- 1980 – The establishment of China Medical College Taichung Hospital.
- 1984 – The establishment of China Medical College Beikang campus.
- 1985 – The establishment of China Medical College Beikang Hospital.
- 1997 – China Medical College Taichung Hospital was promoted to a Would-be Academic Medical Centers.
- 2000 – China Medical college Taichung Hospital was promoted to an Academic Medical Centers.
- 2003 – China Medical College was renamed as China Medical University.
- 2007 – Inauguration of Wuquan campus.
- 2008 – China Medical University Beikang Hospital was promoted to a Metropolitan Teaching Hospital
- 2010 – Ground breaking ceremony of the Build-Operate-Transfer (BOT) project for the planned Tainan Municipal Annan Hospital.
- 2014 – Center of Excellence for Chinese Medicine was awarded the Top-notch Research Center by the Ministry of Education.
- 2018 – Center of Excellence and New Drug Development Center was awarded the Top-notch Research Center by the Ministry of Education.
- 2018 – Chinese Medical University Hospital received Joint Commission International (JCI) Accreditation.

=== International Collaboration Network ===
- North America
  - University of Toronto (CA)
  - McMaster University (CA)
  - Brock University (CA)
  - University of Texas Health Science Center (US)
  - M. D. Anderson Cancer Center, University of Texas (US)
  - Ohio State University (US)
  - University of California, San Francisco (US)
  - Tulane University (US)
  - University of South Carolina (US)
  - Florida Atlantic University (US)
  - Millikin University (US)
  - Seton Hall University (US)
  - Southern California University of Health Sciences (US)
  - University of California, San Diego (US)
  - University of Mississippi Medical Center (US)
  - University of Oregon (US)
  - Expected (in 2008): University of Maryland (US); University of North Carolina at Chapel Hill (US)
- Central/South America
  - Universidad Autonoma de Centro America (CR)

- Asia
  - Nihon Pharmaceutical University (JP)
  - Kyung Hee University (KR)
  - Pusan National University (KR)
  - Beijing University of Chinese Medicine (CN)
  - China Medical University (Shenyang, CN)
  - China Pharmaceutical University (CN)
  - Fujian University of Traditional Chinese Medicine (CN)
  - Heilong Jiang University of Chinese Medicine (CN)
  - Nanjing University of Traditional Chinese Medicine (CN)
  - Shen Yang Pharmaceutical University (CN)
  - Zhejiang Chinese Medical University (CN)
  - Tung Wah Group of Hospitals (HK)
  - Mahidol University (TH)
  - University of Malaya (MY)
  - Universiti Tunku Abdul Rahman (MY)
  - Management and Science University (MY)
- Europe
  - University of Oradea (RO)
  - Vasile Goldis Western University of Arad (RO)
  - Palacký University (CZ)

== Organization ==
=== Campus locations ===
- Taichung (including Wuchuan and Ankang)
- Beigang

=== Centers and organizations ===
- Lifu Museum of Chinese Medicine
- Center for Faculty Development
- Center of International Affairs
- Computer Center
- Center for Continuing Education
- Arts Center
- Language Education Center
- Acupuncture Research Center
- Biostatistics Center
- Research Center for Biodiversity
- Biotechnology Incubation Center
- Chinese Herb Experimental Farm
- China Medical University Hospital
- China Medical University Beigang Hospital
- Cancer Research Center

== See also ==
- List of universities in Taiwan

University rankings

Global – Overall
- QS World: =509 (2026)
