= Ashok Jain (biotechnologist) =

Ashok Kumar Jain
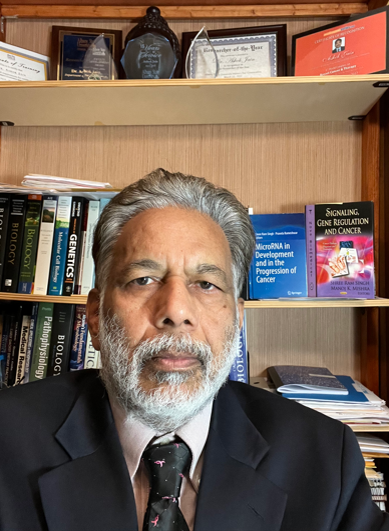
- Born: India
- Citizenship: American
- Occupations: Biotechnologist and academic

Academic background
- Education: B.S., Biological Sciences; M.S., Plant Sciences; Ph.D., Genetics and Plant Breeding
- Alma mater: Agra University

Academic work
- Institutions: Albany State University

Ashok Kumar Jain is an American biotechnologist, molecular biologist, breast cancer researcher, and academic. He is a professor at Albany State University.

Jain is most known for his research in bioengineering plants to boost Vitamin C content by incorporating a gene from animal pathways. He developed an epigenetic breast cancer research program to understand the molecular interaction of dietary food toxins [especially Heterocyclic Amines (HCAs), produced during cooking meat products at high temperatures such as barbecue] and phytonutrients that people consume. His works have been published in academic journals, including the Journal of Carcinogenesis and Mutagenesis and Cancer Letters. He has been awarded multiple 'Researcher of the Year' awards from Albany State University.

== Education and early career ==
Jain completed his B.S. in Biological Sciences in 1976, followed by an M.S. degree in plant sciences in 1978 from Agra University. He received his Ph.D. Degree in 1983, from the same institution under the supervision of R. K. S. Rathore. His thesis titled Induction and Transference of Fertility Restoring Capability in Bread Wheat (Triticum aestivum L) studied enhancing wheat cultivars by transferring male fertility restoration genes from American strains to high-yielding Indian cultivars, while also developing improved strains with golden yellow grains with male fertility restoration capability.

== Career ==
In his early career, Jain collaborated with the International Wheat Restorer Germplasm Screening Nursery to screen a universal pollen donner for hybrid seeds, involving 14 global partners, demonstrating that male fertility restoration genes in wheat are significantly affected by environmental conditions and growing seasons. In 1993, Jain joined Texas A&M University as a visiting scientist, later becoming a research associate there in 1995. In 1996, he went to India to serve as senior research officer and program leader in the Molecular Biology Division at CSRTI and returned to the U.S. in 1997 as a research associate at the University of Georgia, followed by an associate in research role at Florida A&M University from 1997 to 2003. He subsequently transitioned to a Research Scientist position before joining Albany State University, where he was an associate professor from 2005 to 2010. In March 2021, Steve Wrigley, chancellor of the University System of Georgia, named him as USG Leadership Fellow, along with three other faculty from Albany State University. At Albany State University, he has served as the program coordinator for the Biotechnology Concentration since 2009 and as the premed program adviser since 2012. He has been a professor at Albany State University since 2010.

== Research ==
In his early research, Jain investigated how introducing a rat gene for L-gulono-γ-lactone oxidase into tobacco and lettuce plants increased their vitamin C production, demonstrating that a single gene from the animal pathway could enhance plant ascorbic acid levels. In 1996, he developed a method for clonal propagation of Camptotheca acuminata by optimizing shoot formation with 6-benzyladenine and rooting with indole-3-butyric acid to improve mass propagation. At Texas A&M University, he created a genomic DNA library of Mulberry, isolated and characterized the Mahmg1 gene coding for HMGR, and found its expression was regulated by environmental and developmental cues, influencing isoprenoid synthesis during mulberry growth. Moreover, he also screened a cDNA library of Arabidopsis thaliana for genes encoding Strictosidine synthase (AtSS) and isolated, sequenced, and annotated three distinct genes based on their structural similarities.

In 2001, Jain used a differential display to identify 43 peanut transcripts affected by drought, finding that some were suppressed or altered under stress, with specific transcripts showing potential as markers for drought tolerance. Through his 2004 study, he characterized the peanut Gly-1 cDNA clone, revealing its glycinin protein with high sequence homology to other legumes, conserved domains, and specific expression during seed development. He continued his research and showed that curcumin reduced PhIP-induced DNA damage and ROS production, and modified the expression of genes related to antioxidant responses, DNA repair, and tumor suppression in breast epithelial cells.

Jain's research contributions also include developing the protocol for shoot organogenesis in mulberry and investigating the factors influencing the morphogenetic potential in callus cultures and regeneration. He also investigated optimal conditions for inducing androgenic callus and embryo development from Morus indica microspores, examining the effects of temperature, kinetin pretreatment, and various media on callus formation and embryo development. Moreover, he also examined how Mn^{2+} induced oxidative DNA damage and apoptosis in SH-SY5Y cells, revealing that while Mn^{2+} decreased cell viability and caused significant DNA damage, pre-treatment with antioxidants effectively mitigated these harmful effects.

== Awards and honors ==
- 2001 – Research Excellence Award, Florida A&M University
- 2020 – Top Professional in Science, Who is who in America
- 2020 – Leadership Fellow, University System of Georgia

== Selected articles ==
- Jain, A. K., & Basha, S. M. (2003). A capillary electrophoretic method for isolation and characterization of grape xylem proteins. African Journal of Biotechnology, 2(3), 66–70.
- Jain, A. K. (2004). Cloning and structural analysis of a cDNA clone encoding glycinin (Gly-1) seed storage protein of peanut. Electronic Journal of Biotechnology, 7(3), 03–04.
- Stephenson, A. P., Schneider, J. A., Nelson, B. C., Atha, D. H., Jain, A., Soliman, K. F., ... & Reams, R. R. (2013). Manganese-induced oxidative DNA damage in neuronal SH-SY5Y cells: attenuation of thymine base lesions by glutathione and N-acetylcysteine. Toxicology letters, 218(3), 299–307.
- Jain, A., Samykutty, A., Jackson, C., Browning, D., Bollag, W. B., Thangaraju, M., ... & Singh, S. R. (2015). Curcumin inhibits PhIP induced cytotoxicity in breast epithelial cells through multiple molecular targets. Cancer letters, 365 (1), 122–131.
- Jain, A. (2016). Curcumin inhibits PhIP-induced carcinogenicity by regulating Nrf2 and FOXO targets. Journal of Carcinogenesis & Mutagenesis, 6(236).
- Jain, A. (2019). Curcumin suppresses PhIP induced inflammatory protein expression in breast epithelial cells. Cancer Research, 79 (13_Supplement), 2346-2346.
