= Desh Pal S. Verma =

Plant cell and molecular biologist

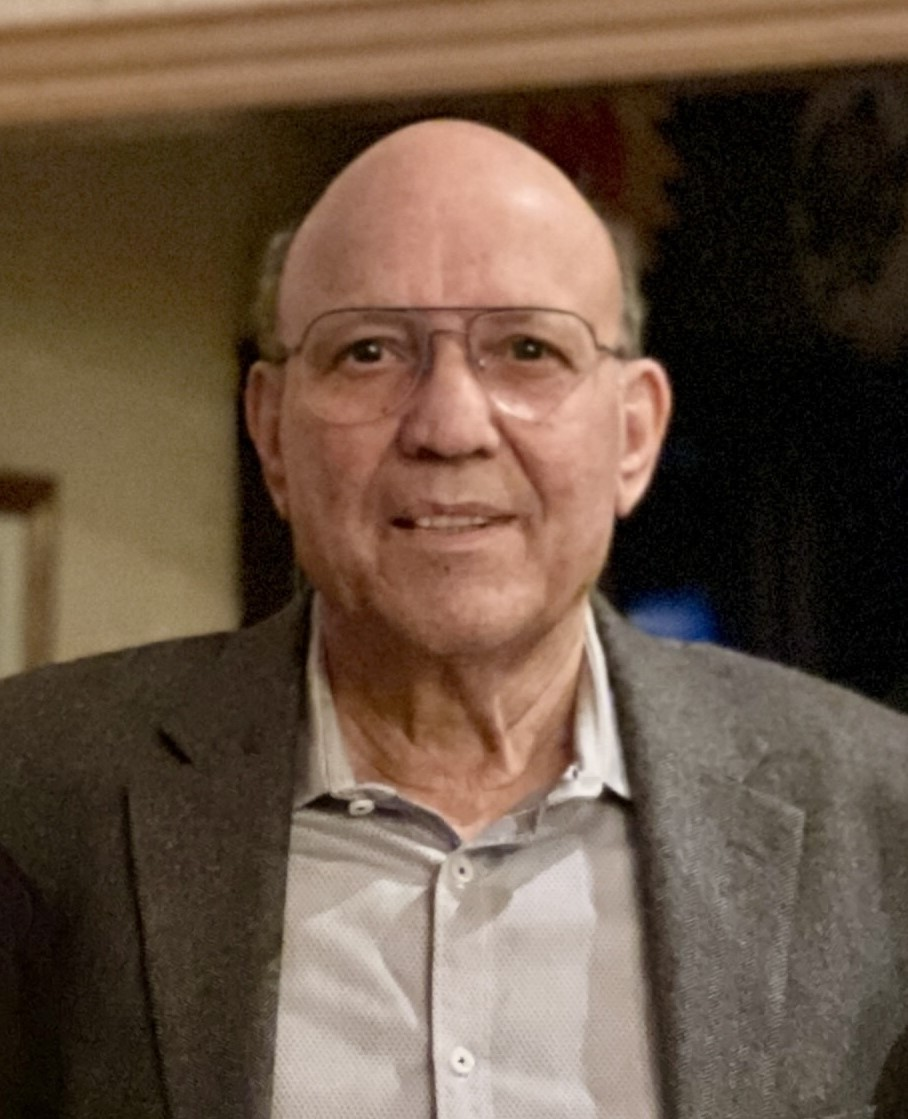
Desh Verma

Desh Pal Singh Verma (1944 - 2025) was a plant cell and molecular biologist and professor emeritus in the Department of Molecular Genetics at The Ohio State University. He earned a master's degree in botany from Agra University in 1964 and a Ph.D. in botany from the University of Western Ontario in 1970. Following his doctoral studies, he conducted postdoctoral research at the Fox Chase Cancer Center in Philadelphia from 1971 to 1972. In 1974, he joined McGill University as an assistant professor.

== Career ==
Desh Pal Singh Verma FRSC FTWAS was a plant molecular biologist known for his contributions to molecular genetics. He began his career at McGill University in Canada, where he served as a faculty member from 1974 to 1987. In 1981, he was awarded the E.W.R. Steacie Memorial Fellowship by the National Research Council of Canada, presented by the Governor General of Canada, Edward Schreyer. ] In 1986, Verma was elected a Fellow of the Royal Society of Canada and became a member of the Canadian Academy of Sciences.

In 1987, he served as a senior editor for the International Society of Molecular Plant-Microbe Interactions (IS-MPMI), which later launched the journal Molecular Plant-Microbe Interactions, where he served as co-editor. The following year, he joined The Ohio State University as professor and associate director of the Biotechnology Center in the Department of Molecular Genetics. In 2003, he was elected a Fellow of The World Academy of Sciences (TWAS) ), based in Trieste, Italy.

At The Ohio State University, Verma participated in multiple interdisciplinary graduate programs, including molecular biology, cellular biology, developmental biology, applied plant sciences, plant pathology, and biochemistry.

Verma’s research has included the isolation of the first plant mRNA, cloning of the first soybean leghemoglobin gene, and the identification of several novel genes referred to as nodulins, including one encoding the enzyme Uricase.

Throughout his career, Verma trained over 100 graduate students, postdoctoral researchers, and visiting scientists.

== Select publications ==
Verma authored over 200 peer-reviewed research publications and edited 11 academic books. Over the course of his career, he was an invited speaker at numerous international scientific conferences. He also served as a consultant to several companies and was an advisor to the Planning Commission of India (now NITI Aayog) on agricultural biotechnology from 2006 to 2011.

- Verma, DPS; Nash, Dudley T.; Schulman, Herbert M. (October 1974). "Isolation and in vitro translation of soybean leghaemoglobin mRNA". Nature. 251 (5470): 74–77. Bibcode:1974Natur.251...74V. doi:10.1038/251074a0. PMID 4414006.
- Baulcombe, D. and D.P.S. Verma (1978). Preparation of a complementary DNA for leghemoglobin and direct demonstration that leghemoglobin is encoded by the soybean genome. Nucl. Acids Res. 5: 4141-4153.
- Verma, DPS; Legocki, Roman P. (June 1980). "Identification of "nodule-specific" host proteins (nodulins) involved in the development of Rhizobium-Legume symbiosis". Cell. 20 (1).
- Verma, DPS; Bergmann, H; Preddie, E (February 1983). "Nodulin-35: A subunit of specific uricase (uricase II) induced and localized in the uninfected cells of soybean nodules". EMBO Journal. 2 (12): 2333–2339. Bibcode:1983EMBO....2.2333B. doi:10.1002/j.1460-2075.1983.tb01743.x. PMC 555454. PMID 16453488.
- Hu, Chien-An Andy; Delauney, Ashton; Verma, DPS (October 1992). "A Bifunctional Enzyme (Delta^1Pyrroline5Carboxylate Synthetase) Catalyzes the First Two Steps in Proline Biosynthesis in Plants". PNAS. 89 (19): 9354–9358. Bibcode:1992PNAS...89.9354H. doi:10.1073/pnas.89.19.9354. PMC 50125. PMID 1384052.
