= Virendra Singh (physicist) =

Indian physicist (born 1938)

- Born: 8 June 1938 (age 88); Bijnor, British Raj
- Education: Deva Nagri Inter college; Meerut College; Agra University; University of California, Berkeley; Lawrence Berkeley National Laboratory; California Institute of Technology; Institute for Advanced Study
- Known for: Studies on High energy physics
- Awards: 1973 Shanti Swarup Bhatnagar Prize; 1979 UGC Meghnad Saha Award; 1995 Goyal Prize; 1996 ISCA C. V. Raman Birth Centenary Gold Medal
- Scientific career
- Fields: Theoretical physics
- Workplaces: Tata Institute of Fundamental Research; Rockefeller University
- Doctoral advisor: Geoffrey Chew; Murray Gell-Mann

Virendra Singh (born 8 June 1938) is an Indian theoretical physicist and a former C. V. Raman chair professor and director of the Tata Institute of Fundamental Research (TIFR). Known for his research in high energy physics, Singh is an elected fellow of all the three major Indian science academies - Indian National Science Academy, Indian Academy of Sciences and National Academy of Sciences, India as well as The World Academy of Sciences. The Council of Scientific and Industrial Research, the apex agency of the Government of India for scientific research, awarded him the Shanti Swarup Bhatnagar Prize for Science and Technology, one of the highest Indian science awards, for his contributions to Physical Sciences in 1973. (Note: Long link – please select award year to see details)

== Biography ==
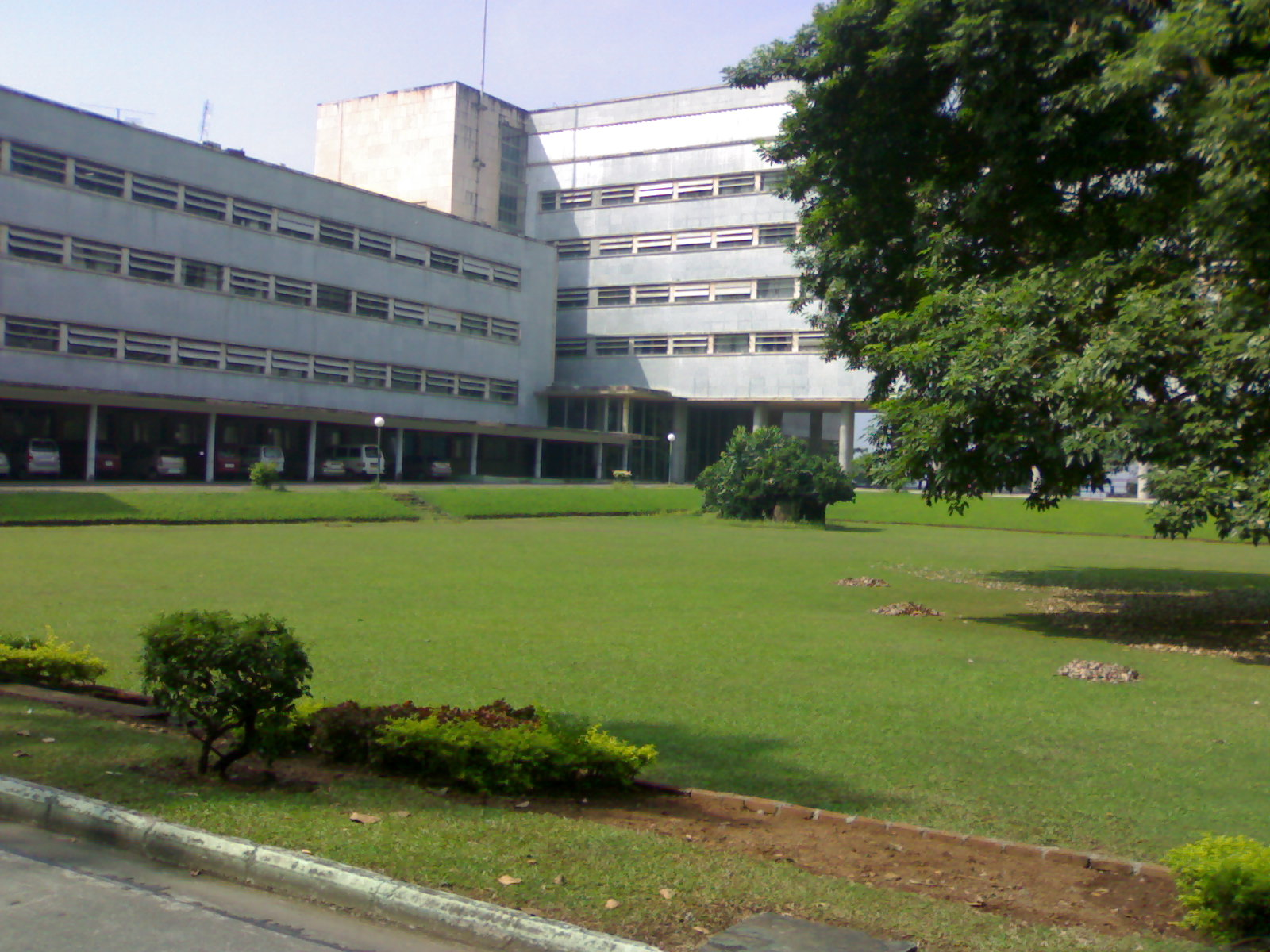
Tata Institute of Fundamental Research

=== Early life and education ===
Born in Bijnor in the Indian state of Uttar Pradesh, Singh completed his schooling at Dev Nagri Inter College, Meerut in 1951 and passed the intermediate course from Meerut College of Agra University in 1953. After earning a BSc in physics, chemistry and mathematics in 1955 and an MSc in physics in 1957 from the same institution, he joined Tata Institute of Fundamental Research as a research assistant the same year. Subsequently, taking a sabbatical from service, he enrolled for doctoral studies at University of California, Berkeley and worked under the guidance of Geoffrey Chew, known for his contributions to the fields of mesons and bootstrap model, to secure a PhD in 1962. He stayed in the US to complete his post-doctoral work at three institutions, Lawrence Berkeley National Laboratory (1959–62) as a graduate student, California Institute of Technology (1962–63) as a research fellow with Murray Gell-Mann and Institute for Advanced Study, Princeton (1963–64) as a member.

=== Career ===
On his return to India in 1964, he resumed his career at TIFR and served the institution in such various capacities as a professor (1970–81), senior professor (1981–90), and a professor of eminence till his superannuation from service in 2003. During this period, he held the directorship of the institution from 1987 to 1997. Post-retirement, he continued his association with TIFR as a C. V. Raman Research Professor of the Indian National Science Academy till 2008. In between, he had two short stints at Rockefeller University, first as a visiting associate professor during (1966–67) and then as a visiting professor during (1971–72). When the Indian Physics Association and the Institute of Physics jointly introduced an exchange lecture program in honor of John Douglas Cockcroft, Ernest Thomas Sinton Walton and Homi J. Bhabha in 1998, he was the first to deliver the Homi Bhabha lecture in 2000.

=== Personal life ===
Singh lives in Andheri west in Mumbai.

== Legacy ==
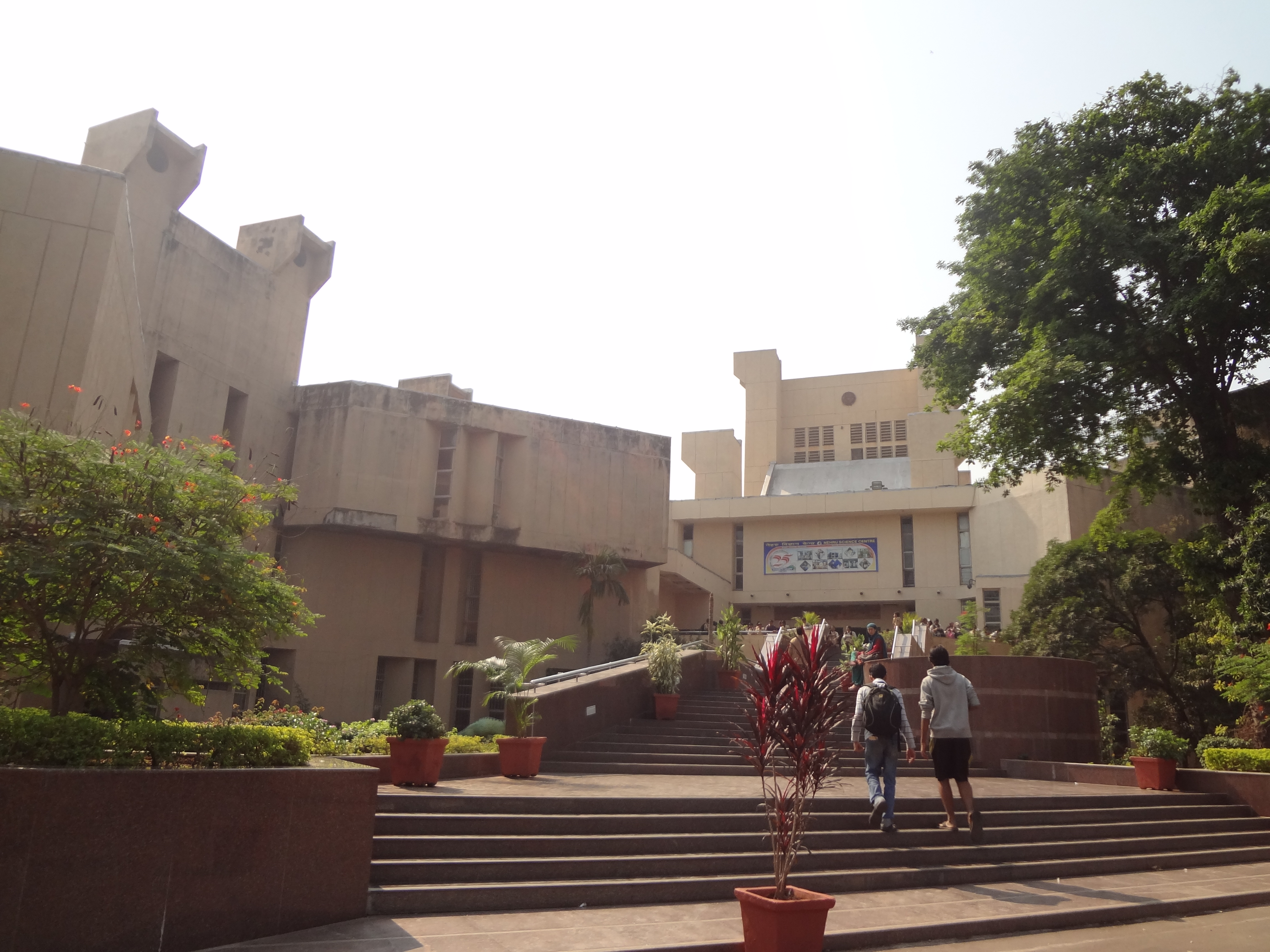
Nehru Science Center

Singh's studies spanned the fields of high energy physics, quantum mechanics and particle physics and he has made reportedly significant contributions on S-matrix theory and symmetry theories of hadrons. His collaboration with Virendra Gupta resulted in the development of Gupta-Singh coupling constant sum rule related to baryon decuplet and he worked along M. A. Beg to develop the Beg-Singh SU (6) mass formula. His theoretical work on scattering amplitudes have helped widen the understanding of high energy total cross-sections in hadronic processes. He proposed Singh lemma, a method of calculating the threshold value of the amplitude from the gauge condition. His other contributions include Singh-Pais theorems and Singh-Roy bounds related to compton scattering and scattering amplitudes. His studies have been documented by way of a number of articles (Note: Please see Selected bibliography section) and the article repository of the Indian Academy of Sciences has listed 84 of them. Besides, he has contributed chapters to books published by others including a lecture in a book edited by B. V. Sreekantan and Scientific Realism and Classical Physics, a general article published in History and Philosophy of Physics published by Indian Council of Philosophical Research. His work has also drawn citations from other authors.

=== Professional associations ===
On the academic front, he was instrumental in organizing a school of research on theoretical physics at Tata Institute of Fundamental Research, along with Bhalchandra Udgaonkar. He has been a member of the editorial boards of Indian Journal of Pure and Applied Physics (1974–76 & 1989–91), Indian Journal of Pure and Applied Mathematics (1975–77), Pramana (1982–89), Comments on Nuclear and Particle Physics (1985–92) and Asia-Pacific Physics Newsletter (1990). He chaired the board of research in nuclear science of the Department of Atomic Energy and sat in the commission on particles and fields of International Union of Pure and Applied Physics from 1986 to 1993. He was the vice president of the Indian Physics Association for 1983–84 and presided the association from 1985 to 1987. He served as the chairman of the Mumbai chapter of Society for Applied Microwave Electronics Engineering & Research (SAMEER) of the Ministry of Electronics and Information Technology (1993–97) and the Nehru Science Centre (1994–96). He has been associated with the Indian Academy of Sciences as a council member (1977–82) and with National Academy of Sciences, India as the president of its Mumbai chapter (2001–07). He has also been a member of the councils of a number of institutes and associations which included Indian Statistical Institute (1986–88), Saha Institute of Nuclear Physics (1987–92), Indian Science News Association (1994–2001) and National Council of Science Museums (1994–98).

== Awards and honors ==
The Indian Academy of Sciences elected Singh as a fellow in 1970 and the Council of Scientific and Industrial Research awarded him the Shanti Swarup Bhatnagar Prize, one of the highest Indian science awards in 1973. He became an elected fellow of the Indian National Science Academy in 1975 and four years later, the university Grants Commission of India selected him for the 1979 Meghnad Saha Award. He received the fellowship of the National Academy of Sciences, India in 1989 and the Goyal Prize for Physical Sciences in 1995. The Indian Science Congress Association awarded him the C. V. Raman Birth Centenary Gold Medal in 1996 and The World Academy of Sciences elected him as their fellow in 1999. He is also a fellow of the Institute of Physics and the award orations delivered by him include K. R. Ramanathan Memorial Lecture of Physical Research Laboratory (1995), Bicentennial Lecture of Indian Institute of Astrophysics (1995), S. N. Bose Memorial Lecture of S.N. Bose National Centre for Basic Sciences (1995), S. N. Bose Memorial Lecture of Kolkata Mathematical Society (1995), Meghnad Saha Lecture of National Academy of Sciences, India (1996) and Bhabha Memorial Lecture of the Institution of Electronics and Telecommunication Engineers (1997).

== Selected bibliography ==
=== Chapters ===
- Proceedings of the Tenth International Workshop on the Physics of Semiconductor Devices : (December 14 – 18, 1999) [New Delhi]. 2(2000). Allied Publishers. 2000. pp. 1459–. ISBN 978-81-7023-998-7.
- Spenta R. Wadia (2007). The Legacy of Albert Einstein: A Collection of Essays in Celebration of the Year of Physics. World Scientific. pp. 165–. ISBN 978-981-277-271-8.
- B.V. Sreekantan (2010). Remembering Einstein: Lectures on Physics and Astrophysics. Oxford University Press. p. 164. ISBN 978-0198064497.
- P. Ghosh (V. Singh – chapter) (2008). History and Philosophy of Physics. Indian Council of Philosophical Research. arXiv:0805.1780. Bibcode:2008arXiv0805.1780S.

=== Articles ===
- Virendra Gupta, Virendra Singh (1964). "Sum Rules for Coupling Constants in Broken SU (3) Symmetry". Physical Review. 136 (B782): B782–B786. Bibcode:1964PhRv..136..782G. doi:10.1103/PhysRev.136.B782.
- Virendra Singh (1967). "New Low-Energy Theorem for Compton Scattering". Phys. Rev. Lett. 19 (730): 730–734. Bibcode:1967PhRvL..19..730S. doi:10.1103/PhysRevLett.19.730.
- S. M. Roy, Virendra Singh (1995). "Causal Quantum Mechanics Treating Position and Momentum Symmetrically". Modern Physics Letters A. 10 (8): 709–716. arXiv:hep-ph/9410378. Bibcode:1995MPLA...10..709R. doi:10.1142/S0217732395000752. S2CID 119464132.
- Virendra Singh (1997). "Causal quantum mechanics". Pramana. 49 (1): 5–16. Bibcode:1997Prama..49....5S. doi:10.1007/BF02856334. S2CID 122038060.
- Virendra Singh (2009). "Bhabha's contributions to elementary particle physics and cosmic rays research". Resonance. 14 (5): 430–454. arXiv:0905.2264. Bibcode:2009arXiv0905.2264S. doi:10.1007/s12045-009-0045-1. S2CID 17616577.

== See also ==
- Rutherford scattering
- Coulomb scattering state
- Eightfold Way (physics)
