= Dr. Bhimrao Ambedkar University =

Public university in Agra, Uttar Pradesh

- Seal of Dr. Bhimrao Ambedkar University
- Former name: Agra University
- Motto: Tamaso mā jyotir gamaya
- Motto in English: Lead us from darkness to light
- Established: 1927 (99 years ago)
- Chancellor: Governor of Uttar Pradesh
- Vice-Chancellor: Ashu Rani
- Location: Agra, Uttar Pradesh, India; 27.1991°N 78.0155°E
- Campus: Urban
- Colors: Blue white
- Website: dbrau.ac.in//

Dr. Bhimrao Ambedkar University, formerly Agra University, is an autonomous university located in Agra, Uttar Pradesh, India. The university, formerly named as Agra University, was later named after Bhimrao Ambedkar.

== Affiliated colleges ==
The University's jurisdiction extends over the four districts of the Agra Division, namely Agra, Mainpuri, Firozabad, and Mathura.

== Institute of Engineering and Technology ==
The Institute of Engineering and Technology Khandari, Agra (I.E.T. Khandari, Agra), situated at the Khandari campus in the city of Agra, was established in 1998 and is the engineering institute of the university.

== Institute of Social Sciences ==
The Institute of Social Sciences (ISS), Agra is situated at Paliwal campus in university premises.

== Notable alumni ==
- Charan Singh, former Prime Minister of India
- Atal Bihari Vajpayee, former Prime Minister of India
- Mulayam Singh Yadav, former Chief Minister of Uttar Pradesh
- Kalyan Singh, former Chief Minister of Uttar Pradesh
- Santosh Gangwar, 12th Governor of Jharkhand and former Chairperson of Committee on public undertakings
- Khurshed Alam Khan, former Karnataka and Goa Governor
- Dronamraju Krishna Rao, geneticist
- Ganesh Prasad Pandey, organic chemist, Shanti Swarup Bhatnagar laureate
- Hirdaya Behari Mathur, physical chemist, Shanti Swarup Bhatnagar laureate
- H. N. Kunzru, Freedom Fighter, First National Commissioner of Bharat Scouts and Guides & first President of the Children's Film Society.
- Javed Agrewala, molecular biologist, Shanti Swarup Bhatnagar laureate
- M. V. George, photochemist, Shanti Swarup Bhatnagar laureate
- Om Dutt Gulati, pharmacologist, Shanti Swarup Bhatnagar and B. C. Roy laureate
- Shyam Sunder Kapoor, nuclear physicist, Shanti Swarup Bhatnagar laureate
- Virendra Singh, theoretical physicist, Shanti Swarup Bhatnagar laureate
- Y. D. Sharma, molecular biologist, Shanti Swarup Bhatnagar laureate
- Gopal Krishna, radio astronomer, Shanti Swarup Bhatnagar laureate
- Rajendra Yadav, pioneer of the Hindi literary movement
- Arun Govil, television and film actor MP, Meerut (2024-present)
- Aziz Qureshi, former governor
- Shafiqur Rahman Barq, MP (Uttar pradesh)
- Awadhesh Prasad, MP, former Cabinet minister of Uttar pradesh
- Ramakant Yadav, ex-VC of Uttar Pradesh University of Medical Sciences
- Dev Swarup, ex-VC of Dr. Bhimrao Ambedkar Law University
- Ram Gopal Yadav, MP (Rajya Sabha)
- Dhatri Saran Mathur, I.C.S and Chief Justice of Allahabad High Court
- Devendra Singh Yadav, former MP
- Ajit Doval, 5th National Security Advisor of India, with the precedence of a Cabinet Minister
- Raj Babbar, Indian film actor and politician
- Ibn-e-Safi, Urdu-language novelist, author of Jasoosi Duniya series.
- Narinder Singh Kapany, Physicist known as 'Father of Fibre Optics', and Padma Vibhushan awardee
- Rekha Dikshit, former judge of Allahabad High Court
- Ashok Jain, Professor at Albany State University
- Shyam Sundar Shyam- former member of Madhya Pradesh Legislative Assembly
- Tabish Mehdi, Indian poet and writer
- Tejpal Singh - former MLA
- Desh Pal S. Verma - biologist
- O. K. Harsh, International Academic & Research Advisor of Brit College, BCET, London. Ex Pro-Chancellor (addl) & Ex Vice-Chancellor of Glocal University, and Ex Vice-Chancellor of Tantia University.
