= Ganesh Prasad Pandey =

Indian chemist (born 1954)

- Born: 5 July 1954 (age 72); Uttar Pradesh, India
- Education: Dr. Bhimrao Ambedkar University; Banaras Hindu University; Purdue University
- Known for: Studies on photo-induced single electron transfer reactions and natural products synthesis
- Awards: 1988 CSIR Young Scientist Award; 1990 B. M. Birla Science Prize; 1999 Shanti Swarup Bhatnagar Prize; 2002 GoUP Vigyan Ratna Samman
- Scientific career
- Fields: Organic chemistry
- Workplaces: Panjab University; Indian Institute of Chemical Technology; National Chemical Laboratory; Banaras Hindu University
- Doctoral advisor: Harry Morrison

Ganesh Prasad Pandey (born 5 July 1954) is an Indian organic chemist and scientist at the National Chemical Laboratory. He is known for his research on photo-induced single electron transfer reactions and the synthesis of natural products. He is an elected fellow of the Indian National Science Academy the National Academy of Sciences, India and the Indian Academy of Sciences. The Council of Scientific and Industrial Research, the apex agency of the Government of India for scientific research, awarded him the Shanti Swarup Bhatnagar Prize for Science and Technology, one of the highest Indian science awards, in 1999, for his contributions to chemical sciences. He is currently working as a distinguished professor at Banaras Hindu University.

== Biography ==
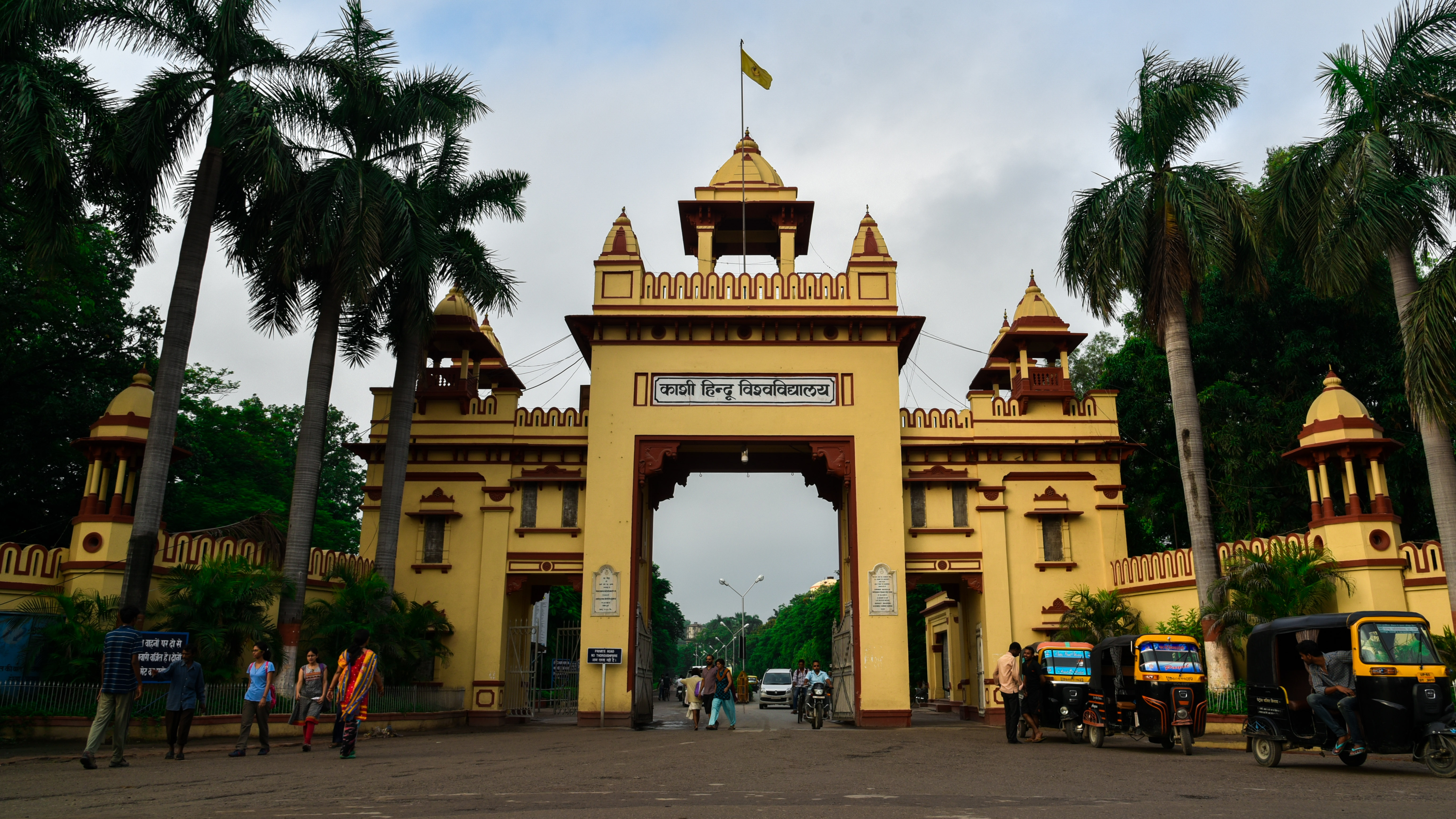
Banaras Hindu University

G. P. Pandey, born on 5 July 1954 in the Indian state of Uttar Pradesh, graduated in chemistry from Dr. Bhimrao Ambedkar University and completed his master's degree from the same university. Subsequently, he enrolled for his doctoral studies at Banaras Hindu University from where he secured a PhD and moved to the US in 1980 to pursue his post-doctoral studies at the laboratory of Harry Morrison of Purdue University. After completing his studies on the photobiology of urocanic acid, he returned to India in 1983 and joined Panjab University as a pool officer the same year. However, his stay at the university lasted only a few months and he joined the Indian Institute of Chemical Technology (IICT), Hyderabad in 1984 as a scientist. He served the institute for 7 years before shifting his base to the National Chemical Laboratory, Pune in 1991 as an E2-Grade scientist. He is associated with Molecular Science Laboratory of Sanjay Gandhi Postgraduate Institute of Medical Sciences where he serves as a scientist.

== Legacy ==
Pandey's early researches were based on photobiology and radical ions initiated by photoinduced electron transfer (PET). Later, he used the PET reactions for organic synthesis and his studies are reported to have widened the understanding of these processes. He leads a team of scientists at NCL who are involved in investigations on target oriented synthesis of natural products and biologically active compounds and the team has developed novel carbon-carbon bond forming reactions assisting in total synthesis of natural products. They have also done extensive studies on glycosidase inhibitors with regard to their design, synthesis and evaluation. His research has been published as chapters in books authored by others as well as several peer-reviewed scientific articles; ResearchGate, an online repository of science articles, has listed 134 of them. He is the vice-chair of the National Organic Symposium Trust (NOST) and serves as an editor of the Tetrahedron journal.

== Awards and honors ==
Pandey received the Young Scientist Award of the Council of Scientific and Industrial Research in 1988 and the B. M. Birla Science Prize in 1990. The Council of Scientific and Industrial Research honored him again with the Shanti Swarup Bhatnagar Prize, one of the highest Indian science awards, in 1999. He has delivered several award orations including the Professor N. S. Narasimhan Lecture Award of 1998, Professor R. C. Shah Memorial Lecture of 1999, and Professor T. R. Seshadri 70th Birthday Commemoration Lecture of 2003. He was elected by the Indian Academy of Sciences as their fellow in 1995. and he became an elected fellow of the Indian National Science Academy in 1999. He is also an elected fellow of the National Academy of Sciences, India.

== See also ==
- Photoinduced electron transfer
