= Institute of Social Sciences, Agra =

- Established: 1955
- Director: Prof. Diwakar Khare
- Location: Paliwal Park, Agra, Uttar Pradesh, India
- Website: Institute of Social Sciences

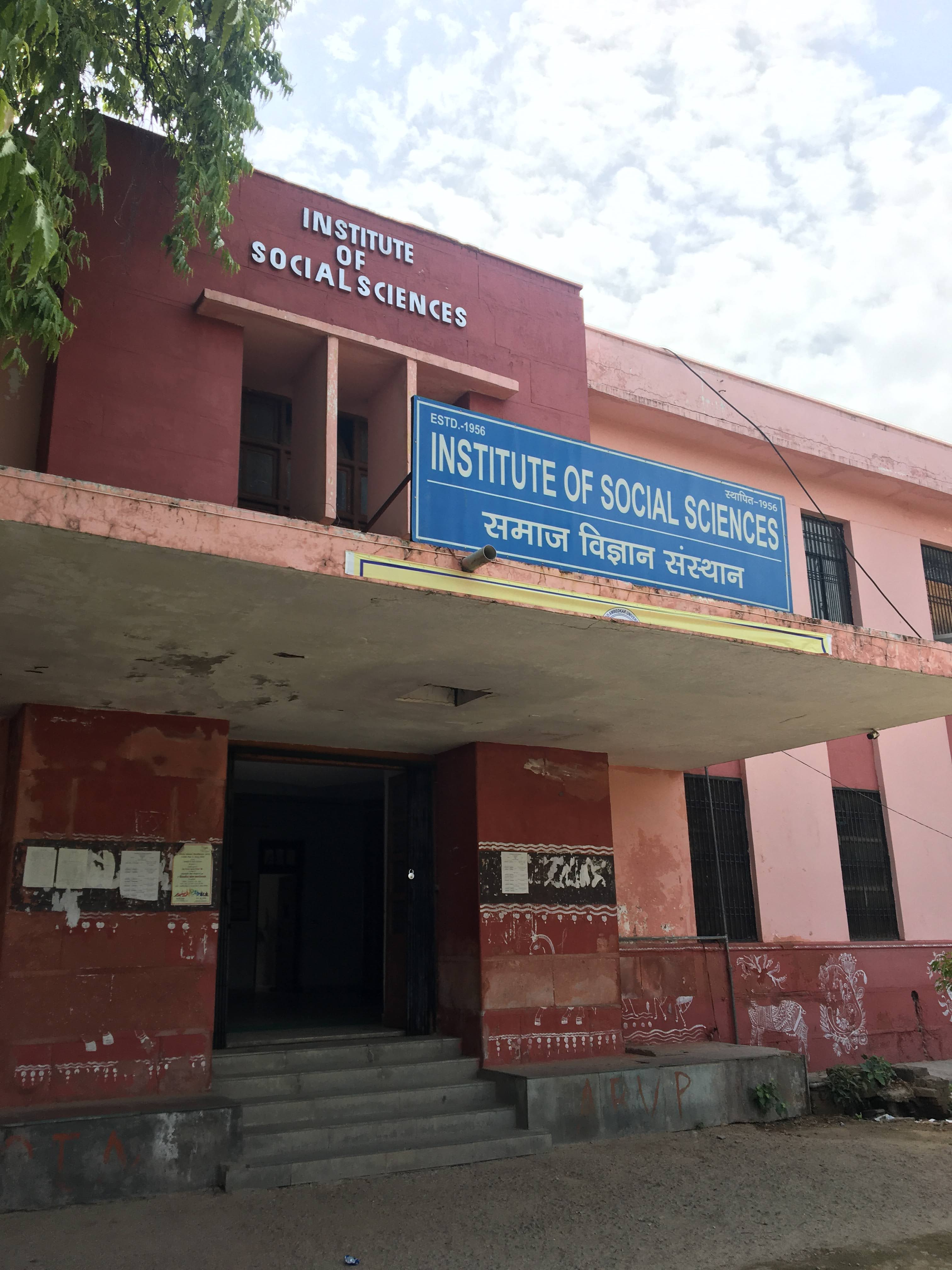

The Institute of Social Sciences, Agra (ISS), is an institute of Dr. B. R. Ambedkar University (formerly Agra University), Agra, India.

The institute is situated within the heart of the city at University campus. The Institute of Social Sciences came into existence in 1955 and was headed by Prof. Desh Raj, Prof.B.P.Adhikari, Prof. D.D.Joshi (Later, Pro-Vice Chancellor, IGNOU, New Delhi) and Prof. V.K.Sethi. It has been approved by the Ministry of Human Resources Development, Government of India, the U.P. Government. Prof Diwakar Khare is the Director.

The institute has three departments:

- Department of Social Work
- Department of Statistics
- Department of Sociology
