= Coulomb scattering state =

A Coulomb scattering state in quantum mechanics (a fundamental theory in physics), describes a state of a particle where the particle is subject to Coulomb potential and is not localized to a finite region of space.

In general, Coulomb scattering state is a state in Hilbert Space that corresponds to two or more particles with positive interaction energy (assuming it to be only due to Coulomb interaction), which means, the energy of the system is greater than total energy of each separate particles constituting the system therefore these particles are not bound. The energy spectrum of such scattering state is continuous unlike discrete spectrum of bound states in Coulomb Potential.

== Energy eigenvalues ==
The eigenvalues of energy corresponding to these states are positive, continuous and extend from zero to infinity. Each of these eigenvalues are infinitely degenerate. The corresponding wave functions of scattering states in the Coulomb potential field are the Coulomb wave function.

The mathematical treatment of such states, being long range potential fields, differ from other short range potentials (for example Yukawa Potential).
