= Mien-Chie Hung =

Taiwanese-American cancer researcher (born 1950)

- 洪明奇
- Born: September 4, 1950 (age 75); Kaohsiung, Taiwan
- Education: National Taiwan University (BS, MS); Brandeis University (PhD)
- Scientific career
- Fields: Molecular cell biology
- Workplaces: Massachusetts Institute of Technology; MD Anderson Cancer Center; Academia Sinica (Taiwan); Center for Molecular Medicine, China Medical University Hospital; President, China Medical University
- Thesis: Structural and functional analysis of yolk protein genes from Drosophila melanogaster (1984)

Mien-Chie Hung (Chinese: 洪明奇; born September 4, 1950) is a Taiwanese-American molecular biologist and cancer researcher. He was formerly a professor and chair of the Department of Molecular and Cellular Oncology, The University of Texas MD Anderson Cancer Center in Houston, Texas. He currently serves as the president of China Medical University in Taichung, Taiwan.

== Education and career ==
Hung received his bachelor's and master's degrees in chemistry and biochemistry from National Taiwan University in Taipei, Taiwan. In 1983, Hung earned his PhD degree in biochemistry from Brandeis University, in the United States. In 1984, he worked at the Massachusetts Institute of Technology under the supervision of Robert A. Weinberg.

Hung joined the MD Anderson Cancer Center in 1986, and held the Hubert L. and Olive Stringer Endowed Professorship from 1996 to 2000, when he was named director of the Breast Cancer Basic Research Program and the Ruth Legett Jones Distinguished Chair.

In 2006, Hung became the honorary director of Center for Molecular Medicine of China Medical University Hospital and a distinguished professor.

In February 2019, Hung retired from MD Anderson to became the president of China Medical University, Taichung, Taiwan.

He is a fellow of The World Academy of Sciences, and was elected as a member of the Taiwan's Academia Sinica in 2002.
