= Asia University (Taiwan) =

University in Taichung, Taiwan

- 亞洲大學
- Former names: Taichung Health and Management College (2001–2005)
- Motto: 健康 · 關懷 · 創新 · 卓越
- Motto in English: Health, Care, Innovation, Excellence
- Type: Private university
- Established: 2001
- President: Jing-Pha Tsai
- Students: 12,196
- Location: Taichung, Taiwan; 24.046°N 120.687°E
- Campus: Suburban
- Website: asia.edu.tw

Asia University
- Traditional Chinese: 亞洲大學
- Simplified Chinese: 亚洲大学
Transcriptions
Standard Mandarin
- Hanyu Pinyin: Yàzhōu Dàxué
Southern Min
- Hokkien POJ: A-chiu Tāi-ha̍k
- Tâi-lô: A-tsiu Tāi-ha̍k

Former name: Taichung Health and Management College
- Traditional Chinese: 臺中健康暨管理學院
Transcriptions
Southern Min
- Hokkien POJ: Tâi-tiong Kiān-khong Kì Koán-lí Ha̍k-īⁿ
- Tâi-lô: Tâi-tiong Kiān-khong Kì Kuán-lí Ha̍k-īnn

Asia University (AU; Chinese: 亞洲大學; Pe̍h-ōe-jī: A-chiu Tāi-ha̍k) (Note: Formerly Taichung Health and Management College (Chinese: 臺中健康暨管理學院; Pe̍h-ōe-jī: Tâi-tiong Kiān-khong Kì Koán-lí Ha̍k-īⁿ)) is a private university in Taichung, Taiwan. Founded in 2001, it offers degrees in health and medical science, computer science and electrical engineering, creative design, management, and humanities and social sciences.

The university was founded with the goal of becoming an internationally competitive comprehensive university, and has been growing quickly since its creation. Specifically, being essentially a college with 17 departments and only about 2000 students when established in 2001, it has become a medium-size university with 28 departments and more than 12,000 students in 2018.

== History ==
Asia University (AU), initially with the name of Taichung Healthcare and Management College, was founded in August 2001 in Wufeng, Taichung,(Taiwan) by Chang-Hai Tsai and Tseng-lien Lin. On August 1, 2005, Taichung Healthcare and Management University was renamed "Asia University" under the authority of the Ministry of Education.

University rankings

Global – Overall
- QS World: 711-720 (2026)

== Faculties ==
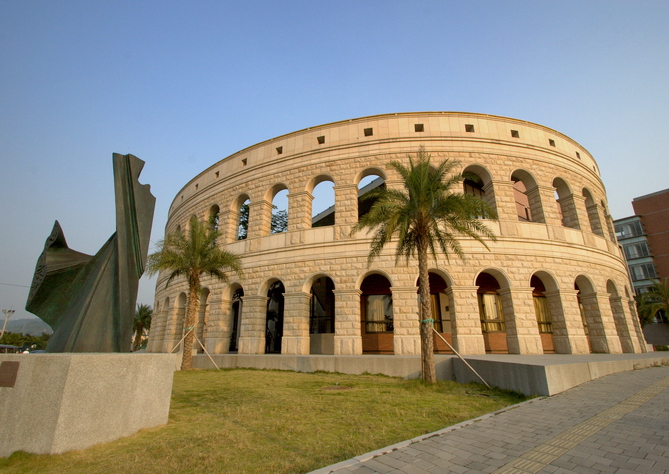
Asia University Gymnasium

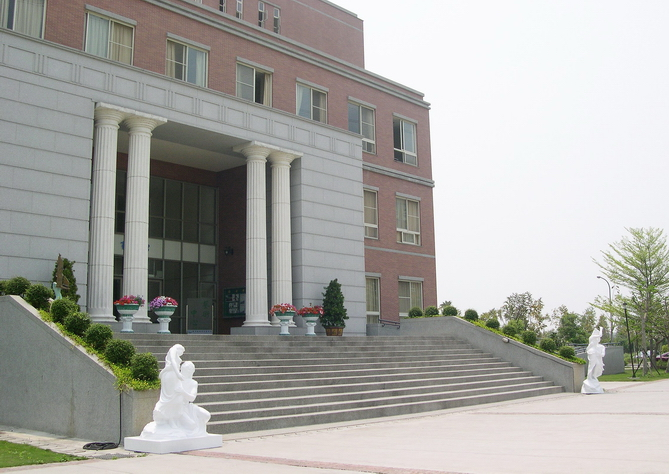
Medical and Health Science Building

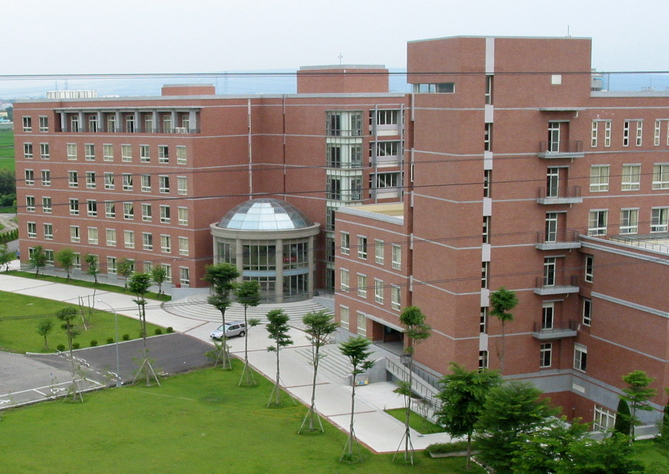
Information Science & Electrical Eng. Building

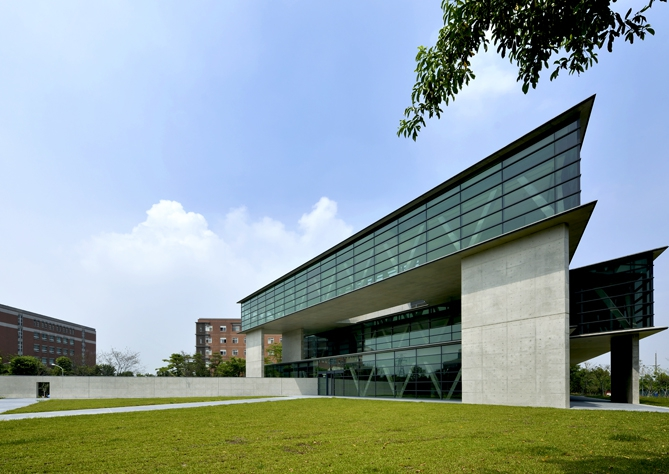
Asia University Museum of Modern Art

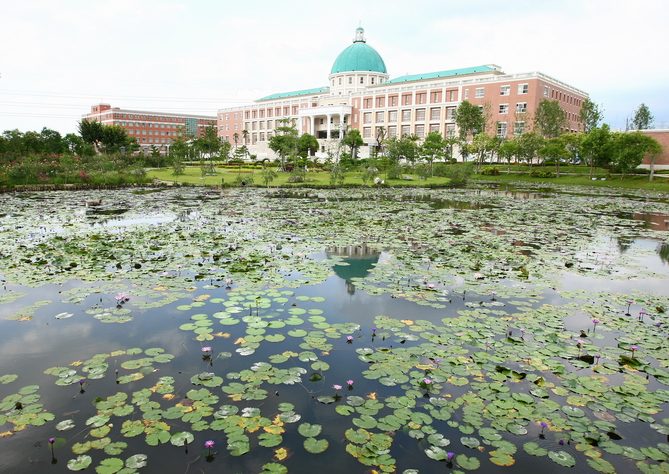
Taiji Lake in University Campus

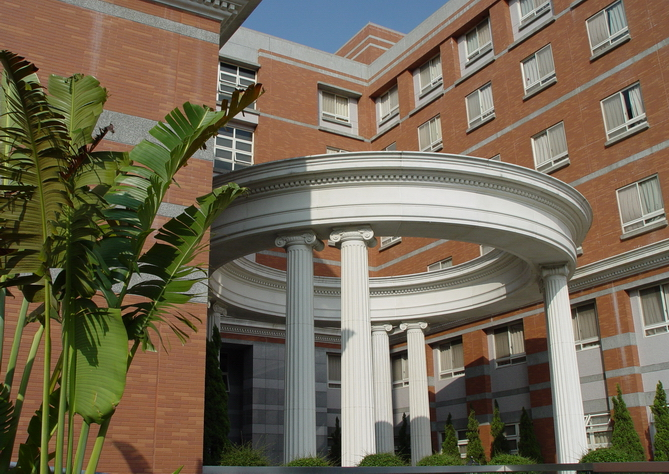
The 2nd Dormitory

- College of Medical and Health Science
  - Department of Healthcare Administration
  - Department of Food Nutrition and Health Biotechnology
  - Department of Biotechnology
  - Department of Psychology
  - Department of Nursing
  - Department of Optometry
  - Department of Audiology and Speech Pathology
  - Department of Occupational Therapy
  - Department of Physical Therapy
  - Department of Post-Baccalaureate Veterinary Medicine
- College of Information and Electrical Engineering
  - Department of Bioinformatics and Medical Engineering
  - Department of Computer Science & Information Engineering
  - Department of M-Commerce and Multimedia Applications
  - Department of Photonics and Communication Engineering
  - Department of Information Communication
- College of Management
  - Department of Business Administration
  - Department of International Business
  - Department of Leisure and Recreation Management
  - Department of Accounting and Information Systems
  - Department of Finance
  - Department of Financial and Economic Law
- College of Humanities and Social Sciences
  - Department of Foreign Languages and Literature
  - Department of Social Work
  - Department of Early Childhood Education
- College of Creative Design
  - Department of Digital Media Design
  - Department of Visual Communication Design
  - Department of Creative Product Design
  - Department of Fashion Design
  - Department of Interior Design
  - International Degree Program of Design
  - Creative Design and Invention Center
- College of Nursing
  - Department of Nursing
  - Post-Baccalaureate Program in Nursing
- College of Artificial Intelligence
  - Center for Artificial Intelligence
- International College
  - Center for Creative Leadership
  - Center for International Academic Exchange
  - Chinese Language Center
  - Center for the Development of Language Teaching and Research

== Partner institutions ==
=== Americas ===
==== United States ====
- Case Western Reserve University
- Georgia Institute of Technology
- Tulane University
- Stanford University
- University of California, Berkeley
- University of California, Irvine
- University of South Carolina
- University of Texas, Austin

==== Canada ====
- University of Victoria

==== Brazil ====
- Universidade Catolica de Brasilia

=== Malaysia ===
- Universiti Tunku Abdul Rahman

== Rankings ==
AU has been ranked to be one of the best universities in the world or in Asia by four famous global university rankings: (1) THE: UK Times Higher Education World University Rankings; (2) ARWU: Academic Ranking of World Universities (originally by Shanghai Jiao Tong University); (3) US News: US News & World Report Global University Ranking; (4) QS - Asia: UK QS Global University Rankings in Asia.

== See also ==
- List of universities in Taiwan
