= Taj corridor case =

Alleged scam

The Taj Heritage Corridor case is an alleged scam wherein 2002–2003, the then Chief Minister of Uttar Pradesh Mayawati and a minister in her government, Nasimuddin Siddiqui, were charged with corruption. The Taj Corridor project was intended to upgrade tourist facilities near the Taj Mahal and was to be implemented during her tenure as Chief Minister. The then BJP government at the Centre gave the Environmental Clearance required for the project near Taj Mahal. However, later on the BJP backed out and then started saying that the project was not cleared by the Environment Ministry and blamed Mayawati for starting construction work near the Taj Mahal.

== Cost and funding ==
The total estimated cost of the project was Rs. 1.75 billion (US$44 million).

== Political support ==
The project was started with the support of the BJP and interrupted when Mayawati Bahujan Samaj Party misaligned itself with that party on 25 August 2003. Commentators said that this change in alignment was due to Mayawati's quickly-changing temperament and because of the BJP's hostility toward the Taj Heritage Corridor project. A political commentator said that the support for the Corridor project came when Mayawati protected BJP leaders L.K. Advani, Murli Manohar Joshi and Uma Bharti from prosecution in the case of the demolition of the Babri Masjid by moving the trial of all charges except the conspiracy charge to a court in Rae Bareilly.

== Investigation ==
It has been alleged that Mayawati embezzled the money dedicated for this project. The case is currently under investigation by the Central Bureau of Investigation. Initially, the case saw some rapid progress, when CBI conducted extensive searches on her various addresses, and claimed that though she had claimed income of only Rs. 11 million during her tenure as CM, her bank balance in a single bank went up to 25 million and total assets held by her were estimated at Rs. 150 million. At one point a warrant was expected for her arrest, but she was granted a stay.

In September 2003 Ajay Agarwal, the former government counsel in the project, began accusing Mayawati of enriching herself from the Corridor project and also stated that Mayawati had recently acquired property both in her name and in the care of her relatives.

However, since late 2003, investigations appear to have slowed down; there are speculations in the media about political interference, and the Supreme Court of India has several times pulled up the CBI for its tardy progress in the case. Media sources reported that various officials who had been investigating the case were transferred to other duties. In June 2007, Uttar Pradesh Governor T. V. Rajeswar refused sanction to prosecute citing that there was insufficient evidence to prosecute Mayawati and other accused. In his 23-page order, he said: "the fact that the Mission Management Board, consisting of officers of both the State and the Central Government, regularly met and discussed the project and the fact that even a sum of ₹170 million (US$2.0 million) was spent through the Central Government public sector undertaking, NPCC, all go to show that the serious offences with which Mayawati and the Minister were charged do not stand scrutiny." The Supreme Court rejected the plea of the CBI and refused to direct the Governor to prosecute her. On 5 November 2012, Lucknow bench of Allahabad High Court upheld trial court's order to close the case for want of sanction to prosecute. It was thought that the case was effectively ended before going to trial. However, on 28 January 2013, a Supreme Court bench consisting of Justice H.L. Dattu and Ranjan Gogoi agreed to examine the case and asked the relevant parties to file their response.

=== Disproportionate assets case ===
On 6 July 2012, a Supreme Court bench consisting of Justice P. Sathasivam and Justice Dipak Misra quashed the FIR and all investigations conducted by the CBI in a Disproportionate assets case against Mayawati. The bench found irregularities in filing the case by CBI. Although the CBI decided not to appeal against this judgement, a person named Kamlesh Verma appealed against the judgement through review petition which is currently pending.

== Project status ==
The project is now defunct, and plans are being made to remove the partial construction near the Taj Mahal site and replace it with a low tech forested greenbelt. The High Court of Allahabad has ruled in favour of a 45–500 million project but exactly who will foot the ASI bill remains to be clear.
