= Edward Y. Chang =

American computer scientist

- 張智威
- Born: Taipei, Taiwan
- Occupations: Computer scientist, academic, and author
- Awards: Fellow of ACM & IEEE

Academic background
- Education: PhD, Stanford University
- Alma mater: Stanford University; University of California, Berkeley

Academic work
- Institutions: Stanford University
- Website: https://eyuchang.github.io/

Edward Y. Chang is a computer scientist, academic, and author. He is an adjunct professor of Computer Science at Stanford University, and visiting chair professor of Bioinformatics and Medical Engineering at Asia University, since 2019.

Chang is the author of seven books, including Unlocking the Wisdom of Large Language Models (2024), Multi-LLM Agent Collaborative Intelligence：The Path to Artificial General Intelligence (2024), Foundations of Large-Scale Multimedia Information Management and Retrieval, Big Data Analytics for Large-Scale Multimedia Search, Journey of the Mind (poetry), Nomadic Eternity (poetry), and the Mandarin translation of Erwin Schrödinger's What is Life? Mind and Matter. His research interests span consciousness modeling, generative artificial intelligence, and health care, for which he has received numerous awards such as the Google Innovation Award, XPRIZE Award, and the Presidential Award of Taiwan for his work containing the COVID-19 outbreak. He is also a fellow of ACM Association for Computing Machinery and fellow of IEEE Institute of Electrical and Electronics Engineers for his contributions to scalable machine learning and healthcare.

== Education ==
Chang completed his Master of Science in Industrial Engineering and Operations Research at the University of California, Berkeley before pursuing further studies at Stanford University. He received his Master of Science in Computer Science in 1994 and Ph.D. in Electrical Engineering in 1999 both from Stanford University, where he was advised by Hector Garcia-Molina. Beyond his technical education, he enrolled in more than ten courses in philosophy and literature, an intellectual breadth reflected in his publications.

== Career ==
=== Academia ===
Chang started his academic career at the University of California, Santa Barbara where he served as an Assistant, Associate, and eventually Full Professor of Electrical & Computer Engineering from 1999 to 2006. Between 2012 and 2015, he was appointed as an adjunct professor in Computer & Information Science at Hong Kong University of Science and Technology (HKUST), Hong Kong. This was followed by an appointment as a visiting professor at the Future Reality center in the EECS department of University of California, Berkeley from 2017 to 2020. Since 2019, he has been holding appointments as the adjunct professor of Computer Science at Stanford University and Visiting Chair Professor of Bioinformatics and Medical Engineering at Asia University.

=== Industry ===
Chang was Director of Research at Google from 2006 to 2012. During this time, he led research and development initiatives in several areas, including Web-scale image annotation (2008), data-centric scalable machine learning (2005-2012), recommendation systems, indoor localization, and Google QA. From 2012 to 2020, he served as the President of HTC Healthcare. Chang served as the Chief NLP Advisor at SmartNews, a Tokyo-based company, between 2019 and 2022, where he contributed in developing interactive news.

== Research ==
=== Multi-LLM agent collaborative intelligence for advancing to AGI ===
In 2019, Chang began exploring consciousness modeling, with the goal of enhancing AI reasoning capabilities. In 2023, his work applied the Socratic method to AI, fostering critical reading and thinking. He then introduced SocraSynth (Socratic Synthesis), a framework that convenes multiple Large Language Models (LLMs) in a collaborative and adversarial dialogue. Chang's 2024 book Multi-LLM Agent Collaborative Intelligence: The Path to Artificial General Intelligence depicts the supporting principles in statistics and information theory, and presents successful deployments in various application domains.

=== Web-scale image annotation and data-centric parallelizing machine learning ===
Chang began a data-centric approach to machine learning as early as 2005. From 2006 to 2012, he led teams at Google dedicated to this endeavor. In 2007–2008, his team initiated large-scale data annotation of Google's image repositories, and subsequently championed the sponsorship of the Stanford ImageNet project with a substantial Google grant.

To process these large-scale data, Chang's team in 2007 started implementing and open-sourcing parallel versions of five widely used machine-learning algorithms that could handle large datasets: PSVM for Support Vector Machines, PFP for Frequent Itemset Mining, PLDA for Latent Dirichlet Allocation, PSC for Spectral Clustering, and SPeeDO for Parallel Convolutional Neural Networks. Through his research on PSVM, he demonstrated that matrix factorization can be used to distribute the solver of the Interior Point Method across multiple machines, while utilizing a row-based Incomplete Cholesky Factorization to decrease both memory and computation requirements. This approach allows PSVM to effectively reduce memory needs from O(n^2) to O(n) and computational complexity from O(n^3) to O(n) for each of the square-root(n) parallel computation units (CPUs/GPUs), when working with n training instances. In addition, one of his papers, culminating from the research conducted at University of California at Santa Barbara proposed a content-based soft annotation (CBSA) procedure that improves image labeling accuracy by employing an ensemble of binary classifiers and comparing the performance of SVMs and BPMs. While addressing the imbalanced training-data problems in emerging applications such as image retrieval, video surveillance with G Wu, he proposed a class-boundary-alignment algorithm, and also proposed a kernel-boundary-alignment algorithm for SVM-based supervised learning tasks, demonstrating its effectiveness through theoretical analysis and empirical studies. Later in related research, he proved that DeepWalk is equivalent to matrix factorization, and introduced Text-Associated DeepWalk, a method that incorporates text features into network representation learning and outperforms other baselines on multi-class classification tasks, particularly in noisy networks with a small training ratio.

=== Improving training data effectiveness via active learning ===
Chang's research has contributed to the field of machine learning with a particular focus on active learning by improving the effectiveness of training data and providing insights for the development of more efficient healthcare technologies. His SVMActive work with Simon Tong addressed the shortage of labeled data available for classifier training in applications such as the healthcare sector by utilizing active learning to identify ambiguous unlabeled instances and query experts, such as physicians, to provide labels, thus maximizing information gain. Initially, this approach was employed to enhance relevance feedback in image-query refinement. In the healthcare sector, he particularly integrated sparse-space active learning with reinforcement learning to enable a doctor-agent to decide on the next symptom query for a patient, optimizing diagnostic accuracy with minimal symptom-probing iterations. Moreover, along with a group of researchers, he proposed the REFUEL algorithm which addresses the challenge of sparse symptoms in disease diagnosis using reward shaping and feature rebuilding strategies to guide the symptom-space search and eliminate correlated symptoms iteratively. REFUEL has also been implemented for remote diagnosis and triage by two hospital chains in Taiwan and by Taiwan CDC in the fight against COVID-19.

Chang and his team developed a mobile device powered by the REFUEL system, which could diagnose twelve common diseases by performing various laboratory tests. His joint paper published in 2017, provided a detailed account of the design of the DeepQ AI-powered symptom checker's key components, such as the optical sense and vital sense modules. These modules were integrated into a mobile device that was designed to offer a user-friendly experience. This work on symptom checker was also recognized in 2017 when the device won second prize in the Qualcomm Tricorder XPRIZE competition. Additionally, his chatbot-based symptom-checking system, developed in collaboration with Taiwan CDC, received the Presidential Award in 2020 for effectively containing the COVID-19 outbreak. Some of his other contributions to the healthcare technology field include the development and annotation of the DeepQ Arrhythmia Database. This database provides a collection of ECG recordings from patients engaged in various activities, complementing the MIT BIH Arrhythmia Database. The DeepQ Arrhythmia Database facilitates machine learning studies while addressing the issue of interpatient variability.

=== Other contributions ===
In 1997, he designed the Digital video recorder (DVR), which was developed in 1998 as a chapter of his PhD dissertation under the supervision of Hector Garcia-Molina and Pat Hanrahan.

== Awards and honors ==
- 2002 – National Science Foundation, Career Award
- 2009 – Innovation Award (launched Google Q&A to 60+ countries), Google
- 2015 – Best Technical Demonstration (360 panorama), ACM Multimedia Conference
- 2017 – Fellow, IEEE
- 2017 – Tricorder XPrize (AI-powered medical IoTs) US$1M winner, X PRIZE Foundation
- 2020 – Presidential Award (launched CDC AI chatbot 疾管家), Taiwan
- 2020 – ACM SIGMM Test of Time Honor, for paper “SVMActive: Support Vector Machine Active Learning for Image Retrieval”, ACM Multimedia, 2001
- 2021 – Fellow, ACM

== Bibliography ==
=== Books ===
- Foundations of Large-Scale Multimedia Information Management and Retrieval (2011) ISBN 978-3642204289
- Nomadic Eternity (Poetry) (2012)
- Big Data Analytics for Large-Scale Multimedia Search (2019) ISBN 978-1119376972
- What is Life? Matter and Mind (Erwin Schrödinger, 1944), English to Chinese Translation (2021)
- Journey of the Mind (Poetry) (2023) ISBN 978-1-962463-00-3
- Multi-LLM Agent Collaborative Intelligence：The Path to Artificial General Intelligence (2024) ISBN 979-8-344753-42-3
- Unlocking the Wisdom of Large Language Models: An Introduction to The Path to Artificial General (2024) ISBN 978-1-962463-09-6

=== Selected articles ===
- Tong, S., & Chang, E. Y. (2001, October). Support vector machine active learning for image retrieval. In Proceedings of the ninth ACM international conference on Multimedia (pp. 107–118).
- Chang, E. Y., Goh, K., Sychay, G., & Wu, G. (2003). CBSA: content-based soft annotation for multimodal image retrieval using Bayes point machines. In IEEE Transactions on Circuits and Systems for Video Technology, 13(1), 26–38.
- Wu, G., & Chang, E. Y. (2003, August). Class-boundary alignment for imbalanced dataset learning. In ICML 2003 workshop on learning from imbalanced data sets II, Washington, DC (pp. 49–56).
- Li, H., Wang, Y., Zhang, D., Zhang, M., & Chang, E. Y. (2008, October). PFP: parallel fp-growth for query recommendation. In Proceedings of the 2008 ACM conference on Recommender systems (pp. 107–114).
- Chang E. Y., Zhu Kaihua, Wang Hao, Bai Hongjie, Li Jian, Qiu Zhihuan, & Cui Hang (2008). Parallel Support Vector Machines on Distributed Computers. In Advances in Neural Information Processing Systems (NeurIPS), 16–23.
- Chen, W. Y., Song, Y., Bai, H., Lin, C. J., & Chang, E. Y. (2010). Parallel spectral clustering in distributed systems. In IEEE transactions on pattern analysis and machine intelligence, 33(3), 568–586.
- Chang, E. Y., Wu, M. H., Tang, K. F., Kao, H. C. Kao, Chou, C. N. (2017 October). Artificial intelligence in XPRIZE DeepQ tricorder. In Proceedings of the 2nd international workshop on multimedia for personal health and health care.
- Peng, Y. S., Tang, K. T., Lin, H. T., Chang, E. Y. (2018). Refuel: Exploring sparse features in deep reinforcement learning for fast disease diagnosis. In Advances in Neural Information Processing Systems (NeurIPS).
- Chang, E. Y. (2023 March). Prompting Large Language Models With the Socratic Method. In IEEE 13th Annual Computing and Communication Workshop and Conference (CCWC), 351–360.
- Chang, E. Y. (2023 March). CoCoMo: Computational Consciousness Modeling for Generative and Ethical AI. arXiv:2304.02438.
- Chang, E. Y. (2023 July). Examining GPT-4's Capabilities and Enhancement by SocraSynth.
