= E-stamping =

Computer application for payment

e-Stamping is a computer-based application and a secured way of paying non-judicial stamp duty to the government. e-Stamping is currently operational in the states of Odisha, Haryana, Gujarat, Karnataka, NCR Delhi, Bihar, Assam, Tamil Nadu, Rajasthan, Himachal Pradesh, Andhra Pradesh, Uttarakhand, and the union territories of Dadra & Nagar Haveli, Daman & Diu Puducherry, Jharkhand and Uttar Pradesh, West Bengal, Chhattisgarh. The wide network and focus on technology. SHCIL is the only Central Record Keeping Agency (CRA) appointed by the Government of India. The CRA is responsible for user registration, Imprest Balance Administration and overall E-Stamping application operations and maintenance. CRA will appoint ACCs who will issue certificates to the clients at their counters.

There are ACC authorized centers from respective state governments. In case of karnataka, commissioner of stamps issues license to co-operative and credit co-operative societies, who are authorized to sell e-stamps. There are various online e-commerce portals like VATA e-stamp and rental agreements which sell e-stamps online and deliver them at the door step for one or more states.

HP Printer 403dw is an authorized printer for E stamping.

== Benefits ==
- e-Stamp Certificate can be generated within minutes
- e-Stamp Certificate generated is tamper proof
- Authenticity of the e-Stamp certificate can be checked through the inquiry module
- e-Stamp Certificate generated has a Unique Identification Number
- Specific denomination is not required.
- e-stamp certificate can be checked by any person through recommended site
