= Defence Materials and Stores Research and Development Establishment =

Indian defense laboratory

Defence Materials and Stores Research and Development Establishment (DMSRDE)
- Established: 1929
- Field of research: High tech non-metallic materials
- Director: Dr Kingsuk Mukhopadhyay
- Location: GT Road (NH-2), Kanpur- 208 013, Kanpur, Uttar Pradesh, India
- Operating agency: Defence Research and Development Organisation, Ministry of Defence, Government of India
- Website: DMSRDM, DRDO

Defence Materials and Stores Research and Development Establishment (DMSRDE) is a laboratory of the Indian Defence Research and Development Organisation (DRDO) at Kanpur. It is responsible for the research and development of materials for the Indian military services, including various types of protective clothing and equipment.

== History ==
The Defence Materials & Stores Research & Development Establishment (DMSRDE) was formed by renaming the Inspectorate of General Stores in the Harness & Saddlery Factory in Cawnpore (present day Ordnance Equipment Factory, Kanpur) of the Ordnance Factory Board in 1929.

== Projects and products ==
DMSRDE had played important role in development of high tech non-metallic materials for the Indian Armed Forces.

DMSRDE has developed Nuclear Shielding Pad, Boot Anti Mine, Blast Protection Suit, Bullet Proof Jackets, etc.

"The Defence Material and Stores Research Development Establishment in Kanpur has developed a new NBC suit that would be proved effective against any kind of dangerous weapons or chemicals and protect soldiers from any sort of attack", DMSRDE Director Arvind Kumar Saxena was quoted by media-persons. 40,000 pieces of NBC suits costing about ₹30,000 had been requested by the Indian army. "The further progress on the other two suits are going on," further quoted by media-persons.

DMSRDE developed a new medium sized light weight 9 Kg bulletproof vest for the Indian Army in 2021 that can protect from hard steel bullet core in counter insurgency operation. The conforms to Bureau of Indian Standards (BIS) and validated by Terminal Ballistics Research Laboratory (TBRL).

In 2024, DMSRDE developed India's lightest bulletproof jacket.
