= Edward Chang (electrical engineer) =

Taiwanese electrical engineer

Edward Chang is a Taiwanese electrical engineer from National Chiao Tung University in Hsinchu, Taiwan.

Chang was named a Fellow of the Institute of Electrical and Electronics Engineers (IEEE) in 2017 for his contributions to compound semiconductor heterojunction transistor technologies.
