= Fujian University of Traditional Chinese Medicine =

University in Fuzhou, Fujian, China

Coordinates: 26.07333°N 119.18074°E

- 福建中医药大学
- Type: Public university
- Established: 1958
- Location: Fuzhou, Fujian, China
- Campus: Suburban
- Website: www.fjtcm.edu.cn

Fujian University of Traditional Chinese Medicine (FJUTCM; Chinese: 福建中医药大学; pinyin: Fújiàn Zhōngyī Xuéyuàn) is a university located in Fuzhou, Fujian, China.

== History and development ==
Founded in 1958, Fujian University of Traditional Chinese Medicine (FJUTCM) is a traditional Chinese medicine (TCM) university of higher learning in Fujian province. The university is situated in Fuzhou, the capital of Fujian Province. There are two campuses in the university with Pingshan campus in the city proper and Qishan campus in the suburb Minhou, covering an area of about 70 hectares in total.

In April 1989, the university admitted 13 students from Taiwan, becoming the first mainland university to accept application from the island.

Now the university confers bachelors', masters' and doctoral degree and serves as the base of TCM education, research and medical treatment in Fujian province. The number of staff both in the university and affiliated hospitals is more than 2400, and the total enrollment of full-time students is over 8000, including nearly 1000 postgraduates.

Fujian University of Traditional Chinese Medicine has become one of the best TCM universities in China.

== Structure ==
FJUTCM consists of nine departments and three colleges with fifteen specialties for undergraduates, three first class disciplines covering eighteen specialties for Master candidates and two specialties for Doctoral candidates. The university has established a comprehensive discipline system. TCM Orthopedics and Traumatology is not only one of the key disciplines of State Administration of Traditional Chinese Medicine but also the key discipline of "211 Project" of Fujian province. There are also seven provincial key disciplines, two research institutes in the university, namely Fujian Institute of Chinese Medicine and Academy of Integrative Medicine, Fujian, China.

FJUTCM has two affiliated hospitals, i.e. Fujian People's Hospital and Fujian Second People's Hospital, and six indirectly affiliated hospitals. There are seven Ministry—level key disciplines of State Administration of Traditional Chinese Medicine, twelve provincial—level key disciplines in Fujian People's Hospital and Fujian Second People's Hospital. FJUTCM also set up Guoyitang Clinic in Pingshan campus to provide medical service to the public.

== See also ==
- List of universities in PRC
