= Cancer Letters =

Oncology journal

- Discipline: Oncology
- Language: English
- Edited by: M. Schwab

Publication details
- History: 1975-present
- Publisher: Elsevier
- Frequency: 28/year
- Impact factor: 10.1 (2024)

Standard abbreviations
- ISO 4: Cancer Lett.

Indexing
- CODEN: CALEDQ
- ISSN: 0304-3835 (print); 1872-7980 (web)
- LCCN: 77640685
- OCLC no.: 1874893

Links
- Journal homepage; Online access

Cancer Letters is a peer-reviewed medical journal established in 1975 that focuses on the rapid publication of original research on multidisciplinary aspects of cancer. The editor-in-chief is M. Schwab.

== Abstracting and indexing ==
Cancer Letters is abstracted and indexed in BIOSIS, Chemical Abstracts, Current Contents/Life Sciences, EMBASE, MEDLINE, Oncology Information Service, PASCAL and FRANCIS, and Scopus.
