= Exosome =

Exosome may refer to:

- Exosome complex, an intracellular macromolecular protein complex involved in RNA degradation
- Exosome (vesicle), an extracellular vesicle released from the endosomal compartment of eukaryotic cells
