= Vakpati =

Vakpati (Sanskrit for "Lord of Speech") may refer to:

- Vakpati (8th century poet), author of the epic poem Gaudavaho
- Vakpati (Chandela dynasty), a 9th-century ruler from central India
- Vakpati Munja or Vakpati II, a 10th-century ruler from the Paramara dynasty of central India
- Vakpatiraja I, a 10th-century ruler from the Shakambhari Chahamana dynasty of north-western India
- Vakpatiraja II, an 11th-century ruler from the Shakambhari Chahamana dynasty of north-western India
