= Yashovarman II (Chandela dynasty) =

12th century Chandela ruler of Central India

Yashovarman

King of Jejakabhukti
- Reign: c. 1164-1165 CE
- Predecessor: Madanavarman
- Successor: Paramardi
- Dynasty: Chandela
- Father: Madanavarman

Yashovarman (IAST: Yaśovarman; reigned c. 1164-1165 CE), also called Yashovarman II to distinguish him from the earlier Yashovarman I, was a member of the Chandela dynasty of central India. He is believed to have ruled the Jejakabhukti region (Bundelkhand in present-day Madhya Pradesh and Uttar Pradesh) for a short period.

Yashovarman was a son of the Chandela king Madanavarman. He is mentioned in the Bateshvar inscription of his own son Paramardi-deva, but other Chandela inscriptions do not mention his name in the list of Chandela kings. According to historian S. K. Mitra, the Bateshvar inscription clearly indicates that Yashovarman ascended the Chandela throne, even if for a very short period. It describes Yashovarman as "an ornament of great rulers causing joy to the people". Mitra theorizes that the other inscriptions omit his name because his short reign did not see any notable achievement.

Historian R. K. Dikshit, on the other hand, believes that the epithet "ornament of great rulers" is mere rhetoric. There is hardly any difference between the last known date of Yashovarman's father Madanavarman (1063 CE) and the earliest known date of his son Paramardi-deva (1066 CE). The inscriptions other than the Bateshvar inscription, including those issued by Paramardi, suggest that Paramardi succeeded Madanvarman. It is possible that Yashovarman died while his father Madanvarman was still alive.

According to the medieval legendary text Paramala Raso, Paramardi ascended the Chandela throne at the age of 5 years, which suggests that Yashovarman died prematurely.
