= Balaharsha =

King of the Kalachuri dynasty of Tripuri in central India

Bala-harsha (IAST: Bālaharṣa, r. c. 910–915) was a king of the Kalachuri dynasty of Tripuri in central India. A son of his predecessor Shankara-gana II, he appears to have ruled for a short period.

== Background ==
Bala-harsha appears to be a royal epithet (biruda) rather than the king's personal name. He was a son of his predecessor Shankara-gana II. He is known only from the Varanasi inscription of Karna, which describes him as a nrpati ("Lord of men") and praises him using conventional phrases. Otherwise, not much is known about his reign.

== Reign ==
According to the 953-954 CE Khajuraho inscription of the Chandela dynasty, their king Yashovarman (r.c. 925–953) "brought distress on the shameful Chedis". The Chedi region was a part of the core Kalachuri territory, and some historians, such as S. K. Mitra, theorize that the inscription refers to Yashovarman's victory over Bala-harsha. Other historians identify the defeated ruler as one of Bala-harsha's successors, either Yuva-raja-deva I, or Lakshmana-raja II. Possibly, at this time, the Chandelas were allied with the Pratiharas while the Kalachuris were allied with the Rashtrakutas; the rivalry between the Pratiharas and the Rashtrakutas may have led to a conflict between the Chandelas and the Kalachuris.

Bala-harsha apperas to have ruled for a short period; historian R.K. Sharma assigns his reign to c. 910-915 CE. Likely, he died heirless, as he was succeeded by his younger brother Yuva-raja-deva I.
