= Vijjaka =

Vijjaka may refer to:

- Vijja, an 8th or 9th-century Sanskrit poet of India
  - Identified with Vijaya-Bhattarika, 7th-century regent, by some scholars
- Vijayashakti, a 9th-century ruler from the Chandela dynasty of India
