= Rahila =

Chandela king from 885 to 905

- Nṛpati ("Lord of men")

Chandela king
- Reign: c. 885-905 CE
- Predecessor: Vijayashakti
- Successor: Harsha
- Dynasty: Chandela
- Father: Vijayashakti

Rahila (IAST: Rāhila, reigned c. 885-905 CE) was a king of the Chandela dynasty of India. He ruled in the Jejakabhukti region (Bundelkhand in present-day Madhya Pradesh and Uttar Pradesh).

Rahila was the son of his predecessor Vijayashakti. R. K. Dikshit dates his reign approximately to 885-905 CE. In an inscription of one of his successors, his title is given as nṛpati ("Lord of men"). No royal titles have been assigned to him, which suggests that he was a subordinate to the Pratiharas, like other early Chandela rulers.

Not much is known about Rahila's military career. He is mentioned in two Khajuraho inscriptions of his successors. These eulogistic inscriptions praise him as a warrior, but do not provide much information of historical value. For example, the 954 CE Khajuraho inscription states that he gave enemies sleepless nights. Using analogies, it compares a battle to a ritual sacrifice, and states that Rahila was never tired of this sacrifice. The legendary text Paramala Raso, which is of doubtful authenticity, contains a highly exaggerated account of Rahila's military campaigns. For example, it claims that he invaded Rameshvara with a cavalry of 2 million horses, and confiscated a thousand ships from the king of Simhala.

== Historical description ==
Rahila is believed to have commissioned several public works. Inscriptions at an Ajaygadh temple bear his name. The Rahilya Sagar lake in Mahoba, which has a temple on its bank, is named after him. Paramala Raso states that he established the Rasina (or Rajavasini) township, which is identified with Rasin village near Badausa. This village has a Chandela-style temple.

According to Paramala Raso, Rahila's queen was Rājamatī. The Kalachuri king Kokkala I married a Chandela princess Naṭṭā-devi. According to R. C. Majumdar, this princess might have been a daughter of Rahila's uncle Jayashakti. However, R. K. Dikshit, believes that she was probably a daughter or sister of Rahila.
