= Kakadeo =

Coaching Hub of Uttar Pradesh

Coordinates: 26.478928°N 80.291111°E

Kakadeo is a locality in Kanpur, Uttar Pradesh, India. The area has historical significance and was once under the rule of the Chandela dynasty. In earlier times, Kakadeo was often referred to as a "village of temples" (Mandiron ka Gaav). Among the notable temples is the shrine of Kakadev Baba, after whom the locality is believed to be named.

In contemporary times, Kakadeo emerged as a major hub for coaching institutes preparing students for various competitive examinations. After Kota, Kakadeo is regarded as one of the largest centers for entrance exam coaching in India, particularly for engineering and medical streams. The area hosts numerous institutes offering preparation for exams such as IIT-JEE, NEET, UPSE, AIIMS, SSC, Banking exams, and others, including branches of prominent institutions like the Aakash Institute.
