= Nannuka =

Chandela king from 831 to 845

- Nṛpati, Mahipati

Chandela king
- Reign: c. 831–845
- Successor: Vakpati
- Dynasty: Chandela

Nannuka (reigned c. 831–845) was the founder of the Chandela dynasty of India. He ruled in the Jejakabhukti region (Bundelkhand in present-day Madhya Pradesh).

The poetic ballads about the Chandelas do not mention Nannuka at all, and instead name "Chandravarman" as the founder of the Chandela dynasty. However, Nannuka is mentioned as the dynasty's founder in two inscriptions found at Khajuraho, dated Vikrama Samvat 1011 (954 CE) and 1059 (1002 CE). These two inscriptions, eulogistic in nature, do not provide much information of historical value. The 954 CE inscription states that he had conquered many enemies, and that other princes feared and obeyed him. It also states that he was "shaped like the god of love", and "playfully decorated the faces of the women of the quarters with the sandal of his fame". The inscription also praises him using vague phrases, such as "a touchstone to test the worth of the gold of the regal order". The 1002 CE inscription describes him as the Sun and the pearl-jewel of his family. It compares his archery skills to that of the legendary hero Arjuna. It praises his modesty and generosity, and calls him the "delight of his subjects".

The epigraphic records do not mention the circumstances in which the Chandela kingdom was established. The titles given to Nannuka in the Chandela records include nṛpa, narpati and mahīpati. These are not very high titles, and therefore some modern historians believe that he was only a small feudatory ruler. According to the local tradition of Bundelkhand, the Chandelas became rulers of that region after subduing the Pratiharas. Historian R. K. Dikshit notes that, in absence of any historical evidence, it is hard to believe that Nannuka defeated the imperial Pratiharas. He could have overthrown a local branch of the Pratiharas.

Nannuka was succeeded by his son Vākpati.
