= Dhanga =

Chandela king from 953 to 999

- Kalanjaradhipati ("Lord of Kalanjara")

Chandela king
- Reign: c. 953-999 CE
- Predecessor: Yashovarman
- Successor: Ganda
- Issue: Ganda
Regnal name
- Dhangadeva
- Dynasty: Chandela
- Father: Yashovarman
- Mother: Pushpa (Puṣpā) Devī

Dhanga (r. c. 953–999), also known as Dhaṇga-deva in inscriptions, was a king of the Chandela dynasty of India. He ruled in the Jejakabhukti region (Bundelkhand in present-day Madhya Pradesh). Dhanga established the sovereignty of the Chandelas, who had served as vassals to the Pratiharas until his reign. He is also notable for having commissioned magnificent temples at Khajuraho, including the Vishvanatha temple.

== Early life ==
According to the Khajuraho Inscription No. IV, Dhanga was born to the Chandela king Yashovarman and his queen Puppā (Puṣpā) Devī. The earliest inscription set up during Dhanga's reign is the Chaturbhuj inscription of 953-954 CE (1011 VS). Dhanga must have ascended the throne sometime before this. His ascension was probably undisputed, as his brother Krishna had been deputed to protect the kingdom's Malwa frontier.

Other inscriptions from Dhanga's reign include the Nanaora (or Nanyaura) inscription (998 CE) and the Lalaji inscription at Khajuraho (dated variously as 999 CE or 1002 CE CE). His name also appears in the inscriptions of his descendants.

== Extent of the kingdom ==
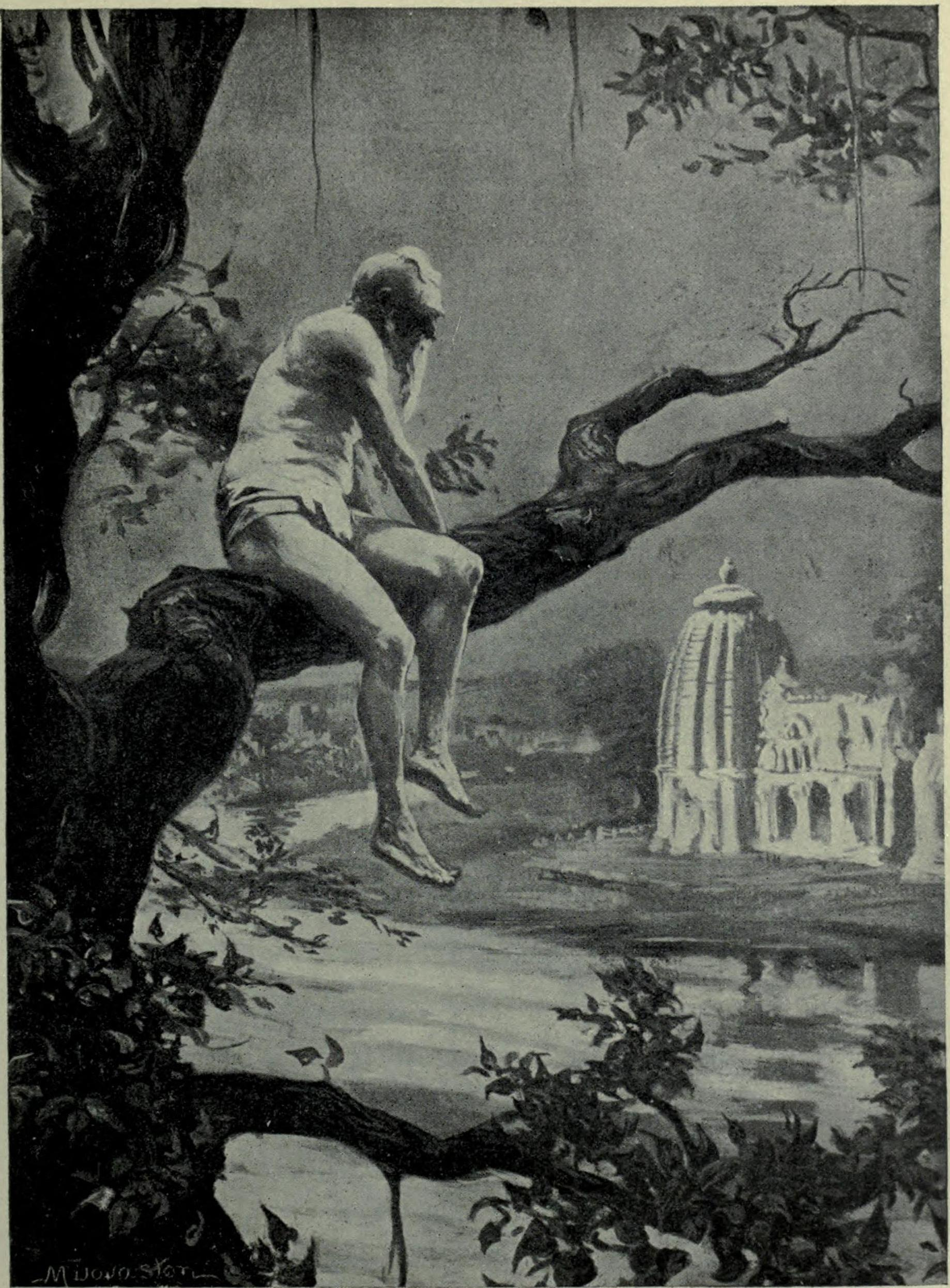
A 20th century artist's impression of Dhanga at the end of his reign, from Hutchinson's Story of the Nations

According to the 953-954 CE inscription, Dhanga's kingdom was bounded by the following areas:

- Kalanjara
- Bhasvat on the banks of Malava river (Bhilsa on Betwa)
- Kalindi River (Yamuna near its confluence with Ganga)
- Chedi region
- Gopa mountain (Gopadri or Gwalior)

The 998 CE (1055 VS) According to S. K. Mitra, the Nanyaura copper-plate grant, issued while he stayed at "Kashika" (Varanasi), indicates that the present-day Varanasi area was also under his control. However, V. A. Smith theorizes that the king may have been in Varanasi for a pilgrimage.

Dhanga styled himself as Kalanjaradhipati ("Lord of Kalanjara"), but he appears to have retained Khajuraho as the kingdom's capital.

== Military conquests ==
Dhanga's inscriptions do not mention the Pratiharas, who are acknowledged as the overlords of the Chandelas in the earlier inscriptions of the dynasty. This indicates that Dhanga established the Chandela sovereignty.

While Dhanga's inscription claims that the Gopa hill (modern Gwalior area) was part of his kingdom, a contemporary inscription at the Sas-Bahu Temple states that the Gopadri-durga ("Gopa hill fort" or Gwalior Fort) was in possession of the Kachchhapaghata family, having been conquered by Vajradaman. The Kachchhapaghatas were probably the vassals of the Chandelas at this time, and helped them defeat the Pratiharas. This theory is corroborated by the fact that the contemporary Muslim historians use the title Hakim (indicating a subordinate status) to describe the chief who defended the Gwalior fort against Mahmud of Ghazni. Besides, the Mau inscription claims that Dhanga defeated the ruler of Kannauj, who could have been a Pratihara ruler.

An inscription found at Mahoba states that Dhanga's arms equalled that of the "powerful Hamvira", who had become a "heavy burden for the earth". This probably refers to a Muslim ruler, "Hamvira" being a Sanskritized variant of the title Amir. The Ghaznavids had reached the north-western frontier of India by this time. E. Hultzsch identified Hamvira with Sabuktigin (c. 942–997), while Sisirkumar Mitra identified him with Sabuktigin's successor Mahmud. There is no historical record of a direct battle between the Ghaznavids and the Chandelas. Jayapala, the ruler of the Hindu Kabul Shahi dynasty, faced Ghaznavid invasions in late 10th century. The 16th-century historian Firishta mentions that several Hindu kings, including the Raja of Kalinjar, dispatched contingents to help Jayapala. The Raja of Kalinjar (Kalanjara) is identified with Dhanga.

The Khajuraho inscription claims that the rulers of Kosala, Kratha (part of Vidarbha region), Kuntala, and Simhala listened humbly to his officers' commands. It also claims that the wives of the kings of Andhra, Anga, Kanchi and Raḍha resided in his prisons as a result of his success in wars. These appear to be eulogistic exaggerations by a court poet, but suggest that Dhanga did undertake extensive military campaigns.

Dhanga's claims of military success in eastern India (Anga and Raḍha) may not be without basis. The Pala Empire had been declining after declarations of independence by the Kambojas and the Chandras. The king of Anga defeated by Dhanga might have been the weakened Pala ruler. The ruler of Raḍha might have been the Kamboja usurper of the Pala kingdom. Dhanga did not annex any new territory as part of this campaign: his objective was only to prevent the Kambojas from becoming a threat. Dhanga's invasion might have weakened the Kambojas, allowing the Pala ruler Mahipala to restore his imperial rule in Bengal.

Dhanga's boasts about successes in the south (Andhra, Kanchi, Kuntala and Simhala) appear to be poetic exaggerations. But, he might have raided some territories to the south of the Vindhyas. The ruler of Kosala (Dakshina Kosala or southern Kosala) might have been the Somavamshi king Mahabhavagupta Janamejaya at this time.

=== Krishna's conquests ===
Dhanga's younger brother Krishna (also Krishnapa or Kanhapa) was probably the governor of the south-western provinces of his kingdom. He may have been given the responsibility of overseeing the hostilities against the Paramaras of Malwa and the Kalachuris of Chedi.

Krishna's minister Kaundinya Vachaspati claimed to have achieved victory against a Chedi ruler. It appears that Dhanga had appointed Krishna to oversee the Chandela operations against the Kalachuris of Chedi. The Chedi king defeated by Kaundinya may have been Shankaragana III. Narasimha of Sulki dynasty might have aided the Chandelas in this war: his Maser inscription claims that he turned the Kalachuri queens into widows at Krishna-raja's command.

Kaundinya also claimed to have killed a Sabara chief called Simha, who might have been a small feudatory chief or a Chedi general. His Bhilsa inscription also states that he placed the chiefs of Rālā mandala (division) and Rodapādi on their thrones. The identification of Rālā is uncertain, although one conjecture identifies it with Lāṭa (part of present-day Gujarat). Rodapādi was probably located somewhere on the eastern frontier of the Paramara kingdom.

== Administration ==
Dhanga's chief minister was a Brahmin named Prabhasa, who had been appointed after being tested by the standards mentioned in the Arthashastra. His royal priest was Yashodhara.

== Religion ==
Dhanga was a Shaivite. A Khajuraho inscription states that he installed two lingas at a Shiva temple: one of emerald and one of ordinary stone. This temple is identified as the Vishvanatha Temple.

He respected other faiths too. He completed the Vaikuntha-natha Vishnu temple commissioned by his father. A contemporary inscription records the grant of some gardens to a Jain (Jinanatha) temple by one Pahilla, who was respected by Dhanga.

According to the Nanyaura inscription, Dhanga used to make regular gifts on occasions such as a solar eclipse, believing it to be meritorious for him and his deceased parents. The king also performed the prestigious and expensive Tulapurusha gift-giving ceremony.

Shrines dated to Dhanga's reign
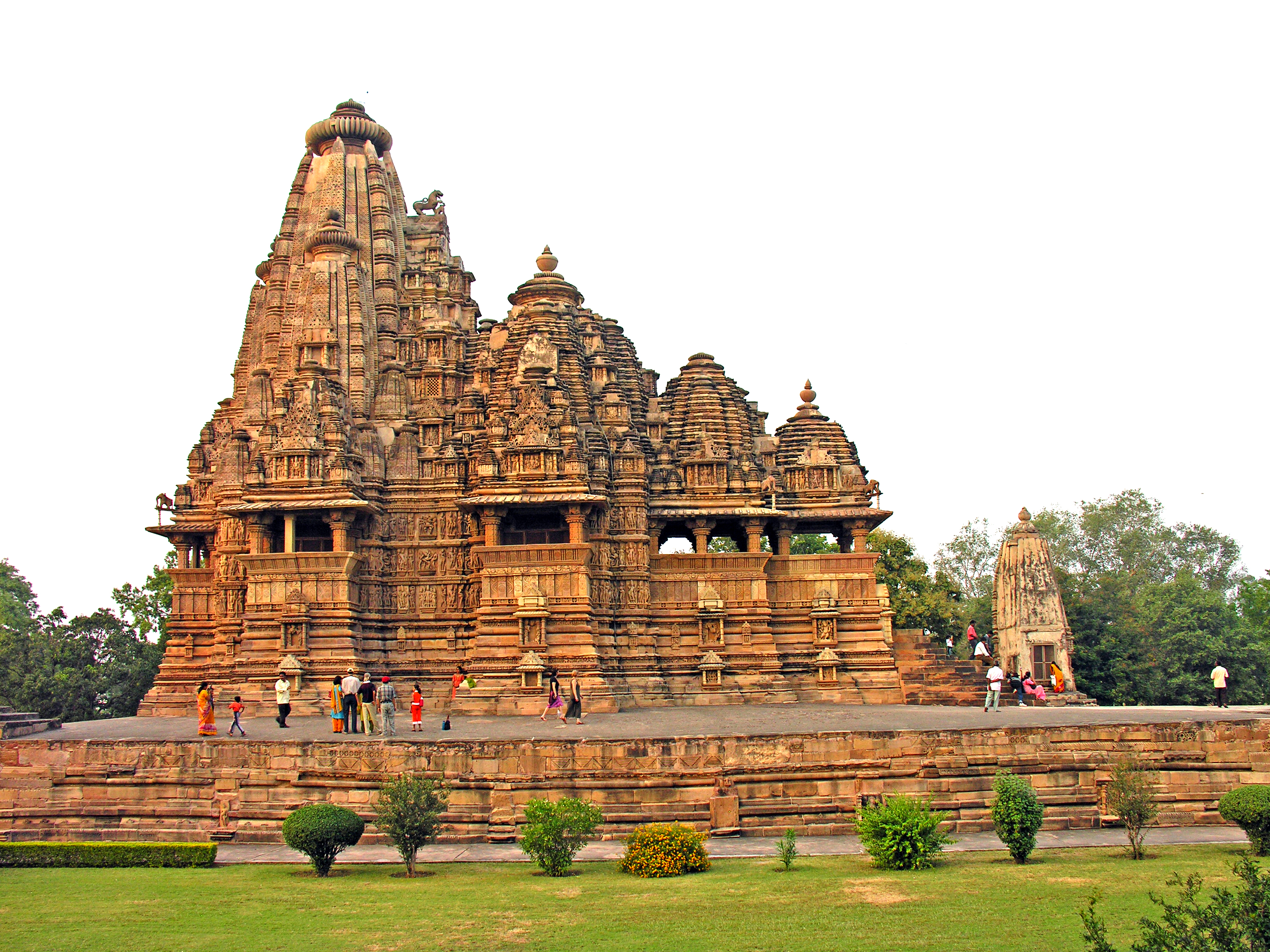
Vishvanatha Temple, a Shiva shrine commissioned by Dhanga

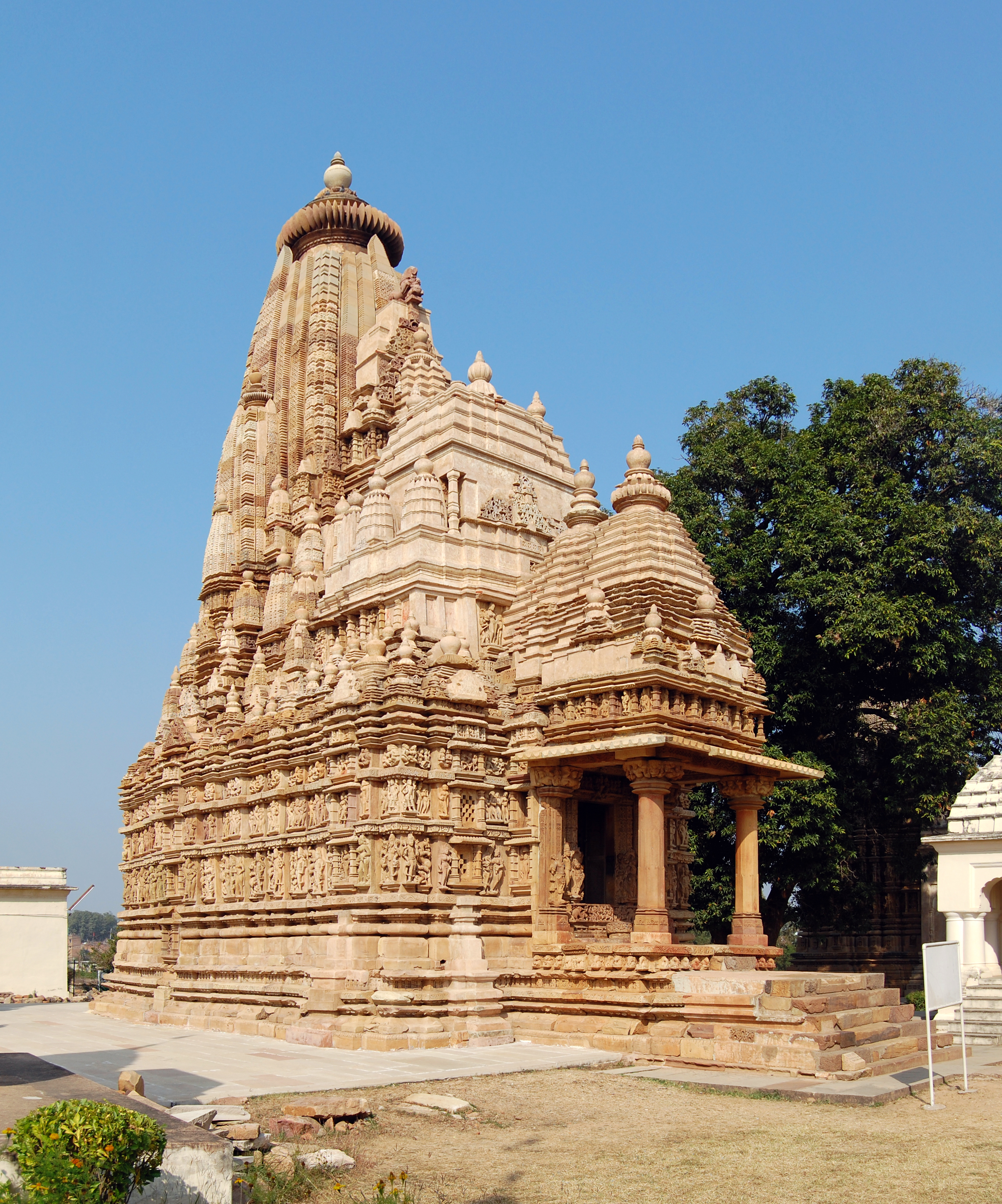
Parshvanatha temple (Jinanatha temple), a Jain shrine built by a Jain family

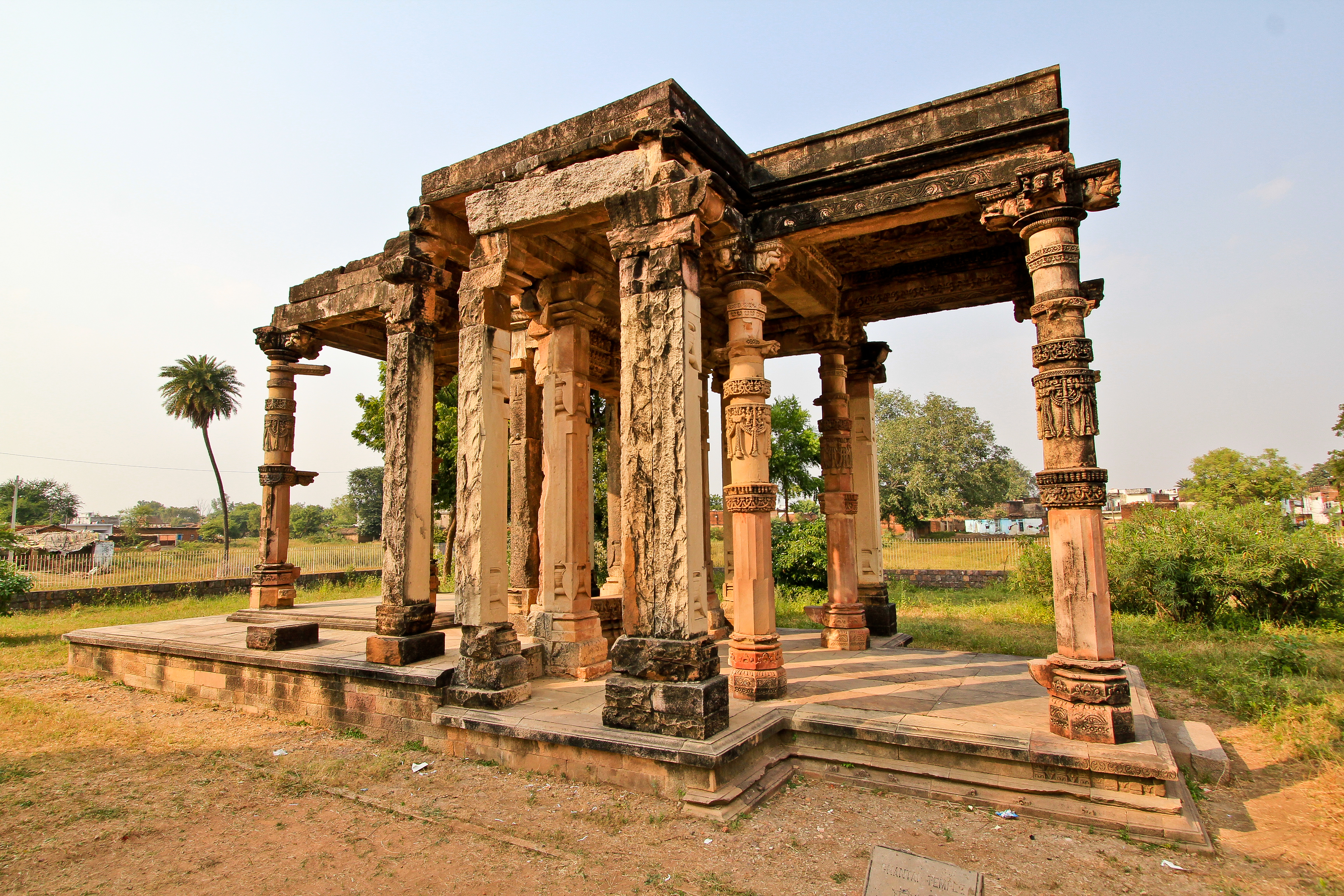
Ghantai temple, a now-ruined Jain shrine constructed sometime after the Parshvnatha temple

== Last days ==
According to the Khajuraho inscription, after living for more than a hundred autumns, Dhanga attained moksha by abandoning his body in the waters of Ganga and Yamuna. Some scholars have interpreted this as suicide, but according to Rajendralal Mitra, this was a conventional way of announcing a person's death.

Dhanga was succeeded by his son Ganda-deva. S. K. Sullerey (2004) dates the end of his reign to 999 CE. R. K. Dikshit (1976) dated the end of his reign to 1002 CE.
