= Chandel (Rajput clan) =

Clan in northern India

Chandel or Chandela is a Rajput clan from India. Families belonging to this clan ruled several kingdoms in north India and held various feudal estates. The most notable of these were the Chandelas of Jejakabhukti, who ruled the Bundelkhand region.

== History ==
During 10th to 13th century CE, the Chandelas of Jejakabhukti ruled the Bundelkhand region in present-day Madhya Pradesh and Uttar Pradesh. Chandel claim Chandravansh lineage, Historian R. K. Dikshit does find the Bhar and Gond origin theory convincing: he argues that Maniya was not a tribal deity. According to him, the dynasty's association with Gond territory is not necessarily indicative of a common descent: the dynasty's progenitor may have been posted as a governor in these territories. Historian Romila Thapar states that although the Chandella dynasty claimed a mythological Lunar(Chandravansh) descent but the origin of the Chandella dynasty was also, "associated with the Gond tribe of central India". It is stated that the dynasty rulers originally worshipped a rock named 'Maniya Deo', that they installed in Mahoba, their first capital. They gave up worshipping the rock and started worshipping deities of the Puranas to form the Rajput Chandella dynasty. Thapar cites this example as one of the many instances where building of Temples was used for mobility in the caste system.

=== Gidhaur zamindari ===
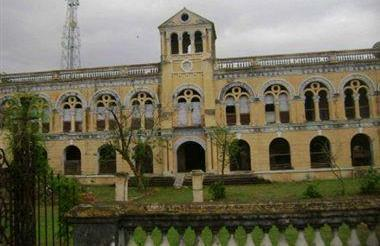
Gidhaur palace

The zamindari estate of Gidhaur in Munger district, present-day Bihar was controlled by a branch of the Chandel They are considered to be one of the oldest ruling families in Bihar. It was established by Bir Bikram Shah whose ancestors came from Mahoba in Bundelkhand but were driven into Bihar during the 12th century following various Muslim incursions. They managed to gain control of Gidhaur after expelling the various aboriginal chiefs from the region. Bir Bikram Shah slowly started to expand his chieftaincy to encompass the surrounding areas. Other rulers belonging to this lineage include Sukhdev Singh, Ram Naranjan Singh and Darp Narayan Singh.

=== Chandels of Mirzapur ===
Bijaigarh in modern Mirzapur district of Eastern Uttar Pradesh was ruled by a family of Chandel Rajputs who traced their line to the Burhur Chandels of Rewa. They were notable for their conflict with the Bhumihars of Benares state and for participating in the Indian rebellion of 1857.

=== Bilaspur Princely State ===
The Princely family of Bilaspur State are Chandel claiming descent from Shishupala, who reigned in Chanderi in southern Palputana . But according to Bilaspur Past and Present, Bilaspur Gazetteer and Ganesh Singh's book Chandravansh Vilas and Shashivansh Vinod confirm that the foundation of Kahlur Princely State was laid by Birchand in 697 AD who claims its descent from Chandervanshi Rajputs who reigned at Chanderi in the Chedi to northern Mahismati region, but this is not completely true, Harihar Chand (71st king of Chanderi) made his son Govind Chand the king of Chanderi and in old age came north with Bir Chand.

=== Zaildari ===
A group of Chandel families claiming a common origin once held the zaildaris of Ghund, Madhan, and Theog in present-day Himachal Pradesh. According to their tradition, their ancestor migrated from Chanderi to Bilaspur. After three generations, his descendants moved to Ram Sarai in the Garhwal region. After another four generations, four brothers from the family moved to the Shimla region. The eldest brother became administrator of Madhan; the third youngest - Jai Chand - became the administrator of Theog; and the youngest became the administrator of Ghund.
