= Harsha (Chandela dynasty) =

- Parama-bhattaraka Maharajadhiraja Parameshvara

Chandela king
- Reign: c. 905-925 CE
- Predecessor: Rahila
- Successor: Yashovarman
- Spouse: Kanchuka
- Dynasty: Chandela
- Father: Rahila

Harsha (reigned c. 905 – 925 CE), also known as Shri Harsha (IAST: Śri Harśa), was a king of the Chandela dynasty of India. He ruled in the Jejakabhukti region (Bundelkhand in present-day Madhya Pradesh and Uttar Pradesh).

Harsha married the Chahamana princess Kanchuka, which indicates a rise in his social status. Harsha's successor Yashovarman was their son. The inscriptions do not mention which particular branch of the Chahamanas did Kanchuka belong to.

Harsha is believed to have maintained friendly relations with the Kalachuris. The Varanasi grant of the Kalachuri king Lakshmi-Karna states that he "granted freedom from fear" to Bhoja II, Vallabha-raja), and a king named Harsha. This Harsha has been identified with the Chandela king by some historians, although R. K. Dikshit identifies him with a Guhila prince of Chatsu. The inscription probably implies that Lakshmi-Karna assured these kings that he would not fight wars against them. The same grant also states that the Chandela princess Natta (or Nattakhyadevi) married the Kalachuri king Kokkala I. Natta was probably related to Harsha in some way. R. K. Dikshit theorizes that she was his sister or his paternal aunt.

According to a fragmentary Khajuraho inscription, Harsha restored a king named Kshitipala-deva on the throne. This Kshitipala has been identified with the Gurjara-Pratihara ruler Mahipala. Harsha probably helped Mahipala restore the Pratihara ruler after the Rashtrakuta king Indra III sacked the Pratihara capital Kannauj around 915 CE. Another theory is that Harsha helped Mahipala overthrow the latter's step-brother Bhoja II. Because of the fragmentary nature of the inscription, it is hard to draw any conclusions with certainty.

Several inscriptions of Harsha's descendants eulogize him using conventional terms, praising him for good qualities such as bravery, generosity, modesty, and statesmanship. The Khajuraho epigraphs claim that he ruled the entire earth. He is the earliest known Chandela king to have been given the imperial titles Paramabhattaraka Maharajadhiraja Parameshvara. These inscriptions also mention his military successes in vague terms, but do not specifically name any enemies. Although very little purely historical information is available about Harsha, the available evidence suggests that he was more influential than any of his predecessors, and paved the way for the rise of the Chandelas as a sovereign power.
