= Jayashakti =

King of Jejakabhukti
- Reign: second half of the 9th century
- Predecessor: Vakpati
- Successor: Vijayashakti
- Dynasty: Chandela

Jayashakti (IAST: Jayaśakti) was a 9th-century ruler from the Chandela dynasty of Central India. In the Chandela records, he is generally mentioned with his younger brother and successor, Vijayashakti. The two are believed to have ruled the Chandela kingdom between c. 865 and 885 CE. They consolidated the Chandela power.

Jayashakti succeeded his father Vakpati. He is also known as Jeja or Jejjaka. An inscription found at Mahoba states that the Chandela territory (later called Bundelkhand) was named "Jejakabhukti" after him.

Much of the information about Jayashakti and Vijayashakti in Chandela records is eulogistic in nature, and of little historical value. These records state that they destroyed their enemies, but do not name any of the defeated rulers.

The Kalachuri king Kokkala I married a Chandela princess Naṭṭā-devi. According to R. C. Majumdar, this princess might have been a daughter of Jayashakti. R. K. Dikshit, on the other hand, believes that she was probably a daughter or sister of Jayashakti's nephew Rahila.

Jayashakti probably died without an heir, because of which he was succeeded by his younger brother.
