= Vakpati (Chandela dynasty) =

Chandela king from 845 to 865

- kshitipa

Chandela king
- Reign: c. 845–865
- Predecessor: Nannuka
- Successor: Jayashakti
- Dynasty: Chandela

Vakpati (IAST: Vākpati, r. c. 845–865) was a ruler from the Chandela dynasty of Central India. The Chandela inscriptions mention his title as kśitipa ("lord of the country").

Vakpati is known from two inscriptions found at Khajuraho, dated Vikrama Samvat 1011 (954 CE) and 1059 (1002 CE). He succeeded his father Nannuka as the Chandela ruler. The eulogistic inscriptions describe him as a king famous for his bravery, modesty and knowledge. The inscriptions claim that he defeated several enemies and was a favourite of his subjects. The inscriptions compare him to his namesake Bṛhaspati, the deity of speech, for his wisdom and power of speech. They further state that he surpassed the legendary kings such as Prithu and Kakutstha in combining bravery with wisdom.

An inscription dated to 954 CE states that the "pleasure mountain" (krida-giri) of Vakpati was the Vindhya mountain, where the Kirata women seated on lotuses sang songs about him, as peacocks danced to the sound of waterfalls.

According to R. C. Majumdar, Vakpati might have supported the southern expansion of Devapala, the Pala king of eastern India.

Vakpati had two sons: Jayashakti (Jeja) and Vijayashakti (Vija). He was succeeded by his elder son Jayashakti, who was succeeded by Vijayashakti.
