= Yashovarman (Chandela dynasty) =

Chandela king from 925 to 953

Chandela king
- Reign: c. 925–953
- Predecessor: Harsha
- Successor: Dhanga
- Spouse: Puppa-devi
- Dynasty: Chandela
- Father: Harsha
- Mother: Kanchuka

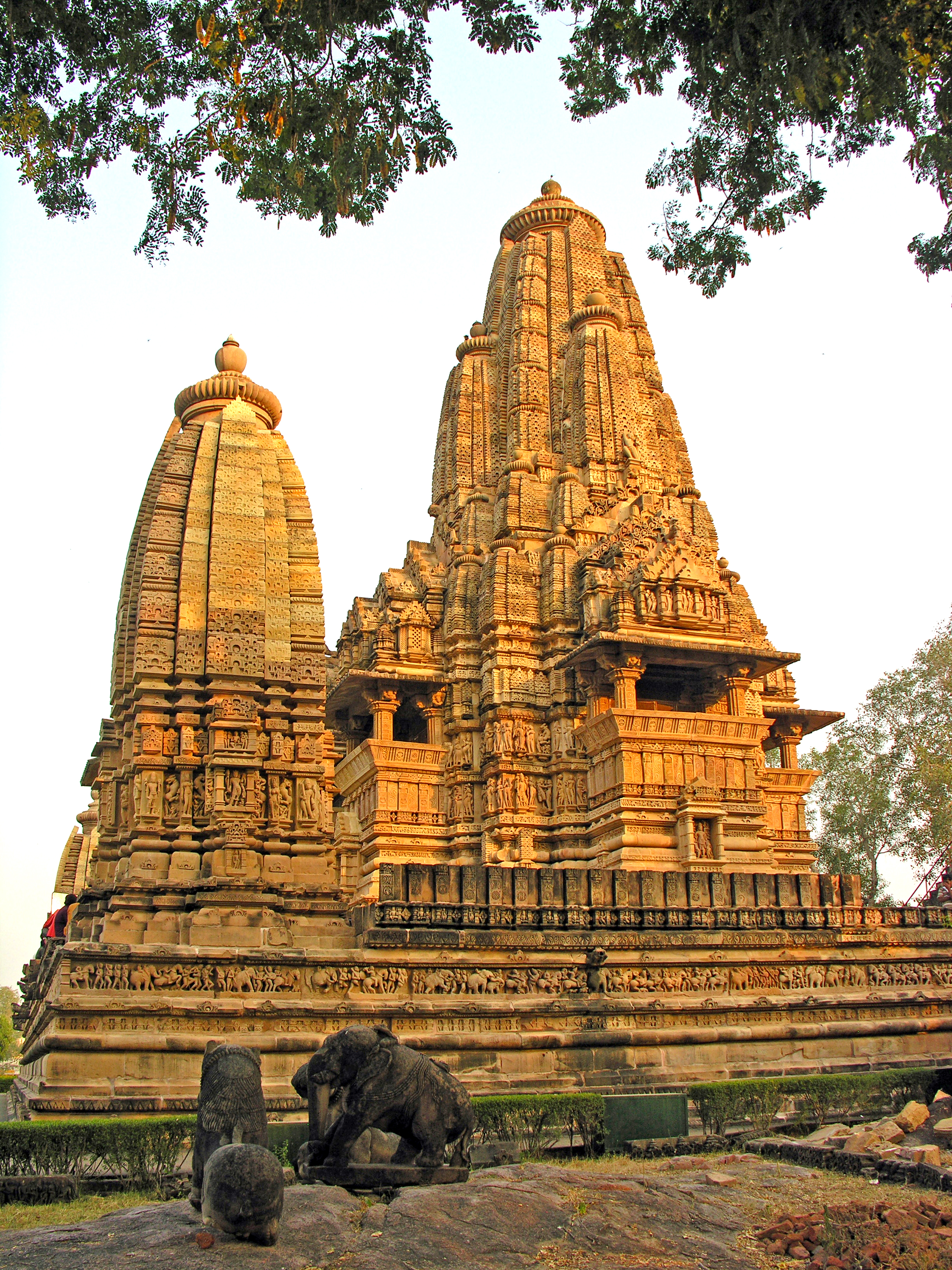
The Lakshmana Temple at Khajuraho

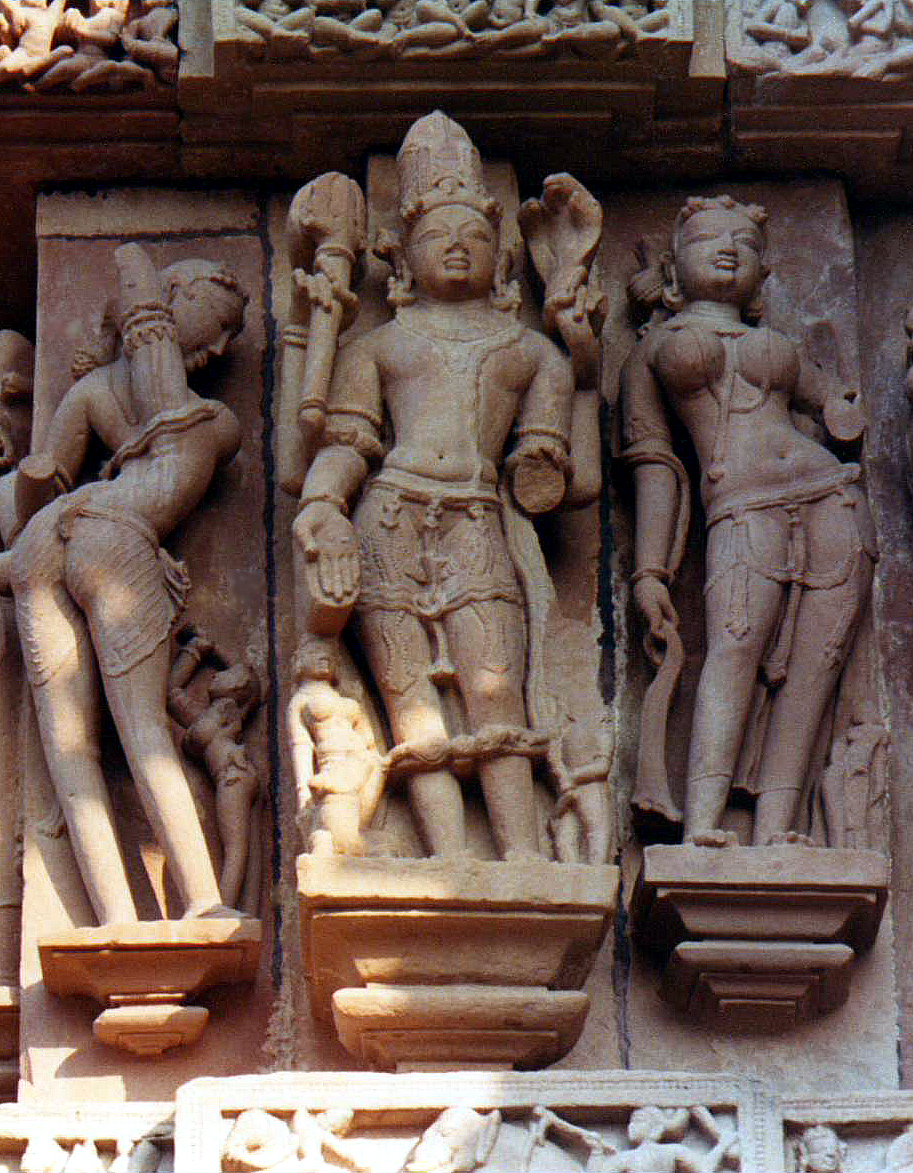
A sculpture at the Lakshmana Temple

Yashovarman (IAST: Yaśovarman; reigned c. 925–953), also known as Lakshavarman, was a king of the Chandela dynasty of India. He ruled in the Jejakabhukti region (Bundelkhand in present-day Madhya Pradesh and Uttar Pradesh). He practically established the Chandelas as a sovereign power, although he formally acknowledged suzerainty of the Gurjara-Pratiharas. His major military achievement was the conquest of Kalanjara (modern Kalinjar). He is also notable for having commissioned the Lakshmana Temple at Khajuraho.

== Early life ==
Yashovarman was born to the Chandela ruler Harsha, who was a feudatory of the Gurjara-Pratiharas of Kanyakubja (Kannauj). His mother was Kanchuka, who came from a Chahamana family. By the time Yashovarman's ascension, the Pratiharas depended on their feudatories to a large extent. The Rashtrakutas, who were the main rival of the Patiharas, were busy in dynastic feuds. This offered the Chandelas an opportunity to increase their own power. Yashovarman did not formally give up the allegiance to the Pratiharas, but he was practically independent.

== Military successes ==
Yashovarman conquered the important fortress of Kalanjara, although the identity of his enemy in this campaign is not certain. One theory is that he conquered Kalanjara from his overlords, the Gurjara-Pratiharas. Another theory is that he defeated the Rashtrakutas, who had captured Kalanjara from the Pratiharas. The Karhad copper-plate inscription of the Rashtrakuta king Krishna III states that "the hope about Kalanjara and Gurjara vanished from the heart of the Gurjara"; that is, the Gurjara-Pratihara king gave up all hopes of retaining control of Kalanjara and Chitrakuta. Based on this, H. C. Ray theorized that Krishna managed to capture these two forts from the Pratiharas. Yashovarman may have captured the fort from the Rashtrakutas, which may explain why he continued to recognize the Pratihara sovereignty even after conquering Kalanjara. However, there is no definitive evidence of Yashovarman's victory over the Rashtrakutas. R. K. Dikshit points out that the Rashtrakuta claim is part of a possibly exaggerated poetic eulogy. It may not imply an actual conquest of these two fortresses, and may only mean that the Pratihara king became apprehensive about losing control over them. K. A. Nilakanta Sastri speculated that Yashovarman captured Kalanjara after allying with the Rashtrakutas and the Chedis (Kalachuris of Tripuri). However, there is no historical evidence attesting the formation of such an alliance. Despite these uncertainties, Yashovarman's conquest of Kalanjara is undisputed: his successors, including his son Dhanga, titled themselves Kalanjaradhipati ("Lord of Kalanjara").

A Khajuraho inscription dated 1011 VS (953-954 CE) credits Yashovarman with several other military successes. It declares:

...the illustrious king Yashovarman, who was a sword to (cut down) the Gaudas as if they were pleasure-creepers; equalled (or treated with contempt) the forces of the Khasas; (and) carried off the treasure of the Kosalas; before whom perished the Kashmiri warriors; who weakened the Mithilas; (and) was as it were a god of death to the Malavas; who brought distress on the shameful Chedis; who was to the Kurus what a storm is to trees; (and) a scorching fire to the Gurjaras.

These claims appear to be exaggerated, as similar claims of extensive conquests in northern India are also found in the records of the other contemporary kings such as the Kalachuri king Yuva-Raja and the Rashtrakuta king Krishna III.

The ruler of the Gauda region (in present-day West Bengal) is believed to be a Pala king, possibly Rajyapala or his successor Gopala III. The Palas attempted to resurrect their power through westward expansion, which might have resulted in their conflict with the Chandelas. The Chandelas did not occupy Gauda, but their invasion further weakened the Pala power, possibly paving way for the subsequent usurpation of the power by the Kambojas.

The Chedis in the Khajuraho inscription denote the Kalachuris of Tripuri. Although the Chandela-Kalachuri relations were friendly in the preceding years, it appears that the Kalachuri alliance with the Rashtrakutas led to a rivalry between the two kingdoms. The Chandelas acknowledged the suzerainty of the Pratiharas, who were the rivals of the Rashtrakutas. The Kalachuris, on the other hand, had forged matrimonial alliances with the Rashtrakutas, and probably aided them in their anti-Pratihara campaigns. The identity of the Kalachuri king defeated by Yashovarman is not certain, because three Kalachuri kings ruled in quick succession as his contemporaries: Bala-harsha, Yuva-Raja and Lakshmana-Raja. S. K. Mitra theorizes that the defeated king might have been Bala-harsha, who ruled for a very short period, and whose name has been omitted from some of the records of his successors.

Yashovarman's achievements in Mithila are not certain; he possibly defeated a tributary ruler who occupied a small territory on the Pratihara-Pala border. The Malavas referred to in the inscription might have been the Paramaras, who were the Rashtrakuta feudatories in Malava region at that time. The Koshalas might have been the rulers of the Dakshin Koshala region, possibly the Somavamshi allies of the Kalachuris. Yashovarman probably raided their territory. The claim of Yashovarman's successes against the Kashmiris seems to be a poetic exaggeration. L. F. Kielhorn translated the verse about the Khasas (tulita Khasabalah) as "equalled the forces of the Khasas". However, according to R. C. Majumdar, in this context, the word tulita means "treated with contempt", not "equalled". The Khasas were the neighbours of the Kashmiris, and this too, seems to be poetic embellishment. The Kuru region was a part of the Pratihara territory, so the claim about the Kurus also seems to be an exaggeration. However, it is possible that the Chandelas clashed with the Gurjara-Pratiharas after their occupation of Kalanjara.

The Khajuraho inscription also states that Yashovarman turned the rivers Ganga and Yamuna into his "pleasure-lakes", and that the waters of these rivers became muddy when his might elephants bathed in them. This suggests that Yashovarman controlled the area around present-day Allahabad.

== Personal life ==
Yashovarman married Puppa, who was the mother of his successor Dhanga. Krishnapa, his other son, was probably deputed to oversee the territory on the Chandela-Parmara frontier.

Yashovarman's reign marked the beginning of the famous Chandela-era art and architecture. He acquired a prestigious statue of Vaikuntha Vishnu from his overlord Devapala, and commissioned the Lakshmana Temple at Khajuraho. This is the earliest example of Nagara architecture at Khajuraho. He is also said to have commissioned a water tank, which can be identified with one of the tanks in Khajuraho.
