= Vijayashakti =

King of Jejakabhukti
- Reign: second half of the 9th century
- Predecessor: Jayashakti
- Successor: Rahila
- Dynasty: Chandela
- Father: Vakpati

Vijayashakti (IAST: Vijayaśakti) was a 9th-century ruler from the Chandela dynasty of Bundelkhand region in central India. In the Chandela records, he is generally mentioned with his elder brother and predecessor Jayashakti. The two are believed to have ruled the Chandela kingdom between c. 865 and 885 CE.

Vijayashakti was the son of Vakpati, and succeeded his elder brother Jayashakti. He is also known as Vija, Vijaya and Vijjaka.

Much of the information about Jayashakti and Vijayashakti in Chandela records is eulogistic in nature, and of little historical value. These records state that they destroyed their enemies, but do not name any of the defeated rulers.

An inscription found at Khajuraho states that Vijayashakti bridged the ocean in order to conquer the South in support of an ally. Historians such as H. C. Ray speculated that as a vassal, he might have conducted a southern expansion on behalf of his masters, the Gurjara-Pratiharas. R. C. Majumdar proposed that he might have conducted the campaign for his Pala allies. However, there is no record of any Chandela campaign in South India. It is possible that the inscription only alludes to the southern expansion of the Chandela territory, not a campaign up to the Indian Ocean in the south.

Vijayashakti was succeeded by his son Rahila.
