= Main Dilli Hoon =

- Genre: History; Documentary
- Created by: Nadira Babbar; Raj Babbar
- Directed by: Nadira Babbar
- Starring: Raj Babbar; Shahbaz Khan; Vaishnavi Mahant; Deep Dhillon; Javed Khan
- Opening theme: Kavitha Krishnamurthy
- Country of origin: India
- Original language: Hindi
- No. of seasons: 1
- No. of episodes: 50

Production
- Producer: Raj Babbar
- Running time: 30 minutes

Original release
- Release: 1998 – 1999

Main Dilli Hoon is 1998 television series on DD National from the Raj Babbar and Nadira Babbar Production House and directed by Nadira Babbar. It was also a web series. The first episode started with the story of Yayati played by actor Raj Babbar and covered the major eras till the Mughal period in Delhi. Other prominent actors in the series were Shahbaz Khan (as Prithviraj Chauhan), Vaishnavi Mahant (as Princess Samyukta), Raj Babbar as Maharaj Prithviraj Chauhan, and Javed Khan (as Qutbu l-Din Aibak).

== Cast ==
- Sharat Saxena as Shukracharya
- Raj Babbar as Maharaj Yayati
- Shahbaz Khan as Maharaj Prithviraj Chauhan
- Vaishnavi Mahant as Rajkumari / Maharani Samyukta
- Deep Dhillon as Maharaj Jaichand
- Javed Khan as Qutbu l-Din Aibak
- Anil Yadav as Muhammad of Ghor
- Gracy Singh as Chakori
- Daman Mann as Alha
- Deepak Jethi as Udal
- Nimai Bali as Maharaj Parikshit
- Parikshit Sahni as Maharaj Bharat
- Anang Desai as Maharaj Anangpal Tomar
- Sudhir Dalvi as Mahamantri Yuyutsu
- Priyanka as Maharani Sharmishtha
- Geeta Gore as Maharani Devyani
- Jiten Lalwani as Yuvraj Janamejaya
- Vikrant Chaturvedi as Astika
- Rammohan Sharma
- Jitendra Trehan
- Adarsh Gautam
- Pankaj Berry
