= Alha-Khand =

Medieval Indian epic

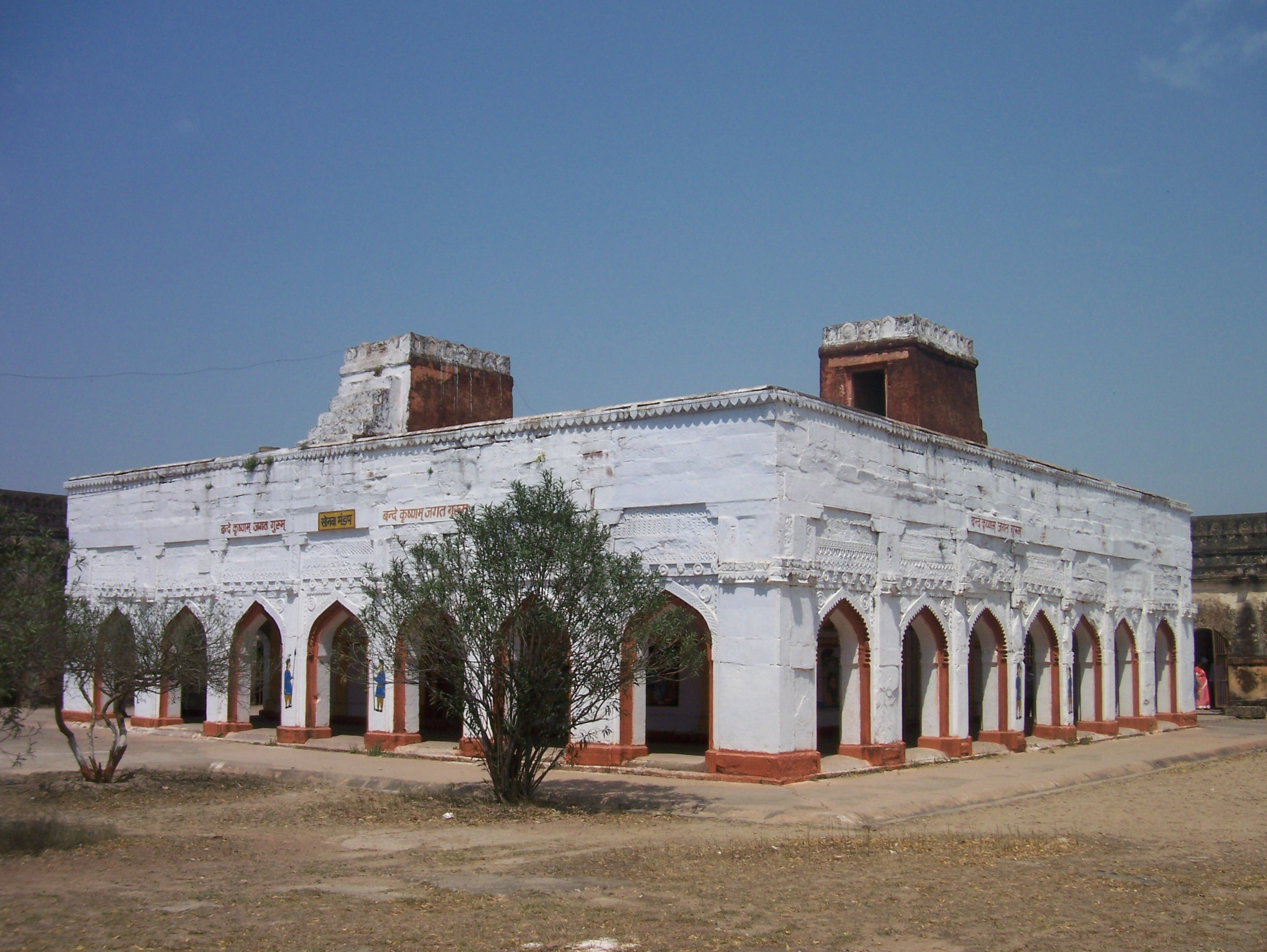
The Sonva Mandap in the Chunar fort, the place, where according to a popular belief, Alha married Sonva

The term Alha Khand is used to refer to poetic works in Bhojpuri, Bagheli, and other regional languages which contains several ballads fictionally describing the exploits of two legendary generals of the twelfth century, Alha and Udal, who belong to the Banaphar clan, who were trustworthy servants of the Chandelas of Jejakabhukti. This bardic tale revolves around the conflicts of these two legendary brothers with Prithviraj Chauhan. The works have been entirely handed down by oral tradition and presently exist in many recensions, which differ from one another both in language and subject matter. The Bundeli, Bagheli, Awadhi, Bhojpuri, Maithili, and Kannauji recensions are the best known among these.

The original language of this work has been continuously modernized over the centuries to suit the dialect of the reciter and it has been lost wholly in this process. This epical work is believed to have been written by Jagnayak (or Jagnik), a contemporary to Chand Bardai and the court poet of Chandela ruler Paramardi. The original work is now lost.

The ballads from this work are still sung during the monsoons by the professional bardic singers (known as the Alhets) in various parts of northern India, mostly in Bihar, eastern Uttar Pradesh and northern Madhya Pradesh. There are two main version of texts.

Mahoba Khand: This work was discovered as a manuscript by Shyamsundar Das in 1901 as one of the two sections of a manuscript labelled "Prithviraj Raso". Shyamsundar Das concluded that it is separate text and published it using the title Parmal Raso in 1919. It has 36 cantos, starting from the origin of the Chandelas and ends with Alha becoming a disciple of yogi Gorakhnath and retiring to forests as a monk. The author laments on the end of the Hindu kingdoms and the beginning of the Pathan rule. It uses the traditional metres like doha, chaupai, chhappaya etc.

Mahoba Samaya is a section of some of the Prithviraj Raso manuscripts. The story given is essentially the same as in Mahoba Khand. It however does not have a section on the origin of Chandellas.

Alha-khand: With 23 cantos, starting with Pritvhiraj winning over Sanyogita and ending with Bela becoming sati. In 1865, Charles Elliott compiled a recension by collating various oral versions into 23 cantos and this recension was the basis of the first printed edition in 1871. Later George Abraham Grierson enlarged this recension with additional inputs. Portions of this recension was translated into English ballad metre by William Waterfield, under the title of The Nine-Lakh Chain or the Maro Feud (1876). Later, this translation, along with the abstracts of the untranslated portions and an introduction written by Grierson was published under the title of The Lay of Alha: A Saga of Rajput Chivalry as Sung by Minstrels of Northern India (1923).

The most popular version of Alha-Khand is the text written by Lalitaprasad Mishra, composed at the request of Prayag Narayan, the son of Munshi Nawal Kishore in Samvat 1956 (1900 CE). The work was written in the Alha metre. It has the same 23 cantos as The Lay of Alha, but has much more detailed narration.

== Characters ==
- Banaphar : Brothers Dasraj (sons Alha, father of Indal, and Udan), Bachchharaj (sons Malkhan and Sulkhan), Todar, Rahmal.
- Chandelas: King Parmal married to Malhna (sister of Parihar Mahil), sons Brahmanand (married to Bela (daughter of Prathviraj), Ranjit, daughter Chandrabal.
- Jagnik: the author, son of Parmal's sister
- Jaichand: last king of Kannauj
- Mir Talhan: The Sayyad who accompanies the Banaphars, with 9 sons and 18 grandsons.
- Prithviraj Chauhan: the father of Bela

== Contents ==
The heroes of this poem are two brothers, Alha and Udal (or incarnation of Babra Bahan), the generals of Parmal's army who fought in the battle of Mahoba between Prithviraj III and Parmal in c.1182. The narration begins with the early exploits of Alha and Udal. They fought with the Karingarai (or Kalingarai) and killed him to avenge the killings of their father Dassaraj (or Dasraj) and uncle Baccharaj. Later they fought the battle of Mahoba. According to the Bhojpuri and the Kannauji recensions, Alha married Sonvati (Sonva), the princess of Nainagarh (Chunar), while according to the some other Western Hindi recensions he married Macchil, the daughter of Raghomacch of Haridwar. Apart from Alha and Udal, the brave deeds of other heroes like Malkhan and Sulkhan (the sons of Baccharaj), Brahamjit (the son of Parmal) and Talhan Syed are also described in this work. This work narrates the details of fifty-two wars in total.

== Historicity ==
The genealogy of Chandela ruler Parmal (Paramardi) given in Mahoba Khand or Alha Khand does not match the genealogy given in Chandela inscriptions. In Mahoba Khand, the father, grandfather and the great-grandfather of Parmal are given as Kirtibramha, Madanbrahma, and Rahilbramha. While Madanavarman (1129–1163), Kirttivarman (1070–1098) and Rahila (9th century) were indeed ancestors of Paramardivarman (1165–1203), most names and the sequence do not match.

According to the Alha Khanda, the Chandela dynasty of Jejakabhukti ended with Paramardivarman (referred to as Parmal in this bardic folklore). However, this is not supported by historical evidence. As per historical evidences and inscriptions, after Paramardivarman, there were about 5-6 emperors who had imperial titles.

== In popular culture ==
- Sabse Bade Ladaiya, a television series based on the ballad aired on DD National from 2012.

== See also ==
- Maniya
