= Paramardi =

King of Jejakabhukti from 1165 to 1203

- Parama-bhattaraka Maharajadhiraja Parameshvara, Kalanjaradhipati

King of Jejakabhukti
- Reign: 1165–1203
- Predecessor: Madanavarman or Yashovarman II
- Successor: Trailokyavarman
- Died: 1203; Kalinjar
- Dynasty: Chandela
- Father: Yashovarman II

Paramardi (reigned c. 1165–1203) was a king of the Chandela dynasty of central India. He was the last powerful Chandela king, and ruled the Jejakabhukti region (Bundelkhand in present-day Madhya Pradesh and Uttar Pradesh). Around 1182–83, Prithviraj Chauhan, raided the Chandela capital Mahoba. Paramardi managed to recover the Chandela power over the next few years, but was defeated by the Ghurid general Qutb ud-Din Aibak around 1202–03.

== Early life ==
Paramardi's Bateshvar inscription suggests that he succeeded his father Yashovarman. However, other Chandela inscriptions (including those of his own) suggest that he succeeded his grandfather Madanavarman. It is possible that Yashovarman ruled for a very short period, or did not rule at all, having died while Madanavarman was still alive.

According to the Parmal Raso, Paramardi ascended the throne at the age of 5 years. An Ajaygarh inscription appears to corroborate this claim: it states that Paramardi was a leader even as a child (bāl-opi netā).

=== Names ===
Paramardi is mentioned as Paramardi-deva in Chandela inscriptions. The medieval bardic legends such as Alha-Khand call him Paramala or Parimala. In modern vernaculars, he is also known as Paramardidev, Parmar, Paramal Deo or Parimal Chandel (because of schwa deletion). A gold coin issued by him, featuring a seated goddess, gives his name as Srimat Paramardi. Another name for him is Paramardi-varman.

== Reign ==
Find spots of the inscriptions from Paramardi's reign

Paramardi was the last of the powerful Chandela rulers, and has been mentioned in several legendary texts such as Paramala Raso (Parmal Raso or Mahoba Khand), Prithviraj Raso and Alha-Khand (Alha Raso or Ballad of Alha). While these texts are based on historical events, much of their content has been fabricated to glorify either Prithviraj Chauhan or Paramardi. Thus, these texts are of doubtful historicity, and therefore, much of Paramardi's reign is shrouded in obscurity.

Several Chandela inscriptions also mention Paramardi, but these contain little historical information. For example, the Semra copper-plate inscription vaguely eulogizes him as someonoe who surpassed Makaradhvaja (the god of love) in handsomeness, the ocean in depth, the lord of heaven in majesty, Brihaspati in wisdom, and Yudhishthira in truthfulness. The Baghari (Bateshvar) stone inscription credits him with military victories and states that other kings bowed to him, but does not name any of these kings. The Ajaygarh inscription of his grandson's wife Kalyanadevi similarly describes him as a universal sovereign, whose enemies were left in a pitiful condition. Such claims of extensive conquests are not corroborated by historical evidence.

=== Early career ===
The inscriptions from the first few years of Paramardi's reign have been found at Semra (1165-1166 CE), Mahoba (1166-1167 CE), Ichhawar (1171 CE), Mahoba (1173 CE), Pachar (1176 CE) and Charkhari (1178 CE). All of these inscriptions use the imperial titles for him: Paramabhattaraka-Maharajadhiraja-Parameshvara Parama-Maheshvara Shri-Kalanjaradhipati Shrimanmat Paramardideva. This indicates that in the early part of his reign, Paramardi retained the territories that he had inherited from his grandfather Madanavarman.

An 1183 CE Mahoba inscription states that the lord of Tripuri fainted whenever he heard the songs about Paramardi's bravery. This suggests that Paramardi defeated a Kalachuri king of Tripuri, possibly Jayasimha.

=== Chahamana invasion ===
During 1182-1183 CE, the Chahamana ruler Prithviraj Chauhan invaded the Chandela kingdom of Jejakabhukti. The Chandela records do not mention this invasion, presumably to avoid describing the humiliating defeat of their king.

According to the medieval ballads, Prithviraj was returning to Delhi after marrying the daughter of Padamsen. During this journey, he was attacked by Turkic forces (Ghurids). The Chauhan army managed to repulse the attacks, but suffered serious casualties in the process. They lost their way, and arrived in the Chandela capital Mahoba. The Chauhan force, which had a number of wounded soldiers among them, unknowingly set up a camp in the Chandela royal garden. They killed the keeper of the garden for objecting to their presence. When Paramardi learned about this, he sent some soldiers to counter the Chauhan force. The Chandelas suffered heavy losses in the ensuing conflict. Paramardi then decided to send another force led by his general Udal against Prithviraj. Udal advised against this proposal, arguing that it would not be appropriate to attack wounded soldiers or to antagonize a powerful king like Prithviraj. However, Paramardi was under the influence of his brother-in-law Mahil Parihar (Pratihara), who secretly harboured ill-will against the Chandelas. Mahil instigated Paramardi to go ahead with the attack plan. The Chandela force led by Udal then launched a second attack against the Chauhan army, but was defeated. The situation subsided when Prithviraj left for Delhi.

Unable to bear Mahil Parihar's political scheming, Udal and his brother Alha left the Chandela court. They took shelter with Jaichand, the Gahadavala ruler of Kannauj. Mahil then sent a secret message to Prithviraj Chauhan, informing him that the best generals of Paramardi had left Mahoba. Instigated by him, Prithviraj set out from Delhi in 1182 CE and marched to the Chandela territory via Gwalior and Bateshwar. First, he besieged Sirsagarh, which was held by Malkhan, a cousin of Alha and Udal. Prithviraj tried to win over Malkhan, but Malkhan remained loyal to Paramardi and fought against the invaders. After Malkhan killed eight generals of the invading army, Prithviraj himself took charge of the battle. The Chandelas ultimately lost the battle, and Malkhan was killed.

Prithviraj then started a march towards Mahoba. Facing an imminent defeat, Paramardi and his nobles sought a truce on the advice of his chief queen Malhan Devi. Prithviraj agreed to the truce, but remained encamped on the banks of the Betwa River in the Chandela territory. The Chandelas, meanwhile, requested Alha and Udal to come back from Kannauj. The two brothers were initially hesitant, but agreed to return after their mother appealed them to honour their allegiance to the Chandelas. Jaichand dispatched an army led by his best generals, including two of his own sons, to support the Chandelas. Paramardi himself became nervous, and retreated to the Kalanjara fort with some of his soldiers. His son Brahmajit, along with Alha and Udal, led the Chandela army against Prithviraj Chauhan. In the ensuing battle, the Chandelas were defeated. Brahmajit, Udal and the two sons of Jaichand were killed in the conflict. After his victory, Prithviraj sacked the Chandela capital of Mahoba.

Next, Prithviraj dispatched his general Chavand Rai to Kalanjara. The Chauhan army captured the fort, took Paramardi as prisoner, and marched back towards Delhi. According to the Parmal Raso, Alha's son Indal Kumar launched a surprise attack on the returning Chauhan army, and freed Paramardi. Out of shame, Paramardi later committed suicide at the Gajraj temple. Parmal Raso states that his 50 wives committed sati (self-immolation) after his death. According to Chand Bardai, he retired to Gaya and died there. The Prithviraj Raso states that Prithviraj appointed Pajjun Rai as the governor of Mahoba. Later, Paramardi's son Samarjit recaptured Mahoba with help of Narasimha, an officer of Jaichand. Samarjit then ruled the territory between Kalanjara and Gaya. However, no such prince is mentioned in the Chandela records.

The exact historicity of this legendary narrative is debatable, but it is known that Prithviraj Chauhan indeed sacked Mahoba. This is corroborated by his stone inscriptions at Madanpur. However, the prolonged occupation of Mahoba or Kalanjara by Chauhans is not supported by historical evidence. Moreover, it is known that Paramardi did not die or retire immediately after the Chauhan victory. He is known to have issued several inscriptions after this event: the Kalanjara rock inscription, the 1184 CE Mahoba stone inscription, the 1187 CE Ajaygarh stone inscription, the 1195 CE Baghari (Bateshvar) stone inscription, and the 1201 CE Kalanjara stone inscription. These records give imperial titles for Paramardi, indicating that he remained a sovereign ruler. The Muslim chronicles also provide evidence that Paramardi ruled until the beginning of the next century, when the Delhi Sultanate invaded the Chandela kingdom.

The 1195 CE Bateshvar inscription states that other feudatory kings bowed before him, and the 1201 CE Kalanjara inscription describes him as the lord of Dasharna country. These evidences suggest that Paramardi managed to recover the Chandela power after Prithviraj Chauhan returned to Delhi.

=== Ghurid invasion and death ===
According to a Kalanjara inscription, while one of Paramardi's predecessors had imprisoned the wives of the earthly rulers, Paramardi's heroics made even the divine rulers anxious about the safety of their wives. As a result, the gods let loose an army of mlechchhas (foreigners) against him, and made him face a defeat.

Prithviraj Chauhan was killed after Second Battle of Tarain against the Ghurids in 1192. After defeating the Chahamanas (Chauhans) and the Gahadavalas, the Ghurid governor of Delhi planned an invasion of Chandela kingdom. A force led by Qutb al-Din Aibak, and accompanied by strong generals such as Iltutmish, besieged the Chandela fort of Kalanjara in 1202.

Taj-ul-Maasir, written by the Delhi chronicler Hasan Nizami, states that Parmar (Paramardi) initially offered some resistance, but then fled to the safety of the fort. Subsequently, he surrendered before ruler of Delhi, and agreed to be his vassal. He promised to pay a tribute to the Sultan, but died before he could execute this agreement. His dewan Aj Deo (Ajaya-Deva) continued to resist the ruler of Delhi after his death. The dewan was finally forced to surrender as the water reservoirs within the fort dried up during a drought. Taj-ul-Masir further states that after the Sultanate's victory, temples were converted into mosques and 50,000 men were taken as slaves. Qutb al-Din Aibak appointed Hazabbar-ud-Din Hasan Arnal as the governor of Kalanjara, and also captured Mahoba.

The 16th century Muslim historian Firishta states that Paramardi was assassinated by his own minister, who disagreed with the king's decision to surrender to the Delhi forces.

Firishta as well as Fakhruddin Mubarakshah state that the fall of Kalanjara happened in the Hijri year 599 (1202–1203 CE). According to Taj-ul-Masir, Kalanjara fell on 20th of Rajab, in the Hijri year 599, on Monday. However, this date corresponds to 12 April 1203, which was a Friday. Based on different interpretations of the historical sources, different scholars date the fall of Kalanjara to either 1202 or 1203.

According to the Chandela inscriptions, Paramardi was succeeded by Trailokyavarman.

== Administration ==
According to the Baghari inscription, Paramardi placed the burden of government on his prime minister Sallakshana, who was a Brahmin of Vashistha gotra. Sallakshana commissioned temples dedicated to Shiva and Vishnu. After his death, his son Purushottama inherited his post.

The Baghari inscription also mentions one Gadadhara as Paramardi's minister of war and peace (sandhna-vigraha-sachiva). According to the Ajaygarh inscription of Bhojavarman, a Kayastha named Gangadhara was the Kancukin (chamberlain) of Paramardi. Gangadhara and his brother Jaunadhara are said to have fought at Kalanjara, possibly in the battle against the Delhi forces.

Ajayapala and Madanapala, the sons of a former senapati (general) Kilhana, were two Brahmin senapatis of Paramardi. Ajayapala is also known to have been a senapati of Paramardi's grandfather Madanavarman. Muslim chronicles mention Aj Deo (Ajaya-Deva) as a dewan who continued to resist the Delhi forces after Paramardi's death. The medieval bardic tradition also mentions Alha and Udala (or Udal) as his generals. Other officers mentioned in the historical records include Mahipala and an amatya named Vatsaraja.

Paramardi was a learned man, and is attributed as the author of a eulogy to Shiva, inscribed on a stone at Kalanjara. He patronized a number of scholars, including:

- Vatsaraja, the author of Rupa-Kashatakam (a collection of six plays)
- Gadadhara, a poet styled as Kavi-Chakravarti
- Jaganika, the author of Alha-Khanda
- Gunabhadra Munipa Saiddhanti, the Jain author of Dhanya-Kumara-Charita

Although himself a Shaivite, Paramardi was tolerant towards Buddhists, Jains and Vaishnavites. A copper-plate inscription shows that when he granted a village to a Brahmin, he respected the rights of a Buddhist shrine located in that village. Several images of the Jain tirthankaras were set up at various places during his reign. The best known of these are at the Aharji Jain Tirth Near Tikamgarh. His minister Sallakshana commissioned a Vishnu temple.
