= Dharti Ka Veer Yodha Prithviraj Chauhan =

Indian television series (2006-2009)

- Intertitle
- Created by: Sagar Arts
- Written by: C.L.Saini
- Screenplay by: Sanjay/Saba Mumtaz/Meenakshi Sagar
- Story by: Meenakshi Sagar/Kalpesh Modi
- Directed by: Dharmesh Shah, Ismail Umar Khan, Nikhil Sinha, Noel Smith, Krishnakant Pandey and Manish Singh
- Creative director: Majid Azam
- Opening theme: "Dharti Ka Veer Yodha Prithviraj Chauhan"
- Composer: Ravindra Jain
- Country of origin: India
- Original language: Hindi
- No. of episodes: 382

Production
- Producers: Moti Sagar, Meenakshi Sagar Amrit Sagar and Akash Sagar
- Production location: Vadodara Gujarat
- Editor: Dipendra Singh Vatsa
- Running time: 24 minutes
- Production company: Sagar Arts

Original release
- Network: StarPlus
- Release: 12 May 2006 – 15 March 2009

Dharti Ka Veer Yodha Prithviraj Chauhan (English: Prithviraj Chauhan, the Brave Warrior of the Land) is an Indian historical drama broadcast on StarPlus. It was produced by Sagars which is based on Prithviraj Raso, a Brajbhasha poem by Chand Bardai which portrays the life of Prithviraj Chauhan, a 12th-century Rajput emperor in India. Rajat Tokas played the younger Prithviraj Chauhan and Anas Rashid played adult Prithviraj Chauhan.

The series is considered one of the costliest ones produced at that time.

== Synopsis ==
The drama is based on Prithviraj Chauhan, a ruler of the Chauhan dynasty. Proficient in military skills, he took the throne of Ajmer at age 13 after his father died in battle. His maternal grandfather, Anangpal Tomar, ruler of Delhi, declared Prithviraj Chauhan his heir after discovering his courage and bravery. This antagonizes his cousin King Jaichand (Jaichand of Kannauj) who was expecting to be declared the heir. Chauhan falls in love with Sanyogita (Samyukta), the daughter of his enemy, Jaichand and elopes with her at her swayamvara ceremony.

== Background ==
The serial is based on the tales of the three most powerful ruling Rajput families of that time: those of Ajmer, Kannauj and Delhi. Roopsundari and Kamlavati are daughters of the King of Delhi, Anangpal I. Kamlavati is married to Someshwar Chauhan of Ajmer and Roopsundari to Vijaypal of Kannauj. Someshwar and Kamlavati are worried about not having an heir. They offer prayers and seek blessings from the God for a child. Someshwar thanks Vijaypal and Roopsundari for supporting them. Kamlavati suggests that Someshwar marry another woman so that the dynasty will have an heir, but he dismisses that suggestion. Finally, Someshwar is happy to know that Kamlavati will soon conceive, and proclaims it. After some time, Kamlavati and Someshwar pray to God and have a son they name Prithviraj Chauhan III. Prithvi is sent to Gurukul to study and gain martial skill. A brilliant student, Prithvi attends the Vansaj of Eklavya who can hit targets with a bow and arrow by merely hearing them which is also known as Shabd Bhedi Baan Vidya.

== Cast ==
- Rajat Tokas/Anas Rashid as Prithviraj Chauhan/Surya
- Mugdha Chaphekar/Pooja Joshi Arora/Sheetal Dabholkar as Sanyogita/Nandini
- Jas Arora as Someshvara Chauhan
- Sunila Karambelkar as Prithvi's mother Maharani Kamlavati
- Rupali Ahuja as Sayaali
- Vinod Kapoor as Someshwar's Mantri Dushyant
- Milind Gunaji as King Vijaychandra of Kannauj
- Surendra Pal as Acharya
- Ravi Patwardhan as Rajpurohit of Ajmer
- Mehul Vyas as Sanjham
- Harsh Somaiya as Chandar
- Harsh Rajput/Altaf Hussain as Pundir
- Kush Sharma//Kumar Hegde as Jaichand
- Imran Khan as Alha
- Raja Gulati/Javed Khan/Shobbit Atre as Chandra Bardai
- Gaurav Kumar – Arjun
- Jay Soni/Preet Saluja as Samar Singh
- Chinky Jaiswal/Swini Khara/Sarika Dhillon as Pritha, Prithviraj's sister
- Ram Awana as Mahipath
- Vishnu Sharma as Jaimal
- Vimmy Bhatt as Jwala
- Shaji Chaudhary as Bhimdev's minister
- Rizwana Seikh/Richa Mukherjee as Vaishali
- Irfan Haossain as Muhammad of Ghor
- Chetan Hansraj as King of Gujrat Bhima II
- Lavina Tandon as Chamki
- Raji Patel as Geetanjali
- Amit Pachori as Sikandar
- Raj Premi- Shera/ Kanha Chauhan
- Anurag Sharma as Elder Vanraj
- Nirav Soni as Kanha
- Varun Anand Mousam as King Kartikey
- Sudeep Sarangi as Arjun

== Production ==
The series was filmed at sets created in Sagar Sun City in Baroda with ₹4 and half crore spent for erecting the sets of palace which also consisted of a desert and a lake and with a budget of ₹20 crores .

In November 2008, the shootings and telecast of all the Hindi television series including this series and films were stalled on 8 November 2008 due to dispute by the technician workers of FWICE (Federation of Western India Cine Employees) for increasing the wages, better work conditions and more breaks between shootings. FWICE first took a strike on 1 October 2008 when they addressed their problems with the producers and production was stalled. A contract was signed after four days discussions and shooting were happening only for two hours content in a day then after which differences increased between them while channels gave them time until 30 October 2008 to sort it out. Failing to do so lead to protests again from 10 November 2008 to 19 November 2008 during which channels blacked out new broadcasts and repeat telecasts were shown from 10 November 2008. On 19 November 2008, the strike was called off after settling the disputes and the production resumed. The new episodes started to telecast from 1 December 2008.

== Reception ==
During June 2006, it garnered its peak rating of 5.67 TVR.

In September 2006, then Vice President of India Bhairon Singh Shekhawat appreciated the channel and producers for the series.

Rajat Tokas received the best actor award in Indian Television Awards in 2007 for his lead role of Prithviraj Chauhan.

== Music ==
Sagar Pictures released an original soundtrack for the television series with lyrics and music by composer Ravindra Jain. The title song was written by Sohan Sharma and composed by Gaurav Issar. The songs were sung by Ajoy Chakrabarty, Udit Narayan, Roop Kumar Rathod, Babul Supriyo, Suresh Wadkar, Sushil Kumar, Shreya Ghoshal and Sadhna Sargam.

- "Dharti Ka Veer Yodha Prithviraj Chauhan" (title song), sung by Shahid Malliya
- "O Vidhaata", sung by Roop Kumar Rathod, Sadhna Sargam
- "Raj Dulare so ja", sung by Sadhna Sargam
- "Uttaradhikaari", sung by Pandit Ajoy Chakrabarty
- "Sun re Megha", sung by Udit Narayan, Shreya Ghoshal
- "Jai Bholenath", sung by Babul Supriyo, Sushil Kumar
- "Mitti", sung by Suresh Wadkar
- "Har Nazar Ko Dua," (Singer unknown)
- "Haayo Rabba," (Singer unknown)
- "Prem Kaahaniyan," (Singer unknown)
- "Kanha Re Thoda Sa Pyaar De," sung by Kavita Krishnamurthy and Suresh Wadkar
- "Mitwaa – male and female versions (Singers unknown)
- "Naa Aankhon Mein Aansu" (Singer unknown)
- "Jai Gauri Jai Namah Shivaay" (Singer unknown)
- "Mere Naam Ki Mehendi" (Singers unknown)
- "Ek Tha Rajkumar (Mere Saathiyaa)" — (Singers unknown)
