= Samrat Prithviraj =

2022 Indian film by Chandraprakash Dwivedi

- Theatrical release poster
- Directed by: Chandraprakash Dwivedi
- Written by: Chandraprakash Dwivedi
- Based on: Prithviraj Raso by Chand Bardai
- Produced by: Aditya Chopra
- Starring: Akshay Kumar; Sanjay Dutt; Sonu Sood; Manushi Chhillar
- Cinematography: Manush Nandan
- Edited by: Aarif Sheikh
- Music by: Score: Sanchit Balhara and Ankit Balhara; Songs: Shankar–Ehsaan–Loy; Alap Desai
- Production company: Yash Raj Films
- Distributed by: Yash Raj Films
- Release date: 3 June 2022
- Running time: 135 minutes
- Country: India
- Language: Hindi
- Budget: ₹150−300 crore (Note: The Print reported the budget to be ₹150 crore. Business Today mentioned that the budget was more than ₹150 crore. But The Times of India, Zee News and The Hindustan Times stated that the budget was ₹175 crore. While India Today, Bollywood Hungama, MensXP, DNA India and The Indian Express reported that the budget to be ₹200 crore. GQ and others sources listed in filming section had reported a budget of ₹300 crore.)
- Box office: est. ₹90.32 crore

Samrat Prithviraj (transl. Emperor Prithviraj) is a 2022 Indian Hindi-language epic historical action drama film written and directed by Chandraprakash Dwivedi and produced by Aditya Chopra under Yash Raj Films. The film is based on Prithviraj Raso, a Braj language epic poem about the life of Prithviraj Chauhan, a king from the Chahamana dynasty. It features Akshay Kumar as the titular character, with Manushi Chhillar (in her Hindi film debut) Sanjay Dutt, Sonu Sood, Manav Vij, Ashutosh Rana, and Sakshi Tanwar in supporting roles.

The film was announced on 9 September 2019, revealing its release date of Diwali 2020. Principal photography began in Jaipur on 15 November 2019, but was halted in March 2020 owing to the COVID-19 pandemic in India, due to which the film was indefinitely postponed. The film's shoot resumed in October 2020 at the YRF Studios. Originally titled Prithviraj, the film was renamed Samrat Prithviraj following a court litigation week ahead of its scheduled release.

Samrat Prithviraj was released on 3 June 2022, and received mixed-to-negative reviews from critics. It was made on a reported budget between ₹150 crore (US$16 million) and ₹300 crore (US$31 million), and grossed ₹90.32 crore (US$9.4 million) worldwide, making it a box office failure.

== Plot ==
In 1192 CE at Ghazni in Afghanistan, Prithviraj is captured by Muhammad Ghori, who forces him to fight against three lions. A blinded Prithviraj can kill all of them but faints.

The story then shifts back a few years in Kannauj, where Princess Sanyogita, Jayachand's daughter, is in love with Prithviraj Chauhan, who is ruling Ajmer. Prithviraj is approached by Mir Hossain who is the brother of Ghori. Hossain eloped with Chitralekha, a dancer in Ghori's kingdom, as both loved each other which caused a rift with Ghori. Prithviraj assures Hossain that he will help him. This act angers Ghori and he decides to attack Ajmer if Prithviraj does not send Hossain back to him. Ghori sends Qutb ud-Din Aibak to Ajmer. Prithviraj rejects Ghori's demand. As Aibak warns him, Prithviraj accepts the demand for a war. This results in the First Battle of Tarain, where Prithviraj, along with Kaka Kanha, Chand Bardai and his men, can defeat Ghori's army, but Hossain is killed in the battle. Meanwhile, Ghori is captured by Prithviraj, but after a few days, he is released.

Prithviraj is selected as ruler of Delhi. He warns that the consequences of this act will not be good. Jayachand decides to organise a svayamvara for Sanyogita and a rajasuya yagya to grow his empire. He asked for 50 per cent control of Delhi, which Prithviraj refused. Jayachand decides to make a statue of Prithviraj on the doorway of his empire, as per the rituals. As the svayamvara starts, Sanyogita decides to put the varmala on Prithviraj's statue. This angers Jayachand. He decides to punish his daughter, but soon Prithviraj approaches with his army and takes Sanyogita as she had chosen Prithviraj as her husband. A furious Jayachand decides to attack Prithviraj but is stopped by his advisors. Soon Prithviraj and Sanyogita get married. After a few days, Jayachand sends his army to attack other forts under Prithviraj. Soon his army captures Gaudpur Fort. While Prithviraj, Sanyogita, Chand Bardai and others are outside, Kaka Kanha, along with Prithviraj's army, decides to recapture Gaudpur fort. They are successful in recapturing the fort. Prithviraj decides to attack Jayachand, but soon reverses the decision, as Kaka Kanha's last wish for Prithviraj was to forgive Jayachand. Later, Prithviraj decides to give equal position to Sanyogita in his darbar. This decision is opposed by other courtiers, but soon Prithviraj manages to get their approval.

Jayachand decides to contact Muhammad Ghori through a merchant and asks him to capture Prithviraj. In exchange, he will hand over anything Ghori wants. Ghori sends Aibak to Delhi. Aibak asks Prithviraj to work under Ghori's rule or he should prepare for another war. Prithviraj accepts the offer of war with Ghori. This resulted in the Second Battle of Tarain. As the battle continues, Ghori's army decreases. Ghori then decides to attack Prithviraj during the night when his army is sleeping. Ghori's army is successful in defeating Prithviraj's army and captures Prithviraj, taking him back to Ghazni. As Ghori's army is approaching Delhi, Sanyogita and other Rajput women perform jauhar (mass suicide by immolation). Ghori refuses to give Prithviraj to Jayachand, thus leaving him shattered by the loss of Ajmer and his daughter.

Delhi is now ruled by Ghori's men. As Prithviraj was captured by Ghori and blinds Prithviraj. Prithviraj is forced to fight with lions, but soon defeats them. He then asks Ghori if anyone wants to attack him, he calls his name, and Chand Bardai is allowed to help him. Soon Prithviraj faints. The next day, the blind Prithviraj is given a chance to save his life along with his army. Ghori's men conclude that Prithviraj will be given 7 arrows along with a bow, and if he is able to kill one man out of the 7, then he will be released. Prithviraj rejects the offer and asks Ghori for only one chance, with one arrow and Ghori himself should come face to face to kill him. Ghori accepts the condition and faces Prithviraj on the battlefield. As Ghori is approaching, Chand Bardai recites a poem to Prithviraj. Inspired through the poem Prithviraj then shoots an arrow into the neck of Muhammad Ghori, instantly killing him. Chand Bardai jumps to Prithviraj to hug him, but both are killed by arrows shot by Ghori's men. Prithviraj's men are released from prison as per the condition. They take the dead bodies of Chauhan and Bardai to perform the final rites.

The film ends with a note that Samrat Prithviraj Chauhan was the last Hindu ruler of Delhi before the Islamic conquest and rule in India for nearly 565 years (1192–1757). As Hindustan became independent in 1947 after many years of foreign rule, Prithviraj Chauhan's death was justified through freedom.

== Cast ==
- Akshay Kumar as Samrat Prithviraj Chauhan
  - Varun Buddhadev as a Young Samrat Prithviraj Chauhan
- Manushi Chhillar as Sanyogita
- Sanjay Dutt as Kaka Kanha
- Sonu Sood as Chand Bardai
- Manav Vij as Muhammad Ghori
- Ashutosh Rana as Jayachandra
- Sakshi Tanwar as Jayachandra's wife
- Lalit Tiwari as Kannauj Purohit
- Govind Pandey as Jayachandra's senapati
- Manoj Joshi as a wealthy merchant
- Arun Bali as Arnoraja
- Rajendra Gupta as Thakurbaba, Prithviraj's adviser
- Vikas Shrivastav as Jayachandra's guard
- Sahidur Rahaman as Qutb-ud-din Aibak
- Kranti Prakash Jha as Hadda Hamir, the general of Samrat Prithviraj's army
- Kamaljeet Rana as Baluk Rai

== Production ==
=== Development ===
Samrat Prithviraj is primarily based on Prithviraj Raso, a Braj language epic poem about the life of Prithviraj Chauhan, a king from the Chahamana dynasty. Chandraprakash Dwivedi had completed script for Prithviraj in 2010, and his first choice for Prithviraj's role was Sunny Deol, with Aishwarya Rai as Sanyogita. However, due to Deol's date issues and no production house interest, he left the project and it was almost shelved, but Dwivedi wanted to still make Prithviraj and after struggling for many years in finding a producer to come on board for him, Yash Raj Films offered to produce the film in 2018, thus reviving the film.

In March 2019, Akshay Kumar confirmed that he had been persuaded to star as Prithviraj. The film's official announcement was made on Kumar's 52nd birthday (9 September 2019), with a motion poster released on social media.

=== Casting ===
It was rumoured before the announcement of the film that Sanjay Dutt would be joining a film with Akshay Kumar. In September 2019, after the announcement of the film, Dutt confirmed that he would be joining Prithviraj. Manav Vij was cast for the role Mohammed Ghori. In November 2019, Manushi Chhillar was confirmed to play the role of Sanyogita, Prithviraj's love interest, making her Bollywood debut and replacing Rai. Later, Sonu Sood and Sakshi Tanwar also joined the cast.

=== Filming ===
Reported budget
Source	Budget (crores ₹)
International; Business Times	300
Amar Ujala	300
Navbharat times	300
Asianet News	300
India TV	200+
The Indian Express	200
Bollywood Hungama	200
Mint	175
Business Today	150+

Principal photography commenced on 15 November 2019 with a puja ceremony in Jamwaramgarh, Jaipur, Rajasthan. A song was shot in January 2020, but filming was halted in March 2020 ordered by the Indian government, owing to the COVID-19 lockdown in India.

Ahead of the 2020 monsoon season, the sets created in Rajasthan were dismantled due to the high cost of maintenance. With no filming expected to take place before the monsoon season, the two sets erected in Dahisar – one of a palace and one of an arena made for an action sequence – were destroyed. Instead, an indoor set was decided to be set up for the resumption of filming.

After 6 months, filming resumed at the YRF Studios in October 2020. Kumar was spotted on-sets on 10 October 2020, while Sood and Chhillar also participated in the schedule. Filming wrapped in February 2021.

Different news sites have reported different budget with values ranging between ₹150 crore (US$16 million) and ₹300 crore (US$31 million).

== Release ==
=== Certification ===
The Central Board of Film Certification gave the film U/A certificate. Films certified U/A contain moderate adult themes that are not strong in nature and can be watched by a child below 12 years of age under parental guidance. The censor board demanded five cuts and adjustments. The committee examining the film asked for a disclaimer to clarify that the people associated with the film did not support or promote Johar (Jauhar), Sati or any other similar activity. Some of the words in the dialogue were changed. The Hindi word haran (translation: abduct) was replaced with waran (select); Nana with sage; kabza (occupation) with hamla (attack); and antim (last) with mahaan (great).

=== Litigations ===
In February 2022, the Delhi High Court dismissed a public interest litigation (PIL) filed by Rashtriya Pravasi Parishad, after the petitioner asked for a withdrawal. The petitioner sought to change the name of the film from Prithviraj to Great Emperor Prithviraj Chauhan, claiming that using Prithviraj Chauhan's name without prefixes is disrespectful.

In March 2022, the organisation Karni Sena started protesting against the film, seeking assurance from the makers that the film would not tamper the historic facts. On 27 May 2022, the title of the film was changed from Prithviraj to Samrat Prithviraj due to PIL issued by Karni Sena.

Gurjar Samaj Sarv Sangthan Sabha Ekta Samanya Samiti, a Gurjar organisation, sued the film-makers in the Delhi High Court and alleged that the film depicted Prithviraj as a Rajput king, and claimed that he was rather a Gurjar king. The petitioners said that the film is based on Prithviraj Raso, which states that Chauhan is a Gurjar king. The petitioners also submitted a Wikipedia article about the movie, among others, as a piece of evidence. They claimed that Prithviraj's portrayal as a Rajput would hurt the sentiments of the Gurjar community. The filmmakers responded that the film is caste neutral and does not depict Chauhan as a Gurjar or a Rajput but portrays him as an Indian warrior and king. The petitioners stated that their grievance was resolved if the film is caste neutral. The court said that the filmmakers were bound by their statement in the court and then disposed of the plea.

=== Theatrical release ===
The film was earlier announced for cinema release on 13 November 2020, coinciding with Diwali. However, it was postponed due to production halt between March and October 2020 due to the COVID-19 pandemic. The film was scheduled to release in theatres on 21 January 2022 in 2D and IMAX, (Note: The film was earlier announced to be releasing in IMAX prints, along with the dubbed versions. However, the film was released only in dubbed versions and IMAX release plans were dropped.) but postponed due to spread of Omicron variant. Finally, the film was theatrically released on 3 June 2022 in Hindi and dubbed versions of Tamil and Telugu languages only.

The film's release was banned in Kuwait and Oman. In Qatar the release was put on hold.

Prior to the release, the film was declared tax-free in Uttar Pradesh, Madhya Pradesh, Gujarat and Uttarakhand.

=== Home media ===
The film started digitally streaming on Amazon Prime Video on 1 July 2022.

== Reception ==
=== Box office ===
Samrat Prithviraj was released in 5,000 theatres worldwide. It earned ₹10.7 crore (US$1.1 million) at the domestic box office on its opening day. This earning was less than the expected earning of ₹15 crore (US$1.6 million) for first day. The opening weekend was expected to recover the earnings; however it fell short of expectation with an earnings of ₹12.6 crore (US$1.3 million) and ₹16.1 crore (US$1.7 million) on Saturday and Sunday respectively.

The film faced heavy competition from Bhool Bhulaiyaa 2 and Vikram. On Monday, the fourth day after the release of the movie, the earnings have collapsed amounting to about ₹5 crore (US$520,000), less than 50% compared to the opening day. The morning shows of the film started getting cancelled due to zero occupancy in theatres. The shows that were not cancelled had single-digit occupancy. The Indian Express reported the film having a downward trend and turned out to be a box office flop. The reduction and cancellations of the shows was attributed to an abundance of screens forcing the occupancy to be low.

As of 30 July 2022, the film grossed ₹81.01 crore (US$8.4 million) in India and ₹9.31 crore (US$970,000) overseas, for a worldwide gross collection of ₹90.32 crore (US$9.4 million).

After the poor performance theatrically, YRF planned to recover some of the production costs by releasing the film early on Amazon Prime Video, for streaming.

=== Critical response ===
Samrat Prithviraj received mixed-to-negative reviews from critics. On the review aggregator website Rotten Tomatoes, 18% of 11 critics' reviews are positive, with an average rating of 4.5/10.

Shubhra Gupta of The Indian Express rated the film 2 out of 5 stars and wrote "As befits its simplistic, shorn-of-nuance tone, this Akshay Kumar-Manushi Chhillar film is larger-than-life and stays completely faithful to its stated intent". Saibal Chatterjee of NDTV rated the film 2 out of 5 stars and wrote "A historical drama of this magnitude needed more than just a big budget. It required a sharper eye, a larger vision and a greater degree of integrity, none of which is within its grasp". Anuj Kumar reviewing for The Hindu wrote "Director Chandraprakash Dwivedi's film seeks to revive cultural nationalism, but doesn't serve the purpose of those who wish to reap the past for a political harvest". He further said that Akshay Kumar has disappointed in the lead role and that the film "neither does justice to its source nor its subject". Tanul Thakur of The Wire in his review said, "There's absolutely no sense of character or plot progression throughout – people seem like tacky mission statements; subplots are heaps of propagandistic infomercials. There's no sense of intrigue or discovery, turning the entire film into an insufferable road trip".

Tatsam Mukherjee of Firstpost rated the film 1 out of 5 stars and wrote "Samrat Prithviraj unfolds like a straightforward sequence of Wikipedia entries: early childhood, first battle, marriage, second battle, death, legacy". A critic for Pinkvilla rated the film 2.5 out of 5 stars and wrote "Samrat Prithviraj is strictly an average affair, with a rather flat screenplay. The historical is primarily watchable due to three strong sequences:The opening act, the intermission block, and the finale, but the brave Indian warrior deserved a better film. Nairita Mukherjee of India Today rated the film 2.5 out of 5 stars and wrote "If Bollywood's fate rests on Samrat Prithviraj, the future is blank".

Rachana Dubey of The Times of India rated the film 3.5 out of 5 stars and wrote "Samrat Prithviraj is a well-performed and well-directed family drama. It doesn't have the opulence that we have seen in other historical dramas". Devesh Sharma of Filmfare rated the film 3.5 out of 5 stars and wrote "It's fondly trying to recreate a time when everything was just and honourable, while also showing that it"s our own disunity which allowed the invaders to step in". A critic for Bollywood Hungama rated the film 3.5 out of 5 stars and wrote "The Akshay Kumar film Samrat Prithviraj is an inspiring and entertaining saga of one of the greatest kings of Indian history". Bohni Bandyopadhyay of News 18 rated the film 3 out of 5 stars and wrote "Akshay Kumar and Manushi Chhillar starrer evokes sentiments of patriotism and Rajput valour, trying to recreate the dramatic love story of Samrat Prithviraj and princess Sanyogita". Deepa Gahlot of Rediff rated the film 3 out of 5 stars and wrote "Akshay Kumar plays the part with enthusiasm, like he was just waiting to get into the costume of a historical hero". Geeta Pandey of BBC News wrote that the film is riddled with historical inaccuracies. Some criticised the movie being made under the BJP government to paint India's Muslim minorities as outsiders and cruel invaders.

== Music ==
Samrat Prithviraj

Soundtrack album by Shankar–Ehsaan–Loy
- Released: May 19, 2022
- Recorded: 2021
- Studio: YRF Studios
- Genre: Feature film soundtrack
- Length: 23:00 (All languages)
- Label: YRF Music

Shankar–Ehsaan–Loy chronology
Dhaakad (2022)	Samrat Prithviraj (2022)

Official audio
- Samrat Prithviraj - Full Album on YouTube

The film's soundtrack consists of five songs, four of which are composed by Shankar–Ehsaan–Loy and 1 song "Aigiri Nandini" composed by Alap Desai, while the film score was composed by Sanchit Balhara and Ankit Balhara.

All lyrics are written by Varun Grover.

Hindi
No.	Title	Singer(s)	Length
1.	"Hari Har"	Adarsh Shinde	4:14
2.	"Hadd Kar De"	Neeti Mohan, Keerthi Sagathia	4:02
3.	"Makhmali"	Arijit Singh, Shreya Ghoshal	4:04
4.	"Yoddha"	Sunidhi Chauhan	4:03
5.	"Aigiri Nandini" (Music by Alap Desai)	Alap Desai, Rahul Chitnis, Vivek Naik, Saurabh Wakhare, Raghav Dave, Mahavir Kubadia	2:54
6.	"Prithviraj Theme"	Instrumental	1:45
7.	"Sanyogita’s Theme"	Manya Narang	1:58
Total length:			23:00

All lyrics are written by Madhan Karky.

Tamil
No.	Title	Singer(s)	Length
1.	"Avan Avan"	Diwakar	4:14
2.	"Azhaikiradhae"	Neeti Mohan, Yazin Nizar	4:02
3.	"Menmayaay"	Haricharan, Chinmayi, Yazin Nizar	4:04
4.	"Undhan Padai Anbae"	Sunidhi Chauhan	4:03
5.	"Aigiri Nandini" (Music by Alap Desai)	Alap Desai, Madhan Karky	2:54
6.	"Prithviraj Theme"	Instrumental	1:45
7.	"Sanyogita’s Theme"	Manya Narang	1:58
Total length:			23:00

All lyrics are written by Chaitanya Prasad.

Telugu
No.	Title	Singer(s)	Length
1.	"Hari Hara"	Diwakar	4:14
2.	"Haddhu Cheripey"	Neeti Mohan, Yazin Nizar	4:02
3.	"Mrudhumayee"	Haricharan, Chinmayi, Yazin Nizar	4:04
4.	"Yoddha"	Sunidhi Chauhan	4:03
5.	"Aigiri Nandini" (Music by Alap Desai)	Alap Desai, Chaitanya Prasad	2:54
6.	"Prithviraj Theme"	Instrumental	1:45
7.	"Sanyogita’s Theme"	Manya Narang	1:58
Total length:			23:00
