= Madanavarman =

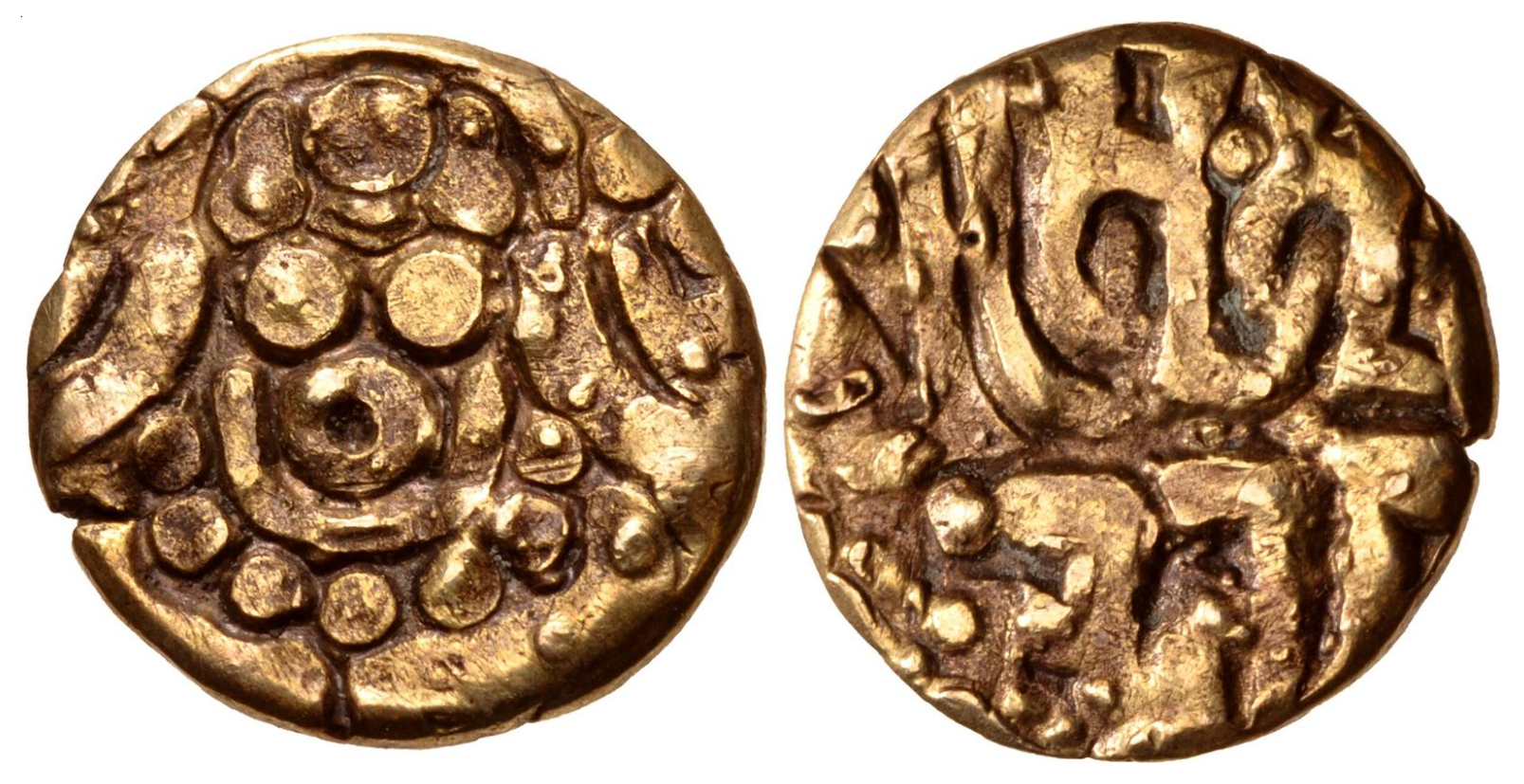
- Coinage of Madanavarman (1128-1165 CE), Chandelas of Jejakabhukti.

King of Jejakabhukti
- Reign: c. 1128–1165 CE
- Predecessor: Prithvivarman
- Successor: Yashovarman II or Paramardi
- Issue: Yashovarman
- Dynasty: Chandela
- Father: Prithvivarman

Madana-Varman (reigned c. 1128–1165 CE) was a king of the Chandela dynasty of India. He succeeded his father Prithvi-Varman as the ruler of the Jejakabhukti region (Bundelkhand in present-day Madhya Pradesh and Uttar Pradesh). He revived the Chandela glory by subduing the neighbouring kingdoms, and commissioned several tanks and temples.

== Military career ==
The inscriptions of Madanavarman's successors describe his military achievements using conventional praises, but do not provide any specific details. The Baghari inscription of Paramardi boasts that Madanavarman scattered his enemies with his sword, just like the warrior-deity Indra cut off the wings of the mountains and killed the Vala demon. It further states that his enemies saw his red sword as they moved rapidly towards their own destruction, just as Rahu comes in contact with a newly-arisen sun. It also describes the pitiful condition of his enemies' wives, as they tearfully talked to their pet parrots with no hopes of their husbands' return from the battlefield.

=== Relations with the neighbours ===
The Mau inscription of Madanavarman's minister Gadadhara states that the minister helped the Chandela king subdue all other kings. It claims that the Chedi king fled on listening Madanavarman's name, the king of Kashi remained friendly to him out of fear, the arrogant king of Malava was quickly exterminated, and the other kings enjoyed supreme comfort by paying homage to him. While these are obvious exaggerations by a court poet, it appears that Madanavarman was able to exert political influence over these rulers.

- The Chedi king can be identified with the Tripuri Kalachuri king Gaya-Karna. The defeats of his predecessors by the Paramaras and the Gahadavalas had weakened the Kalachuri kingdom. Taking advantage of this situation, Madanavarman may have annexed the northern part of the Baghelkhand region, as suggested by the Panwar hoard of his coins. The inscriptions of Gaya-Karna's successor Narasimha have been discovered in this region, at Lal Pahadi (1158 CE) and Alhaghat (1159 CE). This suggests that the Chandelas could not retain this territory for long.
- The king of Malava can be identified with the Paramara king Yashovarman or his son Jayavarman. The Paramaras had been weakened after being defeated by the Gujarat Chaulukya king Jayasimha Siddharaja. Madanavarman may have seized this opportunity to capture a part of the Paramara territory. According to the 1134 CE Augasi inscription, Madanavarman was residing at Bhaillasvamin (Bhilsa or Vidisha) bear the Chandela-Paramara border. The Semra inscription of his successor Paramardi also indicates that the Chandelas crossed the Betwa River and annexed a part of the Paramara territory. This region was recaptured by Yashovarman's son Lakshmivarman, as indicated by a 1200 VS (1143-44 CE) inscription.
- The king of Kashi can be identified with the Gahadavala ruler Govinda-Chandra, who appears to have maintained friendly relations with the Chandelas.

=== Conflict with Jayasimha Siddharaja ===
A Kalanjara inscription states that Madanavarman defeated the Gurjara king in an instant, just like Krishna defeated Kamsa. Gurjara here refers to Gujarat, and its king is identified with the Gujarat Chaulukya ruler Jayasimha Siddharaja. The Chaulukya and the Chandela kingdoms were separated by the Paramara territory, and the defeat of the Paramaras by Jayasimha probably led to a conflict between the two powers.

The Prithviraj Raso of Chand Bardai mentions the defeat of a Chaulukya ruler, which seems to corroborate the claim made in the Kalanjara inscription. However, the Gujarat chronicles state that it was Jayasimha who emerged victorious in this conflict. According to the Kumarapala-Charita, Jayasimha defeated the king of Mahoba (that is, Madanavarman). The Kirti-Kaumudi states that Madanavarman paid a tribute to Jayasimha after seeing the fate of ruler of Dhara (the Paramara king).

The Kumarapala-Prabandha narrates a similar legend: A bard once told Jayasimha that the Chandela king was a very wise, generous and pleasure-loving ruler, whose court was as splendid as that of Jayasimha. On hearing this, Jayasimha deputed another person to verify this claim. When the claim was confirmed, he marched against the Chandelas. After reaching the outskirts of Mahoba, he sent an emissary, asking Madanavarman to surrender. Madanavarman was busy celebrating the spring festival, and did not take the demand seriously. When the emissary reminded him about the fate of the Paramaras, he derisively asked his minister to make Jayasimha return by paying him some money. Jayasimha received the money, but when he heard about Madanavarman's nonchalance, he refused to return without meeting the Chandela king. He visited the Chandela palace with a large retinue. Only four of his attendants were allowed to accompany him inside the palace, but Madanavarman offered him a warm reception. Consequently, Jayasimha returned to his capital peacefully.

According to K. M. Munshi, the above-mentioned legend is "fanciful", and Jayasimha did not achieve much success against the Chandelas. Historian R. K. Dikshit theorizes that the conflict between Jayasimha and Madanavarman was inconclusive, with both the sides claiming victory.

=== Other campaigns ===
A fragmentary Mahoba inscription dated 1240 VS (1183-84 CE) contains a vague reference to wars with Anga, Vanga and Kalinga. These probably refer to Madanavarman's campaign in eastern India.

== Extent of the kingdom ==
Compared to the other Chandela rulers, an unusually large number of coins and inscriptions are available from his reign. The locations of their discoveries and the place names mentioned in the various inscriptions indicate that Madanavarman's kingdom roughly included the Vindhyan region from Kaimur Range in the west to the Bhanrer Range in the east, between the Betwa and the Yamuna rivers.

Inscriptions from his reign have been found at Augasi (Banda district), Ajaygarh, Barigar (near Charkhari), Kalanjara, Khajuraho, Mahoba, Mau, and Papaura (Tikamgarh district). The Augasi copper-plate inscription states that it was issued at Bhilsa (Vidisha), which indicates that Bhilsa was also a part of his kingdom. The Barigar (Varidurga) inscription mentions several places which can be identified with parts of the present-day Damoh, Jhansi, and Sagar districts. A coin hoard found at Panwar in Rewa district suggests that the Bagelkhand area was also a part of his kingdom.

== Administration ==
Madanavarman's prime minister was Gadadhara, who had also served his father. The Mau inscription praises Gadadhara for his knowledge of the Vedas and his pious acts, including the construction of a Vishnu temple and a tank near Deddu village. Madanavarman's chief counsellor was a learned Brahmin named Lahada, who was proficient in arts.

Madanavarman's senapati (chief general) was Ajayapala, who is mentioned in Paramardi's Semra inscription as the son of senapati Kilhana. His maha-pratihara (chief chamberlain) was Samgrama-Simha, who is mentioned in a Kalanjara inscription.

Madanavarman issued gold, silver and copper coins featuring a seated goddess. He also issued copper coins featuring the deity Hanuman. These coins mention his name as Shriman Madana-Varma-Deva.

== Public works ==
According to the Paramala-Raso, Madanavarman commissioned a large number of tanks and temples. He also gifted large amounts of gold, jewels, horses, and elephants to Brahmins.

Madanavarman's name is found on the buildings at Ajaygarh and Kalanjara. The ruined Shiva and Vishnu temples located around the lake at Mahoba are ascribed to him. The ruined temple of Madanesha-Sagara-Pura in Ahar (Tikamgarh district) also bears his name. Tanks named "Madana-Sagara" (or Madan Sagar) after him are located in Mahoba, Jatara and Ahar-Narayanpura area of Tikamgarh district. Temples commissioned by him were once located on the banks of these tanks. Several other places are named after Madanavarman; these include Madanpura in Jhansi district and Madankhera near Mahoba.

Several images of Jain tirthankaras from his reign have been found at Ahar, Khajuraho, Mahoba, Papaura and other places.

== Personal life ==
An 1192 CE inscription of Madanavarman, now at Bharat Kala Bhavan, mentions three of his queens: Maharani (chief queen) Valhana-Devi, Rajni Lakhamadevi and Rajni Chaandala devi.

According to a Kalanjara inscription, Pratapa-Varman was his younger brother. Madanavarman's son was Yasho-Varman II, and his grandson was Paramardi-Deva. Yasho-Varman either did not rule, or ruled for a very short time. Historical evidence suggests that Madanavarman was succeeded by Paramardi.
