= Banaphar =

Clan from the Indian subcontinent

Banaphar, also spelled Banafar and Banafer, is a clan of mixed Ahir and Rajput descent native to the Indian subcontinent.

The legendary 12th century generals Alha and Udal, who appear in the Alha-Khand ballads, were said to belong to this clan. In the ballads, the Banaphars was susceptible to "mean caste" slurs from other Rajputs because of their "mixed" background. Ballads referring to Alha and Udal describe great bravery in the medieval period.
