= Prithviraj Chauhan =

King of Ajmer from 1177 to 1192

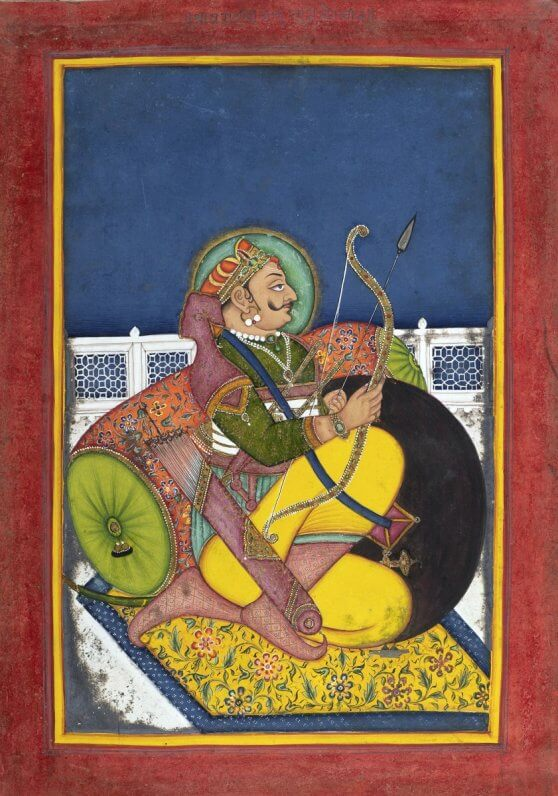
- Posthumous painting depicting Prithviraj Chauhan seated on a terrace leaning against a bolster from Kota

King of Sapadalaksha
- Reign: c. 1177–1192
- Predecessor: Someshvara
- Successor: Govindaraja IV
- Born: 1166; Gujarat
- Died: 1192 (aged 25–26); Ajmer
- Spouse: Sanyogita
- Dynasty: Chahamanas of Shakambhari
- Father: Someshvara
- Mother: Karpuradevi (Kalachuri Princess)
- Religion: Hinduism

Prithviraja III (IAST: Pṛthvī-rāja; c. 1166 – 1192), popularly known as Prithviraj Chauhan or Rai Pithora, was a king from the Chauhan (Chahamana) dynasty who ruled the territory of Sapadalaksha, with his capital at Ajmer in present-day Rajasthan in north-western India. Ascending the throne as a minor in 1177 CE, Prithviraj inherited a kingdom which stretched from Thanesar in the north to Jahazpur (Mewar) in the south, which he aimed to expand by military actions against neighbouring kingdoms, most notably defeating the Chandelas.

Prithviraj led a coalition of several Rajput kings and defeated the Ghurid army led by Muhammad of Ghor near Taraori in 1191 However, in 1192, Muhammad returned with an army of Turkish mounted archers and defeated the Rajput army on the same battlefield. Prithviraj was captured and summarily executed, although his minor son Govindaraja was reinstated by Muhammad as his puppet ruler in Ajmer. His defeat at Tarain is seen as a landmark event in the Islamic conquest of India, and has been described in several semi-legendary accounts, most notably the Prithviraj Raso.

== Sources of information ==
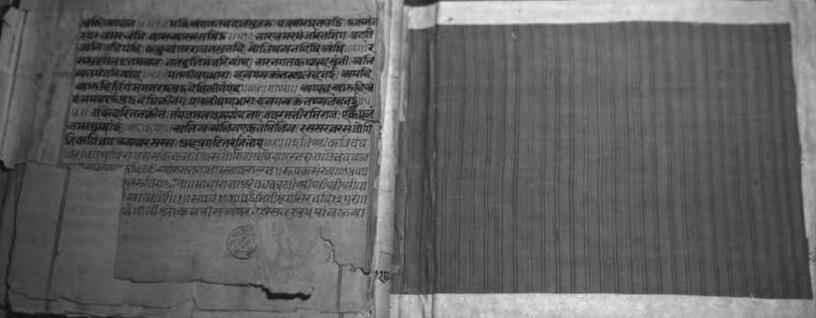
Prithviraj Raso manuscript, Maharaja Man Singh Pustak Prakash, Jodhpur

The extant inscriptions from Prithviraj's reign are few in number and were not issued by the king himself. Much of the information about him comes from the medieval legendary chronicles. Besides the Muslim accounts of Battles of Tarain, he has been mentioned in several medieval kavyas (epic poems) by Hindu and Jain authors. These include Prithviraja Vijaya, Hammira Mahakavya and Prithviraj Raso. These texts contain eulogistic descriptions, and are, therefore, not entirely reliable. Prithviraja Vijaya is the only surviving literary text from the reign of Prithviraj. Prithviraj Raso, which popularized Prithviraj as a great king, is purported to be written by his court poet Chand Bardai. However, it contains many exaggerated accounts, much of which is not useful for the purposes of history.

Other chronicles and texts that mention Prithviraj include Prabandha-Chintamani, Prabandha Kosha and Prithviraja Prabandha. These were composed centuries after his death, and contain exaggerations and anachronistic anecdotes. Prithviraj has also been mentioned in Kharatara-Gachchha-Pattavali, a Sanskrit text containing biographies of the Kharatara Jain monks. While the work was completed in 1336 CE, the part that mentions Prithviraj was written around 1250 CE. The Alha-Khanda (or Alha Raso) of the Chandela poet Jaganika also provides an exaggerated account of Prithviraj's war against the Chandelas.

Some other Indian texts also mention Prithviraj but do not provide much information of historical value. For example, the Sanskrit poem anthology Sharngadhara-paddhati (1363) contains a verse praising him, and the Kanhadade Prabandha (1455) mentions him as an earlier incarnation of the Jalore Chahamana king Viramade.

== Early life ==
Prithviraj was born to the Chahamana king Someshvara and queen Karpuradevi (a Kalachuri princess). Both Prithviraj and his younger brother Hariraja were born in Gujarat, where their father Someshvara was brought up at the Chaulukya court by his maternal relatives. According to Prithviraja Vijaya, Prithviraj was born on the 12th day of the Jyeshtha month. The text does not mention the year of his birth, but provides some of the astrological planetary positions at the time of his birth, calling them auspicious. Based on these positions and assuming certain other planetary positions, Dasharatha Sharma calculated the year of Prithviraj's birth as 1166 CE (1223 VS).

The medieval biographies of Prithviraj suggest that he was educated well. The Prithviraja Vijaya states that he mastered 6 languages; the Prithviraj Raso claims that he learned 14 languages, which appears to be an exaggeration. The Raso goes on to claim that he became well-versed in a number of subjects, including history, mathematics, medicine, military, painting, philosophy (mimamsa), and theology. Both the texts state that he was particularly proficient in archery.

== Reign ==
=== Early reign ===
Prithviraj moved from Gujarat to Ajmer, when his father Someshvara was crowned the Chahamana king after the death of Prithviraja II. Someshvara died in 1177 CE (1234 VS), when Prithviraj was around 11 years old. The last inscription from Someshvara's reign and the first inscription from Prithviraj's reign are both dated to this year. Prithviraj, who was a minor at the time, ascended the throne with his mother as the regent. The Hammira Mahakavya claims that Someshvara himself installed Prithviraj on the throne, and then retired to the forest. However, this is doubtful.

During his early years as the king, Prithviraj's mother managed the administration, assisted by a regency council.

Kadambavasa served as the chief minister of the kingdom during this period. He is also known as Kaimasa, Kaimash or Kaimbasa in the folk legends, which describe him as an able administrator and soldier devoted to the young king. Prithviraja Vijaya states that he was responsible for all the military victories during the early years of Prithviraj's reign. According to two different legends, Kadambavasa was later killed by Prithviraj. The Prithviraja-Raso claims that Prithviraj killed the minister after finding him in the apartment of the king's favourite concubine Karnati. Prithviraja-Prabandha claims that a man named Pratapa-Simha conspired against the minister, and convinced Prithviraj that the minister was responsible for the repeated Muslim invasions. Both these claims appear to be historically inaccurate, as the much more historically reliable Prithviraja Vijaya does not mention any such incident.

Bhuvanaikamalla, the paternal uncle of Prithviraj's mother, was another important minister during this time. According to Prithviraja Vijaya, he was a valiant general who served Prithviraj as Garuda serves Vishnu. The text also states that he was "proficient in the art of subduing nāgas". According to the 15th-century historian Jonaraja, "naga" here refers to elephants. However, Har Bilas Sarda interpreted Naga as the name of a tribe, and theorized that Bhuvanaikamalla defeated this tribe.

According to historian Dasharatha Sharma, Prithviraj assumed actual control of the administration in 1180 CE (1237 VS).

=== Conflict with Nagarjuna and Bhadanakas ===
The first military achievement of Prithviraj was his suppression of a revolt by his cousin Nagarjuna, and recapture of Gudapura (IAST: Guḍapura; possibly modern Gurgaon). Nagarjuna was a son of Prithviraj's uncle Vigraharaja IV, and the struggle for the Chahamana throne had led to a rivalry between the two branches of the family.

According to Prithviraja Vijaya, Nagarjuna rebelled against Prithviraj's authority and occupied the fort of Gudapura. Prithviraj besieged Gudapura with a large army comprising infantry, camels, elephants and horses. Nagarjuna fled the fort, but Devabhata (possibly his general) continued to offer resistance. Ultimately, Prithviraj's army emerged victorious, and captured the wife, mother, and followers of Nagarjuna. According to Prithviraja Vijaya, a garland made of the defeated soldiers' heads was hung across the Ajmer fort gate.

Two verses of Kharatara-Gachchha-Pattavali mention the victory of Prithviraj over the Bhadanakas, while describing a debate between two Jain monks. This victory can be dated to sometime before 1182 CE, when the said debate took place. According to Cynthia Talbot, the Bhadanakas were an obscure dynasty who controlled the area around Bayana. According to Dasharatha Sharma, the Bhadanaka territory comprised the area around present-day Bhiwani, Rewari and Alwar.

=== War against Chandelas ===
The 1182–83 CE (1239 VS) Madanpur inscriptions from Prithviraj's reign claim that he "laid to waste" Jejakabhukti (present-day Bundelkhand), which was ruled by the Chandela king Paramardi. Prithviraj's invasion of the Chandela territory is also described in the later folk legends, such as Prithviraj Raso, Paramal Raso, and Alha-Raso. Other texts such as Sarangadhara Paddhati and Prabandha Chintamani also mention Prithviraj's attack on Paramardi. The Kharatara-Gachchha-Pattavali mentions that Prithviraj had embarked upon a digvijaya (conquest of all the regions). This appears to be a reference to the start of Prithviraj's march to Jejakabhukti.

The legendary account of Prithviraj's campaign against the Chandelas goes like this: Prithviraj was returning to Delhi after marrying the daughter of Padamsen, when his contingent was attacked by the "Turkic" forces (Ghurids). His army repulsed the attacks but suffered serious casualties in the process. Amid this chaos, the Chahamana soldiers lost their way and unknowingly encamped in the Chandela capital Mahoba. They killed the Chandela royal gardener for objecting to their presence, which led to a skirmish between the two sides. The Chandela king Paramardi asked his general Udal to attack Prithviraj's camp, but Udal advised against this move. Paramardi's brother-in-law Mahil Parihar ruled modern-day Orai; he harboured ill-will against Paramardi and instigated the king to go ahead with the attack. Prithviraj defeated Udal's contingent and then left for Delhi. Subsequently, unhappy with Mahil's scheming, Udal and his brother Alha left the Chandela court. They started serving Jaichand, the Gahadavala ruler of Kannauj. Mahil then secretly informed Prithviraj that Chandela kingdom had become weak in absence of its strongest generals. Prithviraj invaded the Chandela kingdom and besieged Sirsagarh, which was held by Udal's cousin Malkhan. After failing to win over Malkhan through peaceful methods and losing eight generals, Prithviraj captured the fort. The Chandelas then appealed for a truce, and used this time to recall Alha and Udal from Kannauj. In support of the Chandelas, Jaichand dispatched an army led by his best generals, including two of his own sons. The combined Chandela-Gahadavala army attacked Prithviraj's camp, but was defeated. After his victory, Prithviraj sacked Mahoba. He then dispatched his general Chavand Rai to Kalinjar Fort to capture Paramardi. According to the various legends, Paramardi either died or retired shortly after the attack. Prithviraj returned to Delhi after appointing Pajjun Rai as the governor of Mahoba. Later, Paramardi's son recaptured Mahoba.

The exact historicity of this legendary narrative is debatable. The Madanpur inscriptions establish that Prithviraj sacked Mahoba, but historical evidence suggests that his occupation of Chandela territory is either a fabrication by the bards, or did not last long. It is known that Paramardi did not die or retire immediately after the Chauhan victory; in fact, he continued ruling as a sovereign nearly a decade after Prithviraj's death. Cynthia Talbot asserts that Prithviraj only raided Jejakabhukti, and Paramardi regained control of his kingdom soon after his departure from Mahoba. Talbot continues that Prithviraj was not able to annex the Chandela territory to his kingdom. Conversely, according to R.B. Singh, it is probable that some part of Chandela territory was annexed by Chahmanas albeit for a short time.

=== Wars in Gujarat ===
The Kharatara-Gachchha-Pattavali mentions a peace treaty between Prithviraj, and Bhima II, the Chaulukya (Solanki) king of Gujarat. This implies that the two kings were previously at war. This war can be dated to sometime before 1187 CE (1244 VS). The Veraval inscription states that Bhima's prime minister Jagaddeva Pratihara was "the moon to the lotus-like queens of Prithviraja" (a reference to the belief that the moon-rise causes a day-blooming lotus to close its petals). Since Bhima was a minor at the time, it appears that Jagaddeva led the campaign on the Chaulukya side.

The historically unreliable Prithviraj Raso provides some details about the Chahamana-Chaulukya struggle. According to it, both Prithviraj and Bhima wanted to marry Ichchhini, the Paramara princess of Abu. Prithviraj's marriage to her led to a rivalry between the two kings. Historian G. H. Ojha dismisses this legend as fiction, because it states that Ichchhini was a daughter of Salakha, while Dharavarsha was the Paramara ruler of Abu at the time. Historian R. B. Singh, on the other hand, believes that Salakha was the head of another Paramara branch at Abu. The Raso also mentions that Prithviraj's uncle Kanhadeva had killed seven sons of Bhima's uncle Sarangadeva. To avenge these murders, Bhima invaded the Chahamana kingdom and killed Prithviraj's father Someshvara, capturing Nagor in the process. Prithviraj re-captured Nagor, and defeated and killed Bhima. This is known to be historically false, as the reign of Bhima II lasted nearly half a century after Prithviraj's death. Similarly, historical evidence suggests Bhima II was a child at the time of Someshvara's death, and therefore, could not have killed him.

Despite these discrepancies, there is some evidence of a battle between the Chahamanas and the Chaulukyas at Nagor. Two inscriptions found at Charlu village near Bikaner commemorate the death of Mohil soldiers at the battle of Nagor in 1184 CE (1241 VS). The Mohils are a branch of the Chauhans (the Chahamanas), and it is possible the inscriptions refer to the battle described in Prithviraj Raso.

Sometime before 1187 CE, Jagaddeva Pratihara signed a peace treaty with Prithviraj. According to Kharatara-Gachchha-Pattavali, a chief named Abhayada once sought Jagaddeva's permission to attack and rob the wealthy visitors from Sapadalaksha country (the Chahamana territory). In response, Jagaddeva told Abhayada that he had concluded a treaty with Prithviraj with much difficulty. Jaggadeva then threatened to have Abhayada sewn in a donkey's belly if he harassed the people of Sapadalaksha. Historian Dasharatha Sharma theorizes that the Chahamana-Chaulukya conflict ended with some advantage for Prithviraj, as Jagaddeva appears to have been very anxious to preserve the treaty. According to historian R.C. Majumdar and Satish Chandra his long drawn out struggle against Gujarat was unsuccessful and he suffered a reverse against Bhima. Thus, Prithviraj concluded a treaty by 1187 CE.

==== Paramaras ====
The area around Mount Abu was ruled by the Chandravati Paramara ruler Dharavarsha, who was a Chaulukya feudatory. Partha-Parakrama-Vyayoga, a text written by his younger brother Prahaladana, describes Prithviraj's night attack on Abu. This attack, according to the text, was a failure for the Chahamanas. It probably happened during the Gujarat campaign of Prithviraj.

=== Gahadavala conflict ===
The Gahadavala kingdom, centered around Kannauj and headed by another powerful king Jayachandra, was located to the east of the Chahamana kingdom. According to a legend mentioned in Prithviraj Raso, Prithviraj eloped with Jayachandra's daughter Samyogita, leading to a rivalry between the two kings.

The legend goes like this: King Jaichand (Jayachandra) of Kannauj decided to conduct a Rajasuya ceremony to proclaim his supremacy. Prithviraj refused to participate in this ceremony, and thus, refused to acknowledge Jaichand as the supreme king. Jaichand's daughter Samyogita fell in love with Prithviraj after hearing about his heroic exploits, and declared that she would marry only him. Jaichand arranged a swayamvara (husband-selection) ceremony for his daughter, but did not invite Prithviraj. Nevertheless, Prithviraj marched to Kannauj with a hundred warriors and eloped with Samyogita. Two-thirds of his warriors sacrificed their life in fight against the Gahadavala army, allowing him to escape to Delhi with Samyogita. In Delhi, Prithviraj became infatuated with his new wife, and started spending most of his time with her. He started ignoring the state affairs, which ultimately led to his defeat against Muhammad of Ghor.

This legend is also mentioned in Abu'l-Fazl's Ain-i-Akbari and Chandrashekhara's Surjana-Charita (which names the Gahadavala princess as "Kantimati"). Prithviraja Vijaya mentions that Prithviraj fell in love with the incarnation of an apsara Tilottama, although he had never seen this woman and was already married to other women. According to historian Dasharatha Sharma, this is probably a reference to Samyogita. However, this legend is not mentioned in other historical sources such as Prithviraja-Prabandha, Prabandha-Chintamani, Prabandha-Kosha and Hammira-Mahakavya. The Gahadavala records are also silent about this event, including the supposed Rajasuya performance by Jayachandra.

According to Dasharatha Sharma and R. B. Singh, there might be some historical truth in this legend, as it is mentioned in three different sources. All three sources place the event sometime before Prithviraj's final confrontation with Muhammad of Ghor in 1192 CE.

=== Other rulers ===
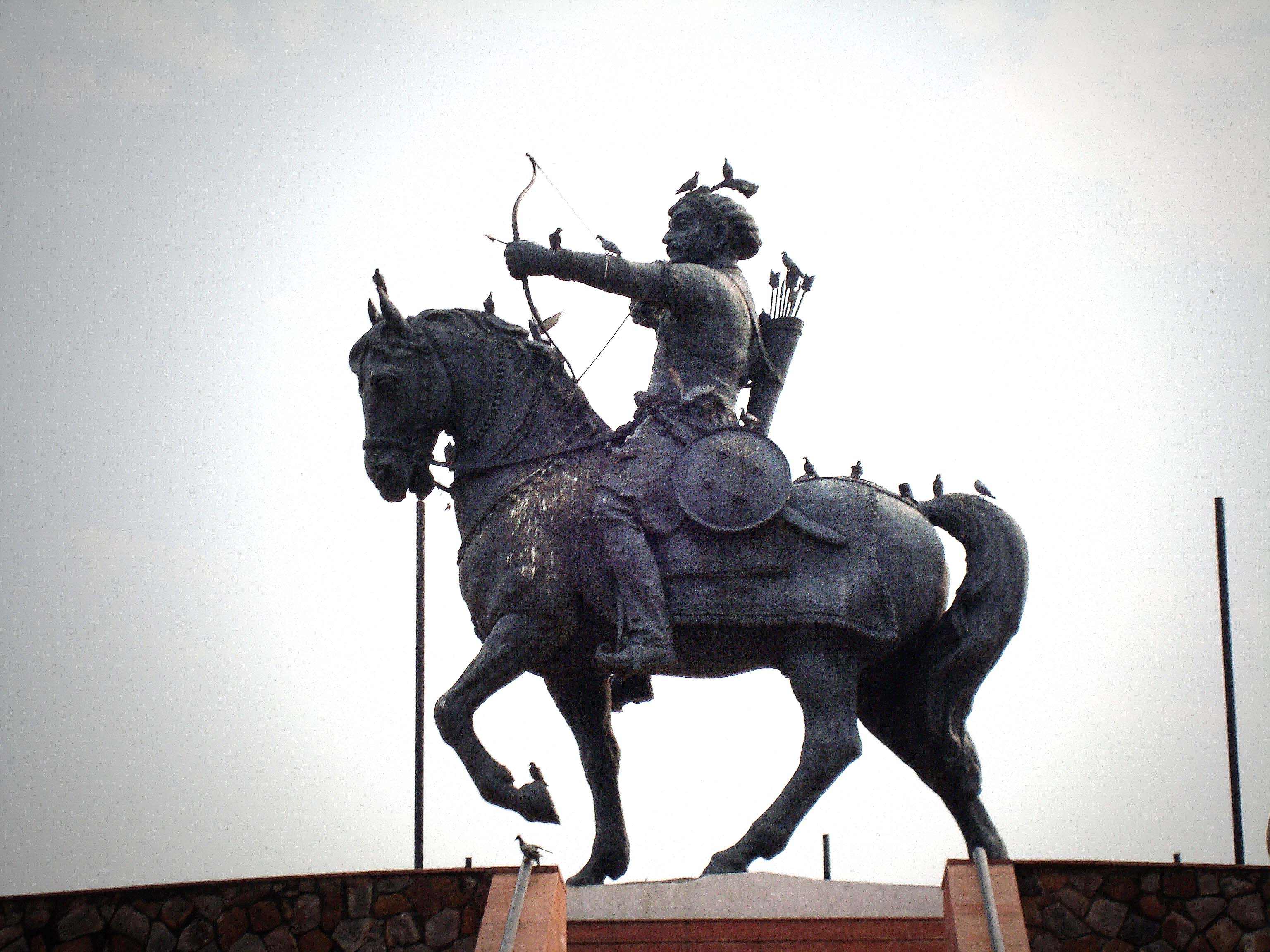
A statue at Qila Rai Pithora in Delhi

The Prithviraj Raso mentions that Prithviraj defeated Nahar Rai of Mandovara and the Mughal chief Mudgala Rai, but these stories appear to be pure fiction. No historical records suggest existence of these persons.

The construction of the now-ruined Qila Rai Pithora fort in Delhi is attributed to Prithviraj. According to Prithviraj Raso, Delhi's ruler Anangpal Tomar gave the city to his son-in-law Prithviraj, and was defeated when he wanted it back. This is historically inaccurate, as Delhi was annexed to the Chahamana territory by Prithviraj's uncle Vigraharaja IV. In addition, historical evidence suggests that Anangpal Tomar died before the birth of Prithviraj. The claim about his daughter's marriage to Prithviraj appears to have been concocted at a later date.

=== War with the Ghurids ===
Prithviraj's predecessors had faced multiple raids from the Muslim dynasties that had captured the north-western areas of the Indian subcontinent by the 12th century. By the late 12th century, the Ghazna-based Ghurid dynasty controlled the territory to the west of the Chahamana kingdom. While Prithviraj was still a child, in 1175 CE, the Ghurid ruler Muhammad of Ghor crossed the Indus River and captured Multan. In 1178 CE, he invaded Gujarat, which was ruled by the Chaulukyas (Solankis). During its march to Gujarat, the Ghurid army appears to have passed through the western frontier of the Chahamana kingdom, as evident by the destruction of several temples and sacking of the Bhati-ruled Lodhruva. The Prithviraja Vijaya mentions that the activities of the Ghurid army were like Rahu to the Chahamana kingdom (in Hindu mythology, Rahu swallows the Sun, causing a solar eclipse). However, it does not mention any military engagement between the two kingdoms. On its way to Gujarat, the Ghurid army besieged the Naddula (Nadol) fort, which was controlled by the Chahamanas of Naddula. Prithviraj's chief minister Kadambavasa advised him not to offer any assistance to the rivals of the Ghurids, and to stay away from this conflict. The Chahamanas did not immediately face a Ghurid invasion, because the Chaulukyas of Gujarat defeated Muhammad at the Battle of Kasahrada in 1178 CE, forcing the Ghurids to retreat.

Over the next few years, Muhammad of Ghor consolidated his power in the territory to the west of the Chahamanas, conquering Peshawar, Sindh, and Punjab. He shifted his base from Ghazna to Punjab, and made attempts to expand his empire eastwards, which brought him into conflict with Prithviraj.

Prithviraja Vijaya mentions that Muhammad of Ghor sent an ambassador to Prithviraj, but does not provide any details. Hasan Nizami's Taj-ul-Maasir (13th century CE) states that Muhammad sent his chief judge Qiwam-ul Mulk Ruknud Din Hamza to Prithviraj's court. The envoy tried to convince Prithviraj to "abandon belligerence and pursue the path of rectitude", but was unsuccessful. As a result, Muhammad decided to wage a war against Prithviraj.

The medieval Muslim writers mention only one or two battles between the two rulers. The Tabaqat-i Nasiri and Tarikh-i-Firishta mention the two Battles of Tarain. Jami-ul-Hikaya and Taj-ul-Maasir mention only the second battle of Tarain, in which Prithviraj was defeated. However, the Hindu and Jain writers state that Prithviraj defeated Muhammad multiple times before being killed:

- The Hammira Mahakavya claims that after defeating Muhammad for the first time, Prithviraj forced him to apologize to the princes whose territories he had ransacked, before letting him go. Muhammad invaded the Chahamana kingdom seven more times, but was defeated each time. However, his ninth invasion succeeded.
- The Prithviraja Prabandha states that the two kings fought 8 battles; Prithviraj defeated and captured the Ghurid king in the first seven of these, but released him unharmed each time.
- The Prabandha Kosha claims that Prithviraj captured Muhammad 20 times, but was himself imprisoned during the 21st battle. The Surjana Charita and Prithviraj Raso also enumerate 21 battles.
- The Prabandha Chintamani gives the number of battles between Muhammad and Prithviraj as 22. It also states that Prithviraj's army defeated the preceding enemy king in a previous battle, in which a subordinate of Prithviraj heroically sacrificed himself.

While these accounts seem to exaggerate the number, it is possible that more than two engagements took place between the Ghurids and the Chahamanas during Prithviraj's reign. The early victories mentioned by the Hindu and Jain writers probably refer to Prithviraj's successful repulsion of raids by Ghurid generals.

==== First battle of Tarain ====
During 1190–1191 CE, Muhammad of Ghor invaded the Chahamana territory, and captured Tabarhindah or Tabar-e-Hind (identified with Bathinda). He placed it under the charge of Zia-ud-din, the Qazi of Tulak, supported by 1200 horsemen. When Prithviraj learned about this, marched towards Tabarhindah with his feudatories, including Govindaraja of Delhi. According to the 16th-century Muslim historian Firishta, his force comprised 200,000 horses and 3,000 elephants.

Muhammad's original plan was to return to his base after conquering Tabarhindah, but when he heard about Prithviraj's march, he decided to put up a fight. He set out with an army, and encountered Prithviraj's forces at Tarain. In the ensuing battle, Prithviraj's army decisively defeated the Ghurids. Muhammad of Ghor was injured and forced to retreat.

Prithviraj did not pursue the retreating Ghurid army, not wanting to invade hostile territory or misjudge Ghori's ambition. He only besieged the Ghurid garrison at Tabarhindah, which surrendered after 13 months of siege.

==== Second battle of Tarain ====
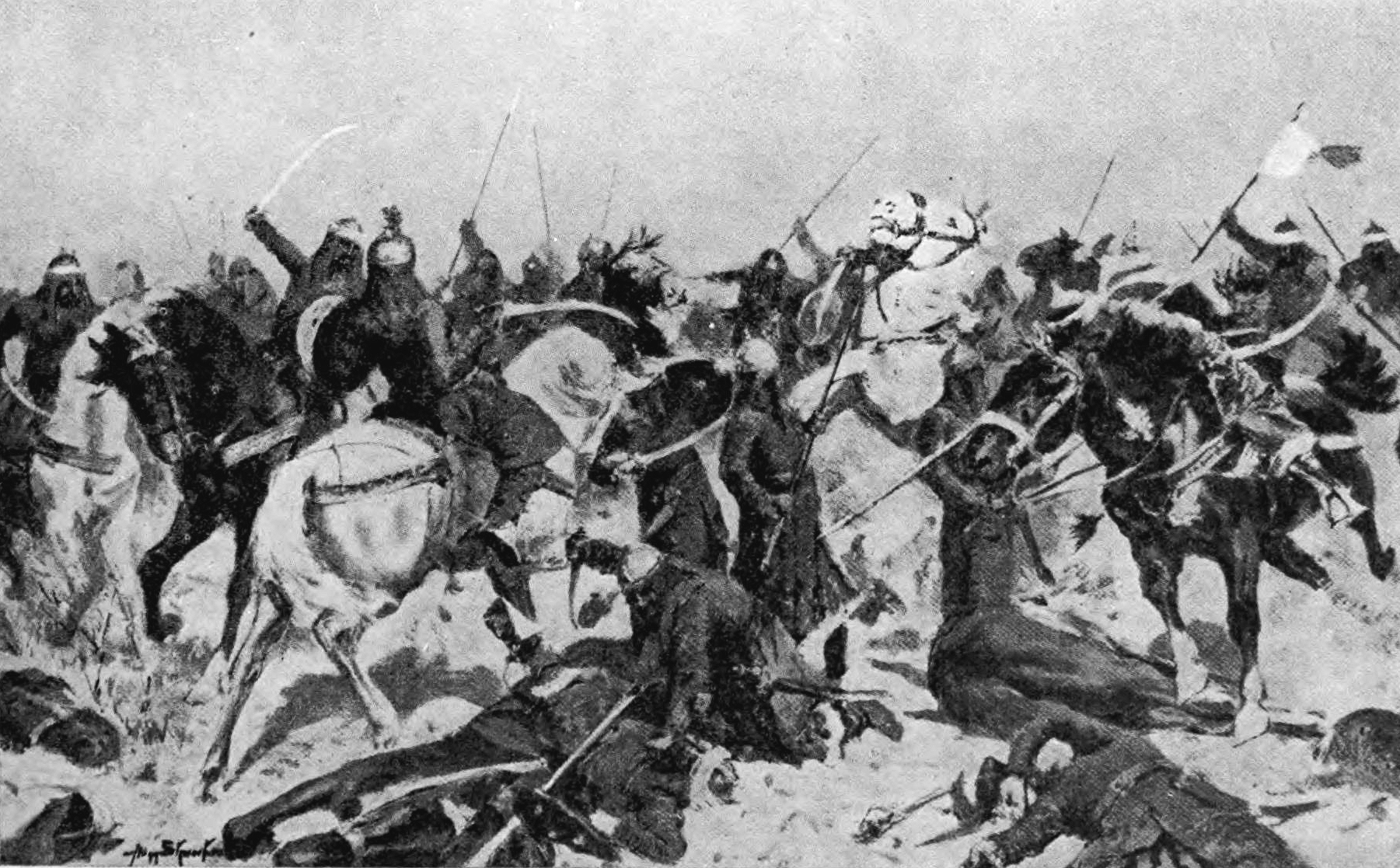
The last stand of Rajputs, depicting the Second Battle of Tarain by Hutchinson & co

Prithviraj seems to have treated the first battle of Tarain as merely a frontier fight. This view is strengthened by the fact that he made little preparations for any future clash with Muhammad of Ghor. According to Prithviraj Raso, during the period preceding his final confrontation with the Ghurids, he neglected the affairs of the state and spent time in merry-making.

Meanwhile, Muhammad of Ghor returned to Ghazna, and made preparations to avenge his defeat. According to Tabaqat-i Nasiri, he gathered a well-equipped army of 120,000 select Afghan, Tajik and Turkic horsemen over the next few months. He then marched towards the Chahamana kingdom via Multan and Lahore, aided by Vijayaraja of Jammu.

Prithviraj had been left without any allies as a result of his wars against the neighbouring Hindu kings. Nevertheless, he managed to gather a large army to counter the Ghurids. Prithviraj successfully marshaled a sizeable army composed of over 100 Rajput rulers, mainly War elephants, cavalrymen and foot soldiers. The 16th century Muslim historian Firishta estimated the strength of Prithviraj's army as 300,000 horses and 3,000 elephants, in addition to a large infantry. This is most likely a gross exaggeration, aimed at emphasizing the scale of the Ghurid victory. Prithviraj wrote a letter to Muhammad of Ghor, promising him no harm if he decided to return to his own country. Muhammad insisted that he needed time to confer his brother Ghiyath al-Din who was ruling from his capital at Firozkoh. According to Firishta, he agreed to a truce until he received an answer from his brother. However, he planned an attack against the Chahamanas.

According to Jawami ul-Hikayat, Muhammad assigned a few men to keep the fires in his camp burning at night, while he marched off in another direction with the rest of his army. This gave the Chahamanas an impression that the Ghurid army was still encamped, observing the truce. After reaching several miles away, Muhammad formed four divisions, with 10,000 archers each. He kept the rest of his army in reserve. He ordered the four divisions to launch an attack on the Chahamana camp, and then pretend a retreat.

At dawn, the four divisions of the Ghurid army attacked the Chahamana camp, while Prithviraj was still asleep. After a brief fight, the Ghurid divisions pretended to retreat in accordance with Muhammad's strategy. Prithviraj was thus lured into chasing them, and by the afternoon, the Chahamana army was exhausted as a result of this pursuit. At this point, Muhammad led his reserve force of 10,000 mounted archers and attacked the Chahamanas, decisively defeating them. Chronicler Juzjani attributed the success of the Ghurid army to the 10,000 mounted archers which eventually overthrow the "infidel host". However, scholars like Dashratha Sharma and R.B. Singh argue that Ghoris' triumph was more a result of deceitful and treacherous strategies rather than the inherent strength of his forces. According to Taj-ul-Maasir, Prithviraj's camp lost 100,000 men (including Govindaraja of Delhi) in this debacle. Prithviraj himself tried to escape on a horse, but was pursued and caught near the Sarasvati fort (possibly modern Sirsa). Subsequently, Muhammad of Ghor captured Ajmer after killing several thousand defenders, enslaved many more, and destroyed the city's temples.

==== Jain accounts of Prithviraj's downfall ====
Prabandha Chintamani by the 14th-century Jain scholar Merutunga states that Prithviraj cut off the ears of one of his ministers, who guided the Ghurid invaders to his camp as revenge. Prithviraj was in deep sleep after a day of religious fasting, and therefore, was easily captured.

Hammira Mahakavya by the 15th-century Jain scholar Nayachandra Suri states that after his initial defeat, the Ghurid king raised a fresh army with the support of a neighboring king, and marched to Delhi. Before the battle, he bribed Prithviraj's master of horses and musicians with gold coins. The master of horses had trained Prithviraj's horse to prance to drumbeats. The Ghurids attacked the Chahamana camp just before dawn, when Prithviraj was sleeping. Prithviraj tried to escape on his horse, but his musicians sounded the drums. The horse started prancing, and the invaders easily captured Prithviraj.

According to another Jain text, Prithviraja Prabandha, Prithviraj's minister Kaimbasa and his spear-bearer Pratapasimha were not on good terms. Kaimbasa once complained to king against Pratapasimha, who convinced the king that Kaimbasa was aiding the Ghurids. An angry Prithviraj attempted to kill Kaimbasa with an arrow one night, but ended up killing another man. When his bard Chand Baliddika admonished him, the king dismissed both the bard and the minister. At the time of Ghurid invasion of Delhi, Prithviraj had been sleeping for ten days. When the Ghurids came close, his sister woke him up: Prithviraj tried to flee on a horse, but Kaimbasa helped the Ghurids capture him by telling them about a certain sound that caused his horse to prance.

== Death and succession ==
Billon Jital coin of Prithviraj Chauhan

Most medieval sources state that Prithviraj was taken to the Chahamana capital Ajmer, where Muhammad planned to reinstate him as a Ghurid vassal. Sometime later, Prithviraj rebelled against Muhammad, and was killed for treason. This is corroborated by numismatic evidence: some 'horse-and-bullman'-style coins bearing names of both Prithviraj and "Muhammad bin Sam" were issued from the Delhi mint, although another possibility is that the Ghurids initially used Chahamana-style coinage to ensure greater acceptance of their own coinage in the former Chahamana territory. After Prithviraj's death, Muhammad installed the Chahamana prince Govindaraja on the throne of Ajmer, which further supports this theory.

The various sources differ on the exact circumstances:

- The contemporary Muslim historian Hasan Nizami states that Prithviraj was caught conspiring against Muhammad, prompting the Ghurid king to order his beheading. Nizami does not describe the nature of this conspiracy.
- According to Prabandha Chintamani (c. 1304), Muhammad took him to Ajmer, intending to let him rule as a vassal. However, in Ajmer, he saw paintings depicting Muslims being killed by pigs in the Chahamana gallery. Enraged, he beheaded Prithviraj with an axe.
- Hammira Mahakavya states that Prithviraj refused to eat food after being captured. The noblemen of the Ghurid king suggested that he release Prithviraj, but Muhammad ignored their advice, and Prithviraj died in captivity.
- Prithviraja-Prabandha (dated 15th century or earlier) states the Ghurids placed Prithviraj in gold chains and brought him to Delhi. Prithviraj reproached the Ghurid king for not following his example of releasing the captured enemy. Some days later, while imprisoned in Ajmer, Prithviraj asked his ex-minister Kaimbasa for his bow-and-arrows to kill Muhammad in the court, which was held in front of the house where he was imprisoned. The treacherous minister supplied him the bow-and-arrows, but secretly informed Muhammad of his plan. As a result, Muhammad did not sit at his usual place, and instead kept a metal statue there. Prithviraj fired an arrow at the statue, breaking it into two. As a punishment, Muhammad had him cast into a pit and stoned to death.

The 13th-century Persian historian Minhaj-i-Siraj states that Prithviraj was "sent to hell" after being captured. The 16th-century historian Firishta also supports this account. According to historian Satish Chandra, Minhaj's account suggests that Prithviraj was executed immediately after his defeat, but R. B. Singh believes that no such conclusion can be drawn from Minhaj's writings. Viruddha-Vidhi Vidhvansa by the Hindu writer Lakshmidhara is the only source that claims that Prithviraj was killed on the battlefield.

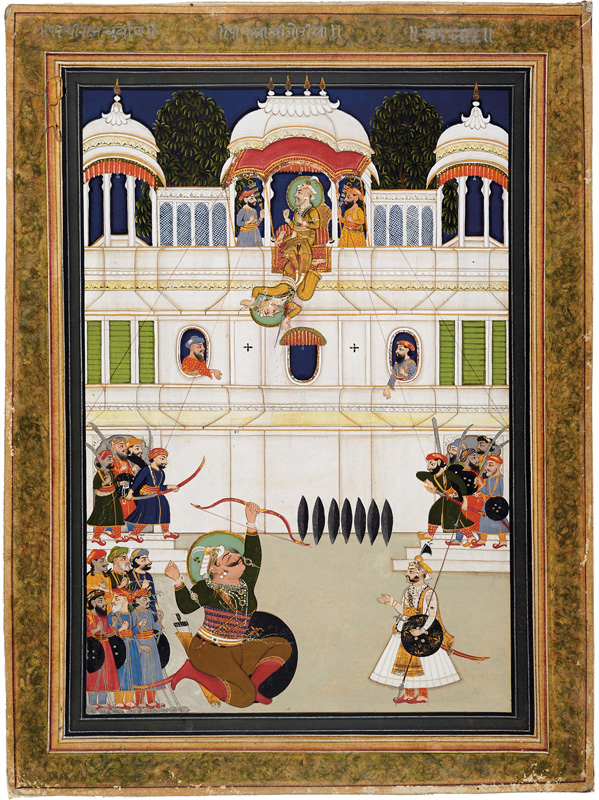
Fictional Painting of Prithviraj Chauhan shooting Muhammad of Ghor, attributed to the court painter Tara, Mewar, ca.1860

The Prithviraj Raso claims that Prithviraj was taken to Ghazna as a prisoner, and blinded. On hearing this, the poet Chand Bardai traveled to Ghazna and tricked Muhammad of Ghor into watching an archery performance by the blind Prithviraj. During this performance, Prithviraj shot the arrow in the direction of Muhammad's voice and killed him. Shortly after, Prithviraj and Chand Bardai killed each other. This is a fictional narrative, not supported by historical evidence: Muhammad of Ghor continued to rule for more than a decade after Prithviraj's death.

After Prithviraj's death, the Ghurids appointed his son Govindaraja on the throne of Ajmer as their vassal. In 1192 CE, Prithviraj's younger brother Hariraja dethroned Govindaraja, and recaptured a part of his ancestral kingdom. Govindaraja moved to Ranastambhapura (modern Ranthambore), where he established a new Chahamana branch of vassal rulers. Hariraja was later defeated by the Ghurid general Qutb al-Din Aibak.

== Cultural activities ==
Prithviraj had a dedicated ministry for pandits (scholars) and poets, which was under the charge of Padmanabha. His court had a number of poets and scholars, including:

- Jayanaka, a poet-historian who wrote Prithviraja Vijaya
- Vidyapati Gauda
- Vagisvara Janardana
- Vishvarupa, a poet
- Prithvibhata, a royal bard (identified as Chand Bardai by some scholars)

Kharatara-Gachchha-Pattavali mentions a debate that took place between the Jain monks Jinapati Suri and Padmaprabha at Naranayana (modern Narena near Ajmer). Prithviraj had encamped there at the time. Jinapati was later invited to Ajmer by a rich Jain merchant. There, Prithviraj issued him a jaya-patra (certificate of victory).

== Legacy ==
=== Inscriptions ===
Find-spots of inscriptions from Prithviraj's reign, in present-day India

According to historian R. B. Singh, at its height, Prithviraj's empire extended from Sutlej river in the west to the Betwa river in the east, and from the Himalayan foothills in the north to the foot of Mount Abu in the south. Thus, it included parts of present-day Rajasthan, Uttrakhand, southern Punjab, northern Madhya Pradesh, Himachal Pradesh and western Uttar Pradesh.

However, according to archeologist Rima Hooja and historian R.C. Majumdar, Prithviraj inherited a kingdom that only stretched till modern day Hissar and Sirhind (Bathinda) on north west, and till Delhi in North. His territories were bounded on southern frontier by Guhilas of Mewar along with Chauhans of Nadol, on the eastern border by kingdoms of Bayana, Kachchhapaghatas of Gwalior and Gahadavalas of Varnasi and on north-west frontier by empire of the Ghaznavids. Majumdar further asserts that the military campaigns of Prithviraj on his neighbours do not resulted in any annexation of territory.

Only seven inscriptions dated to Prithviraj's reign are available; none of these were issued by the king himself:

- Barla or Badla inscription, 1177 CE (1234 VS)
- Phalodi inscription, 1179 CE (1236 VS): records the grants made by Prithviraj's vassal Ranaka Katiya.
- Madanpur inscriptions of 1182 CE (1239 VS)
  - Inscription 1: Mentions that Prithviraj invaded the territory of the Chandela ruler Paramardi
  - Inscription 2: Names Prithviraj's father (Someshvara) and grandfather (Arnoraja), and states that he plundered Jejakabhukti (the Chandela territory)
  - Inscription 3: Contains names of Shiva (Tryambaka, Chandrashekhara, and Tripuranta).
- Udaipur Victoria Hall Museum inscription, 1187 CE (1244 VS)
- Visalpur (Bisalpur near Tonk) inscription, 1187 CE (1244 VS)

=== Characterization ===
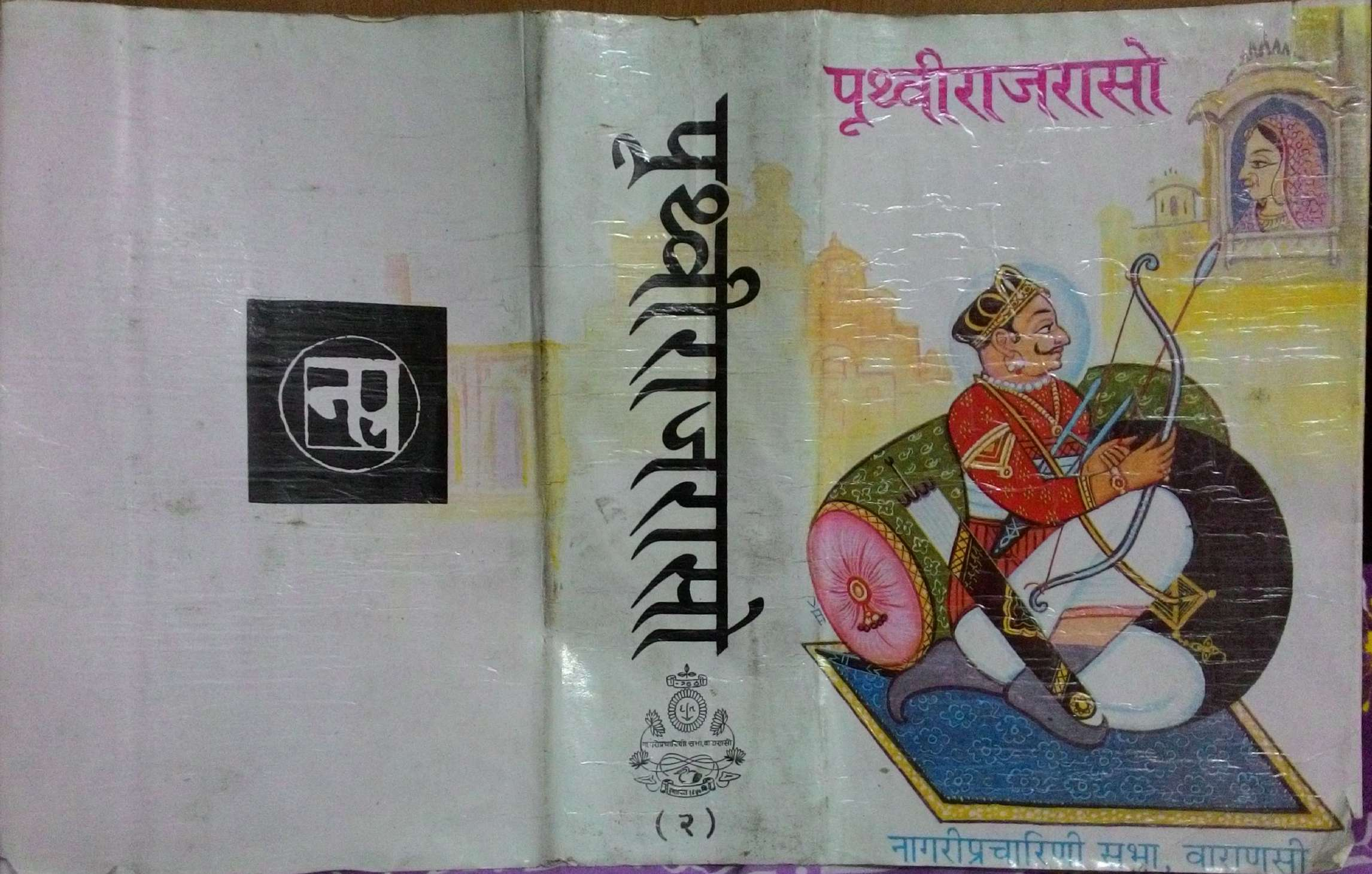
The cover of a Prithviraj Raso version published by the Nagari Pracharini Sabha

The late medieval (14th and 15th centuries) Sanskrit stories about Prithviraj present him as an unsuccessful king who was memorable only for his defeat against a foreign king. Prabandha-Chintamani and Prithviraja-Prabandha, written by Jain authors, portray him as an inept and unworthy king who was responsible for his own downfall, and whose mistreatment of his devout subordinates turned them into traitors. In contrast, the Hammira Mahakavya, also written by a Jain author, presents him as a brave man whose subordinates turned against him out of pure greed. The Hammira Mahakavya, which was probably intended to please a Chauhan lord, retains the elements of the Jain tradition that occur in the two Prabandha texts, but also attempts to glorify Prithviraj who was an ancestor of the text's hero Hammira.

Prithviraj Raso, a legendary text patronized largely by the Rajput courts, portrays Prithviraj as a great hero. Over time, Prithviraj came to be portrayed as a patriotic Hindu warrior who fought against Muslim enemies. He is remembered as a king whose reign separated the two major epochs of Indian history. The convention of portraying Prithviraj as a Hindu king defeated as part of the Islamic conquest of India appears to have started with Hasan Nizami's Tajul-Ma'asir (early 13th century). Nizami presents his narrative as a description of "war with enemies of the faith" and of how "the Islamic way of life was established in the land of the Hindus." Tajul-Ma'asir as well as the later text Tabaqat-i Nasiri (c. 1260) present the Ghurid victory over Prithviraj as an important milestone leading to the establishment of the Delhi Sultanate.

The 16th century legends describe him as the ruler of India's political centre Delhi (rather than Ajmer, which was his actual capital). For example, Abul Fazl's Ain-i-Akbari does not associate the Chahamana dynasty with Ajmer at all. Prithviraj's association with Delhi in these legends further strengthened his status as a symbol of pre-Islamic Indian power.

Prithviraj has been described as "the last Hindu emperor" in eulogies. This designation is inaccurate, as several stronger Hindu rulers flourished in South India after him, and even some contemporary Hindu rulers in northern India were at least as powerful as him. Nevertheless, the 19th-century British officer James Tod repeatedly used this term to describe Prithviraj in his Annals and Antiquities of Rajast'han. Tod was influenced by the medieval Persian language Muslim accounts, which present Prithviraj as a major ruler and portray his defeat as a major milestone in the Islamic conquest of India. After Tod, several narratives continued to describe Prithviraj as "the last Hindu emperor". For example, the inscriptions at the Ajmer memorial (smarak) to Prithviraj also honour him as "the last Hindu emperor".

== In popular culture ==
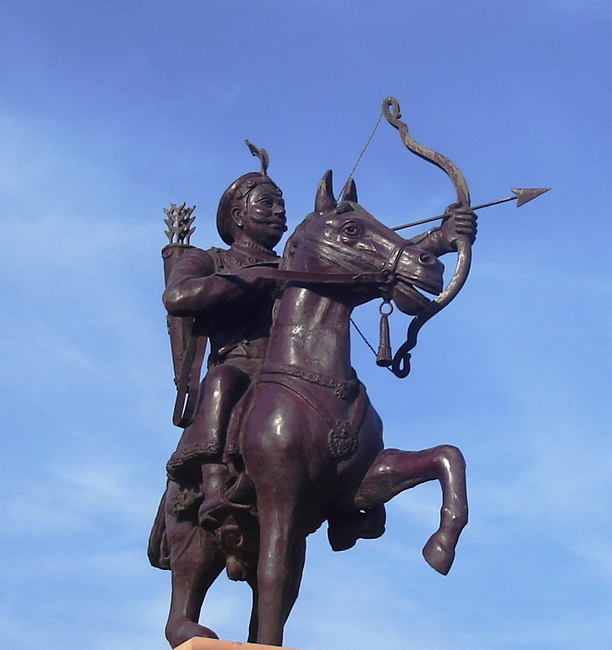
Statue of Prithviraj Chauhan at Ajmer

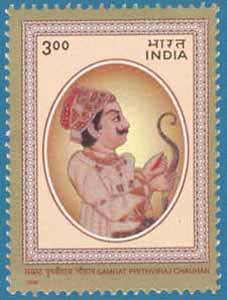
Prithviraj Chauhan featureing on Indian Postage stamp, 2000

Memorials dedicated to Prithviraj have been constructed in Ajmer and Delhi. A number of Indian films and television series have been made on his life. These include: Prithviraj Chouhan (1924), Prithviraj Sanyogita (1929) by Narayanrao D. Sarpotdar, Prithviraj (1931) by R. N. Vaidya, Prithviraj Sanyogita (1933), Prithivirajan (1942) by B. Sampathkumar, Prithviraj Samyogita (1946) by Najam Naqvi, Samrat Prithviraj Chauhan (1959) by Harsukh Jagneshwar Bhatt, Rani Samyuktha (1962) by D. Yoganand, Samrat Prithviraj (2022) by Chandraprakash Dwivedi; and the Hindi television serials Main Dilli Hoon (1998–1999), Dharti Ka Veer Yodha Prithviraj Chauhan (2006–2009), and Chakravarti Samrat Prithviraj Chauhan (2025).

The Indian animated film Veer Yodha Prithviraj Chauhan (2008) was released by Rakesh Prasad. Prithviraj was also one of the first historical figures to be covered in Amar Chitra Katha (No. 25). Many of these modern retellings depict Prithviraj as a flawless hero, and emphasize a message of Hindu national unity.

The video game Age of Empires II HD: The Forgotten contains a five-chapter campaign titled "Prithviraj".
