= Rani Samyuktha =

- Theatrical release poster
- Directed by: D. Yoganand
- Written by: Kannadasan
- Produced by: A. C. Pillai
- Starring: M. G. Ramachandran; Padmini
- Cinematography: P. L. Roy
- Edited by: M. S. Mani; C. P. Jambulingam; D. Durairajan; Vasu
- Music by: K. V. Mahadevan
- Production company: Saraswathy Pictures
- Release date: 14 January 1962
- Running time: 167 minutes
- Country: India
- Language: Tamil

Rani Samyuktha (transl. Queen Samyuktha) is a 1962 Indian Tamil-language historical romance film directed by D. Yoganand and written by Kannadasan. The film stars M. G. Ramachandran as Prithviraj Chauhan and Padmini as the eponymous queen. It was released on 14 January 1962, and performed averagely.

== Plot ==
Prithvirajan falls in love when he sees a portrait of princess Samyuktha. To insult him, her father Jayachandran installs his statue at the entrance to the palace hall where the svayamvara (a ceremony to choose the bridegroom) by the princess is to take place. Getting wind of it, Prithvirajan rushes to the spot on a horse and carries away his sweetheart, while others present watch shocked and stunned.

== Cast ==
- M. G. Ramachandran as Prithviraj Chauhan
- Padmini as Rani Samyuktha
- M. N. Nambiar as Muhammad Ghori (guest appearance)
- Ragini as Amrawathi
- K. A. Thangavelu
- M. G. Chakrapani as Shankaroy
- M. N. Rajam as Bhawani
- M. Saroja
- S. V. Sahasranamam as Jaichandra

== Production ==
The story of Samyukta and Prithviraj Chauhan, a popular love story, had been filmed several times in Indian cinema. In 1942, it was made in Tamil, titled Prithivirajan, with P. U. Chinnappa and A. Sakunthala starring. Rani Samyuktha, the 1962 edition of the same story, was produced by A. C. Pillai, then a small-time bank clerk.

== Soundtrack ==
The music was composed by K. V. Mahadevan, while the lyrics were written by Kannadasan.

Song	Singers	Length
"Nilavenna Pesum Kuyilenna Paadum"	T. M. Soundararajan & P. Susheela	02:46
"Chitthiratthil Pennezhudhi Seerpadutthum"	K. Jamuna Rani	03:13
"Idazh Irandum Paadattum"	T. M. Soundararajan & T. S. Bagavathi	03:14
"Nenjirukkum Varaikkum Ninaivirukkum"	P. Susheela	02:55
"Oho Vennilaa O Vennilaa"	T. M. Soundararajan & P. Susheela	03:08
"Mannavar Kulam Paramma"	P. Susheela	04:01
"Mullaimalar Kaadu Engal Mananvan Ponnaadu"	A. P. Komala	03:42
"Paavai Unakku Seidhi Teriyumaa"	P. Susheela	3:09

== Release and reception ==
Rani Samyuktha was released on 14 January 1962, and performed averagely. Historian Randor Guy wrote in 2015 that there was a talk among Ramachandran's close friends that a misunderstanding arose between him and the producer and that somewhat affected his performance in the film.
