= Udal of Mahoba =

Legendary general in Alha-Khand

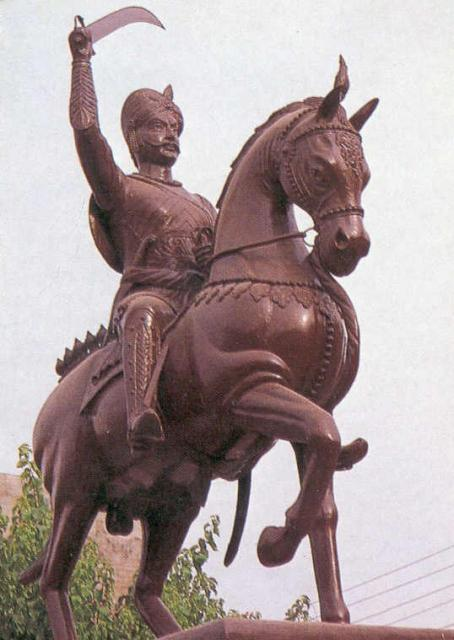
Veer Udal of Mahoba, U.P., India

Udal is the name of a legendary 12th century general who appears in the Alha-Khand epic. In the epic, Udal and his brother Alha serve in the army of the Chandela king Paramardi Deva (also known as Parmal or Parimal) of Mahoba. They belonged to the Banaphar clan, which are of Rajput and Ahir descent.

According to the Alha-Khand, Udal was born after the death of his father Dassraj, who was also a general, and was killed in the service of king Paramardi. The king subsequently raised Udal as his own son. The epic describes how Udal was killed while fighting the invading army of Rai Pithora, also known as Prithviraj Chauhan, in a large battle at Mahoba; while the content of the ballads has been embellished, the battle has been attested by stone inscriptions at Madanpur, and took place at some point in 1182-1183.
