= Samyukta =

Rajput queen

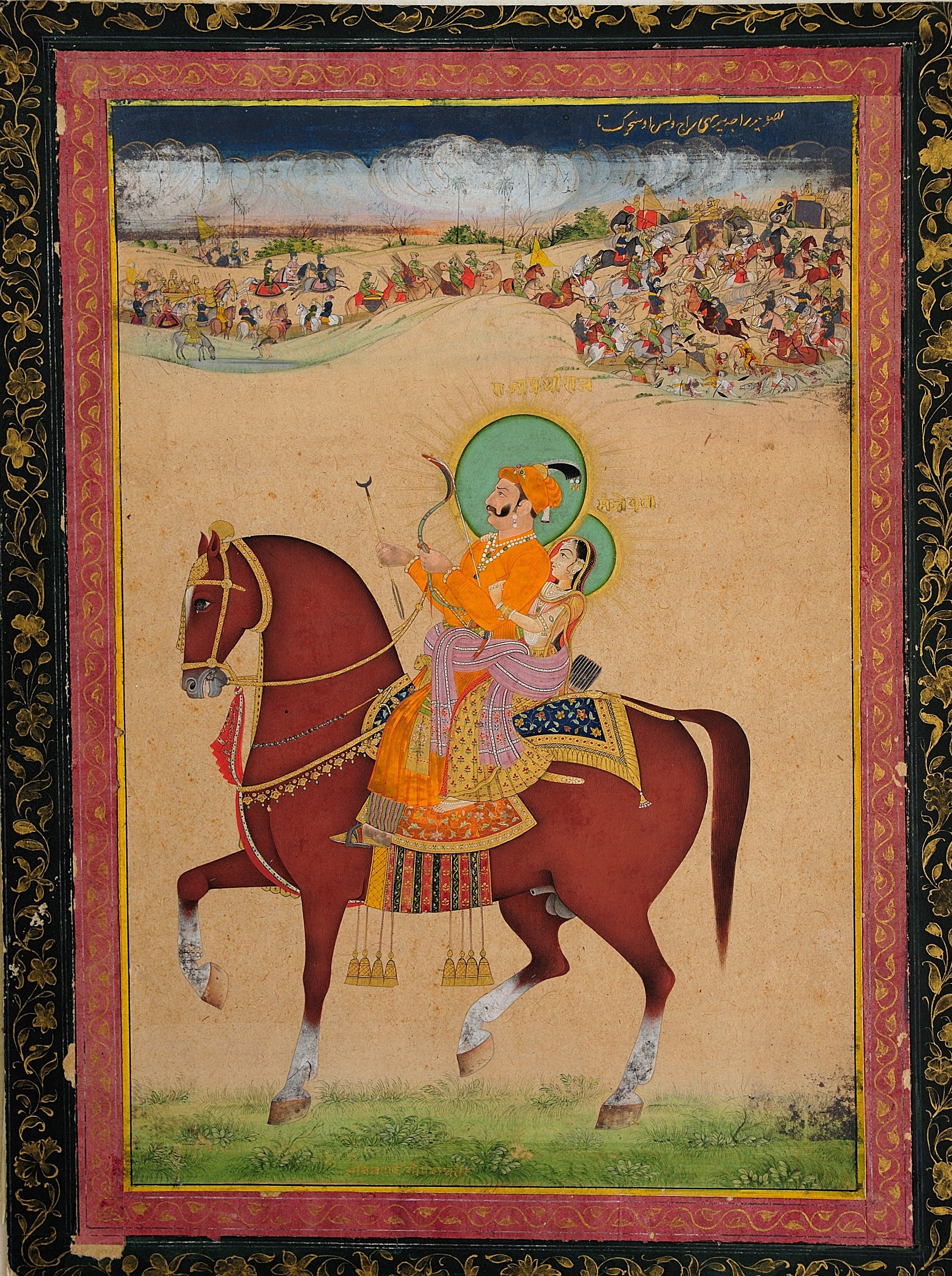
- Equestrian painting of Prithviraj Chauhan and Samyukta, Rajasthani School, circa 19th century
- Created by: Chand Bardai
- Based on: Prithviraj Raso

In-universe information
- Title: Princess of Kannauj
- Family: Gahadavala (by birth); Chahamanas (by marriage)
- Spouse: Prithviraj Chauhan
- Relatives: Jaichand (Father)
- Religion: Hinduism

Samyukta, also known as Sanyogita or Sanjukta, was the daughter of Jaichand, the King of Kannauj, and one of three wives of Prithviraj Chauhan. The love between Prithviraj and Samyukta is one of India's most popular medieval romances, composed by Chand Bardai in Prithviraj Raso.

== Legend ==
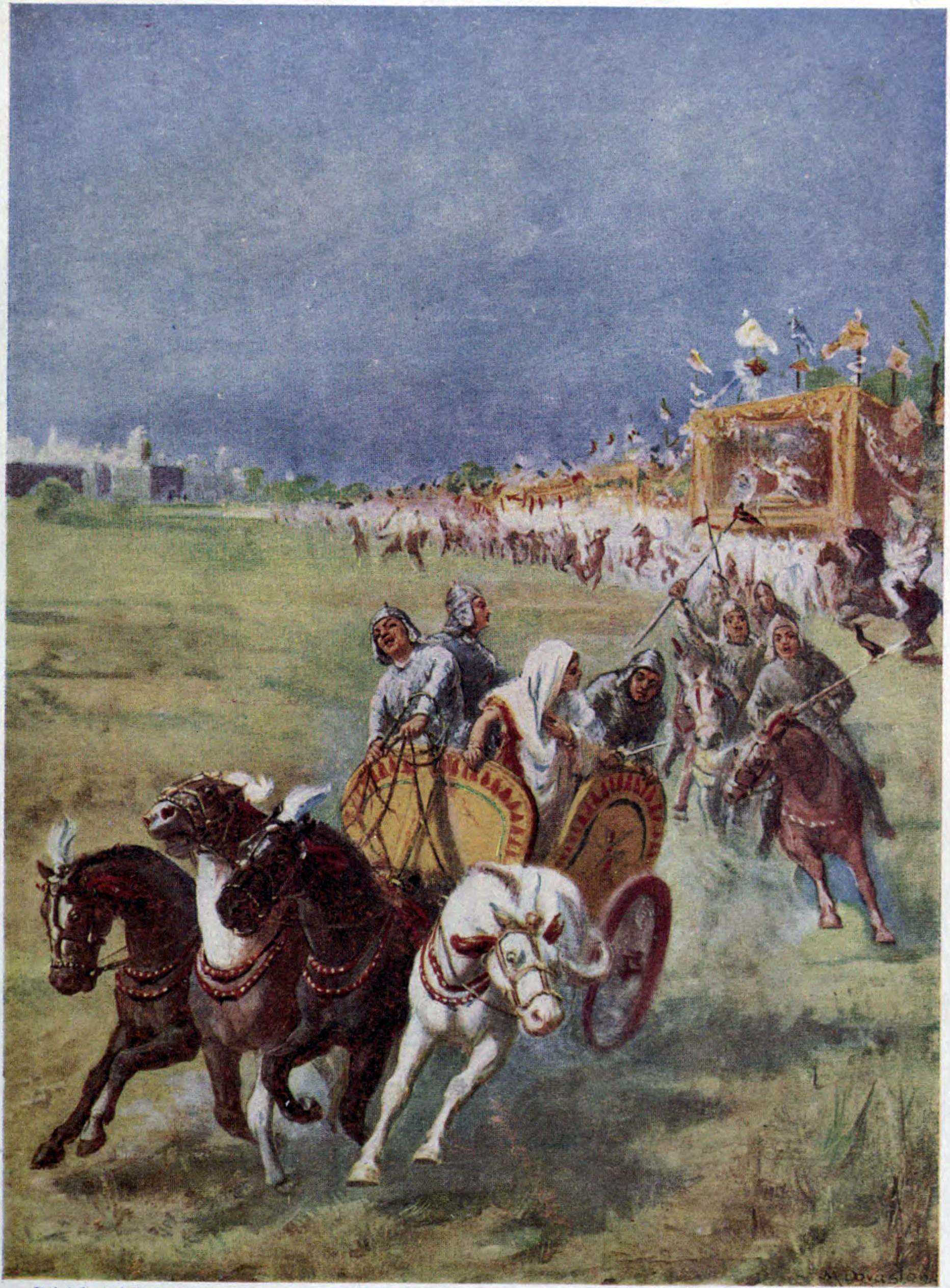
Saving Samyukta

At the peak of his reign, Prithviraj had annexed vast regions of India to his kingdom, and his fame had spread all across the subcontinent and to Afghanistan. Many lesser kings were envious and wary of his power, including Raja Jaichand of Kannauj. Jaichand's daughter, Samyukta, was a headstrong girl who was known for her bewitching beauty. She is said to have fallen in love with Prithviraj–like the two other princesses, Shashivrata and Padmavati, before her—as his reputation dazzled her. She desired nobody but him. For his part, Prithviraj had heard of Samyukta's loveliness and fell in love with her as well. However, Jaichand and Prithviraj were rivals.

On finding out about the affair, Raja Jaichand was outraged that a romance had been budding behind his back. Jaichand decided to insult Prithviraj and arranged a svayamvara for his daughter in 1185 CE. He invited royalty from far and wide to the ceremony, every eligible prince and king—except Prithviraj. He then commissioned a clay statue of Prithviraj, which served as a dvarapala (or, a figurative "doorman") to Jaichand's court. Prithviraj Chauhan, on hearing about the impending svayamvara, devised a plan to elope with the bride-to-be. On the day of the ceremony, Samyukta walked through the court holding the ceremonial garland, ignoring the gazes of her ardent suitors. She passed through the door and put the garland around the neck of Prithviraj's statue, declaring him her husband. Prithiviraj, who meanwhile was hiding behind the statue, caught Samyukta up in his arms, set her on his horse, and whisked her away to Delhi. Raja Jaichand was enraged. This led to a rift between Delhi and Kannauj, which was later taken advantage of by Mohammad Ghori of Afghanistan.

== Historicity ==
The historicity of Samyukta is a matter of debate. Prithviraj Raso is a historically unreliable text, having been embellished under the patronage of the Kshatriya rulers since the 16th century. However, some scholars such as Dasharatha Sharma believe that the more reliable Prithviraja Vijaya, which was composed during the reign of Prithviraj Chauhan, also contains a reference to Samyukta.

An unfinished theme in the 11th chapter of Prithviraja Vijaya refers to Prithviraj's love for an unnamed woman who lived on the banks of the Ganges river (just like Samyukta). This woman is mentioned as an incarnation of Tilottama, a legendary apsara (celestial nymph). However, even if this woman is same as Samyukta, there is no concrete evidence to support the Prithviraj Raso narrative of Samyuka's abduction and marriage to Prithviraj Chauhan.

== Modern Indian culture ==
"Samyukta", which means "united" in Sanskrit, is a popular girl's name in modern India. The life of Prithviraj Chauhan has also been the subject of a television show aired on Star Plus titled Dharti Ka Veer Yodha Prithviraj Chauhan, the character of Sanyogita was portrayed by Mugdha Chaphekar in that series. A historical film titled Raani Samyuktha was made in 1962 with Padmini and M. G. Ramachandran in the lead roles. In the 2022 film Samrat Prithviraj by Chandraprakash Dwivedi, the character of Sanyogita is portrayed by Manushi Chhillar. In the 2008 Indian animated film Veeryodha Prithviraj Chauhan, she was voiced by Mona Ghosh Shetty in both, English and Hindi.
