= Mahoba =

- City
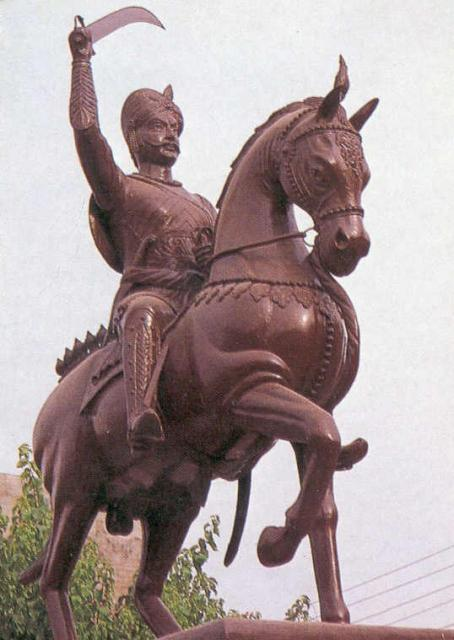
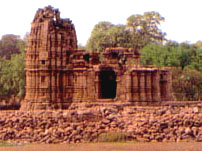
- Alha Udal Statue, Sun Temple, in Raheliya

- Location in Uttar Pradesh, India Mahoba (India)
- Coordinates: 25.28°N 79.872885°E
- Country: India
- State: Uttar Pradesh
- Region: Bundelkhand
- District: Mahoba

Government
  - Type: City council
  - Body: Mahoba Municipality
  - District magistrate: Gazal Bhardwaj
- Elevation: 214 m (702 ft)

Population (2011)
  - Total: 95,216

Language
  - Official: Hindi
  - Additional official: Urdu
- Time zone: UTC+5:30 (IST)
- PIN: 210 427
- Telephone code: 91-5281
- Vehicle registration: UP-95
- Sex ratio: 922 ♂/♀
- Literacy: 76.91%
- Website: mahoba.nic.in

Mahoba is a city in Mahoba District of the Indian state of Uttar Pradesh in the Bundelkhand region, well known for the ninth century granite Sun temple built in Pratihara style. It is also well known for the 24 rock-cut Jain tirthankara image on Gokhar hill. Mahoba is known for being the capital of Chandela dynasty and its closeness to Khajuraho, Lavkushnagar and other historic places like Kulpahar, Charkhari, Kalinjar, Orchha, and Jhansi. The town is connected with railways and state highways.

== History ==
Mahoba was a capital of Chandela dynasty that ruled much of Bundelkhand. The 12th century general Udal and his brother Alha were notable for fighting against Prithviraj Chauhan under Chandel king Paramardi.

== Geography ==
=== Topography ===
Mahoba is located at 25.28°N 79.87°E. It has an average elevation of 214 metres (702 feet).

=== Climate ===
Climate data for Mahoba, Uttar Pradesh
Month	Jan	Feb	Mar	Apr	May	Jun	Jul	Aug	Sep	Oct	Nov	Dec	Year
Mean daily maximum °C (°F)	24 (75)	28 (82)	33 (91)	39 (102)	42 (108)	39 (102)	33 (91)	32 (90)	33 (91)	33 (91)	30 (86)	36 (97)	42 (108)
Daily mean °C (°F)	16 (61)	20 (68)	25 (77)	31 (88)	35 (95)	33 (91)	29 (84)	29 (84)	29 (84)	27 (81)	22 (72)	18 (64)	28 (82)
Mean daily minimum °C (°F)	9 (48)	13 (55)	17 (63)	23 (73)	27 (81)	28 (82)	26 (79)	25 (77)	24 (75)	20 (68)	15 (59)	10 (50)	9 (48)
Average precipitation mm (inches)	3.9 (0.15)	10.9 (0.43)	12.1 (0.48)	7.6 (0.30)	5.4 (0.21)	69 (2.7)	166.3 (6.55)	184.5 (7.26)	89.4 (3.52)	37.2 (1.46)	11.4 (0.45)	3.7 (0.15)	601.4 (23.68)
Average precipitation days	1.8	1.5	1.4	1.1	1.4	3.3	8.8	9.4	4.1	1.2	0.6	0.9	35.5
Source: Time and Date

== Demographics ==
As of 2011 India census, Mahoba has a population of 95,216 divided into 25 wards. Mahoba has an average literacy rate of 74.91%, higher than the state average of 67.68%: male literacy is 82.03%, and female literacy is 66.88% with 12.68% of the population is under 6 years of age.

Schedule Caste (SC) and Schedule Tribe (ST) constitutes 14.93% and 0.42% of the total population in Mahoba. Based on the census 75.21% of the total population are Hindus, 23.64% are Muslims and the rest is occupied by other faiths.

== Government ==
It is a part of the Mahoba Assembly constituency. In 2017 Uttar Pradesh Legislative Assembly election, Rakesh Kumar Goswami was elected from Mahoba constituency, and re-elected in 2022.

== Tourist destinations ==
Tourist destinations in and around Mahoba include:

- Senapati Mahal

== Transportation ==
=== Railways ===
Mahoba Junction railway station is a part of North Central Railway, Prayagraj Division. Many superfast and express trains halt in the station.

== Notable people ==
- Rani Durgavati, a Chandela princess of Mahoba
- Pushpendra Singh Chandel, MP, BJP
- Cecil Pullan, Indian-born English first-class cricketer
- Udal, legendary 12th century general born in Mahoba.
