= Madanpur, Lalitpur, India =

Ancient town

Madanpur is an ancient town on the southern edge of Lalitpur district, Uttar Pradesh, India. The town is known for a large tank built in medieval times and series of ruined temples and inscriptions under the protection of the Archaeological Survey of India. Nine protected monuments appear in the List of Monuments of National Importance in Lalitpur district, India.

== Demographics ==
As of 2011 India census, the location code or village code of Madanpur village is 153608. Madanpur is situated 45 km away from sub-district headquarter Mahroni and 82 km away from district headquarter Lalitpur. As per 2009 stats, Madanpur village is also a gram panchayat. The total geographical area of village is 1411.63 hectares with a population of 1,472 peoples. There are about 277 houses in Madanpur village.

== Monuments ==
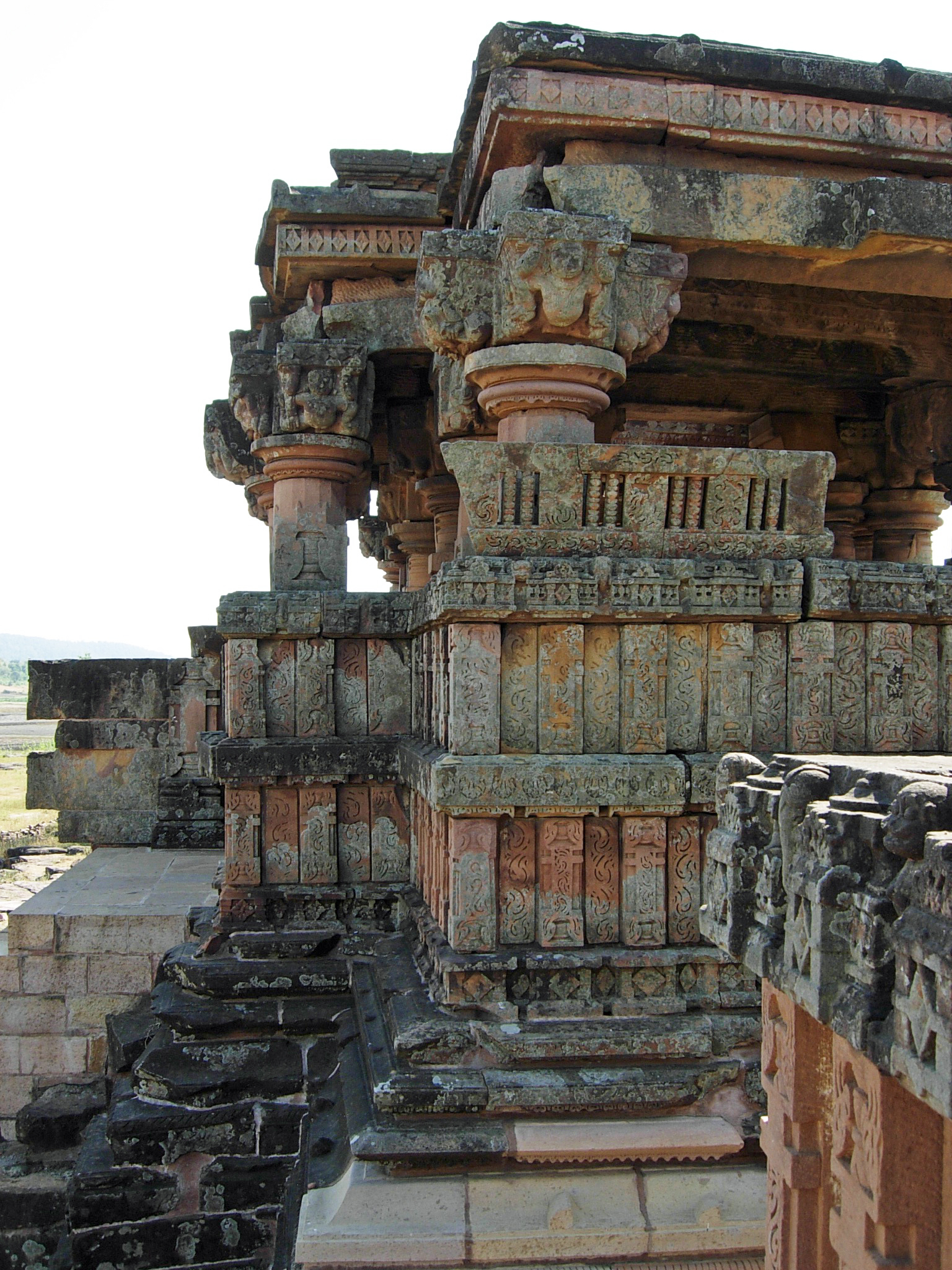
Madanpur (Lalitpur district, UP). Temple exterior from the north.

Choti Kacheri and Badi Kacheri. Two ruined temples stand beside the large medieval tank, Madan Sagar, and are protected monuments dating to the twelfth century. They are locally known as Choti Kachari and Badi Kacheri. One of these structures is notable for a unique painting on the ceiling showing dancing figures and peacocks. The large lotus in the centre of the ceiling is a painted version of the carved lotuses that are found at Khajuraho and other sites. The paintings were first reported in the late nineteenth century by P. C. Mukherji. A series of inscriptions are found inside these buildings. From a historical point of view, the most important records are those mentioning Prithviraj Chauhan (c. 1166–1192).

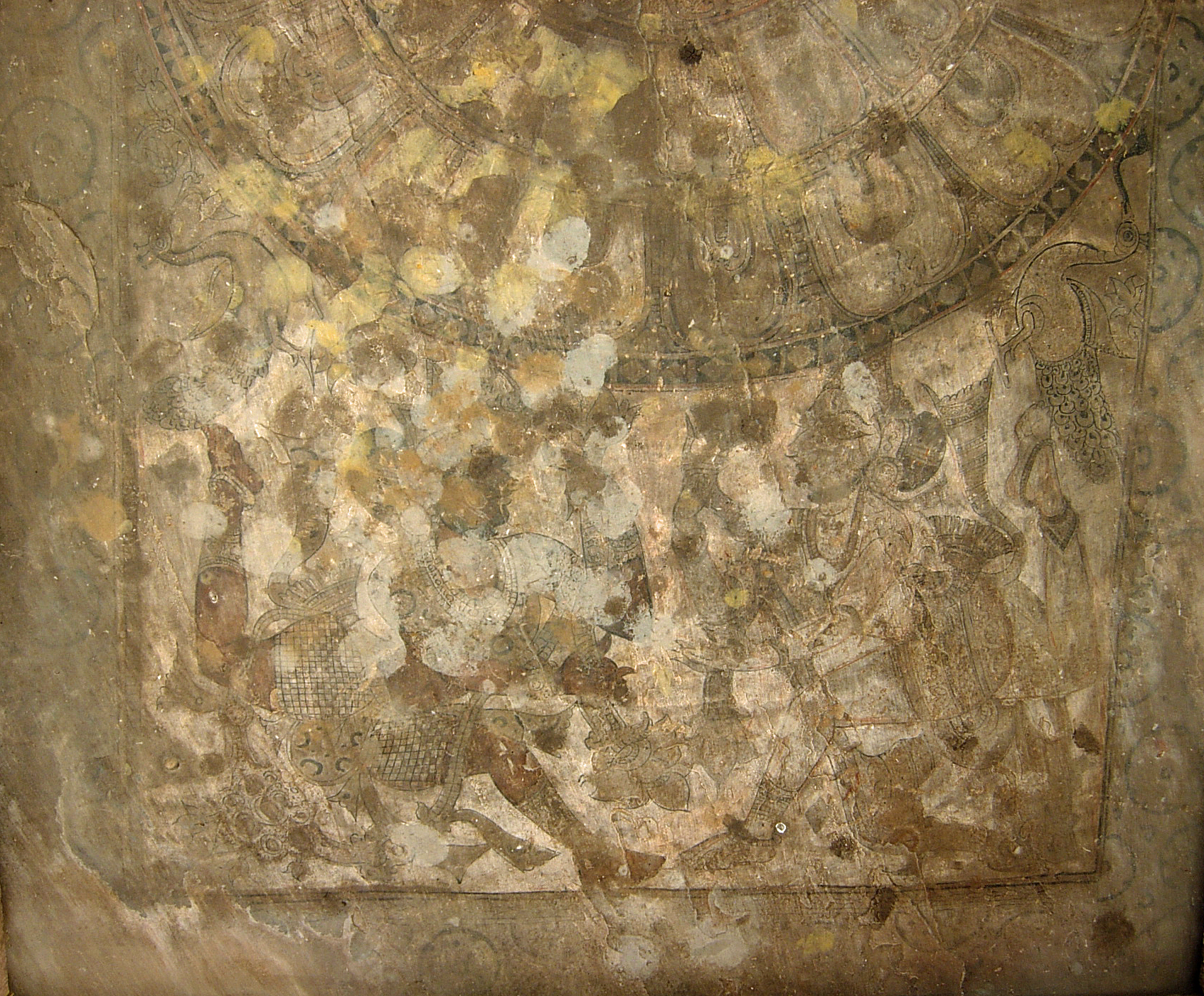
Madanpur (Lalitpur district, UP). Painting on maṇḍapa ceiling dating to the 12th century.

The temples also have a number of pilgrim and donative records.

Panch Marha is a large stone temple in front of five small shrines. A series of Digambara Jain images of about the 11th and 12th centuries stand outside the main temple, some of them inscribed. The place is known amongst the Jains as Shantigiri.

Modi Marha is an old Jain temple of the Digambara located on a ridge to the north of the town.

Champa Marha is a Jain temple complex located above the town on a ridge to the north west.

== See also ==
- History of Madhya Pradesh
