= Alha =

Legendary 12th-century general

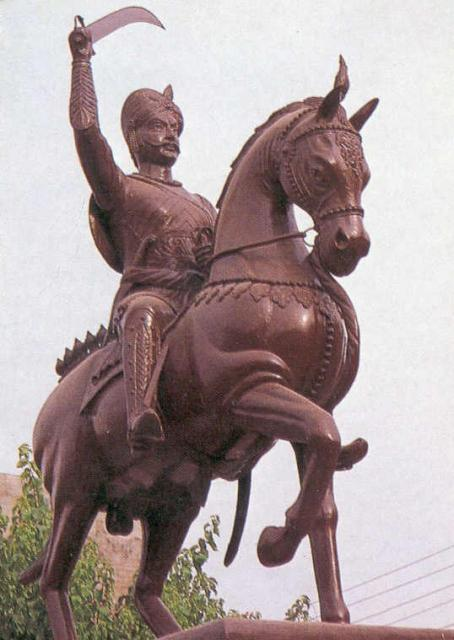
Statue of Alha riding on a horse

Alha (ISO: Ālhā) was a legendary general of the Chandel king Paramardideva (also known as Parmal), who fought Prithviraj Chauhan in 1182 CE. He is one of the main characters of the Alha-Khand ballad.

== Origin ==
According to the legend, Alha and Udal were children of the Dasraj, a successful commander in the army of Chandel king Parmal. They belonged to the Banaphar clan, which are of mixed Ahir and Rajput descent, Purana states that Mahil a Rajput and an enemy of Alha and Udal said that Alha has come to be of a different family (kule htnatvamagatah) because his mother is an Aryan Ahir.

The Bhavishya Purana, a Sanskrit text, states that Alha's mother was called Devaki and was a member of the Ahir caste. The Ahirs are among the "oldest pastoralists" and were rulers of Mahoba.

== Folklore ==
In addition to the Aalha Khand and the Bhavishya Purana, the story of Alha is also found in a number of medieval manuscripts of the Prithviraj Raso. There is also a belief that the story was originally written by Jagnik, bard of Mahoba, but no manuscript has been found.

== See also ==
- Udal of Mahoba
