= Chand Bardai =

Court poet of Prithvi Raj Chauhan

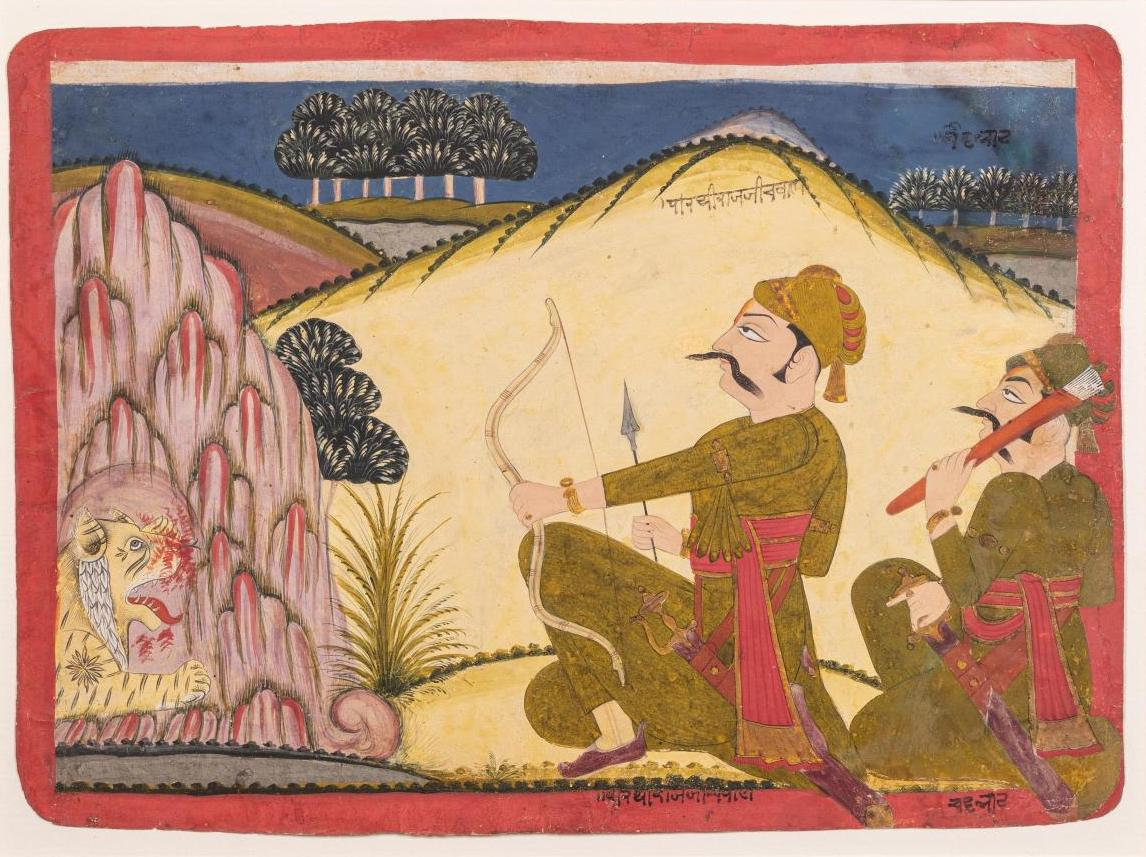
- Painting of Prithviraj Chauhan hunting a tiger, with Chand Bardai beside him, Jodhpur, ca.1830
- Born: 30 September 1149; Lahore
- Died: c. 1200
- Spouse: Kamla, Gauran
Names
- Prithvi Chand

Chand Bardai (died c. 1200) was an Indian poet who composed Prithviraj Raso, an epic poem in Brajbhasa about the life of the Chahamana king Prithviraj Chauhan. The poem presents him as a court poet of Prithviraj. According to it, after Prithviraj was defeated at the Second battle of Tarain and taken to Ghazna by Muhammad of Ghor, Chand Bardai travelled to Ghazna and helped Prithviraj kill Muhammad.

The Prithviraj Raso was embellished with time and quite a few authors added to it. Only parts of the original manuscript are still intact. There are many versions of Raso but scholars agree that the biggest canto is considered the part of original "Prithivraj Raso". In its longest form the poem comprises upwords of 10,000 stanzas.

== Biography ==
Chand Bardai was born in Lahore. Not much is known about his personal life apart from the various details that are entailed in Prithviraj Raso. His work is the earliest surviving text in a Western Hindi lect. He wrote in Dingle, which was an old Rajasthani language.

== See also ==
- Hindi literature
- Prithviraj Chauhan
- Adrishya

== Bibliography ==
- Cynthia Talbot (2015). The Last Hindu Emperor: Prithviraj Cauhan and the Indian Past, 1200–2000. Cambridge University Press. ISBN 9781107118560.
