= Gahadavala dynasty =

Northern Indian dynasty (1072–1237)

- 1072–1237
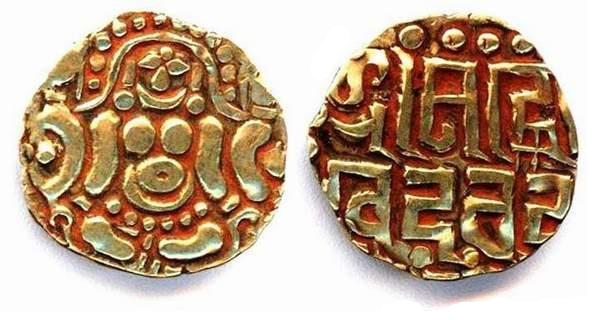
- A Kalachuri-style 'seated goddess' coin of Govindachandra (r. c. 1114–1155 CE). 4 1/2 masha, gold. Obv: Four-armed Lakshmi seated cross-legged on lotus on obverse side holding a lotus in the upper two hands. Rev: Inscription in Nagari script :'Shrimad-Govindachandra'.

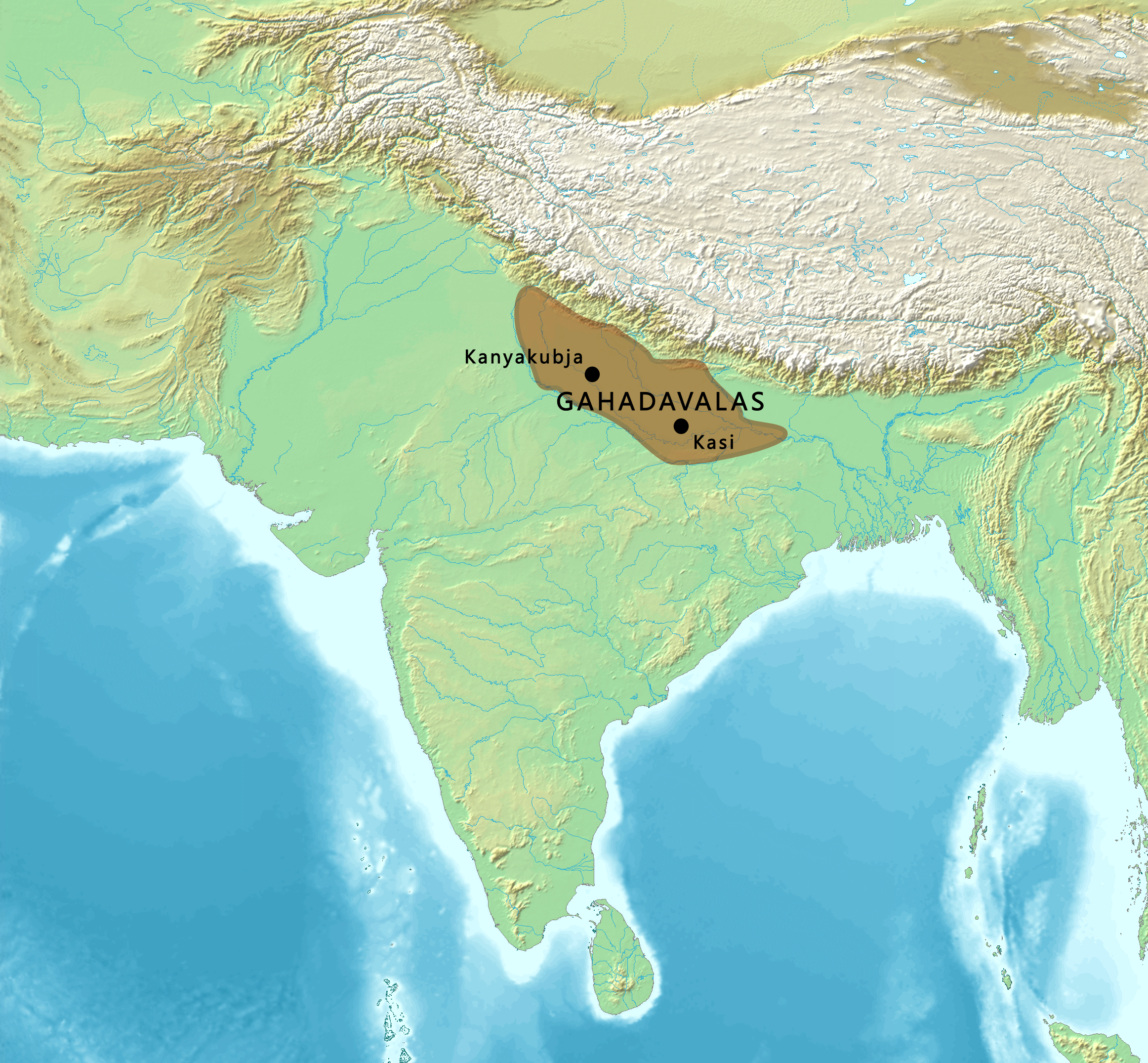
- Approximate territory of the Gahadavalas circa 1150, during the reign of Govindachandra.
- Capital: Varanasi and Kannauj
- Religion: Hinduism; Buddhism; Jainism
- Government: Absolute Monarchy
- History
  - Established: 1072
  - Disestablished: 1237
Preceded by	Succeeded by
Gurjara-Pratihara dynasty; Kalachuris of Tripuri	Ghurid dynasty; Delhi Sultanate
- Today part of: India

Part of a series on the
History of Bihar
Ancient History
Prehistoric and Vedic Era

- Chirand (Neolithic) - Vedic period - Videha - Mithila (ancient) - Anga - Kikata

Urbanisation and Shramana

- Second Urbanisation - Rise of Shramana - Buddhism • Jainism • Ajivika

Gaṇasaṅghas

- Magadha - Vajjika League

  - Nāya
  - Vajji (tribe)
  - Licchavis of Vaishali

- Malla (tribe) - Kashi - Bulis

Imperial Magadha

- Brihadratha dynasty - Haryanka dynasty

  - Bimbisara
  - Ajatashatru

- Shishunaga dynasty - Nanda Empire

  - Mahapadma Nanda

- Maurya Empire

  - Chandragupta Maurya
  - Ashoka
Post-Mauryan and Smriti

- Shunga Empire

  - Pushyamitra Shunga

- Kanva dynasty - Development of Smriti - Brahmanical Revival

The Interregnum

- Kushan Influence - Mitra Dynasty - Resurgence of Licchavis

Classical and medieval
The Classical Age

- Gupta Empire

Early Medieval

- Later Gupta dynasty - Maukharis

Pala Era and Feudatories

- Pala Empire - Khayaravala dynasty - Pithipatis of Magadha

Medieval Mithila

- Karnats of Mithila - Oiniwar dynasty

Islamic Incursions

- Delhi Sultanate

Centers of Learning

- Nalanda - Vikramashila - Odantapuri - Telhara monastery

Early-modern
Afghan and Mughal Rule

- Sur Empire

  - Sher Shah Suri

- Mughal Empire

  - Bihar Subah
Regional Chieftaincies

- Chakwars - Chero dynasty - Gidhaur chieftaincy - Kharagpur Raj - Khokhra chieftaincy

Major Zamindari Estates

- Bettiah Raj - Khandavala dynasty - Dumraon Raj - Hathwa Raj - Jagdishpur estate

Colonial & Independence Era
Colonial Rule (1764–1947)

- Battle of Buxar (1764) - East India Company - Permanent Settlement (1793) - Santhal rebellion - Indian Rebellion of 1857

  - Kunwar Singh

- Bihar famine of 1873–74 - Bihar Province (Est. 1912) - 1934 Nepal–Bihar earthquake

Freedom Struggle

- Champaran Satyagraha (1917) - Salt Satyagraha - Bihar Vidyapeeth - Kisan Sabha

  - Swami Sahajanand Saraswati

- Quit India Movement

  - Azad Dasta
Modern Era (Post-1947)
Congress Era (1947–1967)

- Sri Krishna Sinha - Anugrah Narayan Sinha - Zamindari Abolition

Socialist and JP Era (1967–1989)

- Karpoori Thakur - Bihar Movement (1974) - Jayaprakash Narayan - Bhagalpur riots (1989)

RJD Era (1990–2005)

- Lalu Prasad Yadav - Rabri Devi - Fodder Scam

State Division (2000)

- Bihar Reorganisation Act, 2000 - Creation of Jharkhand

NDA Era (2005–Present)

- Nitish Kumar - Politics of Bihar

Culture, art, and society
Art and architecture

- Mahabodhi Temple - Nalanda - Barabar Caves - Tomb of Sher Shah Suri - Rohtas Fort - Golghar - Mithila Painting - Patna Qalam - Manjusha Art - Didarganj Yakshi

Society and language

- Bihari culture - Mithila • Magadh • Anga - Bihari languages

  - Maithili • Magahi
  - Bhojpuri • Angika
Religion

- Religion in Bihar - Buddhism in Bihar - Jainism in Bihar - Islam in Bihar - Sikhism in Bihar

Portal India Portal Bihar

The Gahadavala dynasty (IAST: Gāhaḍavāla), also known as Gahadavalas of Kannauj, was a Rajput dynasty that ruled parts of the present-day Indian states of Uttar Pradesh and Bihar, during 11th and 12th centuries. Their capital was located at Banaras (now Varanasi) in the Gangetic plains, and for a brief period, they also controlled Kannauj.

Chandradeva, the first monarch of the dynasty, established a sovereign kingdom sometime before 1090, after the decline of the Kalachuri power. The kingdom reached its zenith under his grandson Govindachandra who annexed some of the Kalachuri territories, warded off Ghaznavid raids, and also fought the Palas. In 1194, Govindachandra's grandson Jayachandra was defeated by the Ghurid army under Qutbuddin Aibak, which effectively ended the dynasty's imperial power. The kingdom completely ceased to exist when Jayachandra's successors were defeated by the Delhi Sultanate Mamluk dynasty 's ruler Iltutmish (r. 1211–1236).

== Origin ==
Chandradeva, the first monarch of the dynasty, was a son of Mahichandra and a grandson of Yashovigraha. The Gahadavala inscriptions state that Yashovigraha "seized the earth and made her fond of the king's sceptre (or justice)". He did not bear any royal titles, so it appears that he was a petty chief with some military victories to his credit. He probably served a prominent king, possibly the 11th century Kalachuri king Karna. His son Mahichandra (alias Mahitala or Mahiyala) bore the feudatory title nṛpa, and is said to have defeated several enemies. He may have been a Kalachuri vassal.

According to Chandrawati inscriptions from 1093 CE and 1100 CE, the Gahadavalas occupied Kanyakubja after the descendants of Devapala had been destroyed. This Devapala can be identified as the mid-10th century Gurjara-Pratihara king of Kanyakubja. Chandradeva probably started his career as a feudatory, but declared independence sometime before 1089 CE.

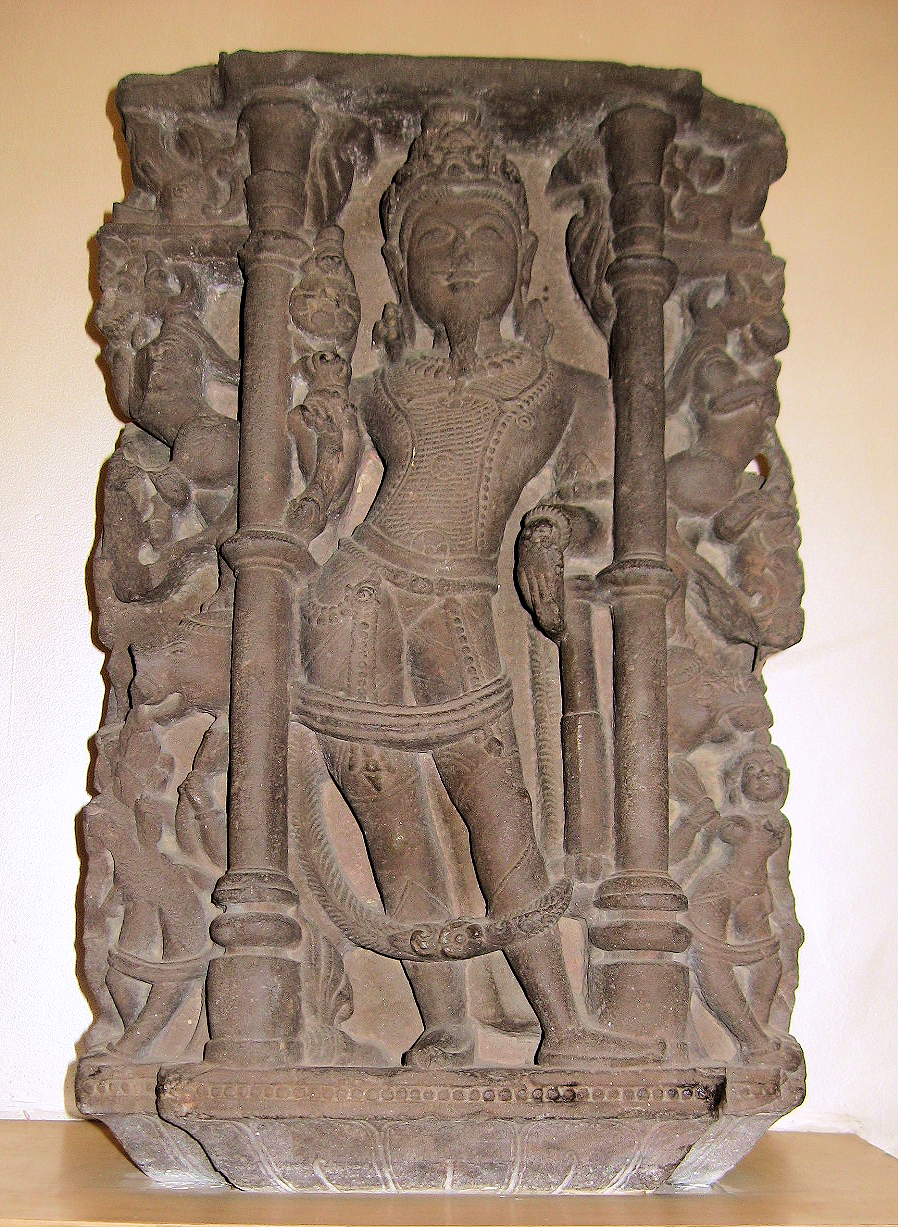
Martanda (an aspect of the Sun-God or Surya), Gahadavala dynasty, Rajasthan, 12th century CE

The sudden rise of the Gahadavalas has led to speculation that they descended from an earlier royal house. Rudolf Hoernlé once proposed that the Gahadavalas were an offshoot of the Pala dynasty of Gauda, but this theory has been totally rejected now. Another theory identifies the dynasty's founder Chandradeva as the Kannauj Rashtrakuta scion Chandra, but this theory is contradicted by historical evidence. For example, the Rashtrakutas of Kannauj claimed origin from the legendary solar dynasty. On the other hand, the Gahadavala inscriptions state they gained power after the destruction of the solar and the lunar dynasties. Moreover, Kumaradevi, the queen of the Gahadavala ruler Govindachandra came from a Rashtrakuta branch that ruled in Bodh Gaya. Her Sarnath inscription mentions the Gahadavalas and the Rashtrakutas as two distinct families and does not indicate that one was a branch of the other.

Yet another theory identifies Chandradeva as Chand Rai, a "keeper of elephants" according to the medieval Muslim historian Salman. The Diwan-i-Salman states that a Ghaznavid army led by Mahmud (c. 971-1030) invaded India and defeated one Jaipal. As a result of this victory, the feudatory chiefs from all over the country lined up to offer allegiance to Mahmud. Mahmud received so many elephants as gifts from these chiefs, that an elephant stable was set up in Kannauj, with Chand Rai as its manager. According to the theory, Chand Rai acquired the rulership of Kannauj by promising to pay a tribute to the Ghaznavids. The Ghaznavid raids of the Gahadavala kingdom resulted from the non-payment of this tribute. The Gahadavalas inscriptions mention a Turushka-danda ("Turkic punishment") tax, which according to the proponents of this theory, was collected to pay a tribute to the Ghaznavid (Turkic) overlord. This theory can be criticized on several grounds. First, no Muslim chronicles mention imposition of any tribute on Chand Rai. Secondly, the meaning of Turushka-danda is not certain. Lastly, neither Hindu nor Muslim sources indicate that the Ghaznavid invasions were as a result of non-payment of tribute.

=== Etymology ===
The etymology of the term "Gahadavala" is uncertain. This dynastic name appears only in four inscriptions of the Gahadavalas: three inscriptions issued by Chandradeva's grandson Govindachandra (as a prince), and the Sarnath inscription issued by his wife Kumaradevi who belonged to the Pithipati dynasty of Bodh Gaya. No contemporary inscriptions of the neighbouring dynasties use the term "Gahadavala" to describe the rulers of Kanyakubja or Varanasi. The dynastic name does not appear in contemporary literature, including in the works authored by the Gahadavala courtiers Shriharsha and Lakshmidhara (author of Kṛtya-Kalpataru).

C. V. Vaidya and R. C. Majumdar, who connected the Gahadavalas to the Rashtrakutas, speculated that the dynastic name might have derived from "Gawarmad", a place-name mentioned in a 1076 CE Kannada language inscription. However, the term is not mentioned in the early Gahadavala inscriptions. Therefore, if the dynasty's name has any geographical significance, it points to the newly acquired territories in northern India.

According to the rulers of the Kantit feudal estate, who claimed descent from the Gahadavalas, the term "Gahadavala" derives from the Sanskrit word grahavāra ("overcomer of the evil planet"). Their fanciful legend claims that Yayati's son acquired the title grahavāra after defeating the evil planet (graha) Saturn.

== Territory ==
Find spots of the inscriptions from the Gahadavala reign

The Gahadavala power was concentrated in what is now eastern Uttar Pradesh. At times, their rule extended to the western parts of Bihar. The 1090 CE Chandrawati inscription of Chandradeva states that he protected the sacred places of Kashi (Varanasi), Kushika (Kannauj), Uttara Koshala (the area around Ayodhya), and Indrasthaniyaka..

The identity of an area called Indrasthaniyaka is unknown, but because of its similarity to the word "Indraprastha", some scholars have identified it as modern Delhi. Based on this, historians such as Roma Niyogi have proposed that the Tomara rulers of Delhi might have been Gahadavala feudatories. If this assumption is true, then the Gahadavala kingdom extended up to Delhi in the north-west. However, historical evidence suggests that Delhi was under the control of the Chahamanas since Vigraharaja IV (r. c. 1150-1164 CE), and before that under the Tomara sovereigns. No historical records indicate that the Gahadavalas ever ruled Delhi. Rahin (or Rahan) village in Etawah district is the furthest point in the north-west where the Gahadavala inscriptions have been discovered. Some coins attributed to Madanapala are associated with Delhi, but according to numismatist P. C. Roy these coins were actually issued by a Tomara king of same name. According to Roy, Indrasthaniyaka should be identified with a place other than Delhi.

=== Capital ===
The Gahadavalas are associated with two ancient cities: Kanyakubja and Varanasi. According to the medieval legends, Kanyakubja (Kannauj) was their capital. However, according to Al-Biruni, most of the Kanyakubja city was in ruins by 1030 CE, nearly half a century before the dynasty's founder Chandradeva ascended the throne.

The vast majority of the Gahadavala inscriptions have been discovered in and around Varanasi; only one has been found in the Kanyakubja area. The majority of these inscriptions state that the king made a grant after bathing in the Ganga river at Varanasi. This suggests that the Gahadavala kings mainly lived in and around Varanasi, which was their favoured capital. They probably considered Kanyakubja as a 'capital of honour', since it had been a seat of reputed kingdoms since the Maukhari period.

A verse in the 1104 CE Basahi inscription of Madanapala states that his father Chandradeva had made Kanyakubja his capital. However, Madanapala's 1105 CE Kamauli grant omits this verse, although it repeats all the other introductory verses from the Basahi grant. Other than the 1104 CE Basahi inscription, no other inscription describes Kanyakubja as the Gahadavala capital.

Historian Roma Niyogi theorized that Chandradeva temporarily moved his seat from Varanasi to Kanyakubja, because Kanyakubja was reputed as the capital of the earlier imperial powers. However, the Gahadavalas lost Kanyakubja to Ghaznavids somewhere between 1104 CE and 1105 CE, and Madanapala's son Govindachandra had to wage a war to recover it. As a result, the Gahadavalas probably moved their capital back to Varanasi soon after Chandradeva's reign. The writings of the Muslim chroniclers such as Ali ibn al-Athir, Minhaj-i-Siraj, and Hasan Nizami consistently describe Jayachandra as the "Rai of Banaras" (ruler of Varanasi), and make no reference to Kannauj (Kanyakubja) in their description of the Gahadavalas. This further suggests that the Gahadavalas no longer controlled Kanyakaubja by Jayachandra's time.

== History ==
=== Rise to power ===
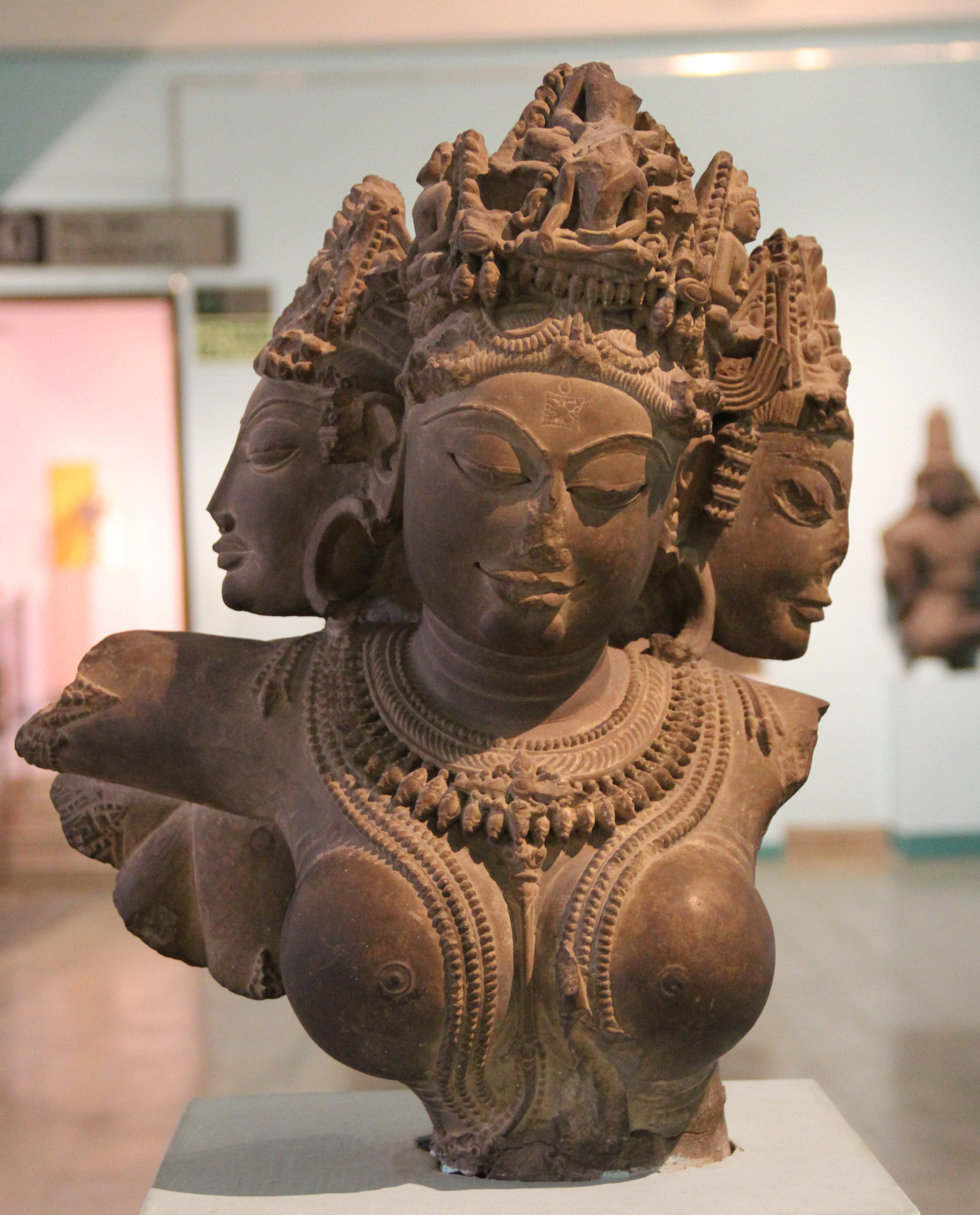
Vajra Tara, Sarnath, 11th century, Gahadavala Dynasty.

By the last quarter of the 11th century, the north-central India was a troubled territory as a result of Ghaznavid raids and the lack of a strong imperial power. The Gurjara-Pratihara empire had ceased to exist. Their successors, such as the Paramaras and the Kalachuris, had declined in power. In these times of chaos, the first Gahadavala king Chandradeva brought stability to the region by establishing a strong government. The 1104 CE Bashai (or Basahi) inscription of his son Madanapala declares that he saved the distressed earth after the deaths of the Paramara Bhoja and the Kalachuri Karna.

Since the Kalachuris controlled the area around Varanasi before the Gahadavalas, it appears that Chandradeva captured this territory from them. The Kalachuri king defeated by him was probably Karna's successor Yashah-Karna. Chandradeva's inscriptions indicate that he also tried to expand his kingdom in the east, but the Pala chronicle Ramacharitam suggests that his plan was foiled by Ramapala's feudatory Bhimayashas.

=== Consolidation ===
Chandradeva was succeeded by Madanapala, who faced invasions from the Muslim Ghaznavid dynasty. He is identified with "Malhi", who was the king of Kannauj (Kanyakubja) according to the medieval Muslim chronicles. Diwan-i-Salman by the contemporary Muslim historian Salman states that Malhi was imprisoned by the Ghaznavids, and released only after the payment of a ransom. The Gahadavala inscriptions indicate that Madanapala's son Govindachandra led the military expeditions during his reign. As a result of these expeditions, the Ghaznavids were forced to conclude a peace treaty with the Gahadavalas. The Kṛtya-Kalpataru, written by his courtier Lakashidhara, suggests that he also killed a Ghaznavid general.

Govindachandra succeeded his father as the Gahadavala king sometime during 1109-1114 CE. The Gahadavalas became the most prominent power of northern India as a result of his military conquests and diplomatic relations. His adoption of the Kalachuri titles and coinage indicate that he defeated a Kalachuri king, probably Yashah-Karna or his successor Gaya-Karna.

As a prince, Govindachandra appears to have repulsed a Pala invasion, sometime before 1109 CE. The Pala-Gahadavala conflict halted for a few decades as a result of his marriage with Kumaradevi, a relative of the Pala monarch Ramapala. Epigraphic evidence suggests that there was a revival of the Pala-Gahadavala rivalry in the 1140s CE, during the reign of Govindachandra and the Pala monarch Madanapala (not to be confused with Govindachandra's father). Although the identity of the aggressor is not certain, the conflict seems to have happened over control of present-day western Bihar. Both Pala and Gahadavala inscriptions were issued in this area during this period.

=== Decline ===
The Gahadavalas and main South Asian polities in 1175, on the eve of the Ghurid Empire invasion of the subcontinent.

The last extant inscription of Govindachandra is dated 1154 CE, and the earliest available inscription of his successor Vijayachandra is dated 1168 CE. Such a long gap is unusual for the dynasty, and may indicate troubled times arising out of an external invasion or a war of succession after Govindachandra's death. Vijayachandra faced a Ghaznavid invasion, which he seems to have repulsed sometime before 1164 CE. His focus on guarding the western frontiers against the Ghaznavids may have led to the neglect of the kingdom's eastern border, which later resulted in a Sena invasion.

Jayachandra, the last powerful king of the dynasty, faced a Ghurid invasion under Muhammad of Ghor and his slave commander Qutbuddin Aibak. He was defeated and killed at the Battle of Chandawar in 1194. According to the contemporary Muslim historian Hasan Nizami, the Ghurids then sacked Varanasi, where they destroyed a large number of temples. After Jayachandra's death, several local feudatory chiefs offered their allegiance to the Ghurids. A legendary account in Prithviraj Raso states that Jayachandra allied with the Ghurids against Prithviraj Chauhan, who had eloped with his daughter Samyukta. However, such legends are not supported by historical evidence.

Jayachandra's son Harishchandra succeeded him on the Gahadavala throne. According to one theory, he was a Ghurid vassal. However, in an 1197 CE Kotwa inscription, he assumes the titles of a sovereign. According to historian Roma Niyogi, it is possible that he controlled Kanyakubja, as no contemporary Muslim historians mention that the Ghurids captured the city at that time. Firishta (16th century) was the earliest writer to claim that the Muslims captured Kannauj in the 1190s, but his account can be ignored as inaccurate because he flourished around four centuries later, in the 16th century. Harishchandra may have also retained Varanasi.

Meanwhile, the control of the region around Etawah appears to have been usurped by Jayachandra's nephew Ajayasimha. The 13th century chronicler Minhaj al-Siraj Juzjani refers to a victory achieved by the Delhi Sultanate ruler Iltutmish (r. 1211-1236) at Chandawar; Ajayasimha was probably Iltutmish's enemy in this battle.

The ultimate fate of Harishchandra is not known, but he was probably defeated by the Delhi Sultanate under Iltutmish. A 1237 inscription issued during the reign of one Adakkamalla of Gahadavala family was found in Nagod State (present-day Satna district of Madhya Pradesh). Adakkamalla may have been the successor of Harishchandra. Another possibility is that Adakkamalla was from a different branch of the family that ruled a small fief. Nothing is known about Adakkamalla's successors.

=== Claimed descendants ===
The bardic chronicles of Rajputana claim that the Rathore rulers of Jodhpur State descended from the family of the Gahadavala ruler Jayachandra. For example, according to Prithviraj Raso, Rathore was an epithet of Jayachandra (Jaichand). The rulers of the Manda feudal estate, who described themselves as Rathore, traced their ancestry to Jayachandra's alleged brother Manikyachandra (Manik Chand). These claims are of later origin, and their historical veracity is doubtful. The rulers of Bijaipur-Kantit feudal estate near Mirzapur also described themselves as Gahrwars, and claimed descent from the Gahadavalas.

The records of the Bundela rulers of the Orchha State trace their ancestry to the solar dynasty through Hemkaran alias Pancham Singh, a Gahadavala (Gaharwar) chief of Varanasi. Henry Miers Elliot, based on the testimony of a "Mohammedan historian", believed that the Bundelas of Orchha descended from a Gahadavala ("Gaharwar Rajput") and his Khangar concubine.

== Administration ==
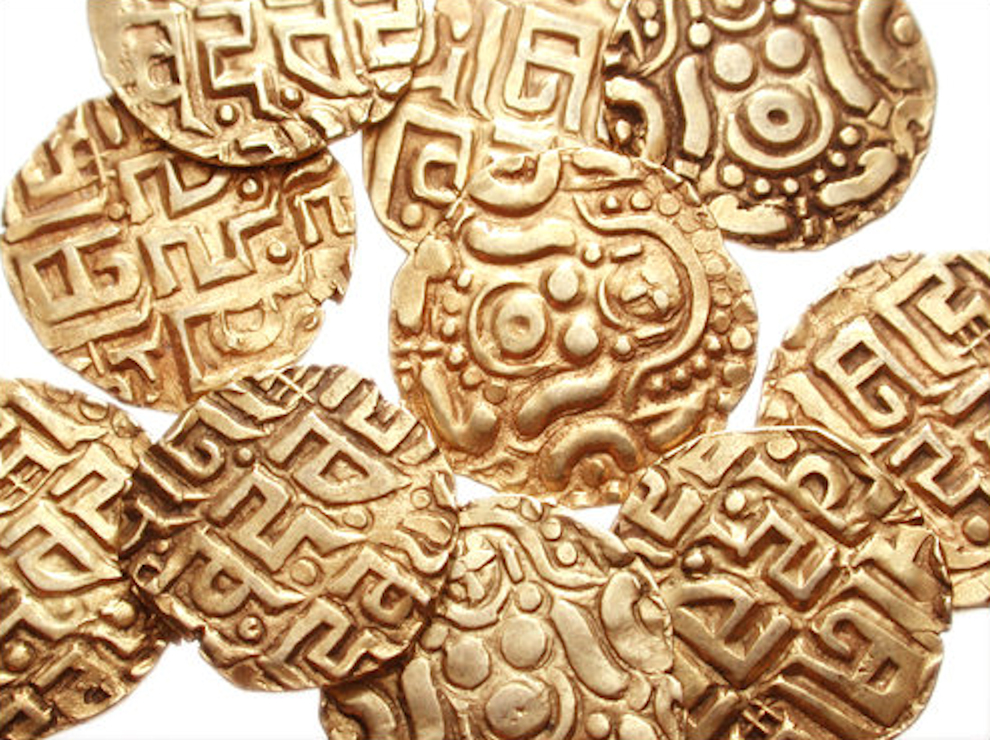
Coinage of the Gahadavalas of Kanauj. Govindachandra and later. Circa 1114-1154 CE

The Gahadavalas controlled their territory through semi-independent feudatory chiefs, whose various titles included Rāṇaka, Mahānāyaka, Mahārāja and Rāja.

The king's officials were known as amātyas. Their duties are described in Lakshmidhara's Kṛtya-Kalpataru. The most important court positions included:

- mantrin (minister)
- purohita (royal priest)
- pratīhāra (chamberlain or palace mayor)
- senapati (commander-in-chief)
- bhāṇḍāgārika (treasurer or chief revenue-collector)
- akṣapatalika (accountant general)
- bhiṣak (chief physician)
- naimittika (astrologer)
- antaḥpurika (incharge of queens' quarters)
- dūta (envoy or political agent).

The yuvaraja (heir apparent) and other princes announced grants in their own name, while the grants made by the queens were announced by the king.

The territory directly ruled by the Gahadavala monarch was sub-divided into several administrative divisions:

- viṣaya: provinces
- pathaka: sub-provinces
- pattalā: group of villages
- grāma: villages
- pāṭaka: outlying hamlets associated with some villages

== Cultural activities ==
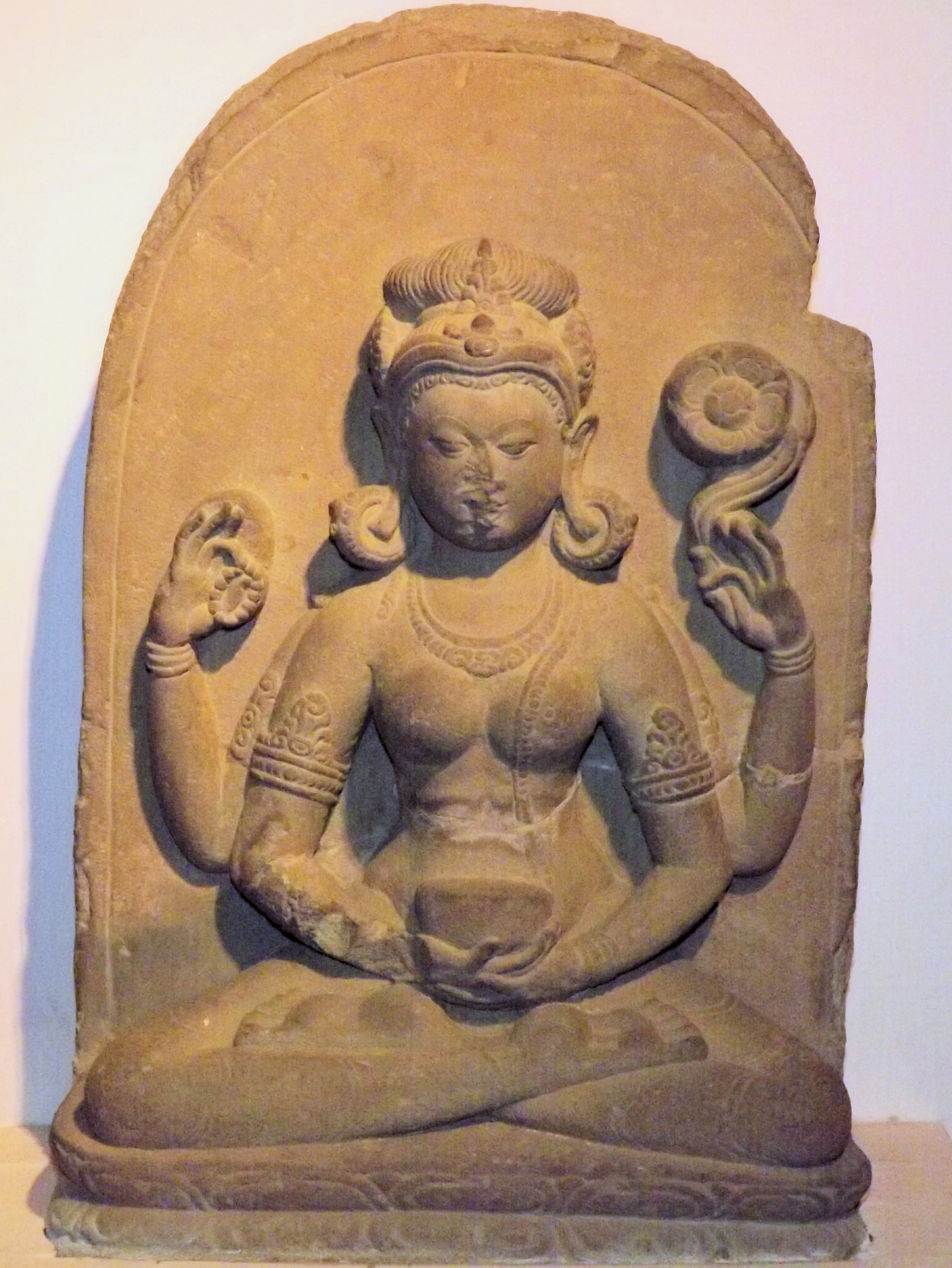
Chunda, Sarnath, 11th century CE, Gahadavala dynasty

According to the Gahadavala inscriptions, Govindachandra appreciated and patronized different branches of learning (as indicated by his title Vividha-vidya-vichara-vachaspati). His courtier Lakshmidhara composed Kṛtya-Kalpataru at the king's request.

Vijayachandra also patronized scholars and poets including Shriharsha, whose works include Naishadha Charita and the now-lost Shri-Vijaya-Prashasti. Jayachandra's court poet Bhatta Kedar wrote a eulogy titled Jaichand Prakash (c. 1168) on his life, but the work is now lost. Another lost eulogy on his life is the poet Madhukar's Jaya-Mayank-Jasha-Chandrika (c. 1183).

The Gahadavala dynasty played a significant role in the development and popularisation of Chhath Puja in the region, promoting the worship of the Sun and contributing to the festival's establishment as an important cultural and religious tradition.

== Religion ==
The Gahadavala kings worshipped Vishnu. For example, according to the 1167 CE Kamauli inscription, Jayachandra was initiated as a worshipper of Krishna (an incarnation of Vishnu) as a prince. The kings also offered homage to other Hindu gods, including Shiva and Surya. The Gahadvala inscriptions describe the kings as Parama-Maheshvara ("devotees of Shiva").

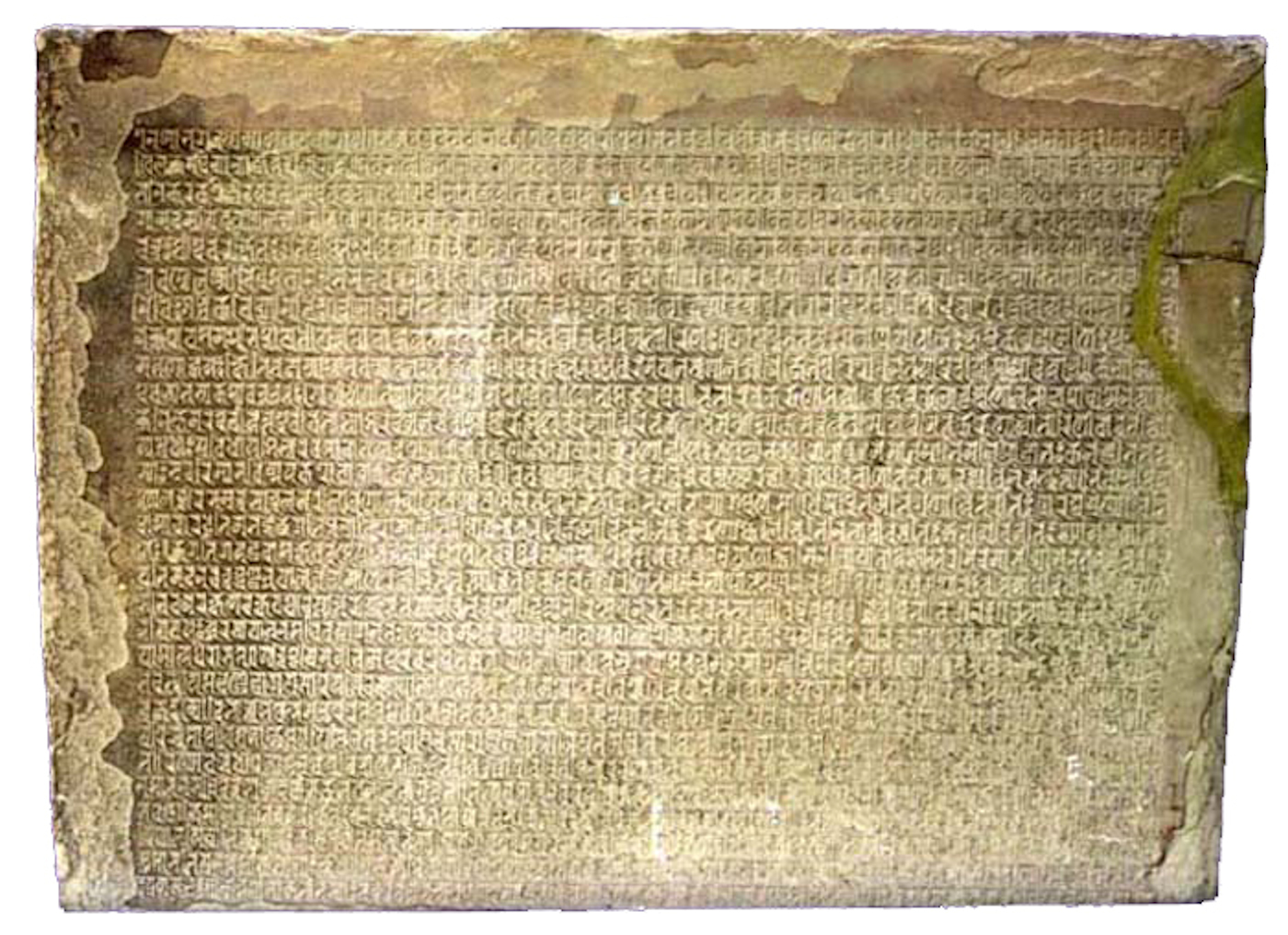
Inscription of Kumaradevi, the Queen of Gahadawala king Govindachandra who belonged to the Pithipatis of Bodh Gaya, which refers the construction of Dharmachakra-Jina-Vihara at Sarnath, and the invasions of the "wicked" Turushkas. 12th century CE.

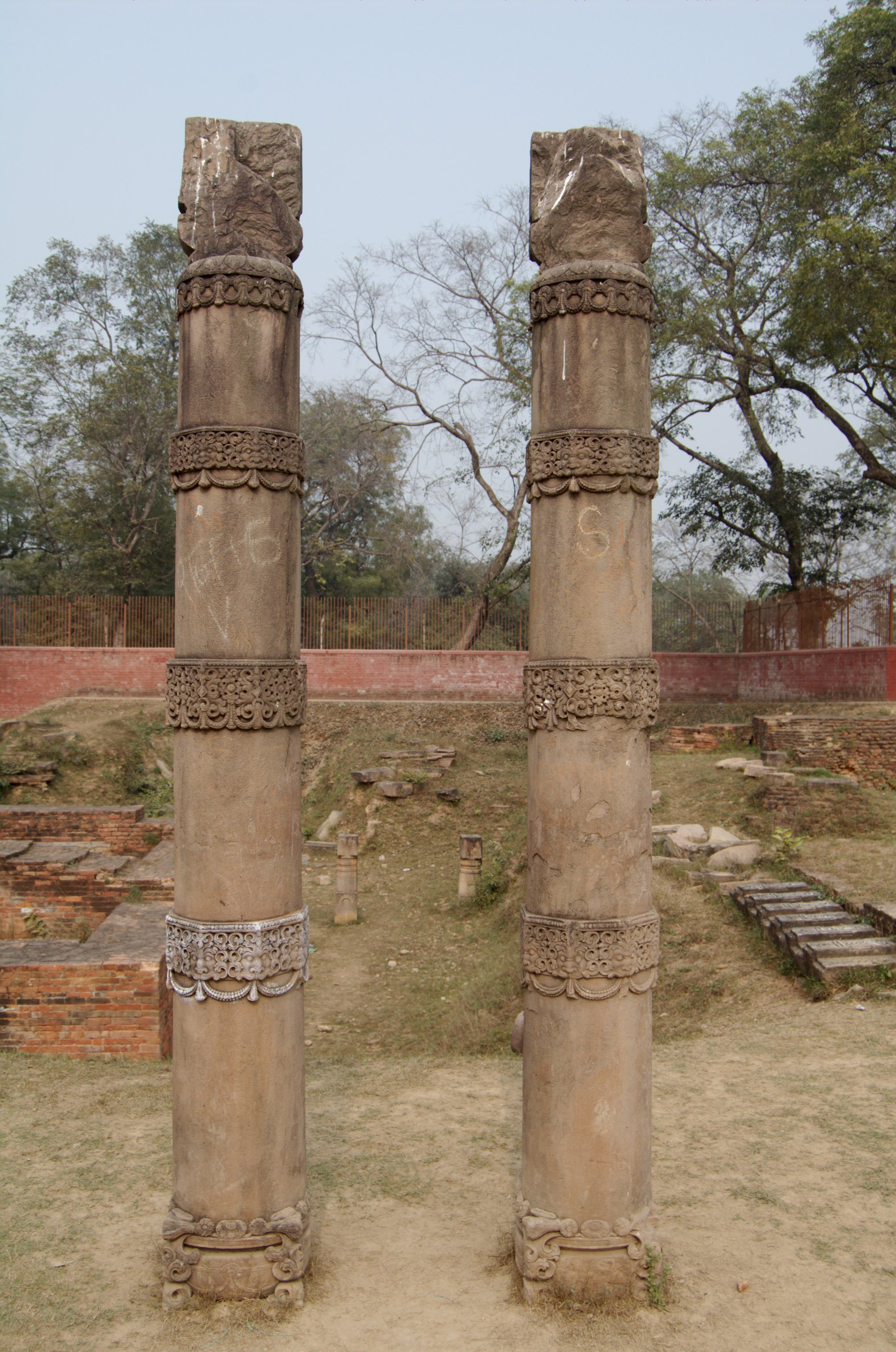
Remains of decorated pillars in the Dharmachakra-Jina-Vihara established by Queen Kumaradevi.

The Gahadavalas were also tolerant towards Buddhism. Two of Govindachandra's queens — Kumaradevi and Vasantadevi — were Buddhists. An inscription discovered at Bodh Gaya suggests that Jayachandra also showed interest in Buddhism. This inscription begins with an invocation to Gautam Buddha, the Bodhisattavas, and one Shrimitra (Śrimītra). Shrimitra is named as a perceptor (diksha-guru) of Kashisha Jayachchandra, identified with the king Jayachandra. The inscription records the construction of a guha (cave monastery) at Jayapura. Archaeologist Federica Barba theorizes that the Gahadavalas built large Hindu temples in traditional Buddhist cities such as Sarnath, and converted Buddhist shrines into Brahmanical ones.

The Gahadavala inscriptions mention a tax called Turushka-danda ("Turkic punishment"). Scholars interpret it as a contribution towards a tribute to be paid to the Turushkas (Ghaznavids), or a tax towards potential war expenses involving Turushka enemies. Some scholars, such as Sten Konow, had theorized this to be a tax imposed on Turushkas (Muslim Turkic people), implying that the Gahadavalas persecuted Muslim subjects — this has fallen out of favor with modern scholars.

== List of rulers ==
- Chandradeva (c. 1089-1103 CE)
- Madanapala (c. 1104-1113 CE)
- Govindachandra (c. 1114-1155 CE)
- Vijayachandra (c. 1155-1169 CE), alias Vijayapala or Malladeva
- Jayachandra (c. 1170-1194 CE), called Jaichand in vernacular legends
- Harishchandra (c. 1194-1197 CE)

Adakkamalla, attested by a 1237 CE inscription, may have been the successor of Harishchandra. But this cannot be said with certainty.

== Family tree ==
Gahadavala dynasty

Chandradeva^{(1)} r. 1089-1103
Madanapala^{(2)} r. 1103-1113
Govindachandra^{(3)} r. 1113-1155
Vijayachandra^{(4)} r. 1155-1169
Jayachandra^{(5)} r. 1169-1194
Harishchandra^{(6)} r. 1194-1197

== See also ==
- History of Varanasi
- Sena–Gahadavala conflicts
