= Sena–Gahadavala Conflicts =

12th-century conflicts in India

Sena - Gahadavala Conflicts
Date	12th century
Location	Kashi, Allahabad, Gaya
Result	Sena victory
Territorial changes	Senas capture Kashi, Gaya and other eastern possessions from the Gahadavala dynasty

Belligerents
Sena dynasty	Gahadavala dynasty

Commanders and leaders
Lakshmana Sena	Vijayachandra; Jayachandra

The Sena-Gahadavala Conflicts were a series of frequent expeditions of the Sena dynasty into the dominions of the Gahadavala dynasty, after the death of the Gahadavala emperor Govindachandra.

== Sena Expeditions on Gahadavala Dominions ==
=== Lakshmana Sena's Early Campaigns ===
The Madhainagar inscription of Lakshmana states that as a prince he captured Gauda and then he defeated the king of Kashi, this suggests that he gained success during two occasions, one being as a prince, while another after his coronation.

=== Sena Invasion of Magadha ===
The Gahadavala power in Magadha was a threat to the Senas, earlier Vallalasena's campaigns into magadha didn't carry much success but it was a short lived success which probably gave the Gahadavala power to annihilate the Pala power in Magadha. The struggle for power of Magadh which began during the reign of Vallalasena was continued by his successors, there's Lakshmana Sena managed to drive the Ghadavalas from Magadh and would later raid the heart dominions of the Ghadavalas.

=== Sena invasion of Gaya ===
The King of Kashi, which is mentioned in the records of Lakshmana Sena, which clearly mentions the Gahadavala king and by putting a defeat upon the emperor he ousted the Gahadavala king from Magadha.The evidences of the Sena Conquest of Gaya comes from the two records of Ashokachalla found in Gaya. Although the correct interpretation of the dates is open to dispute but there is a general consensus of opinion that the expression used in these two records undoubtedly proves that Gaya was included within the dominions of Lakshmana Sena . Another notable mention is that the laudatory verse of Umapatidhara, referred to above, includes Magadha among the conquests of his hero, none can be more the more plausible hero than Lakshmana Sena here .The conquest of the Gaya region, if not the whole of Magadha, was evidently only the first stage in the successful campaign of Lakshmana Sena against Jayachandra. According to the interpretation of Asokachalla's records suggested later, the Gaya district remained in possession of Lakshmana Sena till it was it was captured by the Ghurids.

=== Lakshmana Sena's Expedition of 1157-1158 ===
Lakshmana Sena shortly after his coronation led an expedition to the Gahadavala dominions, the temporary success of the Senas can be justified by the death of Govindachandra and the Ghurid invasions upon the Gahadavalas.

=== Sena Raids on Benares and Allahabad ===
The planting of the pillars of victory in Benares and Allahabad, referred to in the records of Lakshmanasena's sons, represents the succeeding stages in the same campaign, which led him into the far Gahadavala dominions.His advance up to Benares and Allahabad was probably more likely of a raid than a conquest. Which might have resulted in weakening of the Gahadavala power, and keeping him busy at a time when he required peace and his full strength to join the confederacy against the Ghurids.

== Aftermath ==
Despite Lakshmana Sena's temporary success, Senas did not attempt for annexations of the dominions of the Ghadavalas however the Gahadavala kingdom suffered enormous setbacks and possibly their capital was occupied by the Sena forces.
