= Percival Chater Manuk =

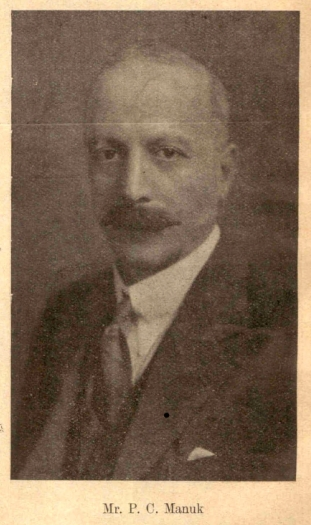

Percival Chater Manuk (22 July 1873 – 6 August 1946) was an Indian judge and collector of art. He was posted in Patna as a high court judge and collected a large number of art objects and was among the first to write about the "Patna School of Painting". His collections are now deposited in museums in England, including the British Museum, the Fitzwilliam and the Victoria and Albert Museum.

== Life and work ==
Percival Paul Astwachatoon Manuk was born in Calcutta, of Armenian heritage. A grand uncle of his was Sir Catchick Paul Chater. He studied law in England and returned to India where he became a bar-at-law, barrister and later judge (1918-19) at the Patna High Court. While in Patna he collected art objects extensively and interacted with the artist Ishwari Prasad. He had a home in Bankipore which became a museum that was open to the public. He was married to Nellie and the birth of a son Geoffrey Chater (b. 5 January 1894) is on record. The Patna Museum was started with patronage from Edward Gait and Manuk who was then a bar-at-law. William George Archer visited Manuk in the 1940s and became aware of the Company School of Art from Manuk. In 1943 he wrote about the Patna School of Art. He may have been among the first to use the term. Mildred Archer dedicated a book on Patna Painting to "P. C. Manuk and Miss Coles". He later lived in Dehra Dun and left India around 1945 although his probate notes his address as Bankipore, Patna. In his will he left a part of his collections to Miss Gertrude Coles. It is suggested that his wife had mental health issues and Coles had been involved in her care. The Will states that he left some material for Coles "in consideration of her retaining for my exclusive use at all times a suite of rooms in her London house" and "as the condition of my wife's mental health precluded me from leaving her any portion of personal property or effects, I have already long ago made an absolute gift to the late Gertrude Mary Coles of the whole of my collection of objects d'art." He also mentioned several other beneficiaries who were involved in his care including Gerald Austin Bernhard, Sailendra Nath Datta, Gregory Charles Samuel Manuk, Herbert Clifford Coles, and Philip Godfrey Swaab. A part of the collection was sold in 1948-49 for £5,326.

Among the collections bequeathed by Manuk and Coles is a series of forty erotic Indian miniatures which document Moghul rulers and their intimate relationships with Rajputs. It is thought to be inspired by the Kamasutra and shows male lovers associated with Mughals and Rajputs all depicted nude and the nastal‘iq Persian writing for each begins with "The Private Pleasure of" and indicates the names of the people involved. It has been considered as an important document of the socio-political relationships between Mughals and Rajputs in the late 17th century.
