= Shriharsha =

12th century Indian philosopher poet

Shri-harsha (IAST: Śrīharṣa) was a 12th century CE Indian philosopher and poet. Śrīharṣa works discuss various themes in Indian Philosophy, such as pramana. He has been often interpreted as promoting Advaita Vedānta in his Sweets of Refutation (Khaṇḍanakhaṇḍanakhādya), however, this interpretation remains controversial among modern scholars. Śrīharṣa's thought was influential for both Nyāya-Vaiśeṣika thinkers and also for the Advaita Vedānta tradition.

== Life ==
Śrīharṣa was born to a Kanyakubja Brahmin Śrīhira and Mamalladevī. His father, Śrīhira, was a poet in the court of the Gahadavala king Vijayachandra. His father was also a guide of common people towards god with vedas, Bhagavad Gita's thoughts etc. His father asked Harsha at the time of his death to study well and become a pandit. He told him to use his shiksha (education) towards making life of common people divinity oriented and better. Also, he told Śrīharṣa to take thoughts of Bhagavad Gita to every one.

Śrīharṣa had a classic Indian education at a gurukula, studying and living under guru's guidance. He mastered all scriptures and all schools of thoughts prevailing at that time. He famously wrote the Sweets of Refutation (Khaṇḍanakhaṇḍanakhādya), which critiques the epistemology of the Nyaya school and the rational inquiry in general.

Śrīharṣa spent his later life in ascetic serenity on the banks of River Ganga. He composed several works. These include Naiṣadhacarita, Khaṇḍanakhaṇḍakhādya, Vijayaprasasti, Chindaprasasti, Gaudorvisakulaprasasti, Sahasankacarita, Arnavavarnana and Amarakhandana.

== Philosophy ==
Śrīharṣa's most well known philosophical text is the r ("Sugar-candy Pieces of Refutations" or just Sweets of Refutation).

Śrīharṣa thinks that any philosophical argument or view is subject to refutation-arguments (khaṇḍana-yukti) and thus all philosophical arguments are defeasible and are not sufficient evidence to believe in any philosophical view.

The work focuses on skeptical critiques of rational philosophical proofs, especially the epistemological system of the Nyāya-Vaiśeṣika philosophical school. His main critique is the inadequacy of the Nyaya definitions of the six philosophical categories they defend: substance (dravya), quality (guṇa), action (karma), universal (sāmānya), ultimate differentiator (viśeṣa), and the relation of inherence (samavāya). Śrīharṣa also critiques the Nyaya definition of knowledge, and argues that there may no single satisfactory definition.

Śrīharṣa thinks that his critiques also provide evidence for the non-duality of consciousness, the view that only consciousness truly exists. Indeed, while Śrīharṣa critiques almost all philosophical categories and views, including causality and the external world (apart from consciousness), he affirms the reality of consciousness.

According to Śrīharṣa, all consciousness events are self-aware or self-revealing. Thus, consciousness knows itself, and this reflexive self-knowing is the only thing we need to know that consciousness is real. This view was commonly defended by the Yogācāra school of Buddhism, which defended the theory of self-reflexive awareness (svasamvedana).

Śrīharṣa also seeks to show through his many critiques of rational Nyaya thought that using rationality to attempt to understand ultimate reality is a futile act. Thus, he thinks that rational argumentation cannot prove the dualistic system of Nyaya nor can it prove non-dualism either. Instead, he says that the method of knowing non-duality is a subtle awareness of non-duality which arises from contemplation based on hearing the words and great sentences (mahavakyas) of the Upaniṣads.

One reading of the main idea of this text is that it seeks to show the instability of reason, and how any rational argument can be undermined by further reasoning. Thus, reasoning is always inconclusive. Because of this, Śrīharṣa argues that Nyaya logicians should stop doing philosophy and have faith in the liberating power of the Upaniṣads. Śrīharṣa is thus radically different from the Advaita philosopher Saṃkara, who held that reason can help us better understand ultimate truth. For Śrīharṣa, reason is useless, only faith and the Upaniṣads will lead us to the truth of non-duality.

== Poetry ==
Śrīharṣa composed the kāvya poem Naishadha Charita (IAST: Naiṣadhacarita) in 1174, during the reign of the Vijayachandra's son Jayachandra. According to Rājaśekhara's Prabandhakośa, upon the wide acceptance of Naishadha Charita, Śrīharṣa was dignified with the title Narabharati.

The Naishadha Charita contains erotic themes, but according to the 15th-century Jain scholar Nayachandra Suri, Śrīharṣa was actually a celibate, who had "conquered his sense organs" (jitendriya).

The Naishadha Charita was brought into Gujarat by Harihara during the reign of Vīradhavala to which Chandu Pandita in his Dipika, composed in 1296, refers to as a new poem and also to the commentary of Vidyādhara. Naishadha Charita was composed earlier than Khaṇḍanakhaṇḍakhādya in which text Sriharsha alludes to the works of Kalidasa.

== See also ==
- Nagarjuna (a Buddhist philosopher who wrote similar refutations of Nyaya)
- Jayarāśi Bhaṭṭa (a similar skeptic from the Carvaka school)
- Yogacara
- Philosophical Reflections in the Naisadhacarita
