= W. G. Archer =

British civil servant and art historian

William George Archer OBE
- Born: 1 February 1907
- Died: 6 March 1979 (aged 72)
- Education: School of Oriental Studies
- Occupations: Civil servant; District Magistrate; Superintendent of the Census; Museum curator; Art critic; Television presenter
- Employers: Indian Civil Service (1931–1947); Victoria and Albert Museum (1949–1959)
- Television: Monitor
- Spouse: Mildred Agnes Bell

William George Archer, OBE (1907–1979) was a British civil servant and art historian, and later museum curator.

== Career ==
Archer was born on 1 February 1907, and studied first history at Emmanuel College, Cambridge, and then Hindi, Indian history and law at the School of Oriental Studies in London. He subsequently served in the Indian Civil Service, in Bihar, from 1931 until around 1947, when India gained independence. His roles included District Magistrate and Superintendent of the Census. He ordered to shoot seven unarmed students who were trying to put the Indian flag on Patna secretariat during the Quit India movement. He was also Additional Deputy Commissioner in the Naga Hills from 1946 to 1948. While in India, he developed a love and knowledge of Indian culture, including poetry and art, and of the Santal people. In the summer of 1934, while home from India on sick leave, he married the sister of one of his friends, Mildred Agnes Bell, who returned to India with him (she later worked as curator of prints and drawings at the India Office). The couple, who had two children while in India, shared socialist politics and a belief that India should be granted independence.

After the family's return to England, they lived on Provost Road, north of London's Primrose Hill, and Archer served as Keeper of the Indian Section, at the Victoria and Albert Museum from 1949–1959, and afterwards Keeper Emeritus.

In the 1950s and 60s, he presented arts programmes on BBC Television, as part of the series Monitor. He was a champion of the Indian artist Avinash Chandra.

== Recognition and legacy ==
Archer was appointed an Officer of the Order of the British Empire (OBE) in the 1948 New Year Honours, and was awarded honorary doctorates by Panjab University in 1968 and Guru Nanak Dev University in 1976. In 1978, he received the Royal Asiatic Society of Great Britain and Ireland's Burton Memorial Medal.

He died on 6 March 1979.

His papers, together with those of his wife, are held by the British Library.

== Works ==
- Works by W. G. Archer at Project Gutenberg

=== Books ===
- The Blue Grove; The Poetry Of The Uraons. 1940.
- The Vertical Man. 1947.
- Kangra Painting. 1952.
- Bazaar Paintings of Calcutta: The Style of Kalighat. 1953.
- Garhwal painting. 1954.
- Indian paintings from Rajasthan. 1957.
- The Loves of Krishna in Indian Painting and Poetry. Ethical and religious classics of East and West, 18. New York: Allen and Unwin. 1957.
- Central Indian Painting. 1958.
- Archer, William; Paranavitana, S. (1958). Ceylon: Paintings from Temple Shrine and Rock.
- India and Modern Art. 1959.
- Indian Painting in Bundi and Kotah. 1959.
- Indian Miniatures. 1960.
- Kalighat Drawings. 1962.
- Paintings of the Sikhs. 1966.
- Kalighat Paintings: A Catalogue and Introduction. HMSO. 1971. ISBN 9780112900290.
- Indian Paintings from the Punjab Hills. London. 1973. ISBN 9780856670022.
- The Hill Of Flutes: Life, Love And Poetry In Tribal India: A Portrait Of The Santals. London: Allen & Unwin. 1974. ISBN 9780045720217.
- Songs for the Bride: Wedding Rites of Rural India. Columbia University Press. 1985. ISBN 978-0231059183. OCLC 11372032.
- Archer, William; Archer, Mildred (1994). India Served and Observed. London: BACSA. ISBN 978-0907799535.

=== Papers ===
- Archer, Mildred & W.G. Archer (1955) Natural history paintings. In Indian painting for the British 1770–1880, pp. 91–98. Oxford, Oxford University Press.
