= Prithviraj Raso =

Medieval Indian epic by Chand Bardai

- by Chand Bardai
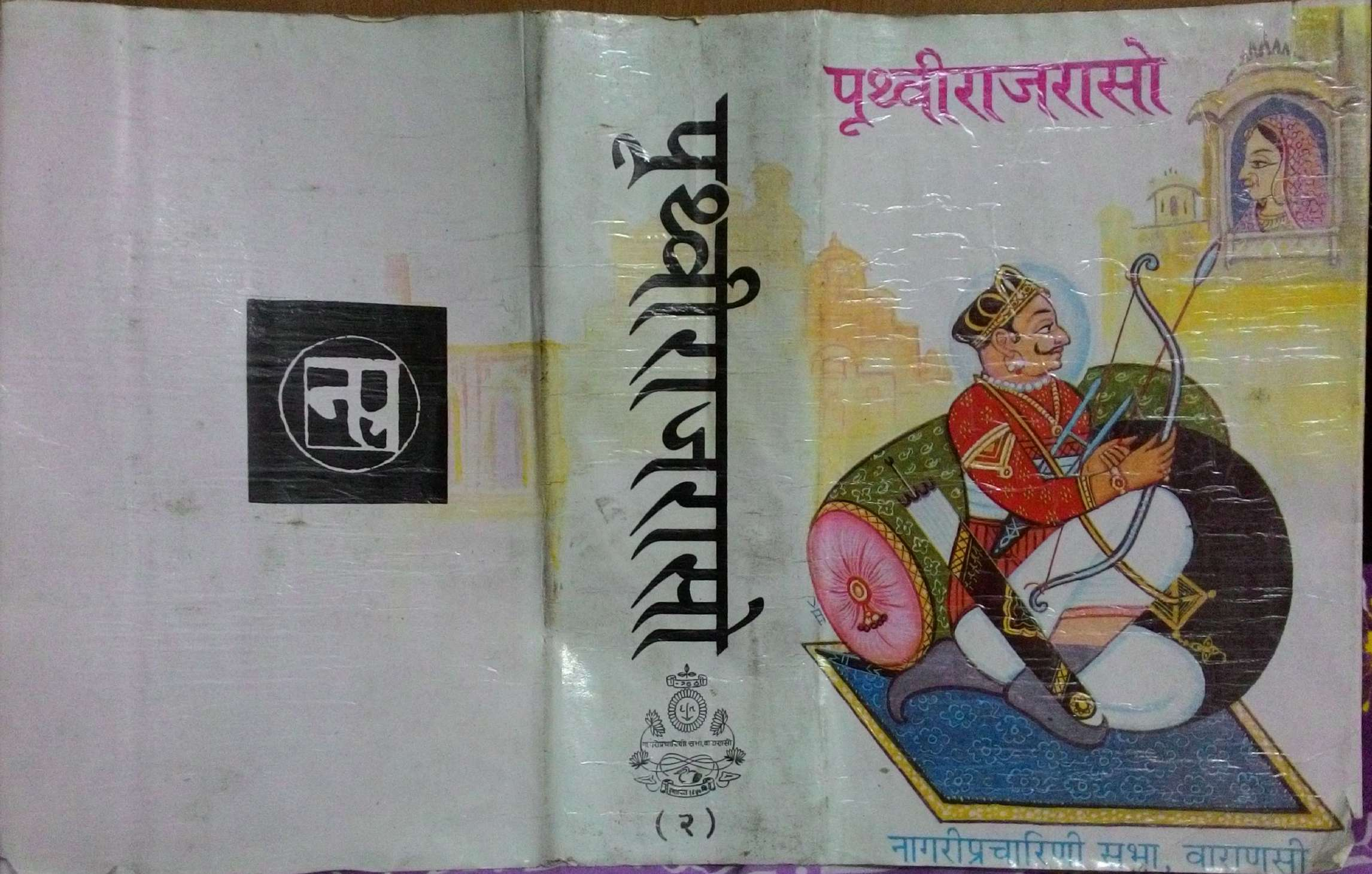
- The cover of a Prithviraj Raso version published by the Nagari Pracharini Sabha
- Language: Brajbhasha
- Genre: Epic poem

The Prithviraj Raso (IAST: Pṛthvīrāja Rāso) is a Brajbhasha epic poem about the life of Prithviraj Chauhan (reigned c. 1177–1192 CE). It is attributed to Chand Bardai, who according to the text, was a court poet of the king.

The earliest extant copy of the text dates back to the 16th century, although some scholars date its oldest version to the 13th century. By the 19th century, several interpolations and additions had been made to the original text under the patronage from Rajput rulers. The text now exists in four recensions. It contains a mixture of historical facts and imaginary legends, and is not considered historically reliable.

== Authorship and date ==
According to tradition, the Prithviraj Raso was composed by Chand Bardai, Prithviraj's court poet (raj kavi), who accompanied the king in all his battles. The last canto, which narrates the death of Chand Bardai and Prithviraj, is said to have been composed by Chand Bardai's son Jalha (or Jalhan).

Most modern scholars do not consider Prithviraj Raso to have been composed during Prithviraj's time. The text's language points to a date much later than the 12th century, and its current recension mentions the 13th century King Samarsi (Samarsimha or Samar Singh), whom it anachronistically describes as a contemporary of Prithviraj. However, some scholars still believe that Chand Bardai was a historical court poet of Prithviraj, and he composed a text that forms the basis of the present version of Prithviraj Raso.

The earliest extant manuscript of Prithviraj Raso, discovered at Dharanojwali village of Gujarat, is dated 1610. This manuscript contains the shortest recension of the text, and its language is more archaic than the one found in the other 17th-century manuscripts. This suggests that the shortest recension was most probably composed sometime before 1600, towards the end of the 16th century.

Scholars such as Narottamdas swami, Namvar Singh, and Cynthia Talbot date the text to the 16th century, during the reign of the Mughal emperor Akbar (r. 1556–1605). This theory is based on the fact that two narratives written during c. 1587-1597 are essentially summaries of the Prithviraj Raso plot: these narratives are contained in the Persian language text Ain-i-Akbari and the Sanskrit language text Surjana-charita. Some episodes contained in Prithviraj Raso (such as the existence of a minister called Kaymas or Prithviraj's defeat by the Ghurid ruler Muhammad of Ghor or Shihab-ud-Din Ghori) are mentioned in the earlier texts, but these earlier texts do not follow the storyline of the Prithviraj Raso. For example, the 15th century text Hammira Mahakavya, which appears to have been written for a Chauhan patron, does not mention the heroic episodes contained in the Prithviraj Raso. If such episodes were known during the 15th century, the author of Hammira Mahakavya would not have failed to mention them. This suggests that the Prithiviraj Raso narratives did not exist in the 15th century in oral form, as speculated by some writers.

== Recensions ==
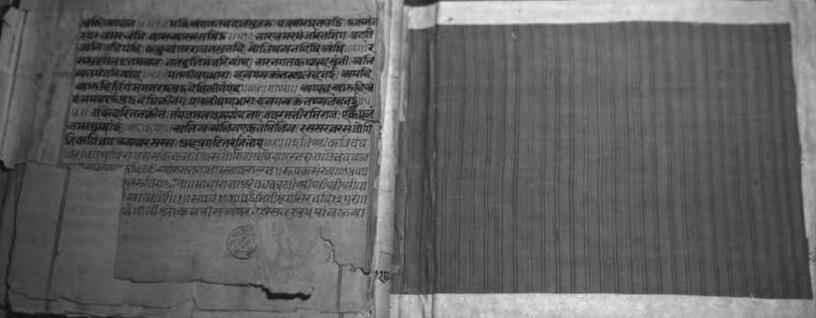
Prithviraj Raso manuscript, Maharaja Man Singh Pustak Prakash, Jodhpur

The oldest extant recension of Prithviraj Raso is from the 16th century. It exists in form a manuscript copied in 1610, for a grandson of Kalyanmal, the Rathore ruler of Bikaner. Scholars, such as Cynthia Talbot, Narottamdas Swami and Namwar Singh date the text to the 16th century, during the reign of Akbar. However Rima Hooja and other scholars of Rajasthan claim the core to have been written in Lata Apabhramsha (also called Latiya Apabhramsha) language and style typical of 12th and 13th centuries.

Since the 16th century, the size of the text has expanded greatly because of several interpolations and additions, resulting in multiple recensions. Only a small portion of the existing recensions is likely to have been part of the original version. A small 1300-stanza manuscript in Bikaner is closest to the original text. The longest available version is the Udaipur (Mewar) manuscript, which is an epic with 16,306 stanzas.

Modern scholars categorize the various recensions of Prithviraj Raso into four broad categories, represented by the following editions:

1. Shortest (laghutam) recension
  - Edited by Rajmal Bora, titled Candvardāīkṛt Prithīrājrāsau
  - Known from 2 manuscripts
  - The earliest manuscript is dated 1610, and was discovered at the Dharanojwali village of Gujarat; the other is dated 1640 (Samvat 1697)
2. Short (laghu) recension
  - Edited by Mataprasad Gupta, titled Pṛthvīrāj Rāsau
  - Known from 5 manuscripts
  - The oldest manuscript is dated 1613
3. Medium (madhyam) recension
  - Edited by Kavirav Mohansimha, titled Pṛthvīrāj Rāso
  - Known from 11 manuscripts
  - The oldest manuscript is dated 1635
4. Long (brhad) recension
  - Edited by Mohanlal Vishnu Pandya and Shyamsundar Das, titled Pṛthvīrāj Rāso
  - Developed under the patronage of the Mewar court in late 17th century
  - The most popular and the first printed version of the text is based on a 1703 manuscript commissioned by Amar Singh II in 1703

Several manuscripts deviate from these editions. For example, some manuscripts of the medium recension omit the episode of Prithviraj killing the Ghurid sultan Shihab-ud-Din Ghori. American academic Cynthia Talbot compiled a list of nearly 170 manuscripts of the text. The patrons of only 17 of these can be identified: they include kings and princes from the royal families of Bikaner, Amber (Jaipur), Kota, Jodhpur, and Udaipur; and a chief of Mewar. Few manuscripts provide information about their production; those that do indicate that such manuscripts were usually written by Bhat bards, Brahmins or Jains for Rajput patrons.

== Language ==
The classification of the text's language has been debated by scholars, as its language varies noticeably between the various recensions, and sometimes, even between the different portions of the same manuscript. The present version of Prithviraj Raso is composed primarily in Brajbhasha dialect, with some regional Rajasthani peculiarities. This language is sometimes called "Pingal" to distinguish it from Dingal, the language of Rajasthani poems. There may have been Punjabi influences in the original work, as the author, Chand Bardai, was from Lahore, however the current form of the work lacks any Punjabi influences.

Prithviraj Raso frequently uses the six-line "chappay" metre, which has "harsh, warlike connotations", and is more prevalent in Dingal than in Brajbhasha. The text features archaic vocabulary: this is especially true of the longest recension.

The various manuscripts use different proper names. For example, Prithviraj is variously called Prathiraj, Prathurav, Prithiraj etc.; and the Tomara dynasty is variously called Tanvar, Tauvar, Tunvar, and Tuar. The Ghurid king Shihab al-Din alias Mu'izz al-Din is called Sahabdin in the text.

== Plot summary ==
This is a summary of the shortest (Rajmal Bora) recension of Prithviraj Raso:

Prithviraj was born to the Chauhan ruler of Ajmer; his mother was the daughter of the Delhi ruler Anangpal Tomar. Anangpal was cursed with not having any male heir, because he had meddled with the iron pillar of Delhi. So, he appointed Prithviraj as the king of Delhi. Some time later, king Jaichand of Kannauj decided to conduct a Rajasuya ceremony to proclaim his supremacy. Prithviraj refused to participate in this ceremony, and thus, refused to acknowledge Jaichand as the supreme king.

Meanwhile, Jaichand's daughter Sanyogita fell in love with Prithviraj after hearing about his heroic exploits, and declared that she would only marry him. Jaichand arranged a swayamvara (husband-selection) ceremony for his daughter, but did not invite Prithviraj. Nevertheless, Prithviraj marched to Kannauj with a hundred warriors and eloped with Samyogita. Two-thirds of his warriors sacrificed their life in fight against the Kannauj army, allowing him to escape to Delhi with Sanyogita. In Delhi, Prithviraj became infatuated with his new wife, and started spending most of his time with her. He started ignoring the state affairs, particularly the threat from the Muslim invader Shihab al-Din Muhammad Ghuri.

Prithviraj's priest and the poet Chand Bardai brought the king to his senses. Although Prithviraj prepared for the battle against Shihab al-Din in a short time, he was ultimately defeated. Shihab al-Din imprisoned Prithviraj, and took him to the invader's capital Ghazni. There, Shihab al-Din had Prithviraj blinded. On hearing this, Chand Bardai traveled to Ghazni and tricked Shihab al-Din into watching an archery performance by the blind Prithviraj. During this performance, Prithviraj shot the arrow in the direction of Muhammad Ghori's voice and killed him. Prithviraj and Chand Bardai killed each other shortly after.

The long recension contains several additions. For example, it mentions that Anangpal demanded his kingdom back a few years later. After failing to regain it by force, he went on to sought support from Shihab al-Din. Prithviraj defeated both of them, and convinced Anangpal to retire. The largest recension also gives accounts of bravery of several noble chiefs like Jaitra Rai, Devrai Baggari, Balibhadra Rai, Kuranbh Ram Rai, Prasang Rai Khichi and Jam Rai Yadav, whom it describes as the military allies or associates of Prithviraj.

== Historical development ==
=== Similarities with Prithviraja Prabandha ===
Among the various medieval texts that mention Prithviraj Chauhan, Prithviraj Raso shares some similarities with the Sanskrit-language narrative Prithviraja Prabandha. Unlike other texts, the two texts feature three common characters beside Prithviraj and his Ghurid rival Shihab al-Din:

- Chand Bardai, the bard of Prithviraj in the Raso, appears as Chand Baliddika in the Prabandha.
- The Gahadavala king Jaichand appears as a rival of Prithviraj in the Raso. In the Prabandha, he is mentioned as Jaychand, and orders celebrations throughout his capital when he hears about Prithviraj's death.
- A minister of Prithviraj is called Kaymas in the Raso and Kaimbasa in the Prabandha.

Kaymas or Kaimbasa appears to have been a historical person, as he is mentioned under the name Kadambavasa in the Prithviraja Vijaya, which was composed during Prithivraj's reign. He is also mentioned in another text - the Sanskrit-language Kharatara-gaccha Pattavali (1336 CE). However, unlike these texts, the Prithviraja Prabandha mentions the king's attack on this minister - an episode also mentioned in the Prithviraj Raso.

In the Prithviraja Prabandha, Kaimbasa is not on good terms with Prithviraj's spear-bearer Pratapasimha. One day, he complains to the king against Pratapasimha, but the spear-bearer convinces the king that Kaimbasa had been supporting the king's Ghurid enemies. On a subsequent night, the king attempts to kill Kaimbasa with a bow and arrow in the dark, but Kaimbasa escapes. The king feigns innocence about the attack, but Chand Baliddika knows about the incident, and condemns the king in private. The next day, Prithviraj dismisses both Kaimbasa and Chand Baliddika from his service. Kaimbasa later helps the invading Ghurid king Shihab al-Din defeat and capture Prithviraj. While imprisoned, Prithviraj asks Kaimbasa for a bow-and-arrow to kill Shihab al-Din, but the minister betrays him by divulging his plan to Shihab al-Din. A statue is kept in the Ghurid Sultan's place: Prithviraj ends up shooting an arrow at the statue, and is later stoned to death on Shihab al-Din's orders. The text implies that Prithviraj had been blinded before his imprisonment, as he realises his failure to kill Shihab al-Din when he hears the sound of the statue breaking.

In the Prithviraj Raso, Kaymas falls in love with a slave from Karnataka, and visits the queen's palace to meet her at night, while the king is away on a hunting expedition. Prithviraj's Paramara queen sends him a letter complaining that Kaymas has been violating the privacy of the women's quarters. Prithviraj returns to the palace at night, and without any warning, attacks Kaimbasa with arrows. The first arrow misses Kaimbasa, but the second kills him. Prithviraj then secretly buries Kaymas along with his slave-lover, but Chand Bardai learns about the king's dishonourable act in a dream. Later, Prithviraj marries Samyogita, becomes obsessed with her, and starts ignoring the state affairs. He is subsequently defeated and blinded by the Ghurid king Shihab al-Din, but later kills the Ghurid king with an arrow during an archery performance, assisted by the bard Chand Bardai.

Frances Pritchett, a professor of South Asian Literature at the Columbia University, notes that the killing of Kaymas is one of the three key episodes integral to the plot of the original version of the Prithviraj Raso, the other two being the king's eloping with Samyogita, and his killing of Shihab al-Din. Pritchett notes that Prithviraj's shooting of Kaymas foreshadows his shooting of Shihab al-Din: in the first episode, Prithviraj demonstrates his ability to shoot at night with poor visibility in the dark; in the second episode, he repeats this feat when he is blind. There is also an insinuation that Prithviraj's unjustified murder of Kaymas led to his misfortune of being defeated and blinded by the Ghurids. The king's blindness can be seen as a metaphor: when he starts ignoring the state affairs after being infatuated with Samyogita, he "becomes blind, figuratively-speaking, to the dangers to his kingdom".

Unlike Prithviraj Raso, the Prithviraja Prabandha does not glorify Prithviraj. Here, his arrow misses Kaimbasa, indicating that he is not a phenomenal archer. Also, he dismisses his bard from his service, and his subsequent attempt to kill Shihab al-Din fails.

Prithviraja Prabandha and Prabandha Chintamani, both written by Jain authors, present Prithviraj as an inept and unworthy king. However, the Prithviraj Raso glorifies him as an admirable king. The similarities between Prithviraj Raso and Prithviraja Prabandha suggest that one of these texts borrowed from the other, but it is not clear which of these was authored first, making it difficult to trace the origin of the legend. It is possible that Prithviraj Raso is based on the earlier Jain narratives, and changed the story to present Prithviraj as a hero who took revenge on his enemy and died an honourable death. Alternatively, it is possible that the Jain texts borrowed the story from an older oral tradition which is the basis of Prithviraj Raso. Another possibility is that both the narratives may have been adapted from another, now-lost account.

=== The Mewar recension ===
The language of the texts available today largely appears to be post-15th century and to be based upon the 17th-century compilation commissioned by Amar Singh II, the Sisodia ruler of Mewar. Amar Singh's predecessors had commissioned re-working of Prithviraj Raso, probably beginning in the 1630s or 1640s, during the reign of Jagat Singh I. The version commissioned by Amar Singh was compiled by the poet Karuna-udadhi. Its manuscript, generally dated to 1703 CE, states that "stupid poets" had separated Chand Bardai's text into different parts: Karuna-udadhi wrote the current version by "picking through the strands" on the orders of Amar Singh. The resulting text is actually a revised text, which is very different from the earlier versions of the text.

This version appears to have been written as the part of a campaign to revive the Mewar dynasty's prestige, which had declined as a result of their setbacks against and later alliance with the Mughals. The Mewar recension enlarges and embellishes the role of the Mewar family in history, through their association with Prithviraj Chauhan. For example, it mentions Amar Singh's ancestor Samar Singh (Samarasimha) as the closest associate of Prithviraj Chauhan. On the other hand, the shortest recension of Prithviraj Raso does not even mention Samar Singh. The Mewar recension claims that Samar Singh married Prithviraj's sister Pritha, and fought alongside Prithviraj against Jaichand of Kannauj. Such claims are first made in two earlier Brajbhasha texts composed during the reign of Amar Singh's grandfather Raj Singh I: Rajvilas of Man and Rajaprashasti of Ranchhod Bhatt.

Unlike the shortest recension which mentions Samyogita as Prithviraj's only wife, the Mewar version claims that Prithviraj married 12 other princesses, many of them presented to him by his nobles. On the other hand, the Mewar family's Samar Singh is the only one who marries a woman from Prithviraj's family, thus highlighting Samar Singh's high status. The recension devotes an entire chapter to the marriage of Samar Singh and Pritha, describing how Prithviraj's father Someshvar decided to marry his daughter to Samar Singh, because of the Mewar's family's glory.

== Historical reliability ==
Because of the claim that Prithviraj Raso was written by Prithviraj's contemporary Chand Bardai, the text was historically regarded as an authoritative source. However, it contains a mixture of imaginary stories and historical facts, which it exaggerates for dramatic effect. The largest version of the text is especially known to contain several inaccuracies, and is of little historical value.

Since the 16th century, the Rajput rulers patronized Prithviraj Raso for its elements of heroic exploits, romance and revenge. Because of this, it became the most popular biography of Prithviraj among the Rajputs. James Tod, who introduced the text to the Western scholarship, characterised it as an authentic historical source but is today considered himself not to be reliable. As a result of James Tod's writings, Prithviraj Raso overshadowed other legendary texts about Prithviraj Chauhan (such as the Alha Khand and Prithviraja Vijaya). From 1900 onwards, several Hindi-language narratives based on Prithviraj Raso were published.

In 1886, Kaviraj Shyamaldas raised doubts about the text's historicity, finding faults with its chronology. These concerns were dismissed by those who saw Prithviraj Raso as an authentic indigenous text (as opposed to the Persian-language histories by Muslim writers). The Mewar State official Mohanlal Vishnu Pandya tried to prove the text as authentic using forged documents. Pandya's arguments were rejected by prominent scholars such as G. H. Ojha and Ram Narayan Dugar. As the research on medieval Indian history advanced, other problems with the text's historicity became apparent, and by the late 19th century, the consensus on the historical authenticity of Prithviraj Raso had broken down.

While not strictly history, the Prithviraj Raso is a source of information on the social and clan structure of the Kshattriya communities of northern India.

=== Examples of historical inaccuracies ===
Some examples of historical inaccuracies in Prithviraj Raso include:

- The text claims that Prithviraj's mother came from the Tomara family of Delhi. This is directly contradicted by the more reliable text Prithviraja Vijaya, which was composed during Prithviraj's reign. According to Prithviraja Vijaya, his mother Karpuradevi was a Kalachuri princess. The genealogy mentioned in Prithviraja Vijaya matches with the one given in the Chahamana inscriptions, and therefore, modern scholars reject the Prithviraj Raso claim.
- The text claims that Prithviraj's maternal grandfather Anangpal Tomar had no sons, and therefore, gave the kingdom of Delhi to Prithviraj. According to the text, Prithviraj thus became the king of Delhi even before he inherited the throne of Ajmer from his father. This is historically inaccurate, as Delhi was annexed to the Chahamana territory by Prithviraj's uncle Vigraharaja IV. Prithviraj inherited Delhi from his father Someshvara.
- After 1200, Ajmer's political importance had declined, and therefore, in order to present Prithviraj as an important political figure, the Prithviraj Raso presents Delhi as his capital. Earlier texts place Prithviraj in Ajmer: these texts include Sanskrit-language works such as Prithviraja Vijaya and Kharatara-gachchha-pattavali, as well as the Persian-language chronicles such as Taj al-Masir and Tabaqat-i Nasiri. The Tabaqat-i Nasiri explicitly mentions Prithviraj's feudatory Govind Rai ("Gobind Rae") as the ruler of Delhi.
- The long recension of the text claims that the Chaulukya king Bhima II killed Prithviraj's father Someshvara. Later, Prithviraj defeated and killed Bhima. This is known to be historically false, as the reign of Bhima lasted nearly half a century after Prithviraj's death. Also, Bhima was a baby at the time of Someshvara's death, and therefore, could not have killed him.
- The text claims that the Gahadavala ruler Vijayachandra defeated Bhola-Bhima of Pattanapura (Bhima II of Patan). However, Bhima II ascended the Chaulukya throne only in 1178 CE, after Vijayachandra's death.
- The text states that Prithviraja and princess Shashivrata fell in love after hearing about each other in the songs of a wandering bard. Shashivrata was the daughter of the Devagiri Yadava king Bhanu. She had a brother named Narendra. Bhanu arranged her marriage to Virchand (Virachandra), a nephew of Jaichand (Jayachandra), the Gahadavala king of Kannauj. Prithviraja marched off to Devagiri, and carried away Shashivrata against her father's wishes. The Chahamana army defeated the joint Gahadavala-Yadava forces. This legend is also historically inaccurate, as the Yadava capital at that time was Sinnar, not Devagiri. The contemporary Yadava ruler was Bhillama V, and he is not known to have any children named Shashivrata and Narendra. Moreover, there is no evidence of Chahamana and Gahadavala armies fighting a battle in the Deccan region.
- The text also claims that Vijayachandra defeated Mukunda-deva, the Somavanshi king of Kataka. Mukunda concluded peace by marrying his daughter to Jayachandra; Samyukta was the issue of this marriage. In reality, the Somavanshi dynasty did not have any king named Mukunda-deva, and they had already been displaced by the Gangas before Vijayachandra's ascension.
- The text mentions that Prithviraj defeated Nahar Rai of Mandovara and the Mughal chief Mudgala Rai. No historical records suggest existence of these persons.
- The longest recension claims that Samar Singh of Mewar was Prithviraj's bravest associate and married his sister Pritha. In reality, Samarasimha (Samar Singh) lived nearly a century after Prithviraj's death: his inscriptions date from 1273 CE to 1299 CE.
- The text claims that Prithviraj was taken to Ghazna as a prisoner, and managed to kill Muhammad of Ghor (Shihab al-Din) there. This is a fictional narrative: Muhammad of Ghor continued to rule for more than a decade after Prithviraj's death. Other historical records indicate that Prithviraj was taken to Ajmer after his defeat, and killed there on Muhammad's orders. Some manuscripts of Prithviraj Raso do not contain this episode.

The different recensions of the text also vary with each other. For example, the most popular recension of the text mentions the Agnikula legend, according to which Chahavana or Chahamana, the progenitor of the Chauhan dynasty, was born out of a fire-pit. However, the earliest extant manuscript of the text does not mention the Agnikula legend at all. It states that the first Chauhan ruler was Manikya Rai, who was born from Brahma's sacrifice.

== See also ==
- Puratana Prabandha Sangraha
- Samrat Prithviraj
- Prithviraj Chauhan
