= Harishchandra (Gahadavala dynasty) =

- Parama-bhattaraka Maharajadhiraja Parameshvara

King of Antaravedi
- Reign: c. 1194– ?
- Predecessor: Jayachandra
- Born: 10 August 1175
- Dynasty: Gahadavala
- Father: Jayachandra

Harishchandra (IAST: Harīścandra; 10 August 1175 – ?) was an Indian king from the Gahadavala dynasty. The last known king from the family's imperial branch, he probably ruled a part of his ancestral kingdom in present-day Uttar Pradesh.

== Early life ==
Harishchandra was a son of the Gahadavala king Jayachandra. He has been mentioned in two of his father's inscriptions, which suggest that he was born in about 1175 CE. An inscription dated 10 August 1175 CE (1232 VS) records a grant made on the occasion of the jatakarman (childbirth) ceremony of Harishchandra. Another inscription dated 10 August 1175 CE records a second grant made to celebrate the namakarana (naming) ceremony of Harishchandra.

== Reign ==
Find-spots of inscriptions dated to Harishchandra's reign (map of Uttar Pradesh)

After Jayachandra was defeated and killed in action against the Ghurids, Harishchandra succeeded him on the Gahadavala throne. He was around 19 years old at the time. According to one theory, he was a Ghurid vassal. However, in an inscription found at Kotwa (near Machhali Shahar), he assumes the traditional sovereign titles: Parama-bhattaraka Maharajadhiraja Parameshvara, Ashva-pati Nara-pati Gaja-pati Rajatrayadhipati, and Vividha-vidya-vichara-vachaspati. This inscription is dated 6 January 1197, and records the grant of a village by Harishchandra. It was issued from Chyavaneshvara-Ghatta on Ganga, at Dhanamvakra.

It is possible that Harishchandra continued to rule Kanyakubja (Kannauj) after Jayachandra's death. No contemporary Muslim historians mention that the Ghurids captured the city in 1193 CE. The Tabaqat-i Nasiri states that the Ghurid army marched towards Kannauj, but does not state whether it reached the city or not. According to it, Kannauj was captured only years later by Iltutmish (r. 1211-1236), who issued coins to celebrate this conquest. Other contemporary accounts, such as Taj-ul-Maasir and Kamil-ut-Tawarikh do not mention Kannauj among the places visited and sacked by the Ghurid army either. Firishta was the earliest writer to claim that the Muslims captured Kannauj in the 1190s, but his account can be ignored as inaccurate because he flourished several decades later, in the 16th century.

These evidences suggest that Harishchandra may have been able to retain a part of his ancestral kingdom, possibly including Varanasi.

An inscription dated 29 April 1197 CE, found at Belkhara in Mirzapur district, mentions that it was issued under the rule of a feudatory (ranaka) named Vijayakarna. It records the erection of a Ganesha pillar. The inscription does not mention Harishchandra, but states that it was issued in the "victorious kingdom of Kanyakubja", and mentions the usual titles of the Gahadavala kings. It is possible that a struggle was going on between Harishchandra and the Muslim generals at that time. In these uncertain times, Vijayakarna may have avoided explicitly naming a particular overlord in the inscription so as not to displease the rival of that overlord.

The ultimate fate of Harishchandra is not known, but he was probably defeated by the Delhi Sultanate under Iltutmish. A 1237 inscription issued during the reign of one Adakkamalla of Gahadavala family was found in Nagod State (present-day Satna district of Madhya Pradesh). It is possible that Adakkamalla was the successor of Harishchandra. Another possibility is that Adakkamalla was from a different branch of the dynasty. One of his ancestors might have been granted a small fief by his relative Govindachandra in the newly annexed Kalachuri territory. Nothing is known about Adakkamalla's predecessors or successors.
