= Patna School of Painting =

Style of Indian painting

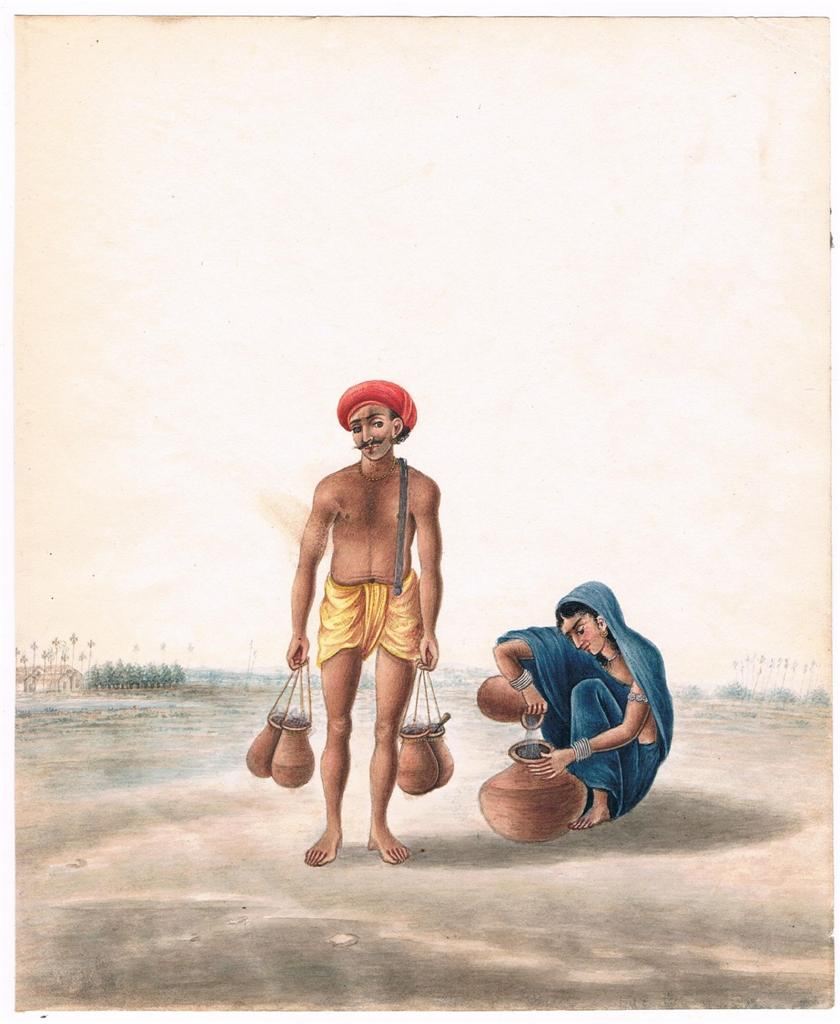
Bhisti (Water seller)

The Patna School of Painting (also Patna Qalaam, or Patna Kalam) is a style of Indian painting which existed in Bihar, India in the 18th and 19th centuries. The Patna School dealt almost exclusively with common people and their lifestyles, which helped the paintings gain in popularity. The principal centres of this style were in Patna, Danapur and Arrah.

The art historian, Mildred Archer said of the Patna School of painting that: "It marks the fusion of Eastern and Western taste which occurred in the nineteenth century and mirrors the interests and artistic fashions of the period. The school is, in fact, a summary of the complicated interplay of European and Indian cultures in the nineteenth century."

== History ==
The barrister and art collector Percival Chater Manuk of Patna wrote the first detailed research article on the history of the Patna School of Painting, its prominent artists, and various notable collections. This was after coming across a collection of work by the painter, Shiva Lal. This work was entitled the Patna School of Painting and was published in the Bihar Research Journal in 1943.

Patna Kalam is an off-shoot of both Mughal painting and of Company style art. The Mughal style of painting matured in the regime of Jahangir, and his period was considered the golden era of Mughal paintings, but during the rule of Aurangzeb in the late 17th and early 18th century, artisans faced mass prosecution and aversion in art and painting. The painters migrated from Delhi looking for shelter in different places. One such group moved eastward and landed in Murshidabad under the patronage of the Nawab of Bengal and other local aristocrats, though British patrons were also important.

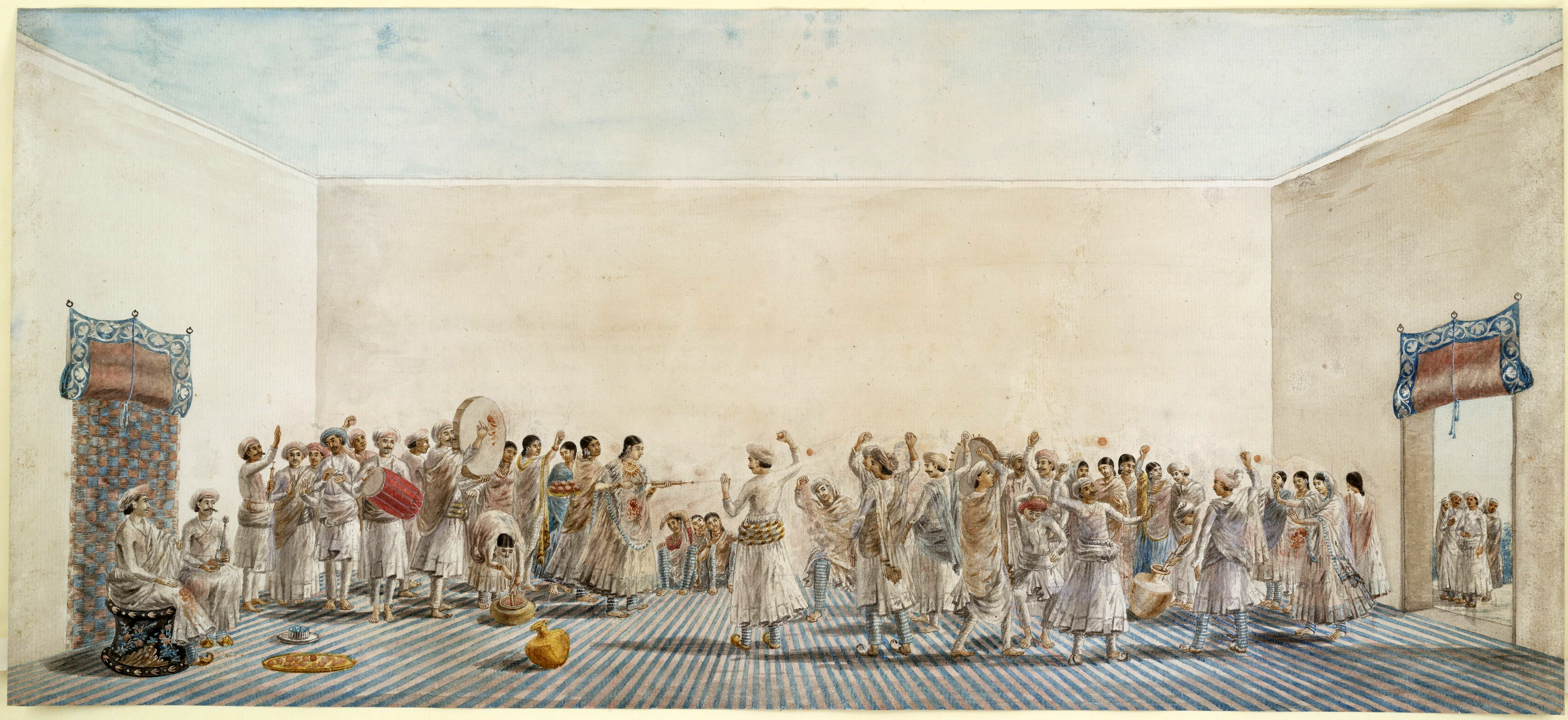
Holi being played in the courtyard, ca 1795 painting in Patna style.

In the mid-18th century, after the fall of The Nawab of Bengal and the subsequent decline of Murshidabad, the artisans started moving to the next biggest city in the east, Patna. In Patna they came under the patronage of local aristocracy and often Indophile scions of the early East India Company.

== Style ==
Patna Kalam is regarded as an off-shoot of Mughal painting, with influences from Persian and the Company painting style developed for British customers. The portraits can be clearly seen having colours and linings from Mughal style, and the shading can be seen to be adopted from the British style. Diverging from the Mughal and Persian style of wide and exquisitely decorated borders, Patna Kalam primarily focused on the subject of the painting.

Unlike Mughal paintings, which focused on royalty and court scenes, flag bearers of Patna Kalam were deeply influenced by the daily life of the common man, also a common subject in Company painting. Their main subjects were local festivals, ceremonies, bazaar scenes, local rulers, and domestic activities. The paintings were done on diverse surfaces such as paper, mica, and even ivory diskettes, that were used as brooches.

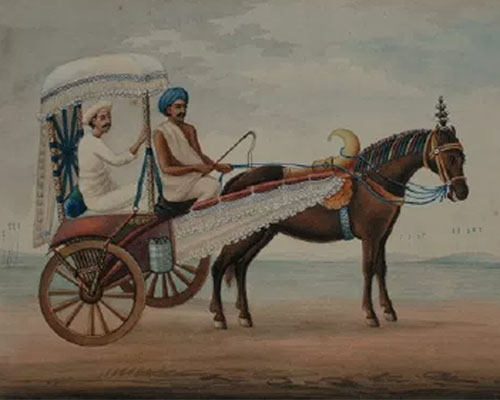
Tamtam (Horse-drawn carriage) – by Shiv Lal

A distinguishing characteristic of Patna Kalam is the minimal treatment of landscape foregrounds and backgrounds, which are given little emphasis. Another characteristic was the development of the shading of solid forms. Patna Kalam paintings are painted straightway with the brush without marking with a pencil to delineate the contours of the picture and the procedure of painting is popularly known as 'Kajli Seahi.'

== Legacy and decline ==
The distinctive style of the Patna School of Painting primarily gained prominence during the British colonial period and flourished until the mid-19th century. However, over time, the Patna School experienced a gradual decline, leaving behind a rich but fading legacy. The School was renowned for its unique blend of Mughal, Persian, and Indian artistic traditions. It primarily focused on illustrating mythological narratives, religious themes, and scenes from everyday life. The artists employed vibrant colours, intricate detailing, and delicate brushwork to create visually captivating works. One of the major factors contributing to the decline of the Patna School was the diminishing patronage and changing socio-political landscape. With the advent of the British Raj, the traditional Indian aristocratic patrons who had supported the art form started to lose their influence, leading to a decline in the demand for such paintings. However, the British too commissioned several works, which have not received enough scholarly attention, that can shed light on the nineteenth century socio-economic and cultural conditions of Patna.

Additionally, the emergence of modern art movements and the growing popularity of European art styles further marginalised the School. As the art world shifted towards new forms of expression and Western influences, the traditional Indian styles faced challenges in maintaining relevance and attracting a new generation of artists. Art historians have noted that the decline of the Patna School of Painting may also be perceived due to the lack of institutional support and documentation. Unlike other renowned art schools in India, the Patna School lacked a systematic approach to preserving its techniques, styles, and historical records. This dearth of institutional backing hindered its continuity and led to a gradual loss of knowledge and skills associated with the art form. Despite its decline, the legacy of the Patna School of Painting continues to resonate within the art world. Many scholars recognise its contribution to the development of Indian art and its unique synthesis of cultural influences. Efforts are being made to revive and reinvent interest in this fading art form through exhibitions, workshops, and research initiatives. Therefore, it would seem the legacy of Patna School lives on ensuring that future generations can appreciate and learn from its artistic contributions.

== Patna Kalam today ==
Some well-known painters of Patna Kalam were Sewak Ram, Hulas Lall, Shiv Lal, Shiva Dayal, Mahadeo Lal, and Ishwari Prasad Verma. There is currently no one to carry on the tradition. Only three collections of Patna Kalam paintings exist in Bihar, one at the Patna Museum and others at Khuda Baksh Library, Patna, and Patna University’s College of Arts and Crafts. The Patna Kalam flourished only as long as its Western patrons existed.

== Gallery ==
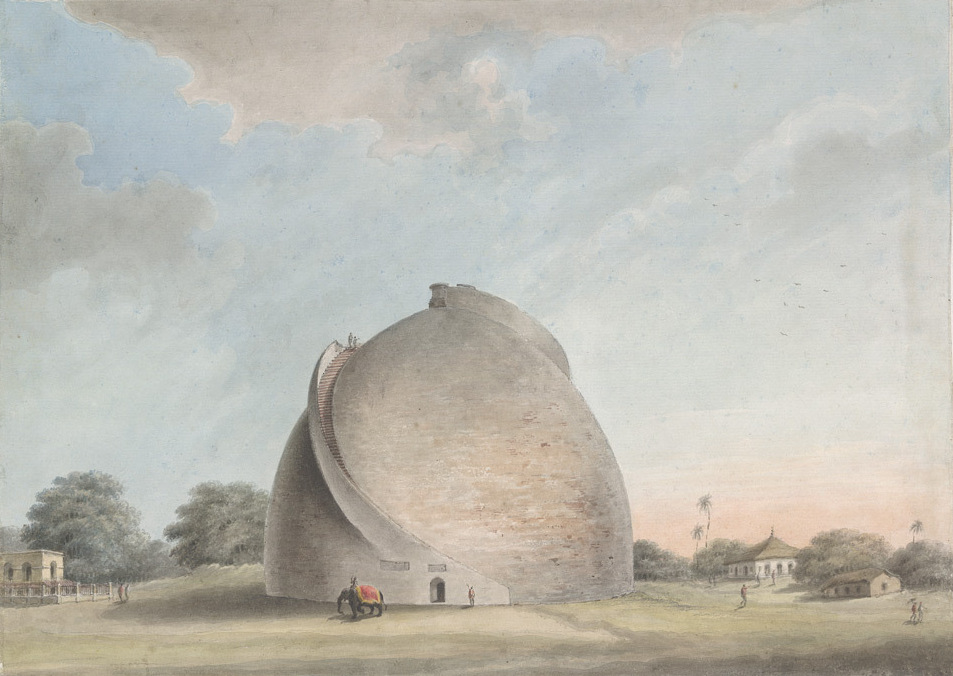
Gol Ghar, 19th Century Painting

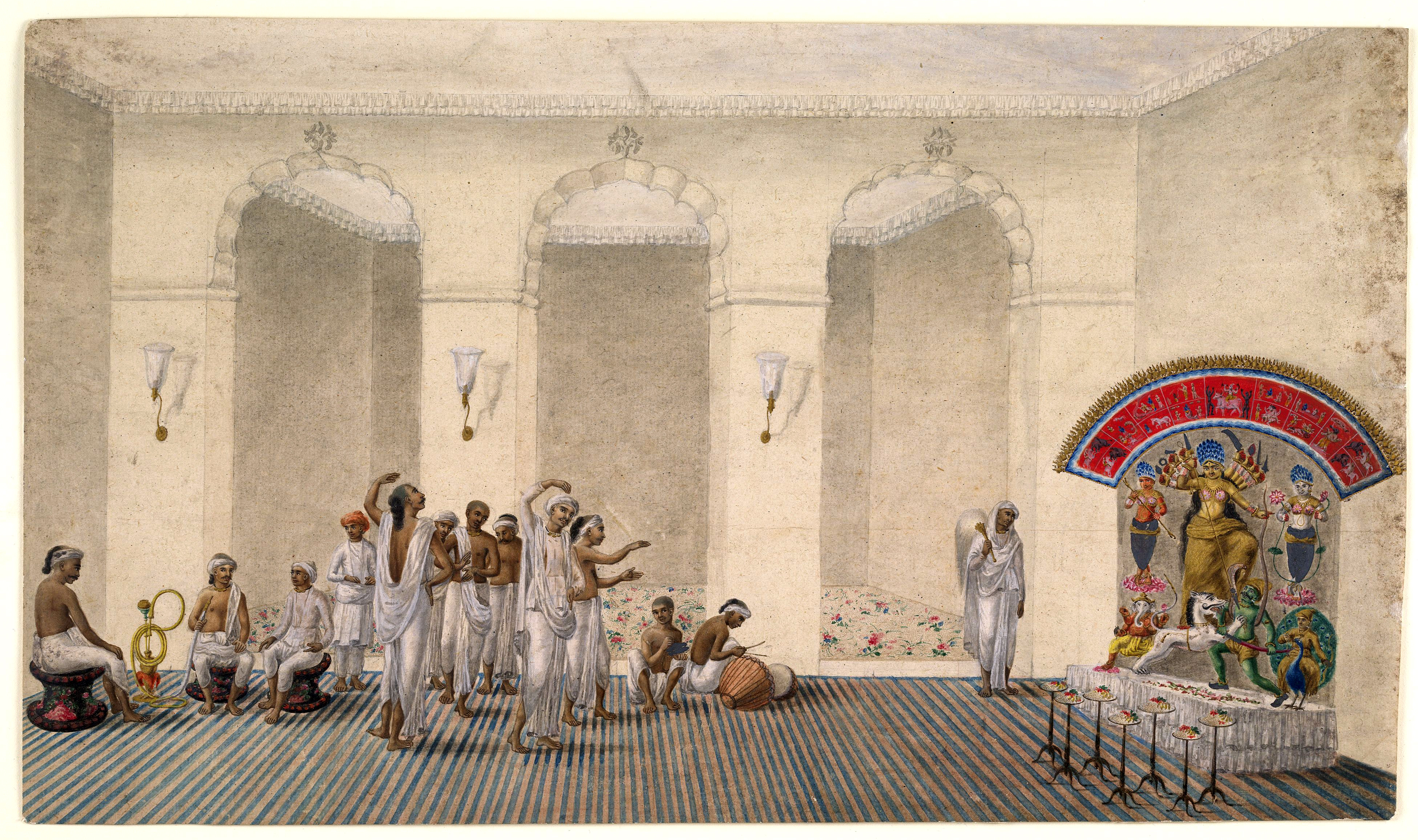
Durga Puja, 1809 watercolour painting in Patna Style

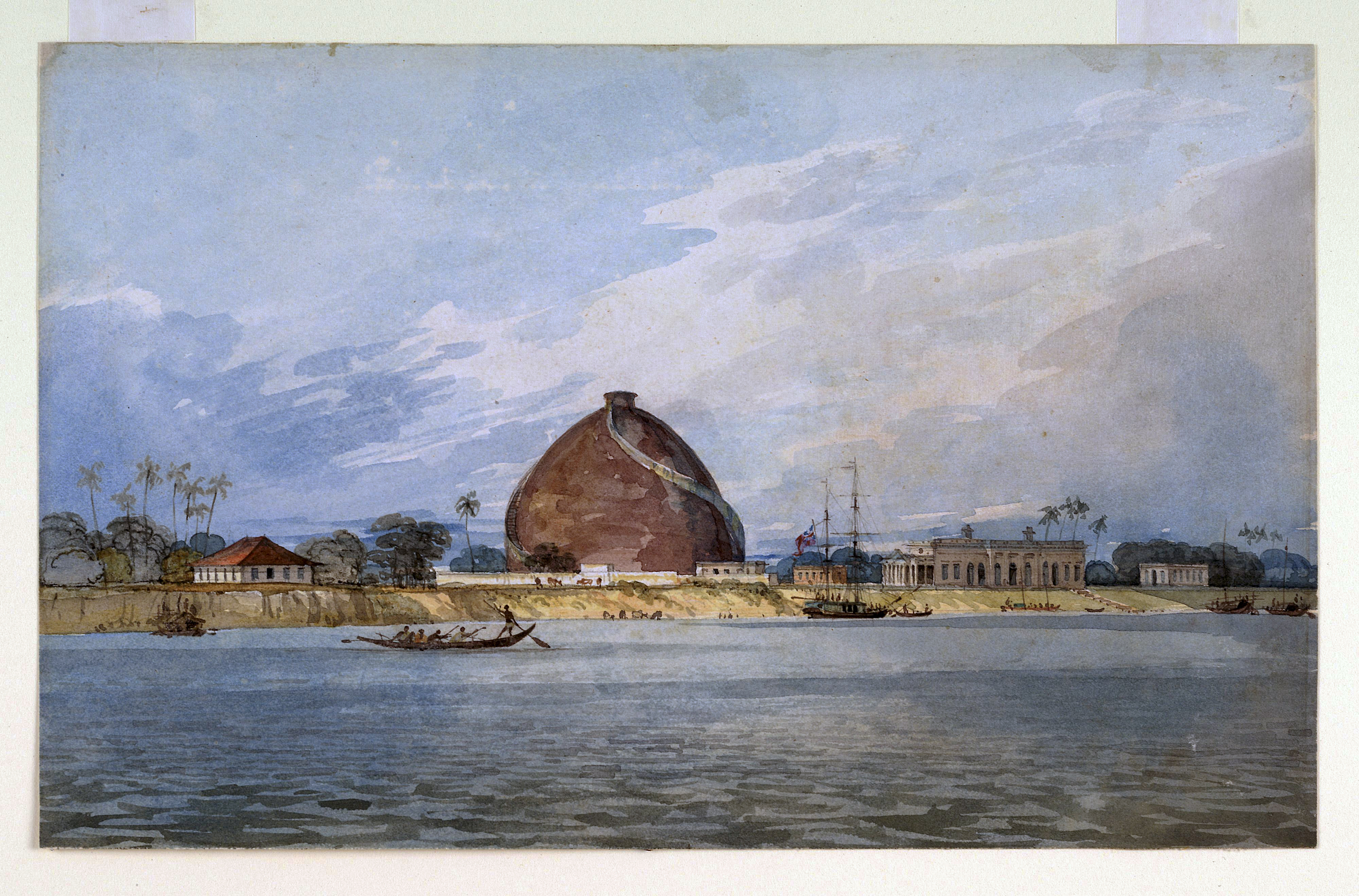
GolGhar, 19th Century Painting

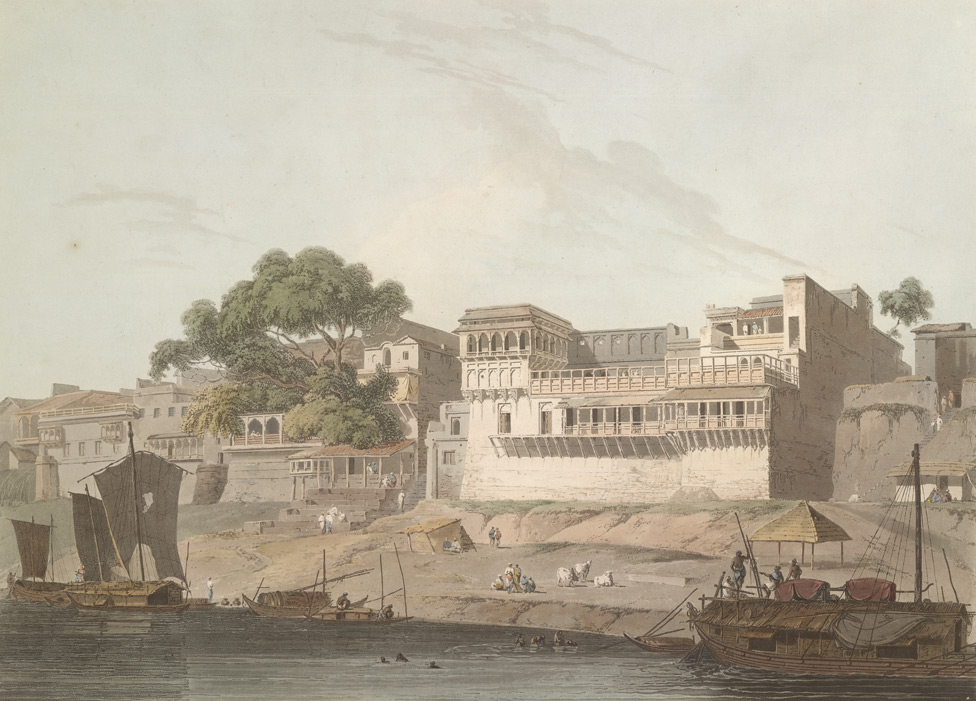
Patna along The Ganges

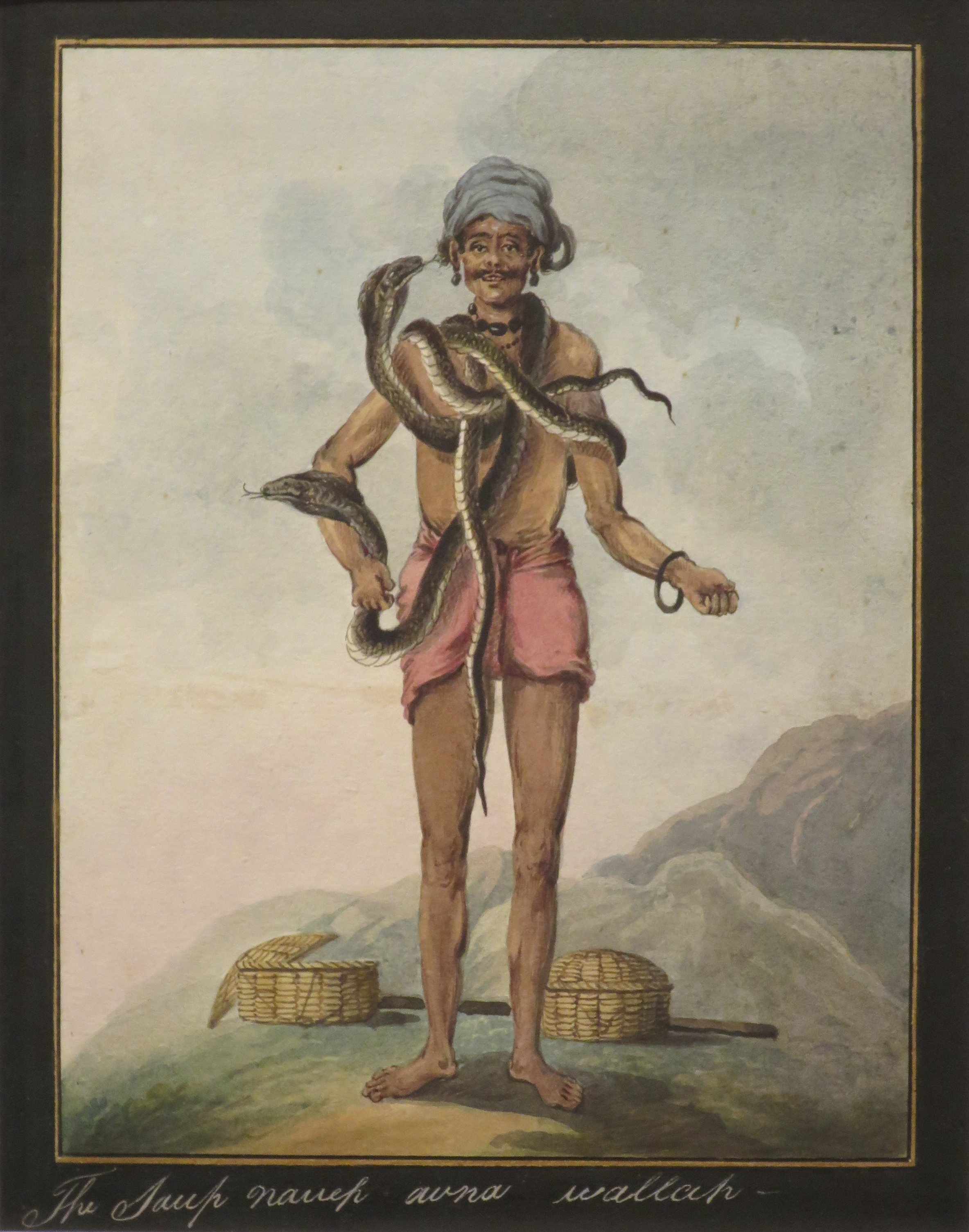
Snake charmer, 19th century
