= Jayachandra =

King of Gahadavala dynasty from 1170 to 1194

- Ashva-pati Nara-pati Gaja-pati Rajatrayadhipati; Vividha-vidya-vichara-vachaspati
- Statue of King Jaichand of Kannauj, Raja Jaichand Mounds, Kannauj

King of Antaravedi
- Reign: 21 June 1170 – 1194
- Coronation: 21 June 1170
- Predecessor: Vijayachandra
- Successor: Harishchandra
- Died: 1194
- Issue: Harishchandra
- Dynasty: Gahadavala
- Father: Vijayachandra

Jaya-chandra (IAST: Jayacandra; died 1194) was a king from the Gahadavala dynasty of northern India from 21 June 1170 until his death in 1194. He is also known as Jayachchandra (IAST: Jayaccandra) in inscriptions, and Jaichand in vernacular legends. He ruled the Antarvedi country in the Gangetic plains, including the important cities of Kannauj and Varanasi. His territory included much of the present-day eastern Uttar Pradesh and some parts of western Bihar. The last powerful king of his dynasty, he was defeated and killed in 1194 CE, in a battle near Yamuna against a Ghurid army led by Qutb ud-Din Aibak.

A fictional account of Jayachandra (as Jaichand) occurs in a legendary text Prithviraj Raso. The epic poem was likely written centuries after his death. According to this account, he was a rival of another Indian king, Prithviraj Chauhan. His daughter Samyukta eloped with Prithviraj against his wishes, and he allied with the foreign non-Hindu Ghurids to ensure Prithviraj's downfall. The name "Jaichand" became synonymous with the word "traitor" in folklore of northern India because of this legend.

== Early life ==
Jayachandra was a son of the Gahadavala king Vijayachandra. According to a Kamauli inscription, he was crowned king on 21 June 1170. Jayachandra inherited his grandfather Govindachandra's royal titles: Ashva-pati Nara-pati Gaja-pati Rajatrayadhipati ("leader of three forces: the cavalry, the infantry and the elephant corps") and Vividha-vidya-vichara-vachaspati ("patron of different branches of learning").

== Military career ==
Find-spots of inscriptions from Jayachandra's reign

Jayachandra's inscriptions praise him using the conventional grandiloquent terms, but do not mention any concrete achievement of the king. The records of his neighbouring Hindu kings (Paramara, Chahamana, Chandela and Kalachuri) do not mention any conflict with him either.

=== Sena invasion ===
The Sena king Lakshmana Sena is believed to have invaded the Gahadavala territory, but this invasion may have taken place after Jayachandra's death. If the invasion took place during Jayachandra's reign, the Sena king may have captured Magadha (present-day Bihar) from the Gahadavalas.

=== Ghurid invasion ===
The Muslim Ghurids invaded Jayachandra's kingdom in the 1193. The Muslim accounts describe Jayachandra as the Rāi of Banaras (King of Banaras). According to Ibn Asir's Kamil ut-Tawarikh, Jayachandra was "the greatest king of India and possessed the largest territory", and his army had a million soldiers and 700 elephants.

The Hindu accounts (such as Prithviraj Raso and Vidyapati's Purusha-Pariksha) claim that Jayachandra defeated the Ghurids multiple times. The contemporary Muslim accounts, on the other hand, mention only two battles: one relatively minor engagement and the Battle of Chandwar, in which Jayachandra was killed.

The Ghurid ruler Muhammad of Ghor had defeated the Chahamana king Prithviraja III in 1192. According to Hasan Nizami's 13th century text Taj-ul-Maasir, he decided to attack the Gahadavala kingdom after taking control of Ajmer, Delhi and Kol. He dispatched a 50,000-strong army commanded by Qutb ud-Din Aibak. Nizami states that this army defeated "the army of the enemies of the Religion" (Islam). It appears that the defeated army was not Jayachandra's main army, but only a smaller body of his frontier guards.

Jayachandra then himself led a larger army against Muhammad of Ghor who marched from Ghazni with an army of 50,000 cavalry in 1194. According to the 16th-century historian Firishta, Jayachandra was seated on an elephant when Qutb al-Din killed him with an arrow. The Ghurids captured 300 elephants alive, and plundered the Gahadavala treasury at the Asni fort. The identification of Asni is not certain, but most historians believe it to be the present-day Asni village in Fatehpur district. Afterwards, the Ghurids ransacked the city of Kashi (Varanasi) and destroyed several temples there. According to Hasan Nizami, "nearly 1000 temples were destroyed and mosques were raised on their foundations". A number of local feudatory chiefs came forward to offer their allegiance to the Ghurids.

Jayachandra's son Harishchandra succeeded him on the Gahadavala throne. According to one theory, he was a Ghurid vassal. However, in an 1197 CE Kotwa inscription, he assumes the titles of a sovereign.

== Prithviraj Raso Story ==
Jayachandra is a prominent character in the Braj language text Prithviraj Raso, many of whose claims at least regarding Jayachandra are unsubstantiated, historically inaccurate or clearly contradicted by evidence. According to the text, Jayachandra ("Jaichand") was a cousin of the Chahamana king Prithviraja III ("Prithviraj Chauhan"). Their mothers were sisters born to the Tomara king of Delhi. This claim is directly contradicted by the more reliable contemporary text Prithviraja Vijaya, according to which Prithviraj's mother had nothing to do with the Tomaras.

The text states that Jaichand's wife was a daughter of king Mukunda-deva, the Somavanshi king of Kataka. Jaichand's father Vijayachandra had defeated Mukunda-deva, who concluded a peace treaty by marrying his daughter to prince Jaichand. Samyukta was the issue of this marriage. This narrative is historically inaccurate: the Somavanshi dynasty did not have any king named Mukunda-deva. Moreover, the Somavanshis had already been displaced by the Gangas before Vijayachandra's ascension.

The text also talks of a conflict between Jaichand and Prithviraj. Neither Chahamana nor Gahadavala inscriptions mention any such conflict. The text claims that Jaichand assisted the Chandela king Paramardi in a battle against Prithviraj. The Chandelas were defeated in this battle. The inscriptional evidence confirms that Prithviraj defeated Paramardi, but there is no evidence for a Gahadavala-Chandela alliance. That said, it is known that Paramardi's grandfather Madanavarman had friendly relations with the Gahadavalas. It is also possible that Gahadavalas may have supported the Chandelas, because the Chahamanas were a common rival of these two kingdoms. This hypothesis notwithstanding, there is no evidence to suggest that Jayachandra and Prithviraja were rivals.

Prithviraj Raso further claims that Jaichand launched a digvijaya campaign (conquest in all directions). At the end of this campaign, he conducted a rajasuya ceremony to proclaim his supremacy. However, none of the Gahadavala inscriptions mention such a ceremony by Jaichand. The contemporary literary work Rambha-Manjari, which presents Jaichand as a hero, does not mention this campaign either.

According to the text, Jaichand also conducted a svayamvara (husband selection) ceremony for his daughter Samyukta. He did not invite Prithviraj to this ceremony, but Samyukta had fallen in love with Prithviraj, and decided to select him as her husband. Prithviraj came to the ceremony and eloped with the princess after a fight with Jaichand's men. This anecdote is not supported by any historical evidence either.

It is possible that Jaichand and Prithviraj were political rivals, as indicated by their non-cooperation against the Ghurid invaders. But the Prithviraj Raso claims that Jaichand not only refused to help Prithviraj against the Ghurids, but also formed an alliance with the invading Ghurid king Muhammad of Ghor. Although historians dispute the account in Prithviraj Raso, the name "Jaichand" became synonymous with the word "traitor" in Indian folklore.

== Inscriptions ==
Several inscriptions from Jayachandra's reign have been discovered, most of them in and around Varanasi. One of the inscriptions has been discovered at Bodh Gaya in present-day Bihar.

The inscriptions from Jayachandra's reign include the following:

Date of issue (CE)	Place of discovery	Issued at	Issued by	Purpose
21 June 1170	Kamauli, Varanasi district	Vadaviha	Jayachandra	Village grant
4 June 1172	Kamauli	Prayaga	Jayachandra	Village grant
21 November 1173	Kamauli	Varanasi: Near Adikeshava Temple	Jayachandra	Village grant
1174	Kamauli	Varanasi: Near Krttivasa Temple	Jayachandra	Village grant
1175	Kamauli	Varanasi	Jayachandra	Village grant
30 August 1175	Sehwar, Varanasi district	Varanasi	Jayachandra	Village grant
3 April 1177	Kamauli	Varanasi	Jayachandra	Village grant
9 April 1177	Varanasi	Varanasi	Jayachandra	Village grant (Godanti)
9 April 1177	Varanasi	Varanasi	Jayachandra	Village grant (Kotharavandhuri)
25 December 1177	Varanasi	Varanasi	Jayachandra	Village grant
11 April 1180	Varanasi	Randavai on Ganga	Jayachandra	Village grant (Dayadama)
11 April 1180	Varanasi	Randavai on Ganga	Jayachandra	Village grant (Saleti)
11 April 1180	Varanasi	Randavai on Ganga	Jayachandra	Village grant (Abhelavatu)
22 February 1181	Unknown	Varanasi	Jayachandra	Village grant
1186	Faizabad	Varanasi	Jayachandra	Village grant
1189	Myohar (or Meohar), Kaushambi district	Unknown	Vastavya Thakkura	Erection of Siddheshvara temple
1180s-1190s (1240s VS)	Bodh Gaya	Unknown	Unknown	Construction of Jayapura cave monastery

== Cultural activities ==
Jayachandra's court poet Bhatta Kedar wrote a eulogy titled Jaichand Prakash on his life, but the work is now lost. Another lost eulogy on his life is the poet Madhukar's Jaya-Mayank-Jasha-Chandrika (c. 1183).

== Religion ==
According to the 1167 CE Kamauli inscription, as a prince, Jayachandra was initiated as a worshipper of Krishna by the Vaishnavite guru Praharaja-Sharman. Nevertheless, after ascending the throne, Jayachandra assumed the dynasty's traditional title Parama-Maheshvara ("devotee of Shiva"). His Kamauli grant inscription states that he made a village grant and performed tulapurusha ceremony in the presence of the god Kṛittivāsa (an epithet of Shiva).

An inscription discovered at Bodh Gaya suggests that Jayachandra also showed interest in Buddhism. This inscription begins with an invocation to Gautam Buddha, the Bodhisattavas, and one Shrimitra (Śrimītra). Shrimitra is named as a perceptor (diksha-guru) of Kashisha Jayachchandra, identified with the king Jayachandra. The inscription records the construction of a guha (cave monastery) at Jayapura.

== See also ==
- La Malinche, Yanakuna, Benedict Arnold, Vidkun Quisling, similar terms associated with "traitors" in popular culture.
