= Vijayachandra =

King of Antaravedi from 1155 to 1169

- Ashva-pati; Nara-pati; Gaja-pati; Rajatrayadhipati

King of Antaravedi
- Reign: c. 1155–1169
- Predecessor: Govindachandra
- Successor: Jayachandra
- Died: 1169
- Spouse: Sundri
- Issue: Jayachandra; Valuka Rai
- Dynasty: Gahadavala
- Father: Govindachandra

Vijaya-chandra (IAST: Vijayacandra; died 1169) was an Indian king from the Gahadavala dynasty, ruling from 1155 to 1169. He ruled the Antarvedi country in the Gangetic plains, which includes a major part of the present-day eastern Uttar Pradesh, including Varanasi. He probably also ruled some parts of western Bihar through his feudatories. He is believed to have repulsed a Ghaznavid invasion.

== Early life ==
Vijayachandra was a son of Govindachandra, the most powerful king of the dynasty. He is also known as Vijayapala or Malladeva. The last extant inscription of Govindachandra is dated 1154. The earliest extant inscription of Vijayachandra is dated 1168. His last inscription is from 1169, while the first inscription of his successor Jayachandra is from 1170 CE. As Govindachandra had already ruled for 40 years by 1154, it can be assumed that his reign ended shortly after 1154. Vijayachandra must have ascended the throne around 1155, and ruled for approximately 15 years.

Besides Vijayachandra, Govindachandra had at least two other sons: Asphota-chandra and Rajya-pala. Asphotachandra bore the title Yuvaraja (heir apparent), as attested by an 1134 CE inscription. Rajyapala bore the title Maharajaputra (prince), as attested by the 1143 CE Gagaha inscription and the 1146 CE Varanasi inscription. It is not known why Vijayachandra ascended the throne when Asphotachandra was the yuvaraja. It is possible that the other two princes died during Govindachandra's lifetime, or that Vijayachandra defeated them in a war of succession, but there is no concrete evidence for either of these hypotheses.

The absence of any Gahadavala inscription between 1154 and 1169 is rather unusual for the dynasty. It may have been a result of the troubled times brought about by external invasions, or a war of succession among Govindachandra's sons.

Vijayachandra inherited his father's regnal titles Ashva-pati Nara-pati Gaja-pati Rajatrayadhipati and Vividha-vidya-vichara-vachaspati.

== Military career ==
Find-spots of inscriptions from Vijayachandra's reign, including those issued by possible feudatories (gray) in western Bihar

The 1169 CE Tara Chandi rock inscription, found near Sasaram, was issued by one Mahanayaka Pratapadhavala of Japila. It denounces an earlier fake grant of Kalahandi and Vadapila villages issued by Vijayachandra's officer Deu after taking a bribe. Historian Roma Niyogi theorized that Pratapadhavala was a feudatory of Vijayachandra. According to her, since there is no record of this region being a part of Govindachandra's kingdom, Vijayachandra may have captured it.

=== Ghaznavids ===
The Gahadavala inscriptions praise Vijayachandra using vague, conventional terms. According to them, the king swept away the world's suffering with tears from the eyes of Hammira's wife. "Hammira" (the Sanskritized form of Amir) refers to a Muslim general, possibly a subordinate of a Ghaznavid ruler. The Ghaznavid ruler could have been either Khusrau Shah or Khusrau Malik. The Ghaznavids had permanently lost Ghazna by their time, and were operating out of Lahore. Their attempts to expand eastwards may have brought them into conflicts with the Gahadavalas. The earliest extant inscription to mention this victory is from 1168, so the battle definitely took place before this year. The Chahamana king Vigraharaja IV had captured Delhi by 1164, and is believed to have expelled the Turushkas (Turkic people, that is, Ghaznavids). Therefore, the battle can probably be dated before 1164.

While fighting with the Ghaznavids, Vijayachandra may have ignored his western frontiers. This later resulted in a Sena invasion led by Lakshmana Sena.

=== Description in Prithviraj Raso ===
The historically unreliable Prithviraj Raso claims that Vijayachandra defeated Anangapala of Delhi. There is a possibility that Vijayachandra fought with Anangapala, the Tomara ruler of Delhi. However, there is no other authentic evidence to corroborate this claim. By 1164, Delhi had been captured by the Chahamana king Vigraharaja IV.

The text further claims that he defeated the Bhola-Bhima of Pattanapura, that is, Bhima II of Patan. However, Bhima II of the Chaulukya dynasty ascended the throne only in 1177, after Vijayachandra's death. Therefore, this claim is not accurate.

The text also claims that Vijayachandra defeated Mukunda-deva, the Somavanshi king of Kataka. Mukunda was forced to conclude peace by marrying his daughter to prince Jayachandra; Samyukta was the issue of this marriage. This claim is also wrong, as the Somavanshi dynasty did not have any king named Mukunda-deva. Moreover, the Somavanshis had already been displaced by the Gangas before Vijayachandra's ascension.

== Inscriptions ==
The following inscriptions from Vijayachandra's reign have been discovered:

Date of issue (CE)	Place of discovery	Issued at	Issued by	Purpose
19 April 1158	Rohtas district: Tutrahi waterfall (near Tilouthu)	Unknown	Pratapadhavala (probably a feudatory)	Unknown
16 June 1168	Varanasi district: Kamauli	Varanasi: Near Adikeshava Temple	Jayachandra (prince)	Village grant
1168-1169	Unknown	Vashishtha Ghatta on Yamuna	Jayachandra (prince)	Village grant
1169	Rohtas district: Phulwaria	Unknown	Pratapadhavala (probably a feudatory)	Road construction
Undated	Rohtas district: Phulwaria	Unknown	Pratapadhavala (probably a feudatory)	Records a pilgrimage to Tutrahi waterfall
16 April 1169	Rohtas district: Tara Chandi	Unknown	Pratapadhavala (probably a feudatory)	Denouncement of a fake grant
19 March 1169	Jaunpur district: Lal Darwaza mosque	Unknown	Bhattaraka Bhabi-bhushana	Unknown

== Cultural activities ==
Vijayachandra patronized scholars and poets, including Shriharsha, who composed a now-lost work called Shri-Vijaya-Prashasti. This text may have been a eulogistic biography of Vijayachandra. An inscription of Jayachandra states that reputed poets used to sing about his father's magnificence, which might be a reference to such eulogistic works.
