= Mildred Archer =

English art historian (1911–2005)

Mildred Archer OBE (28 December 1911 in London – 4 February 2005) was an English art historian who specialized in 18th- and 19th-century art in British India. She was curator of Prints and Drawings at the India Office Library and wrote extensively on the collection and studies on them.

Born Mildred Agnes Bell, she attended school in London. In 1930 she joined St Hilda's College, Oxford with a history scholarship. She met Bill Archer, who had been a friend of her brother at Cambridge. Bill had passed the Indian Civil Service examination and was in the School of Oriental Studies, London. Bill left for India in 1931 and the two were engaged just before he left. After marriage Bill worked in Bihar for nearly a decade and on his return to England he became Keeper of Indian Art at the Victoria and Albert Museum and was a leading scholar of Indian court painting and the Company style.

Mildred Archer's curatorial career began in 1954 with the cataloguing of the East India Company's collection of paintings in the collection of the India Office Library. It occupied her for 26 years.

Other works included Natural History Drawings (1962), British Drawings (1969), Company Drawings (1972), Indian Popular Painting (1977) and finally (with Toby Falk) Indian Miniature Paintings (1981). In 1979 she wrote British Portraiture 1770-1825. Her later publications included a study of the Daniell aquatints of India (1980), the V&A exhibition catalogue India Observed (1982), and studies of William Simpson's Indian sketchbooks (1986) and the prints and Company paintings associated with James and William Fraser (1989). Her last book was India Served and Observed (1994).

Her papers, together with those of her husband, are held by the British Library.

== Publications ==
=== Books ===
- Archer, William; Archer, Mildred (1994). India served and observed. London: BACSA. ISBN 978-0907799535.

=== Papers ===
- Archer, Mildred & W.G. Archer (1955) Natural history paintings. In Indian painting for the British 1770–1880, pp. 91–98. Oxford, Oxford University Press.
