= Kotwa =

- Census town
- Location in Varanasi district
- Coordinates: 25.336427°N 83.054931°E
- Country: India
- State: Uttar Pradesh
- District: Varanasi

Government
  - Type: Municipal corporation

Population (2001)
  - Total: 12,411

Languages
  - Official: Hindi
- Time zone: UTC+5:30 (IST)
- Vehicle registration: UP
- Website: up.gov.in

Kotwa is a census town in the Varanasi district of the Indian state of Uttar Pradesh.

== Demographics ==
Religion in Kotwa (2011)
Religion	Percent
Islam	80.76%
Hinduism	18.29%
Christianity	0.88%
Sikhism	0.01%
Buddhism	0.01%
Others	0.06%

As of 2001 India census, Kotwa had a population of 12,411. Males constitute 53% of the population and females 47%. Kotwa has an average literacy rate of 39%, lower than the national average of 59.5%: male literacy is 47%, and female literacy is 30%. In Kotwa, 23% of the population is under 6 years of age.
