= Siege of Kalinjar (1203) =

Part of Ghurid invasion of India

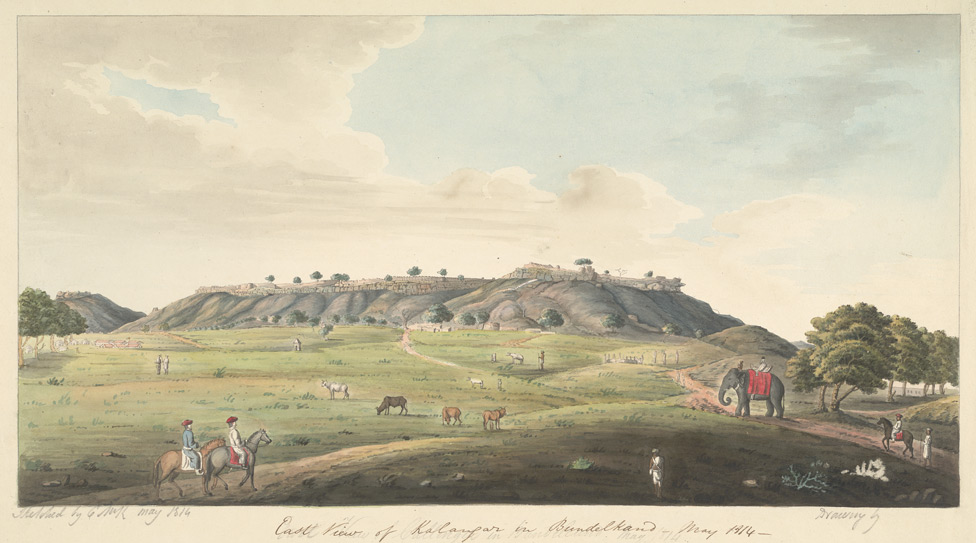
- Kalinjar Fort in 1814.
Date	12 April 1203
Location	Kalinjar, Chandelas of Jejakabhukti (present day in Banda, Uttar Pradesh, India 24.9997°N 80.4852°E
Result	Ghurid victory
Territorial changes	Kalinjar annexed to Ghurid Empire

Belligerents
Ghurid Empire	Chandel Empire of Jejakabhukti

Commanders and leaders
Qutb-ud-din Aibak; Iltutmish	Paramardivarman # Ajaya-Deva (surrendered)

Strength
Unknown	Unknown

Casualties and losses
Unknown	Unknown
- 50,000 inhabitants citizens were taken prisoners.
- Location within Uttar Pradesh Siege of Kalinjar (India)

The Siege of Kalinjar (1203 CE) was a important military campaign of the Ghurid Empire under the leadership of Qutb al-Din Aibak and Iltutmish against the Chandel Empire of Jejakabhukti. The Ghurids made large preparation and besieged Kalinjar fort, capital of the Chandela country with a huge army. The Chandela emperor Paramardi Varman gave stiff resistance but later retreated into the fort. Severe water shortages forced him to begin peace terms with the Ghurids, who agreed to accept tribute and withdraw. But, ruler died before the tribute was delivered. After his death, resistance continued for some time, but as the waters dried up, the general Ajayapala sought a peace treaty and surrendered the fort. As per the treaty, the Chandel Imperial family, elites, Chandela soldiers and Chandel clan withdrew safely to Ajaigarh. Thus, Kalinjar was captured on 12 April 1203, along with the seizure of considerable booty, horses, elephants, arms jewels, and 50,000 Hindu civilians were enslaved.

== Background ==
Kalanjara served as the military capital of the Chandelas of Jejakabhukti. When Prithviraja III Chauhan was killed after Second Battle of Tarain against the Ghurids in 1192 and Chahamanas (Chauhans) and the Gahadavalas were defeated, the Ghurid governor of Delhi planned to invade the Chandel Empire of Jejakabhukti and made large-scale preparations. A huge force led by Qutb al-Din Aibak, and accompanied by strong generals such as Iltutmish, besieged the Chandela fort of Kalanjara in 1202.

== Siege ==
Taj-ul-Maasir, written by the Delhi chronicler Hasan Nizami, states that Paramardivarman initially offered stiff resistance, but then retreated into the fort. Severe water shortages forced him to begin peace terms with the Ghurids and promised to pay a tribute, but naturally died before he could execute this agreement. His dewan Aj Deo (Ajaya-Deva) continued to resist the Ghurids after his death. But dewan was finally forced to surrender Kalinjar fort as the water reservoirs within the fort dried up during a drought. As per the treaty, the Chandel Imperial family, elites, Chandela soldiers and Chandel clan withdrew safely to Ajaigarh. Taj-ul-Masir further states that after the Ghurid's victory, Kalinjar was captured on 12 April 1203, they seized considerable booty, horses, elephants, arms jewels, and 50,000 Hindu male and female civilians were enslaved. Qutb al-Din Aibak appointed Hazabbar-ud-Din Hasan Arnal as the governor of Kalanjara and also captured Mahoba.

The 16th century historian Firishta states that Paramardivarman was assassinated by his own minister, who disagreed with the king's decision to surrender to the Delhi forces.

Firishta as well as Fakhruddin Mubarakshah state that the fall of Kalanjara happened in the Hijri year 599 (1202–1203 CE). According to Taj-ul-Masir, Kalanjara fell on 20th of Rajab, in the Hijri year 599, on Monday. However, this date corresponds to 12 April 1203, which was a Friday. Based on different interpretations of the historical sources, different scholars date the fall of Kalanjara to either 1202 or 1203.

== Aftermath ==
The Ghurids could not hold Kalanjara for long. Paramardi’s son, Trailokyavarman, defeated them at Kakadadaha before 1205 and recovered all lost territories including Kalanjara. His inscriptions (1205–1241) show his kingdom covered Lalitpur, Chhatarpur, Panna, Ajaigarh, and Rewa regions. In 1211–1212, he conquered Rewa and much of the Dahala-mandala area from the Kalachuris. Later Iltutmish's general Malik Nusrat-ud-din Tayasal invaded Kalanjara and plundered its towns but Trailokyavarman did not lose any territory. He was succeeded by his son Viravarman, whose earliest known date is 1254 AD.

== Bibliography ==
- R. K. Dikshit (1976). The Candellas of Jejākabhukti. Abhinav. ISBN 9788170170464.
- Rezavi, Syed Ali Nadeem (2002). "The Medieval Fort of Kalinjar and Its History". Proceedings of the Indian History Congress. 63: 1233–1259. ISSN 2249-1937.
