= Ramaipur Khurd =

- Village
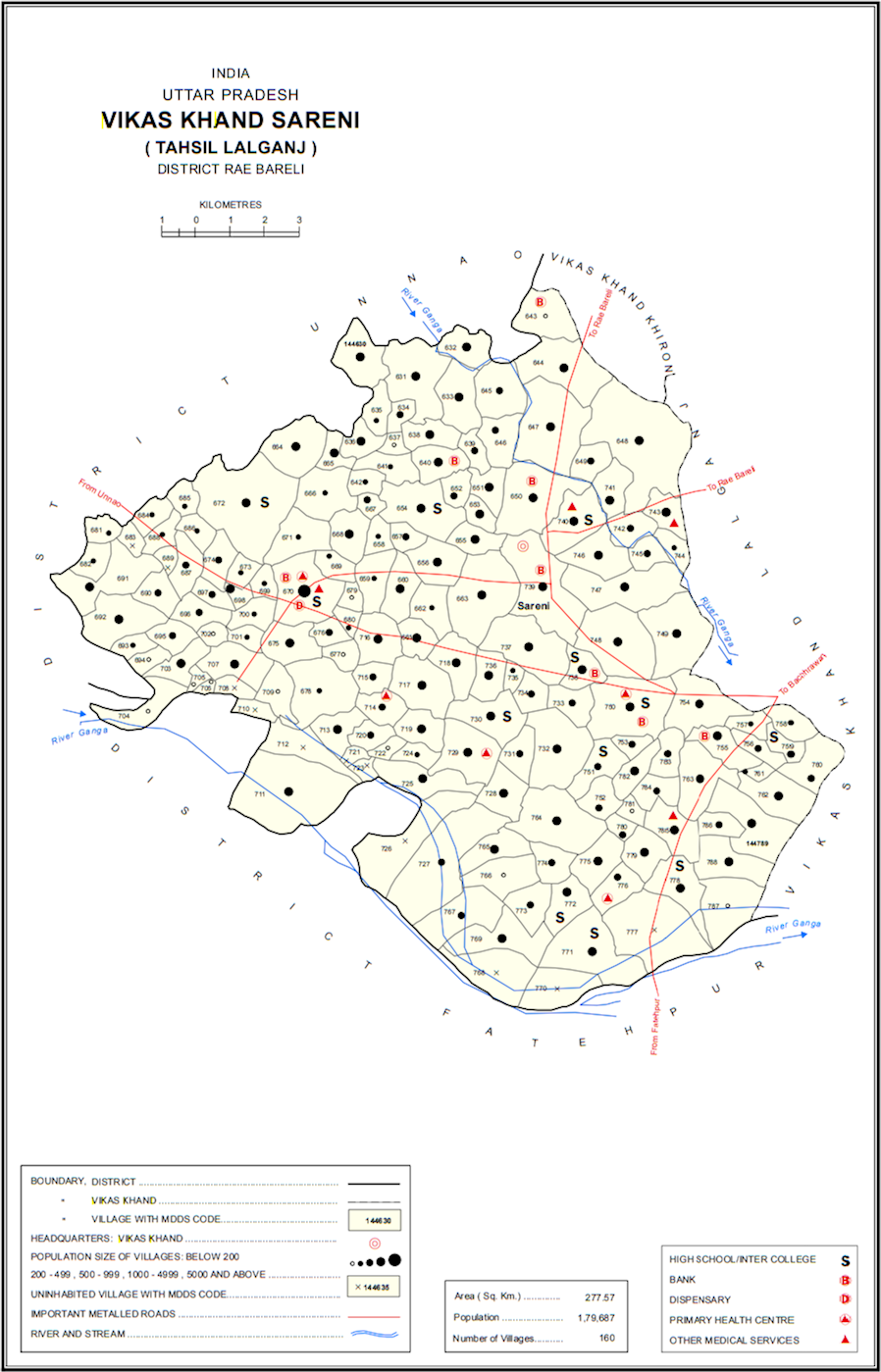
- Map showing Ramaipur Khurd (#786) in Sareni CD block

- Location in Uttar Pradesh, India
- Coordinates: 26.083061°N 80.872142°E
- Country: India
- State: Uttar Pradesh
- District: Raebareli

Area
  - Total: 0.769 km^{2} (0.297 sq mi)

Population (2011)
  - Total: 638
  - Density: 830/km^{2} (2,150/sq mi)

Languages
  - Official: Hindi
- Time zone: UTC+5:30 (IST)
- Vehicle registration: UP-35

Ramaipur Khurd is a village in Sareni block of Rae Bareli district, Uttar Pradesh, India. It is located 16 km from Lalganj, the tehsil headquarters. As of 2011, it has a population of 638 people, in 130 households. It has no schools and no healthcare facilities and does not host a weekly haat or a permanent market. It belongs to the nyaya panchayat of Sagar Khera.

The 1951 census recorded Ramaipur Khurd as comprising 2 hamlets, with a total population of 338 people (163 male and 175 female), in 67 households and 55 physical houses. The area of the village was given as 193 acres. 50 residents were literate, 48 male and 2 female. The village was listed as belonging to the pargana of Sareni and the thana of Sareni.

The 1961 census recorded Ramaipur Khurd as comprising 3 hamlets, with a total population of 389 people (189 male and 200 female), in 82 households and 67 physical houses. The area of the village was given as 193 acres.

The 1981 census recorded Ramaipur Khurd as having a population of 555 people, in 104 households, and having an area of 76.49 hectares. The main staple foods were given as wheat and rice.

The 1991 census recorded Ramaipur Khurd as having a total population of 610 people (332 male and 278 female), in 132 households and 132 physical houses. The area of the village was listed as 41 hectares. Members of the 0-6 age group numbered 94, or 15% of the total; this group was 53% male (50) and 47% female (44). Members of scheduled castes made up 35% of the village's population, while no members of scheduled tribes were recorded. The literacy rate of the village was 35% (172 men and 44 women). 234 people were classified as main workers (180 men and 54 women), while 2 people were classified as marginal workers (both women); the remaining 404 residents were non-workers. The breakdown of main workers by employment category was as follows: 120 cultivators (i.e. people who owned or leased their own land); 108 agricultural labourers (i.e. people who worked someone else's land in return for payment); 0 workers in livestock, forestry, fishing, hunting, plantations, orchards, etc.; 0 in mining and quarrying; 0 household industry workers; 1 worker employed in other manufacturing, processing, service, and repair roles; 0 construction workers; 0 employed in trade and commerce; 0 employed in transport, storage, and communications; and 5 in other services.
