= Expedition to Kalinjar (1531) =

Military campaign in 1531

Expendition to Kalinjar
Date	1531 A.D.
Location	Kalinjar 24.9997°N 80.4852°E
Result	Mughal victory

Belligerents
Mughal Empire	Bundela dynasty

Commanders and leaders
Humayun	Rudra Pratap Bundela (Prataprudra deo) (surrendered)

Strength
~Unknown	~Unknown

Casualties and losses
~Unknown	~Unknown
- Location within India

The Expedition of Kalinjar (1531) or Attack on Kalinjar (1531) led by Mughal Emperor Humayun was a crucial military campaign aimed at besieging the Kalinjar fort. At that time, the fort was under the rule of Rudra Pratap Singh Bundela of Bundelkhand, also known as Prataprudra Deo of Kalinjar. Humayun managed to bring the raja under Mughal suzerainty, transforming the fort into an advanced Mughal military base and strategic stronghold in northern India. This conquest significantly bolstered Mughal control over the region and expanded their territorial influence.

== Background ==
Within six months of ascending to the throne, Humayun took on the formidable task of besieging the fortress of Kalinjar in Bundelkhand. The ruler of the fortress was believed to have allegiances with the Afghans, prompting Humayun's military action to secure the strategic stronghold.

Raja Rudra Pratap Singh was a Bundela king of Kalinjar. Rudra Pratap sought to expand his territory, prompting Humayun to take punitive action against him and lead an expedition. Upon reaching Kalinjar, Humayun demanded the raja's surrender, but Rudra Pratap adamantly refused to comply.

== The Siege ==
Humayun advanced to Kalinjar, initiating a prolonged siege that endured for several months. Amidst this campaign, news regarding the emergence of Mahmud Lodi caused confusion for Humayun. Despite the challenging circumstances, Humayun persisted with the siege. Though the Bundela ruler had a formidable reputation for bravery, he eventually surrendered Kalinjar to Humayun following a month-long siege. In exchange for accepting Humayun's suzerainty, he was permitted to retain control of the fort.

== The Aftermath ==
In 1531, Humayun strategically sought to gain the acceptance of the fragmented nobility by making a play for Kalinjar. In negotiations with the Raja Rudra Pratap, from the house of Bundela, an offer of 6,720 tolas of gold was presented in exchange for peace. Humayun agreed to the terms and, in doing so, assumed the title of Ghazi for his perceived act of 'subduing an infidel'. After taking the surrender of Raja, Humayun marched out to suppress Mahmud Lodi whom he defeated and subdued.

== See also ==
- Siege of Kalinjar (1544)
- Siege of Kalinjar
