= Bhojavarman =

King of Jejakabhukti
- Reign: c. 1285-1288 CE
- Predecessor: Viravarman
- Successor: Hammiravarman
- Dynasty: Chandela

Bhojavarman (reigned c. 1285-1288 CE) was a king of the Chandela dynasty of central India. He ruled in the Jejakabhukti region (Bundelkhand in present-day Madhya Pradesh).

Bhojavarman succeeded Viravarman, whose last inscription is dated 1342 VS (1285-86 CE). As of 2003, six inscriptions from Bhojavarman's reign have been discovered: five at Ajaigarh (undated, 1343, 1344, 1345, 1346 VS); and one at Iashwarmau (1344 VS).

Places where inscriptions of Bhojavarman have been discovered (map of Madhya Pradesh)

The available inscriptions do not provide much information about Bhojavaraman's reign. They are either sati records or inscriptions issued by the families that served him. One of the Ajaigarh inscriptions was issued by Subhata, the Kayastha royal treasurer (Koshadhikaradhipati) and one of the king's counsellers (sachiva). The inscription refers eulogizes Subhata, and refers to the construction of a temple by him. This temple was most probably a now-ruined Shiva temple, which bears a short inscription mentioning one "Subhada-deva". Another 1344 VS Ajaigarh inscription mentions that Subhata commissioned images of Kedara-Parvati, Vrishabha, Krishna, Ambika, Tara, Tripura, Kamakshya, Durga, Harasiddhi, Aindri, Chamunda, Kalika and Ishvara-Parvati. Yet another Ajaigarh inscription mentions that Subhata's wife Devala-devi commissioned images of deities such as Shiva and Surabhi. One copper-plate inscription engraved below the upper gate of the Ajaigarh fort mentions other members of the same family. Another inscription describes the achievements of Ananda, a Kayastha military officer who had served Viravarman's predecessor Trailokyavarman.

Based on the inscriptions and the information available about his successors, it appears that Bhojavarman retained control of the important Chandela cities including Ajaigarh, Kalinjar and Khajuraho. He was succeeded by Hammiravarman after a short reign. The name of Bhojavarman has been omitted in the list of predecessors given in Hammiravarman's 1308 Charkhari copper plate inscription. The inscription mentions Bhojavarman's predecessors Paramardideva, Trailokyavarman and Viravarman. This indicates that Bhojavarman was not an ancestor of Hammiravarman. Rai Bahadur Hiralal theorized that the Bhoja and Hammira were brothers, but this assumption has not been corroborated by any other evidence. According to Eliky Zannas, the two kings were probably cousins, Hammiravarman being the son of Viravarman.
