= Kalinjar Fort =

Historical fort and temple complex in Uttar Pradesh, India

- Banda district, Uttar Pradesh, India; Near Karwi
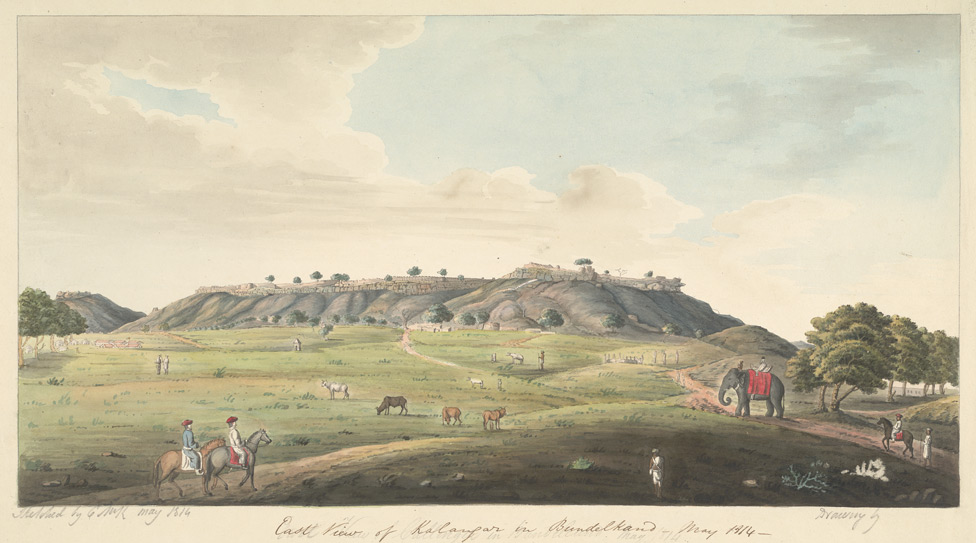
- A view of Kalinjar Fort

Site information
- Type: Fort, caves and temples
- Controlled by: Archaeological Survey of India
- Open to the public: Yes
- Condition: Ruined

Location
- Coordinates: 24.9997°N 80.4852°E
- Height: 1,200 feet (370 m)

Site history
- Built: 10th-12th century
- Built by: Chandela Empire
- Materials: Granite stones
- Demolished: 1858
- Battles/wars: Mahmud of Ghazni – 1023, Siege of Kalinjar (1203), Expedition to Kalinjar (1531), Sher Shah Suri – 1545, Maratha Peshwa – 1732, East India Company – 1812 and Indian Rebellion of 1857

Garrison information
- Past commanders: Chandel Empire, Sur Empire, Mughal Empire, Baghelas, Bundelas, Marathas, British
- Garrison: Various

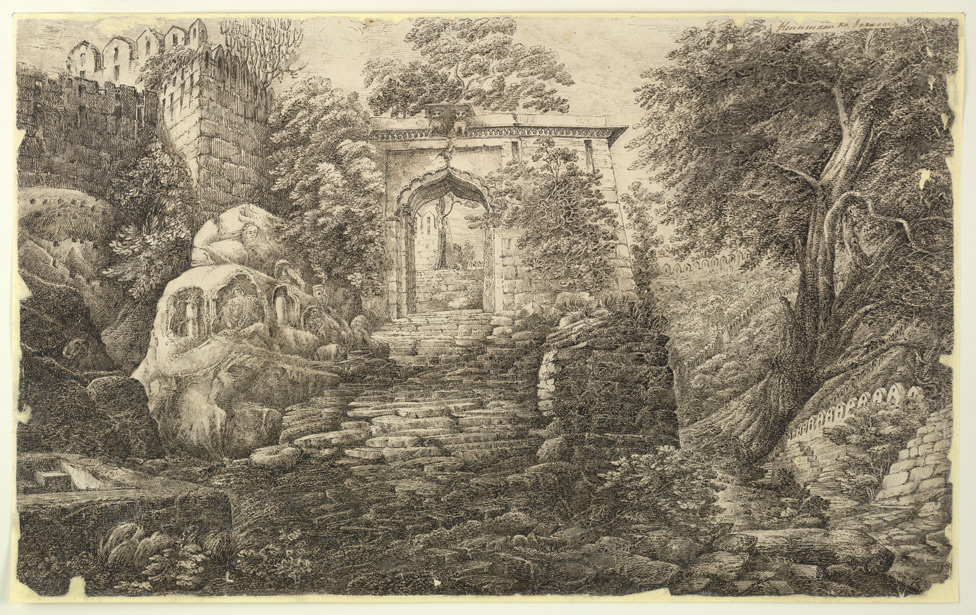
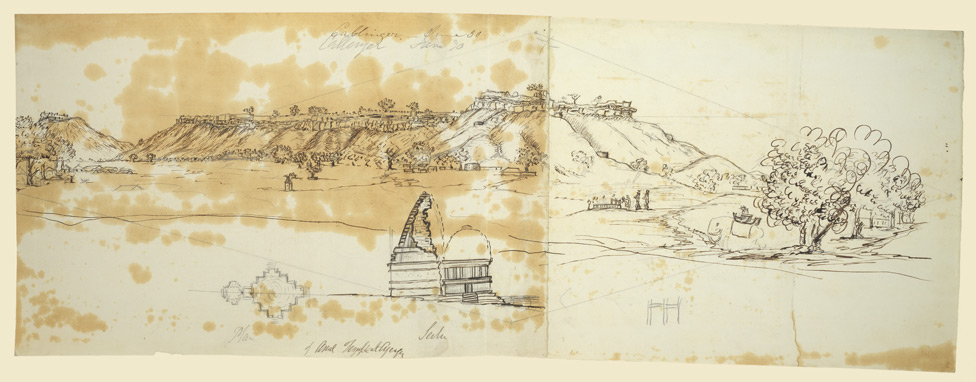
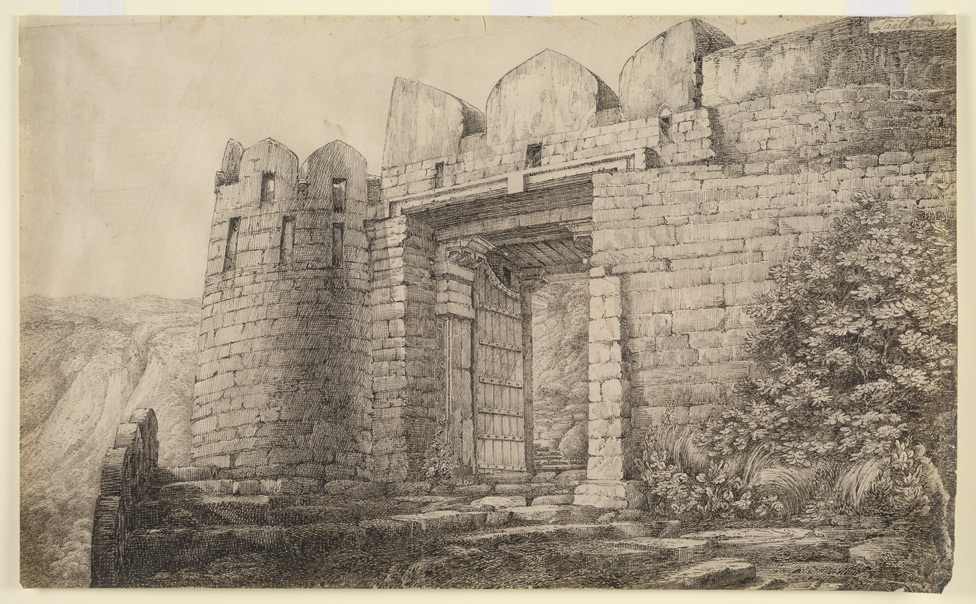
- : Hanuman gate; Kalinjar Fort; Laldarwaza

Kalinjar Fort (Sanskrit: कालंजर, IAST: Kālañjara) is one of the largest fortified cities in India. It was one of eight famous forts built by the Chandela emperors and served as the military capital of the Chandela Empire. The fort occupies an isolated rocky hill at the eastern end of the Vindhya Range, rising 1,203 feet (367 m) above sea level and 800 feet (244 m) above the surrounding plains. It now forms part of a National Geo-Heritage Site by GCI. Before its fortification by the Chandelas, Kalinjar was an important religious centre, and some of its earliest religious structures date back to the Gupta period. The Kālañjara-maṇḍala (Kalinjar region) was ruled by several dynasties before and after the Chandela Empire, including the Kurus of Chedi, Guptas, Pushyabhutis, Varmanas of Kannauj, Pratiharas, Rashtrakutas, Bundelas, Sur Empire, Baghelas, Mughal Empire, Marathas, and the British.

== Mythology ==
=== Name and entymology ===
Kalinjar was historically known as Kālañjara, from Sanskrit kāla, meaning "time". The 17th-century Mahābhārata commentator Nīlakaṇṭha Caturdhara interpreted the name as "one who destroys or subdues [the effects of] time". At least later on, this was connected to Shiva's role as the lord of time; for example, Kalinjar is mentioned in the opening lines of the Rauravasūtrasaṃgraha as the abode of Sadāśiva, "the lord of time... the creator of time, the knower of time".

The name is also attested in the Prakrit forms Kālaṃjara and Kāliṃjara in Jain texts.

=== Abode of Shiva ===
Kalinjar finds its mention in ancient Hindu mythological texts. According to Hindu legends, it is said that after the Samudra Manthan, when Shiva consumed poison that turned his throat blue, he came to Kalinjar and defeated kaal; i.e. achieved victory over death. This is why the Shiva temple at Kalinjar is called Neelkanth (blue-throated). Since then, the hill has been considered a holy site.

=== Mythological importance ===
Kalinjar was already an important pilgrimage centre in early times. It is mentioned three times in the Mahābhārata: twice in the Tīrthayātrāparva in Book 3 and once in the list of tīrthas in Book 13. The first reference in Book 3 describes Kālañjara as "a famous place where one should bathe at the Devahrada" and says that if one dies by performing prāyopaveśa (self-starvation at the end of life when old and ailing) at Kālañjara, one's ātman rises straight up to heaven. The second mention identifies Kālañjara as the site of Hiraṇyabindu, the ashram (spiritual retreat) of the revered sage Agastya. The reference in Book 13 mentions another place called Ṣaṣṭihrada at Kālañjara. These verses indicate the presence of one or more sacred pools at Kalinjar, which could refer to any of the many natural pools on the mountain. However, there is no indication in the Mahābhārata of any sort of connection with Shiva.

Another early mention is in the Harivaṃśa, which is considered an appendix to the Mahābhārata. The Harivaṃśa contains a story of seven Brahmins who are reborn at Kālañjara as seven deer who, after living lives devoted to dharma, remember their past lives at Kālañjara and die by performing prāyopaveśa. They are then reborn as cakravākas in a place called Sariddvīpa.

By the time of the Skanda Purāṇa's composition, Kalinjar had become a major centre of Shaivism: Kālañjara is included in the Skanda Purāṇa's list of Shiva's abodes, which says, "One who has seen the liṅga at Mount Kālañjara, the dwelling of Umāpati, obtains the result of an aśvamedha and reaches Rudraloka." The Skanda Purāṇa also includes the story of the seven Brahmins reincarnated as deer, albeit with some minor changes. The Skanda Purāṇa also contains the story of Shiva saving his devotee Śveta from death and making him one of his gaṇas (divine attendants); although this story is usually set at Kalinjar, most recensions of the Skanda Purāṇa do not mention Kalinjar explicitly, instead referring to it as "Krodheśvara", a name not used elsewhere. Two recensions of the Skanda Purāṇa, though, do explicitly describe this episode as taking place at Kālañjara. Several other Purāṇas also contain this story, such as the Kūrma Purāṇa, Liṅga Purāṇa, and the Viṣṇudharmottara Purāṇa.

Kalinjar is also included in the pañcāṣṭaka lists of Shaiva pilgrimage sites, which appear in many tantric sources (mostly from the Śaiva Siddhānta tradition), as well as the pre-tantric Śivadharmaśāstra.

Kalinjar is also mentioned in the Jain texts Uttarādhyayana and Āvaśyaka Sūtra as a mountain where the ascetic brothers Citta and Saṃbhūya were born as deer in their previous lives.

== History ==
=== Early history ===
By the Gupta period, Kalinjar had definitely become a site of Shiva worship: two terracotta seals from this period, found at Bhita near Allahabad, mention the name Kālañjara along with depictions of lingas, indicating the presence of a Shiva temple here. One of these seals mentions the name Bhadreśvara, which may be a reference to the Bhadreśvara temple at Kalinjar known from a later inscription.

A fragmentary inscription from the Chandi Darwaza at Kalinjar, possibly from the 8th or 9th century, refers to a temple called Bhadreśvara at Kalinjar, which it states was built sometime in the distant past by a king named Udayana. This king Udayana has been commonly assumed to be the ancestor of the Panduvanshī dynasty of Dakshina Kosala, but according to Peter Bishop it is probably instead a reference to the legendary king Udayana who is mentioned in the Bṛhatkathā as jumping to his death at Kālañjara after realizing the transitory nature of life. If this is the Udayana referred to in the inscription, then it would indicate that, by this period, there was a local tradition connecting Kalinjar and Udayana. It also indicates that the Bhadreśvara temple had a long history by this time. A couple of 9th-century inscriptions refer to the construction of a temple of Shiva and its subsequent visiting by pilgrims, which according to Syed Ali Nadeem Rezavi probably refers to the Nilakantha temple. Another undated inscription that appears to be from the pre-Chandela period mentions a family merchants, indicating "the presence of a wealthy trading community" at Kalinjar during this period.

A pre-Angkorian inscription from Prasat Preah Theat in Cambodia also refers to a linga called Kālañjaleśvara, which is probably a reference to Kalinjar.

The episode of the seven deer may be depicted at Kalinjar at a site called Mṛgadhārā, on the south side of the fort, where there are images of seven deer along with some Gupta-period inscriptions in the rock. These seven deer are also referred to in the local Kālañjaramāhātmya.

=== Medieval period ===
By the year 836, Kalinjar appears to have been under Gurjara-Pratihara control, but it changed several times in the mid-900s: first it was captured by the Rashtrakuta king Krishna III, and then it came under the Kalachuris of Tripuri. Sometime before 954, the Chandela dynasty under Yashovarman had captured Kalinjar from the Kalachuris. Later dynastic traditions claimed that Kalinjar was the Chandelas' place of origin, but contemporary inscriptions indicate that it was not their capital during this period. In inscription dated to 998, though, Yashovarman's son and successor Dhanga used the title Kālañjarādhipati, indicating that it had become his capital by then. From then on, Kalinjar is mentioned in almost every Chandela text or inscription.

In 1023, Mahmud of Ghazni attacked and received a tribute from Kalinjar. Around this time, al-Biruni mentioned Kalinjar, along with Gwalior, as "two of the most famous fortresses in India". In the late 11th century, an inscription from the reign of Kirttivarman records that the king's guru, Śrīmūrti, was responsible for the construction of the maṇḍapa of the Nilakantha temple at Kalinjar.

The 1100s seem to have been relatively peaceful for Kalinjar, and a lot of construction took place. Various inscriptions also attest to Chandela feudatories making pilgrimages to the Nilakantha temple during this century. The final additions to the Nilakantha temple were probably made around the turn of the 13th century, during the reign of Paramardi, who left an inscription here dated to 28 October 1201.

This period of prosperity was interrupted in 1202 or 1203 (599 AH) when the Ghurid general Qutb ud-Din Aibak led an army to besiege Kalinjar. Paramardi apparently surrendered and offered tribute to the Ghurids, but he died (or, in one version, was assassinated by his own prime minister) and the siege continuted. Finally, on 27 April 1203, the fort's garrison surrendered. However, although Kalinjar was put under a Muslim governor, some of its temples supposedly destroyed, and the whole place probably looted, Paramardi's successor Trailokyavarman was able to quickly reconquer it within a couple of years. A 1205 inscription refers to Trailokyavarman with the title Kālañjarādhipati once again, indicating that it was under Chandela control by this point.

In 1233/34, the Ghurid commander Malik Nusratuddin Taisi was tasked with leading an expedition against Kalinjar. Although Taisi does not appear to have actually captured the fortress, his army plundered the town below and carried off a vast amount of wealth. Trailokyavarman appears to have maintained control of Kalinjar, and his successor Viravarman certainly did as well. The final Chandela ruler, Hammiravarman, is also mentioned as Kālañjarādhipati in an inscription dated to 1289 (VS 1346). After the Chandelas, Kalinjar came under the Bundela dynasty for an unknown length of time.

=== Early modern period ===
In 1530, the future Mughal emperor Humayun led a campaign against Kalinjar and besieged it. This campaign is recorded in Gulbadan Begum's account, the Humayun-Nama, as well as an inscription on a rock below the Patalganga tank that consists only of Humayun's name and titles along with the date, corresponding to 30 March 1530. By 1545, however, Kalinjar had come under the control of the Baghela raja Ram Chand. That year, Sher Shah Suri led an army to take Kalinjar from the Baghelas, resulting in a pitched battle between the Suri army on one side and the Baghelas, assisted by their Bundela allies, on the other. During the battle, Sher Shah was mortally wounded by a gunpowder explosion from one of his own cannons, but he survived long enough for his soldiers to capture the fort. He was temporarily buried at Kalinjar, on a small hillock called Kalinjari to the east of the main fort, before being moved to his permanent tomb at Sasaram.

Sometime after Sher Shah's successor Islam Shah died in 1554, Kalinjar was reoccupied by Ram Chand Baghela, with Bundela assistance. In 1569, though, the Mughal emperor Akbar tasked Majnun Khan Qashqal, the governor of Manikpur, with recapturing Kalinjar, and after a siege, Ram Chand had to surrender due to lack of water. Kalinjar was then under Mughal rule until its capture by the Marathas. It played a prominent part in history down to the time of the Revolt of 1857, when it was held by a small British garrison. Both the fort and the town, which stands at the foot of the hill, are of interest to the antiquary on account of the remains of temples, sculptures, inscriptions, and caves.

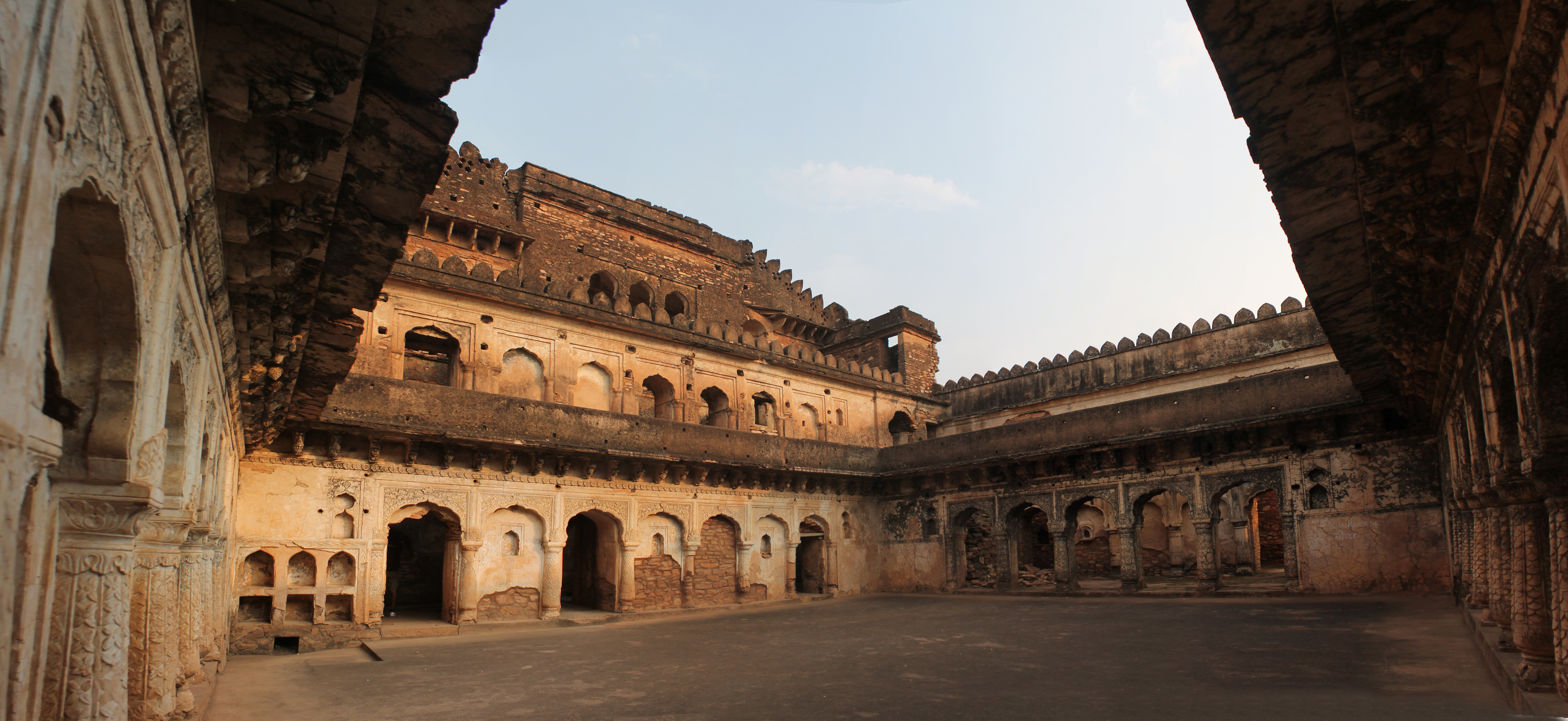
Panoramic view of Inside Rani Mahal, Kalinjar fort

In the early 18th century, the fort was captured by the Peshwa Bajirao after defeating the Mughal general Bangash Khan of Allahabad. In order to stop the Mughals from entering Bundelkhand again, he established a Maratha light infantry huzurat of 5000 under the command of Sardar Ram Singh Bhatt, Yashwantrao Bhatt, Parshuram Bhau Bundela, Bhaskar Pandit, and Sheshrao Pant Bundela, all veterans of war and Maratha class one generals. In due course of time, the Marathas conquered the nearby territories and expanded to the Bengal frontiers. They inflicted a crushing defeat on Awadh ally Nawab of Rampur and Ala Vardi Khan.

The fort was used to levy chauth to nearby territories like Benares, Mirzapur, Pratapgarh, Kunda, and Bundela.

=== Colonial period ===
In 1803, the Peshwa was involved in direct skirmishes with the East India Company in which he was defeated. In the Treaty of Surji-Anjangaon, Peshwa Bajirao II ceded Bundelkhand to the East India Company after his defeat in the Second Anglo-Maratha war. The fort came under the management of the East India Company in 1805–06. The Old Bhatt royalty was expatriated and was granted separate sanads of Kirwi, Attra, Chitrakut Mathond, and Khurand.

The fort was placed under the pre-Maratha constitution of Bundela - Jhijhotiya Chubes. However, during the first War of Independence in 1857, The Old Bhatta Aristocracy recaptured the fort driving Bundela back to Ajaygarh. In 1858, the British attacked the fort but the people at large resisted and fought a tough battle with Major Hugh Rose. A long drawn siege ensued in which almost 800 British and 3000 Indians were killed. This proved to be the toughest battlefield in Bundelkhand where English suffered maximum casualties. The English with the help of the states of Panna and Rewa captured this fort on 4 May 1858. The Last Bhatta Peshwas surrendered and were sent to Rewa as prisoners. Kalinjar subah was distributed in between Bundela, Rewa Solanki and Chaubes of Rajaula. The fort was decommissioned and its buildings were demolished, to prevent any further maratha garrisoning at Kalinjar, thus ending the legacy of this fort. The total chauth collection was estimated at 40 lakh shahi mohars. The Naukahai campaign of Rewa and Chunar Fort, was launched directly from Kalinjar in which the Sohagpur Amarkantak and Shahdol paragana were attached to Peshwa territories. Almost all the occupants of the fort were moon worshipers and are called Chandravanshi clans of Kshatriya, Brahmanas, Kalchuries and Yadavas.

In 1812, the British troops marched into Bundelkhand, and after a long battle, they were able to annex the fort. The British seizure of Kalinjar proved to be a great watershed, transferring the legacy of the old aristocracy into the hands of the new bureaucracy of officials, who showed their loyalty to British imperialism by damaging the captured fort. The damages caused to the fort can still be seen on its walls and open spaces.

=== Structures in the Fort ===
Following structures have been identified in the fort.

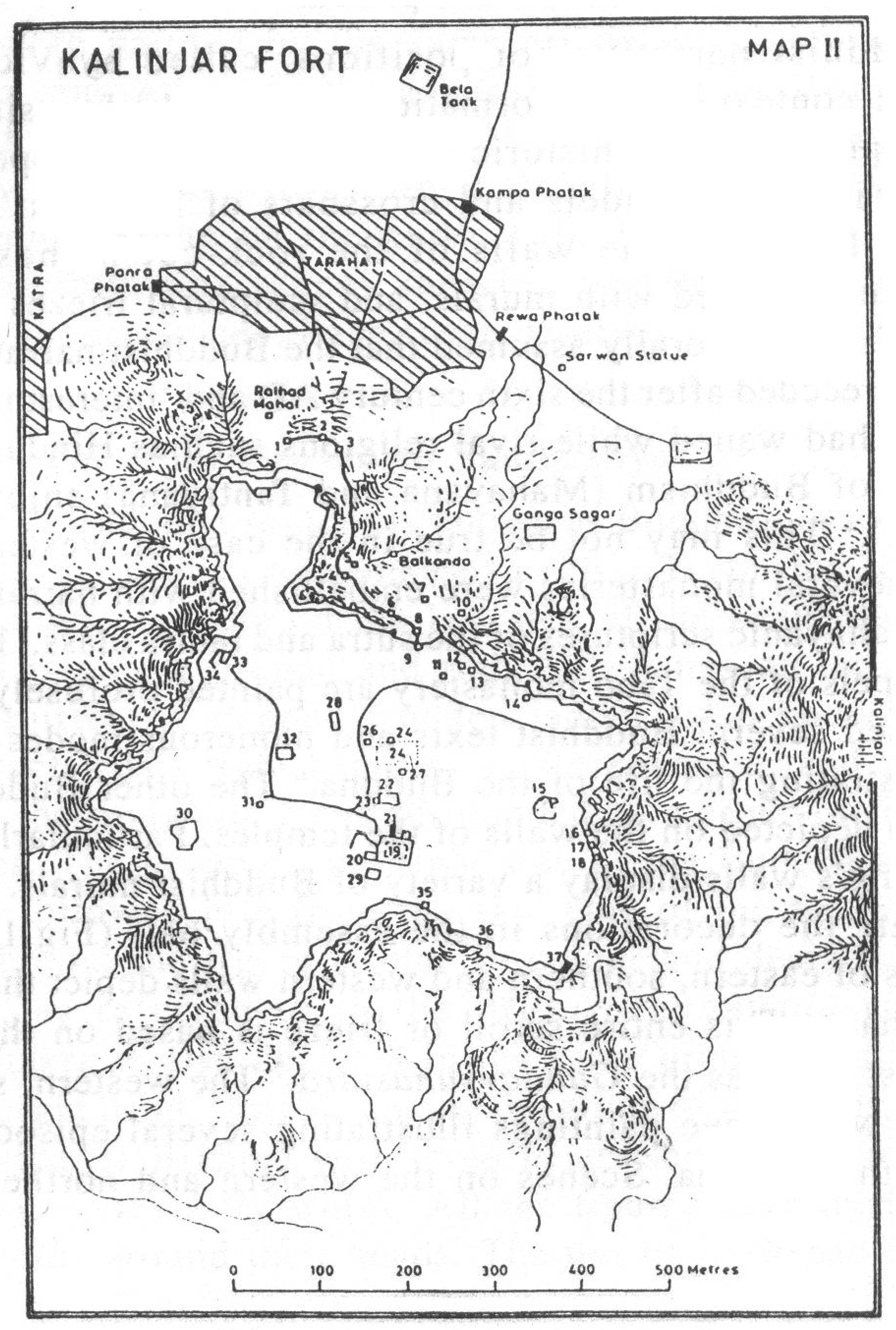
Map of Kalinjar Fort by Syed Ali Nadeem Rezavi

1. Alam /Alamgiri Darwaz
2. Ganesh Darwaza
3. Chandi/Chauburji Darwaza
4. Budhabhadra Darwaza
5. Gate leading to Balkhandi Mahadeo
6. Hanuman Darwaza
7. Hanuman Kund
8. Lal Darwaza
9. Bada Darwaza
10. Bhairon Kund
11. Sita Sej
12. Sita Kund
13. Patal Ganga
14. Pandu Kund
15. Budhbhadra talao (“Budhi Budha/Burhiya)
16. Pani ki Aman_ kund
17. Bhagwan Sej
18. Sidh ki Gupha
19. Koth Tirth
20. Raja Aman Singh Palace
21. Islam Shah mosque
22. Sanichar Talao
23. Qanati mosque I
24. Graveyard
25. Tomb
26. Tomb
27. ‘Rani Mahal’ & ‘Venkat Biihari Mandir’
28. Rang Mahal
29. Bijli Talao
30. Ram Katora talao (“Ramna”)
31. Dak Bungalow I
32. Taliyya Talao
33. Parmardi Deva Gate of Nilkantha Temple
34. Nilkantha Temple
35. Mrigdhara
36. Bhairon ka Jhirka
37. Panna Gate

== Geography ==
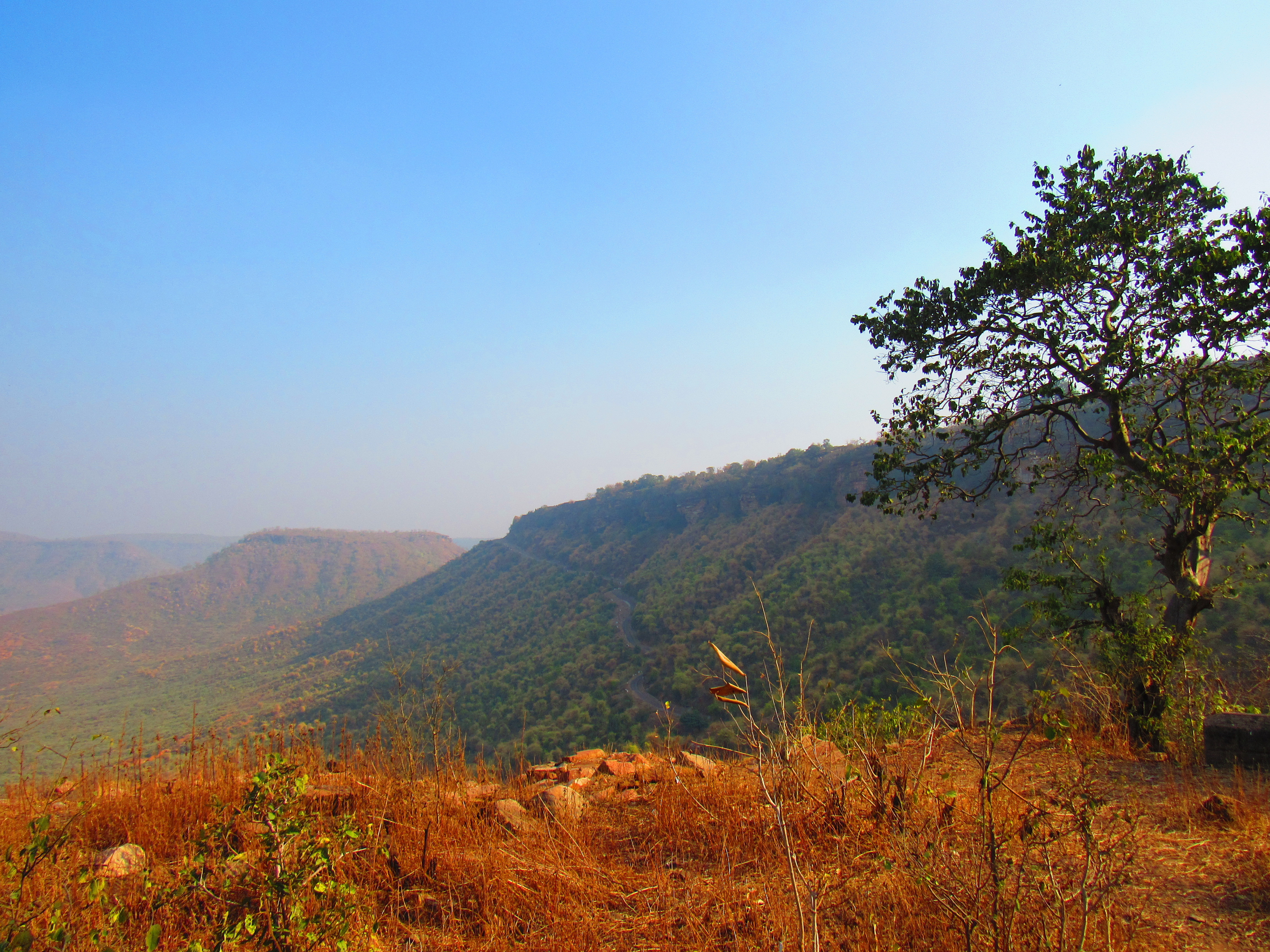
The hills at Kalinjar, which form an outlying part of the Vindhya Range

The fort of Kalinjar is located on the hill of Kalinjar, which is an isolated, flat-topped outcrop of the Vindhya Range on the border between Uttar Pradesh and Madhya Pradesh. The hill is 244 m higher than the surrounding plain, at a total of 408 m above sea level. The village of Tarahati, which is also called Kalinjar, is located at the northern foot of the hill. The fort's main entrance is on the north, accessed through the town, although there is a second entrance on the fort's southeastern side.

== Structures ==
=== Northern approach gateways ===
There are seven gates on the main approach to the fort, from the north. There would have once been several flights of stone steps leading up this approach, but most of these are no longer extant. The first flight, though, has mostly survived. It leads uphill to the first gate, the Alam Darwaza. An inscription at the top dates it to 1084 AH (1673 CE), during the reign of Aurangzeb. There is then a steep ascent, again with most of the stairs intact, to the second gate, the Ganesh Darwaza. This gate is named after a "coarse" image of the god Ganesha carved on its right side. Not far from the Ganesh Darwaza is the third gate, the Chandi Darwaza, which is a double gatehouse with four towers, hence the alternate name Chauburji Darwaza ("gate of the four towers"). There is also a structure here that was probably originally a guardhouse.

Some ways after the Chandi Darwaza, the uphill path bends sharply at almost a right angle. A path branches off here and goes downhill to the Balkhandi Mahadeo shrine; a "small, dilapidated gateway" called the Balkhandi Mahadeo Darwaza is on the way.

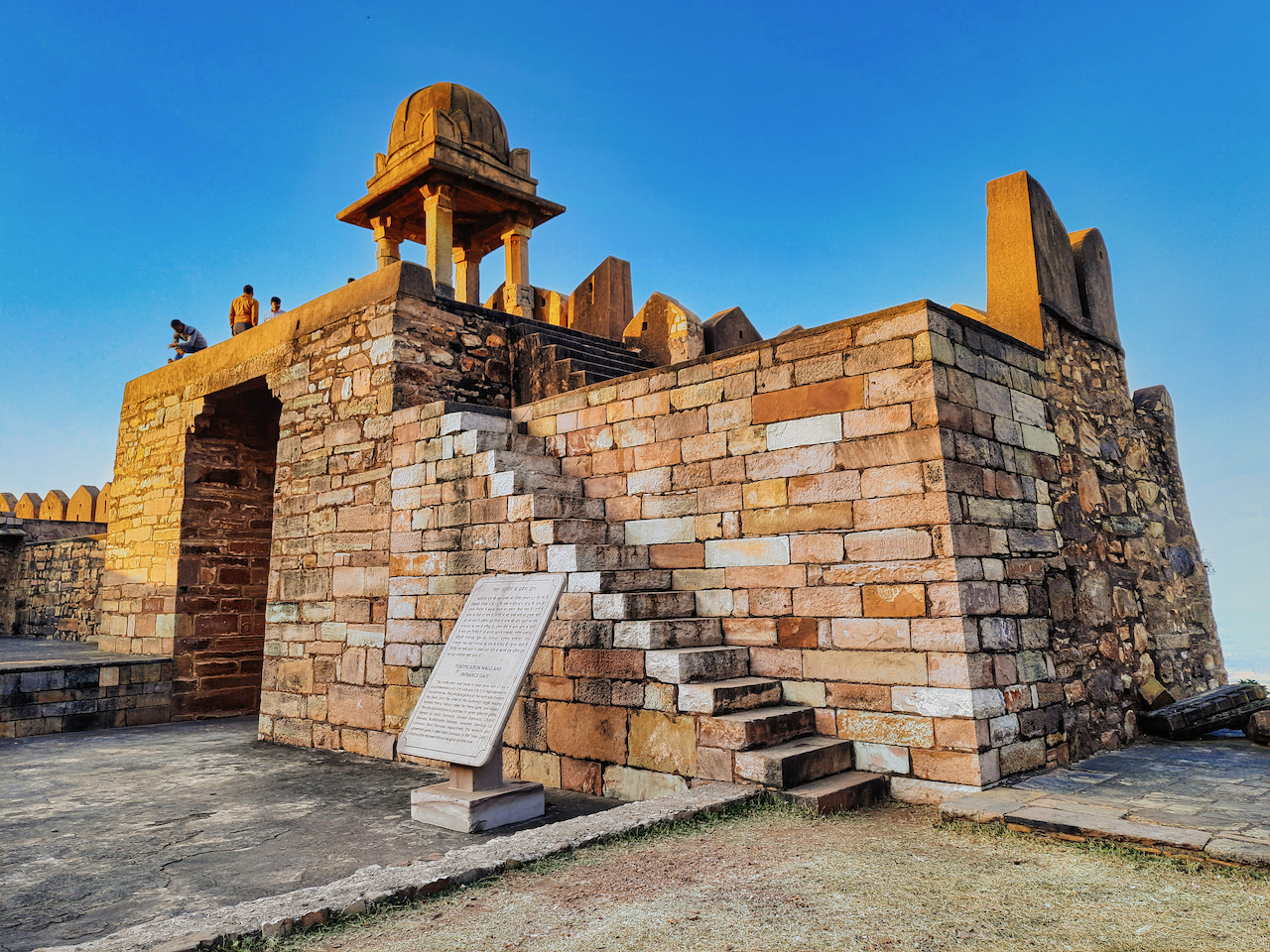
The Bara Darwaza, viewed from inside the fort. This is the seventh and innermost gate controlling access to the hilltop complex.

Back on the main path, there is the fourth gate, called the Budhabhadra Darwaza, and then the fifth gate, called the Hanuman Darwaza after a nearby carving of Hanuman. There is also a reservoir called the Hanuman Kund in this area, along with rock carvings of various deities. Continuing uphill, near the top of the ascent, is the sixth gate, called the Lal Darwaza because it is made of red sandstone. To the west of the Lal Darwaza is another reservoir called the Bhairava Kund, featuring a "colossal figure of Bhairava cut in the rock". Finally, not far from the Lal Darwaza is the Bara Darwaza, the final gate and the entrance to the fort proper.

=== Nilakantha Temple ===
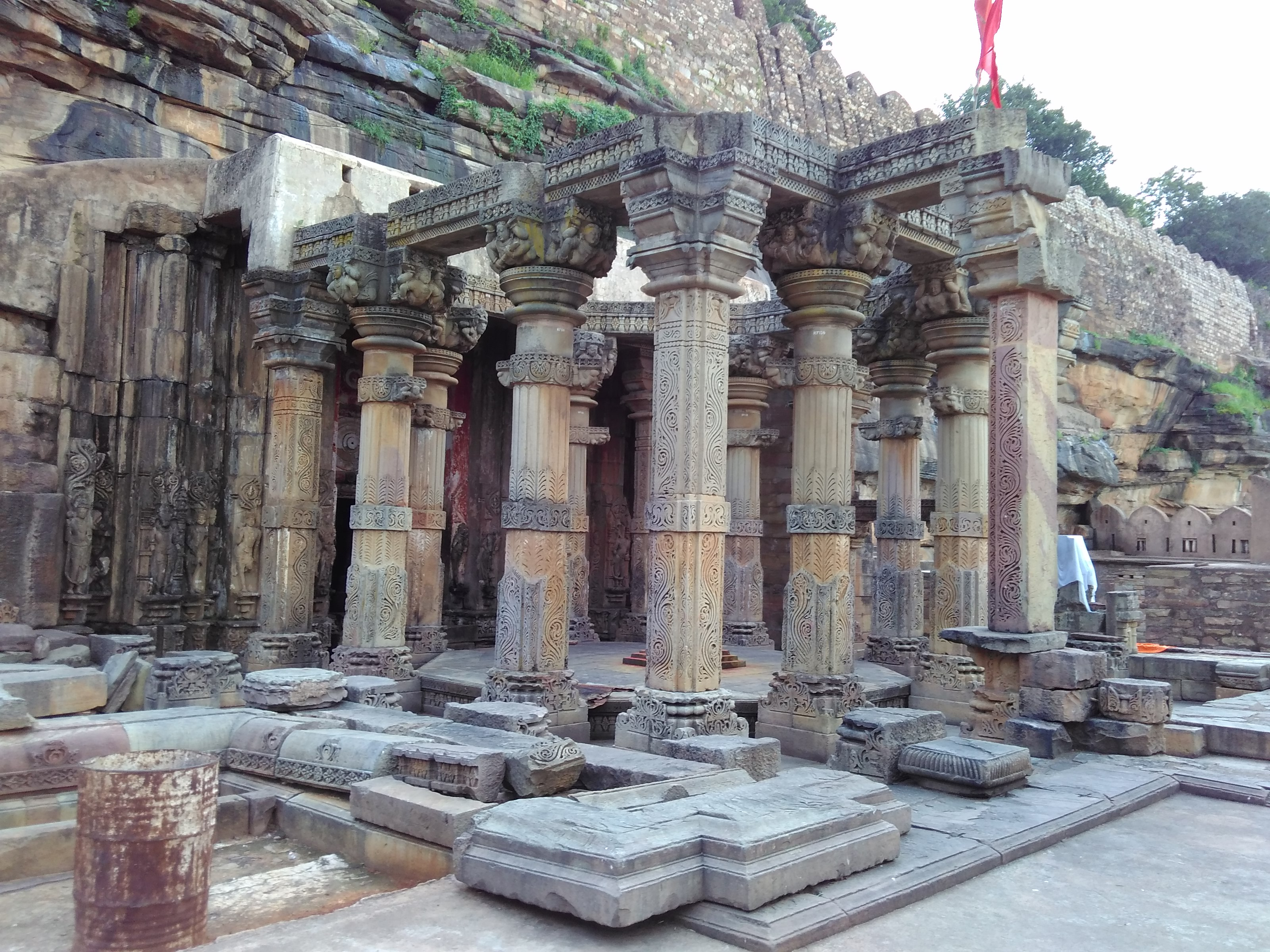
Mandapa of the Nilakantha temple, three-quarters view

The "most prominent structure in the fort" is the Nilakantha Temple, which is located in cave beneath an overhanging ledge below the ramparts, near the northwestern corner of the hill. The temple is approached through a post-and-lintel gateway known as the Paramardideva Darwaza, followed by a flight of steps leading down to the temple. At the front of the temple itself is an ornately carved but now dilapidated mandapa (pavilion) with eight pillars that would have once supported an octagonal roof. The cave's façade was also originally elaborately carved — for example, the sculptures of the river goddesses Ganga and Yamuna on either side of the cave entrance, which are still in good condition — but much of this is now heavily damaged and effaced. Inside the cave shrine is a 1.15 m-tall linga, dark blue and depicted with three eyes.

To the right (south) of the temple is a "deep rock-cut reservoir" called the Svargarohana. To the right of this, in a niche in the cliff, in a pool of water, is a colossal statue of Kala-Bhairava, a wrathful form of Shiva, that stands about 7 m tall and 5 m wide. Bhairava is depicted here with 18 arms, holding a sword, an axe, a club, a shield, a bowl of blood, and some laddu, although the trishula (trident) that is common in depictions of Shiva is absent here. Next to the statue of Bhairava is a smaller one (about 1 m tall) of Kali.

=== Bundela palaces ===
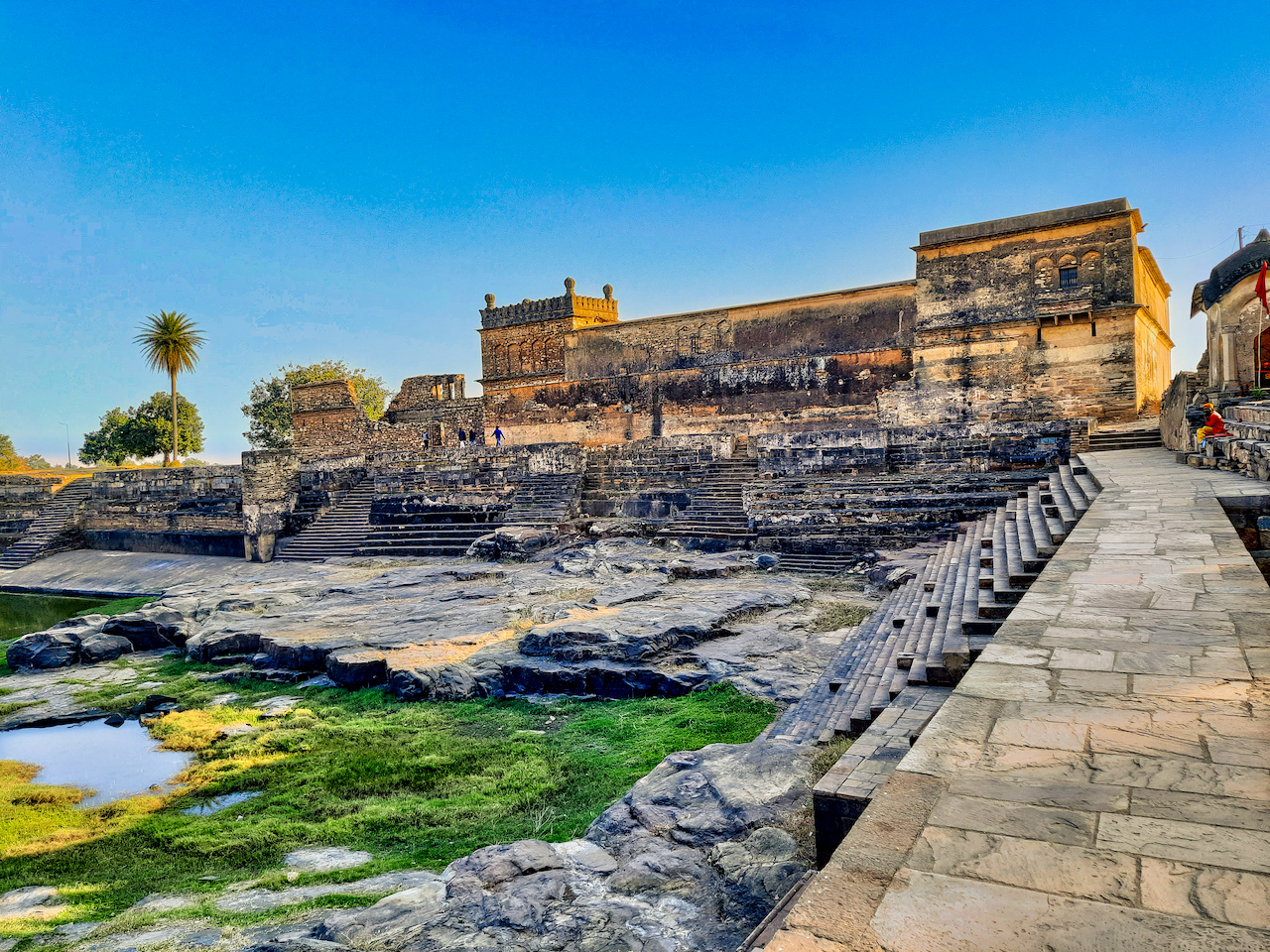
In the foreground is the Koti Tirtha tank. Behind it is the Aman Singh Palace, which now serves as a site museum.

At least three palaces dating from the Bundela period are still extant at Kalinjar: the Raja Aman Singh Palace, the Rani Mahal, and the Rang Mahal. These structures follow the same general plan: a multi-storey building surrounding a square courtyard, with each storey having a wide eave (chhajja) and overhanging balcony, and each of the buildings' four corners is crowned with a chhatri (cupola). The Aman Singh Palace, at the southern part of the fort, currently serves as a site museum housing various sculptural and other remains that have been found at Kalinjar. Adjacent to the Aman Singh Palace is a tank called the Koth Tirth, the largest body of water in the fort, formed by cutting the underlying rock to make a depression to hold water. The Koth Tirth is surrounded by steps on all sides, and numerous pilgrims' inscriptions are carved into these steps, indicating that it was historically one of the most important for religious visits.

The Rani Mahal, located a bit to the north of the Aman Singh Palace in the central part of the fort, is currently in a dilapidated state. The Rang Mahal is located to the northwest.

Any secular structures from periods other than the Bundela period do not appear to have survived.

=== Mosques, tombs, and Muslim cemetery ===
Two mosques exist in the middle of the fort. One, the Islam Shah mosque, is just to the north of the Koth Tirth and is surrounded by a walled courtyard. There do not appear to have ever been any riwaq (arcades) around the mosque itself. The mosque is accessed through a gate on its east side, with a three-bay-deep liwan to the west. It has a flat roof, supported by square pillars, and at its rear (western) wall is decorated with five blind arches. The mihrab is undecorated and is located in the middle arch at the rear wall. The second mosque is a qanati (screen) mosque located at the southwestern corner of the Sanichar Talao tank.

A Muslim cemetery is also located in the fort's central area, with numerous undated graves. Two tombs are located at the northwestern corner of the cemetery, which are both square and topped with "Lodi-style" domes. The larger tomb has a mihrab on its west with an inscription in Persian.

== Transport links ==
=== Air ===
The nearest airport is at Khajuraho, 100 km (62 mi) away but has limited connectivity. Kanpur Airport which is well connected with metropolitan cities of India is 175 km (109 mi) and 4 hours drive from Kalinjar.

=== Rail ===
The nearest railway station is at Atarra 36 km (22 mi) away, on the Banda-Satna route, 65 km (40 mi) from Banda Railway Station.

=== Road ===
The Kalinjar fort is linked by road to all the important centres in the region with regular bus services. Some of the major road distances are: Chitrakoot, 78 km (48 mi); Banda, 65 km (40 mi); Khajuraho, 130 km (81 mi); and Prayagraj, 205 km (127 mi).

== Tourism ==
According to the national Ministry of Tourism statistics based on ticket returns, Kalinjar Fort received some 128,834 visitors in 2024–25, of whom 128,447 came from India and 387 from other countries.

== Gallery ==
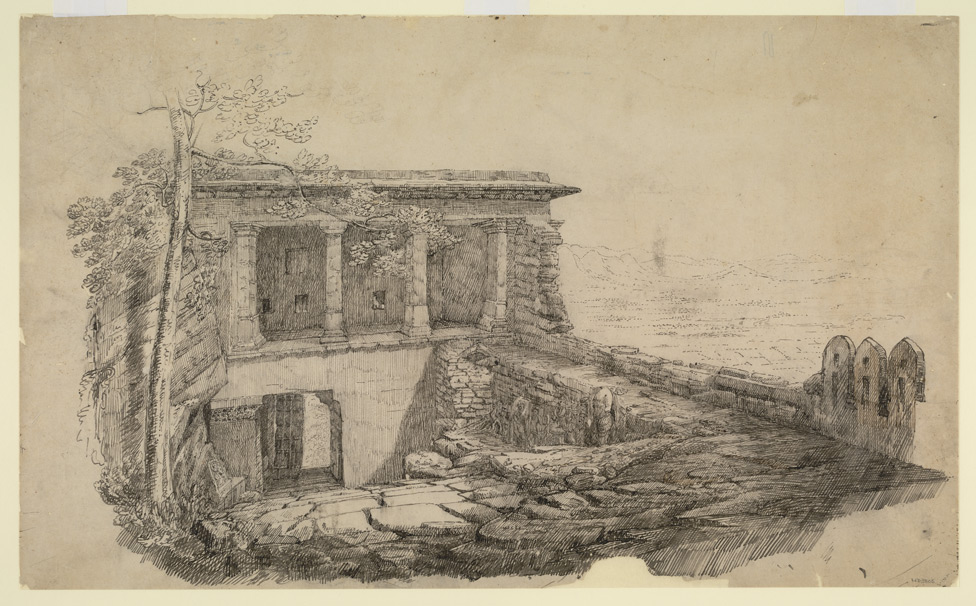
Pillared building at one corner of Kalinjar Fort

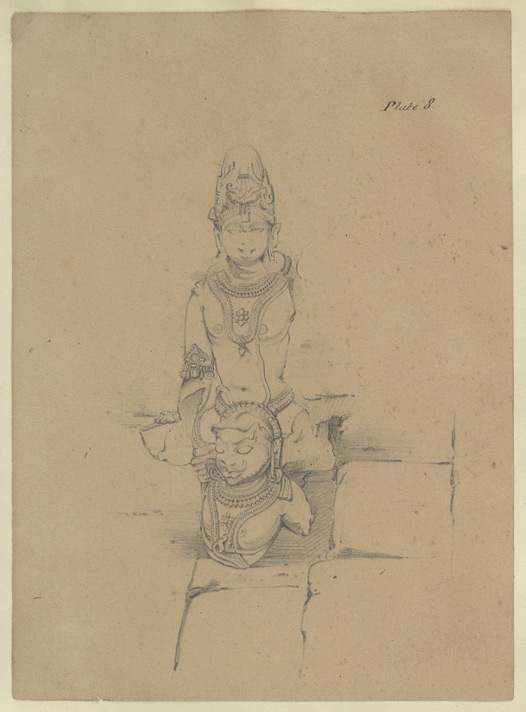
Kuvera riding on his vehicle, near temple of Nilkanth

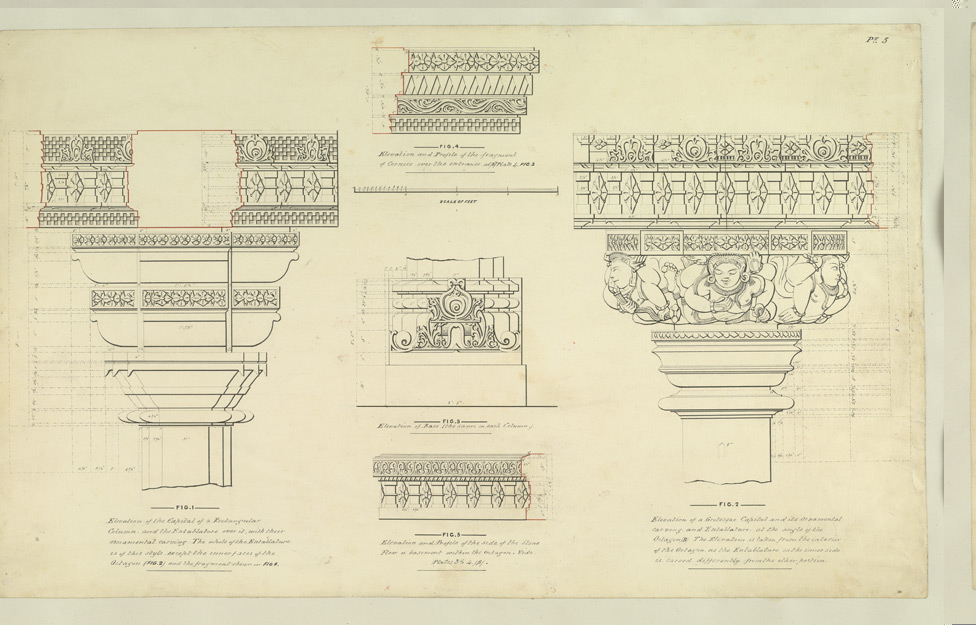
Architectural details from temple of Nilkanth

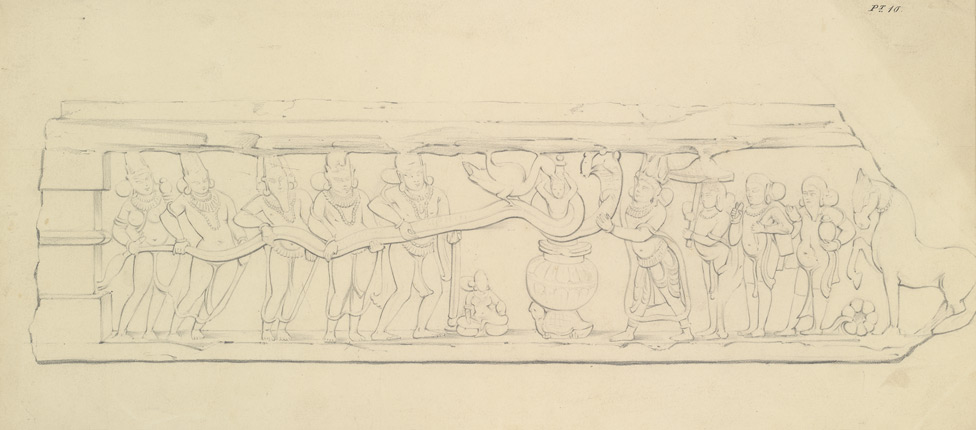
Kurma avatar

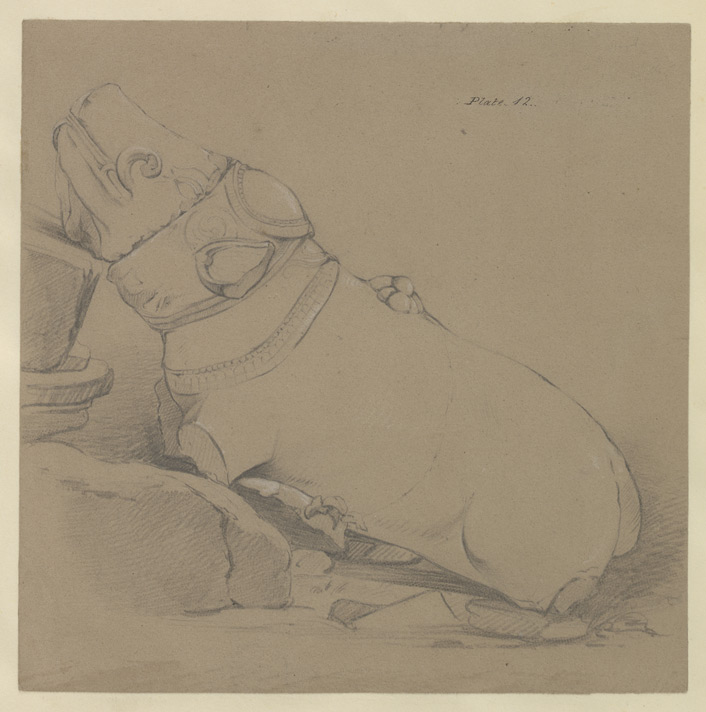
Varaha avatar

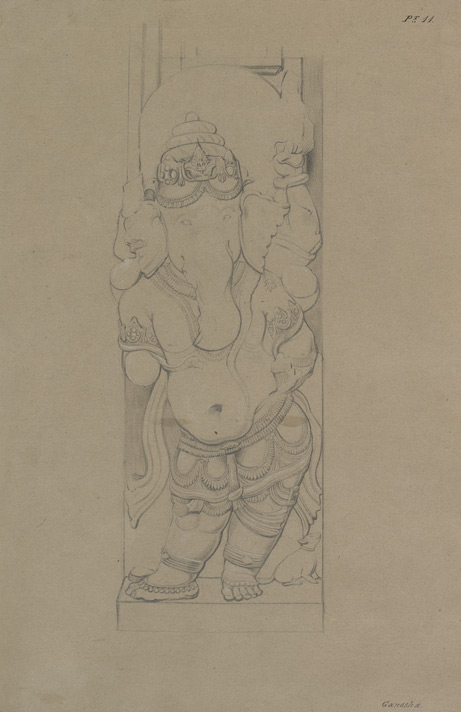
Sculpture of Ganesh from temple of Nilkanth

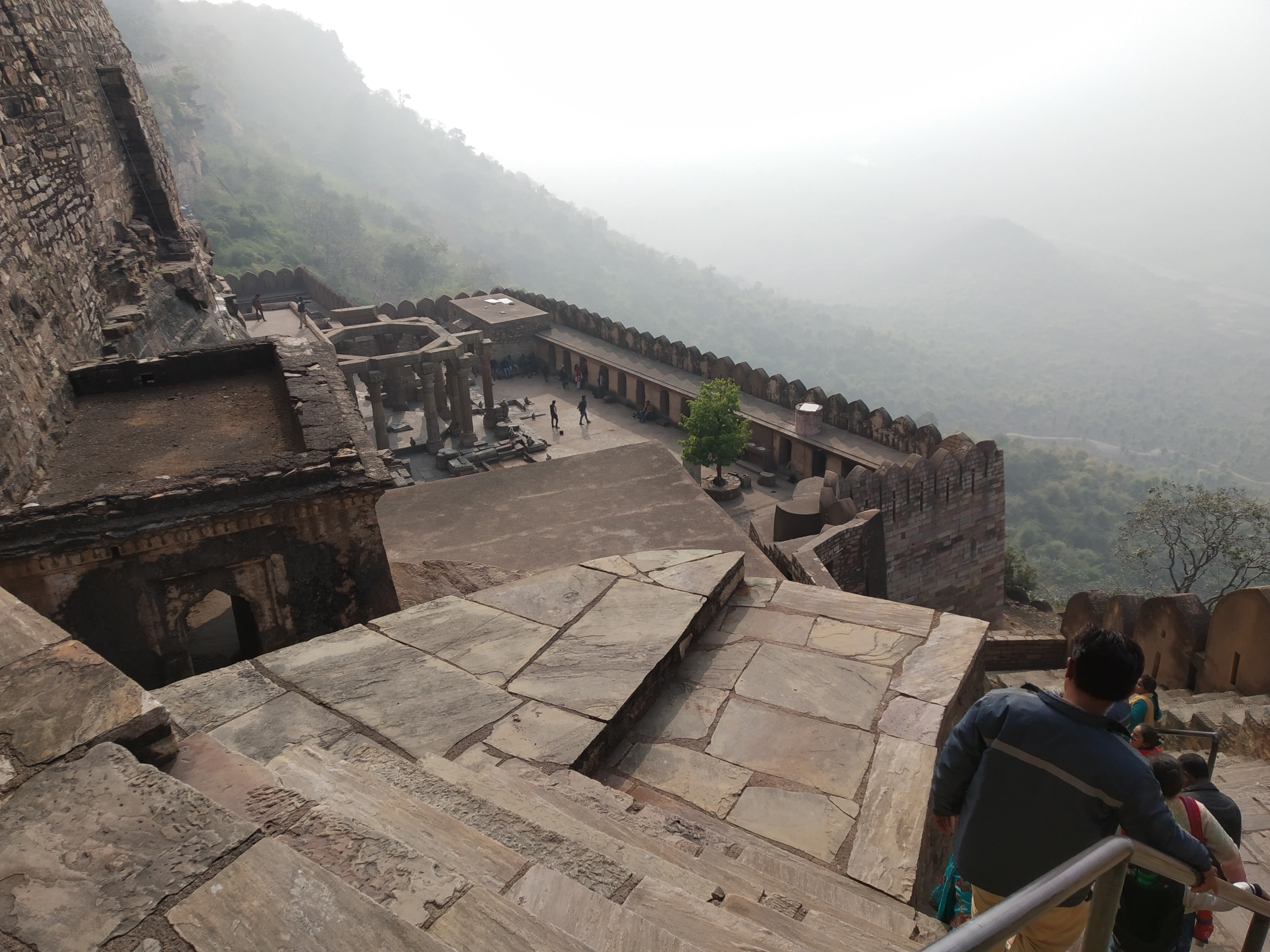
Neelkanth Mandir view from top

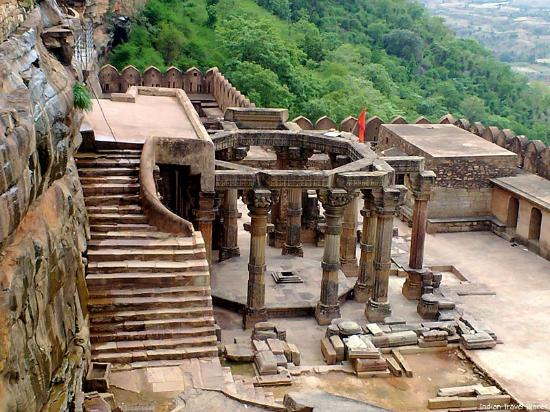
Temple in the Fort

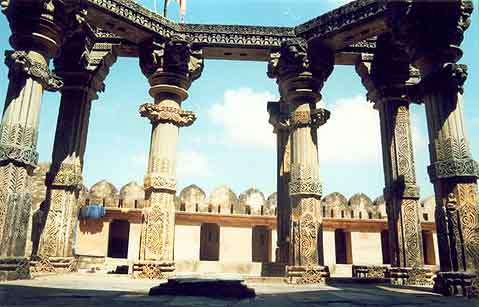
Fort (inside view)

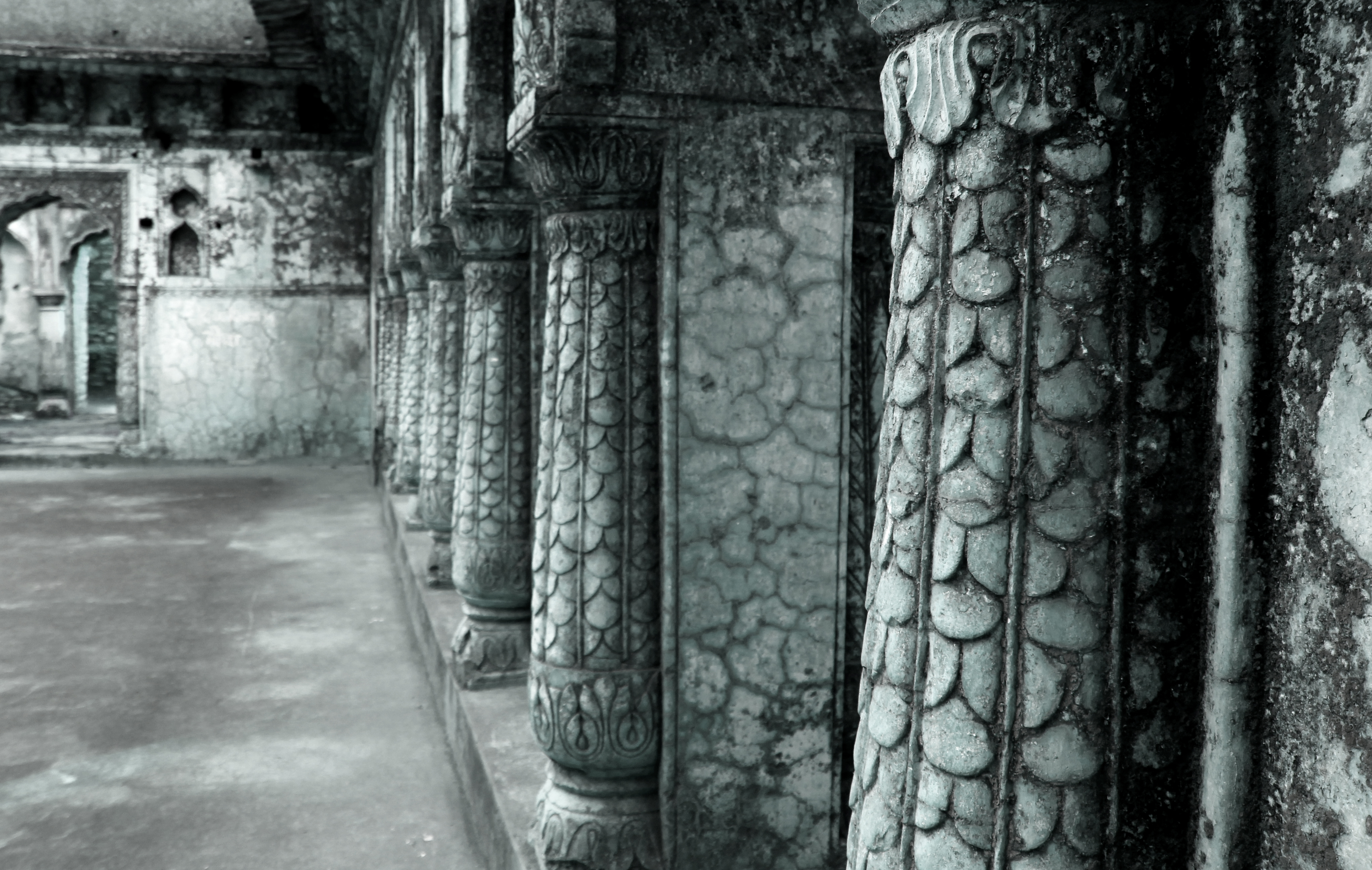
Pillar inside Rani Palace, Kalinjar Fort

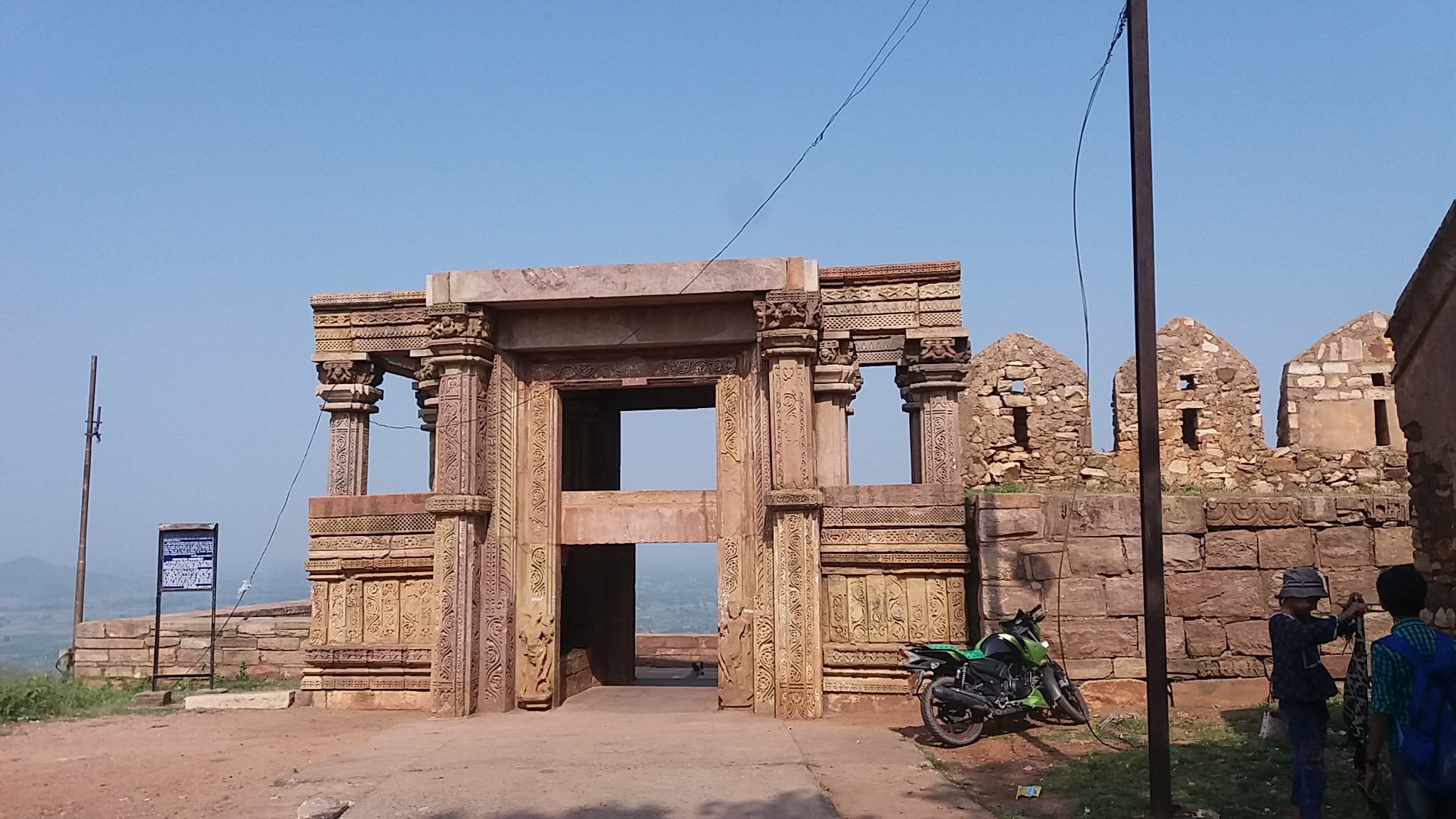
Gateway of Nilakanth temple in Kalinjar fort

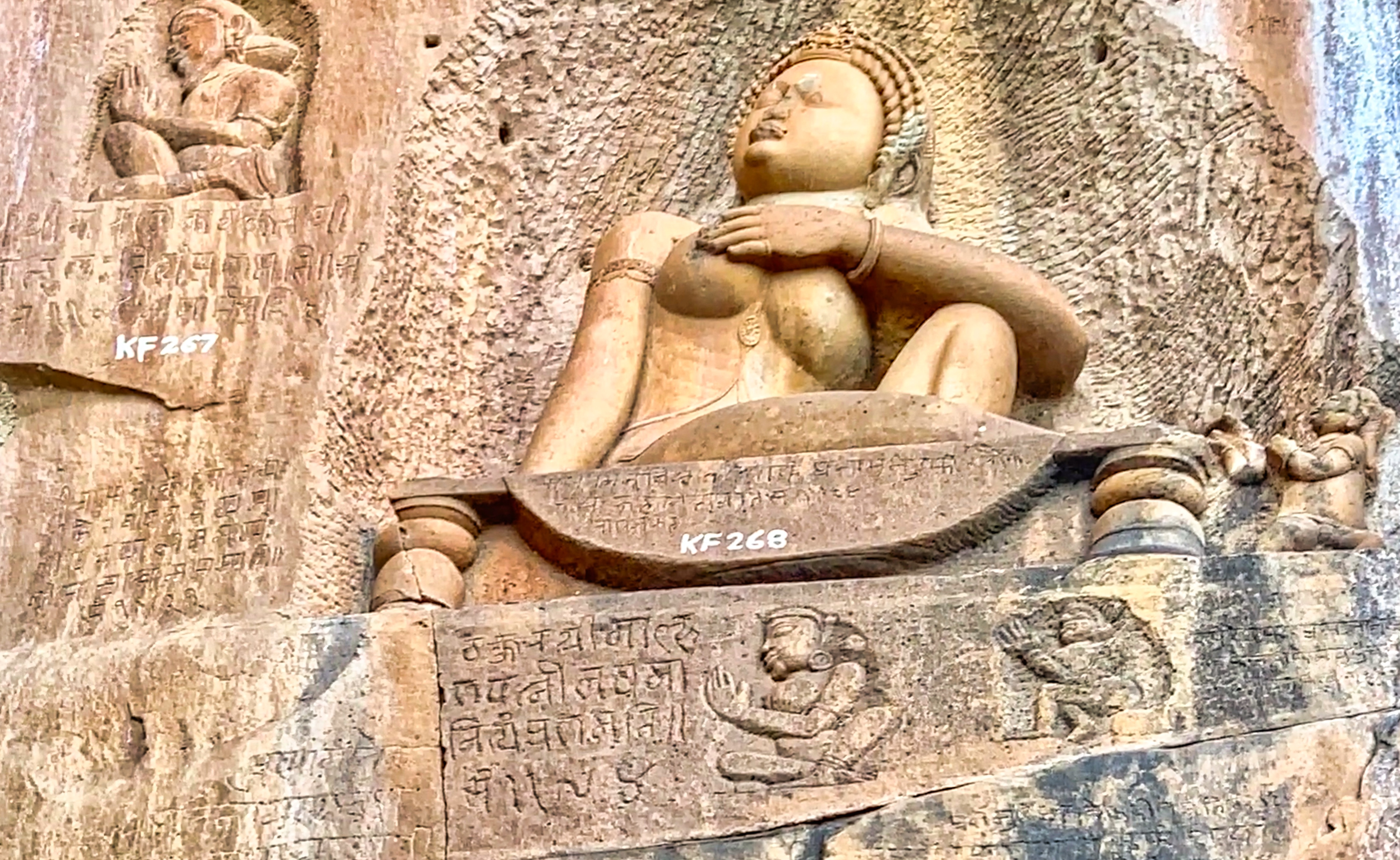
Gajasursamharamurti and Parvati bas-relief, Kalinjar Fort

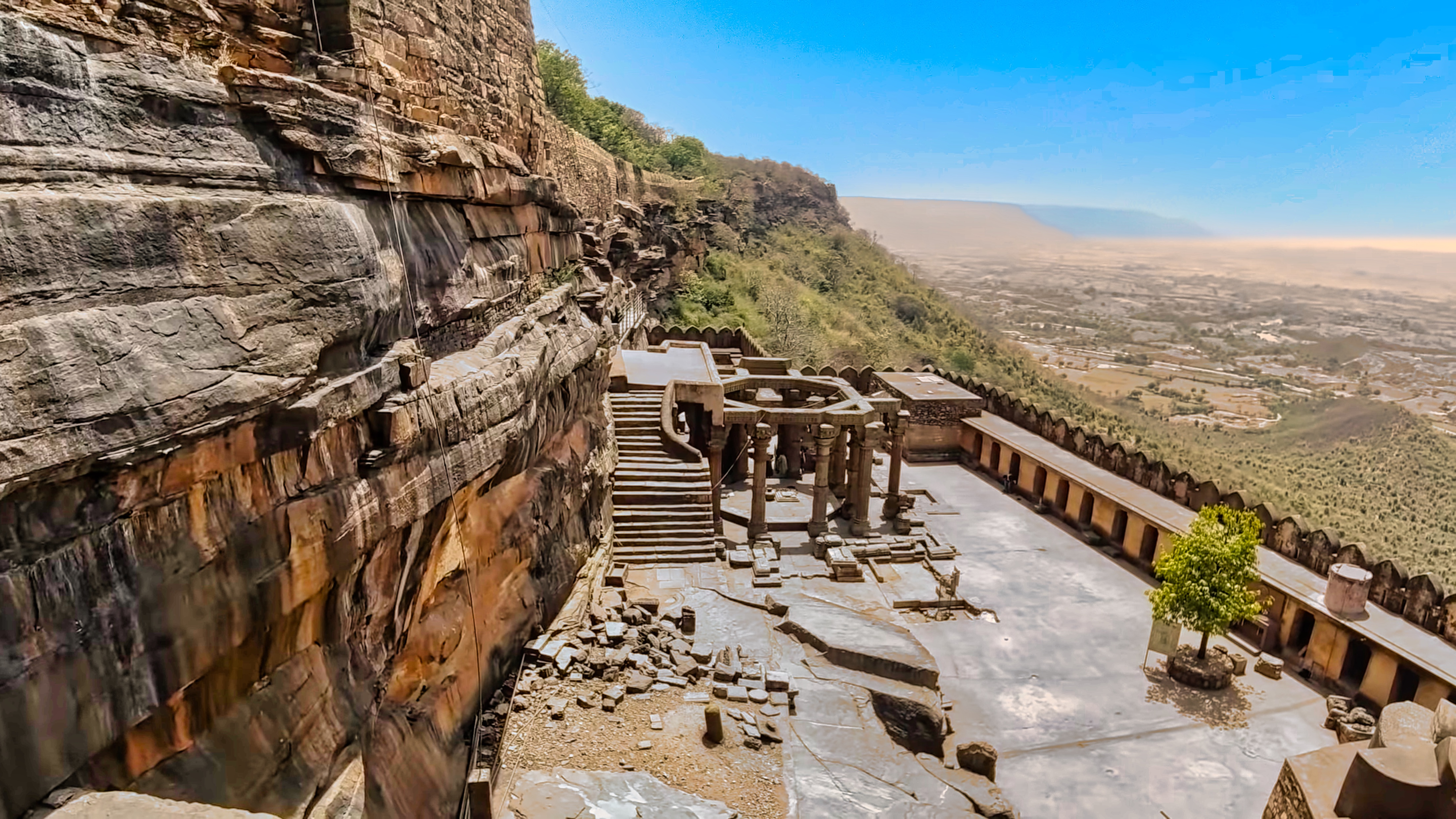
Approach to the Nilakantha temple

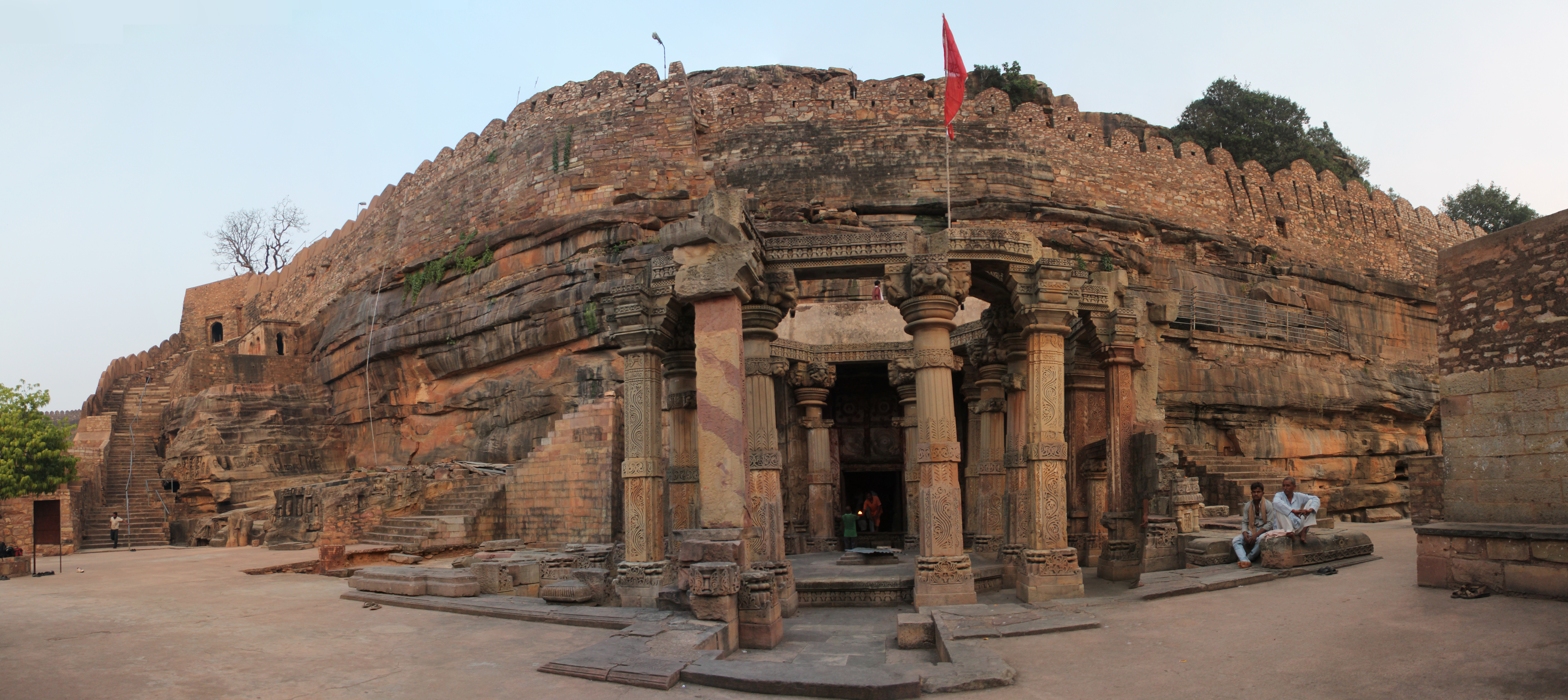
Frontal view of the Nilakantha temple

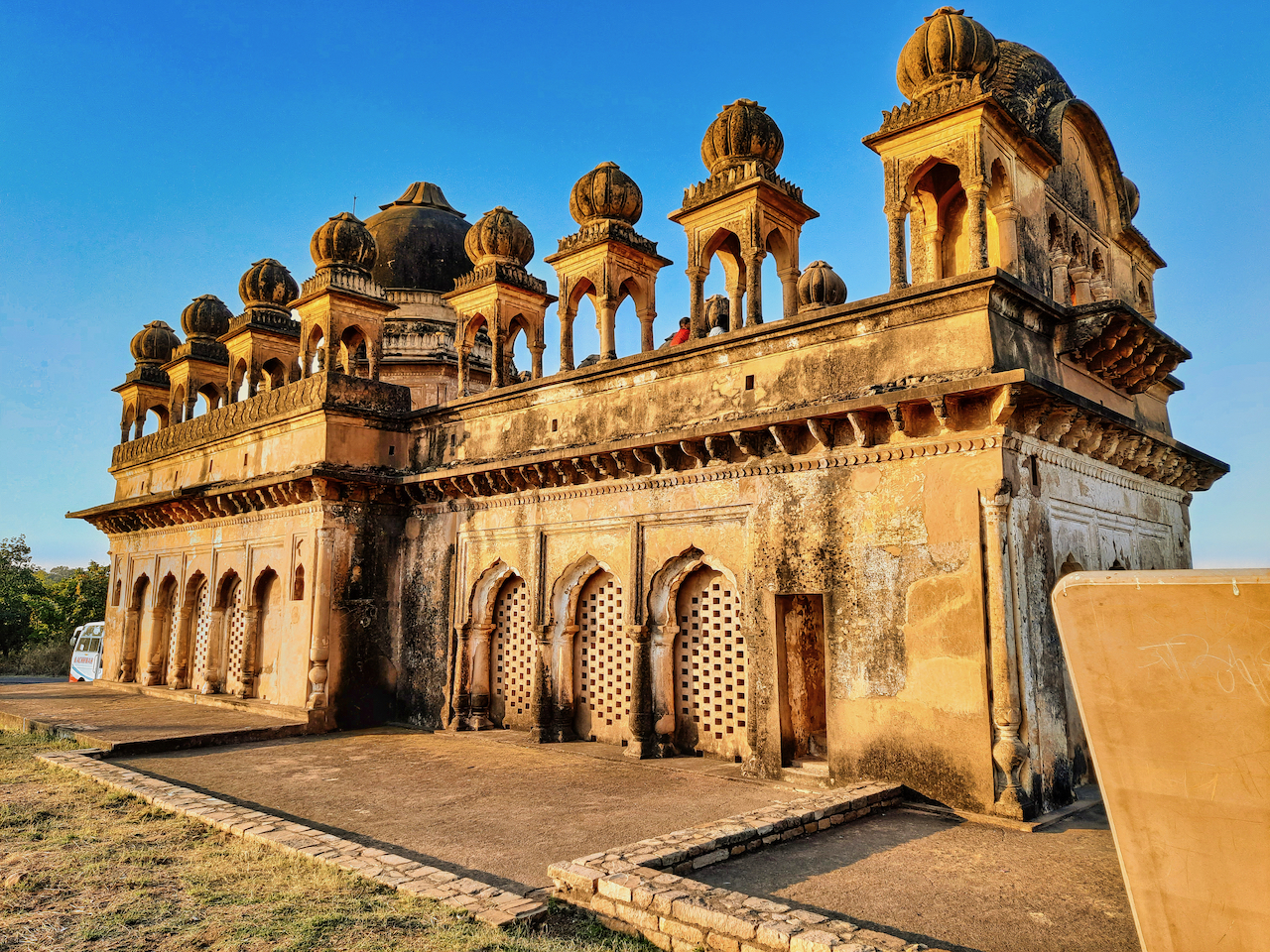
The Venkat Bihari temple, a Vishnu temple from c. the 18th century

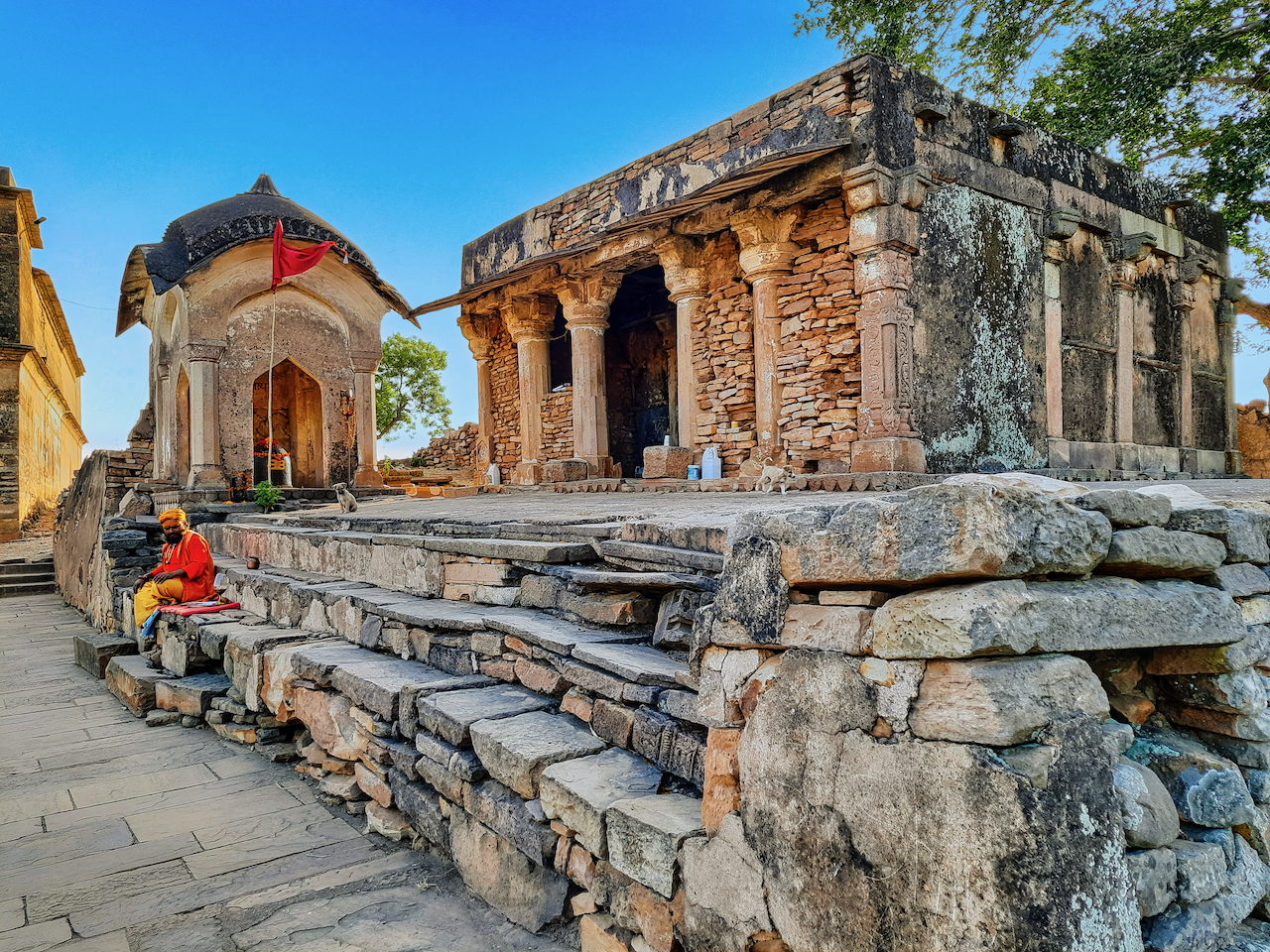
The Ram Janaki temple at Kalinjar

== See also ==
- List of forts in Uttar Pradesh
