= Bhita =

- Village
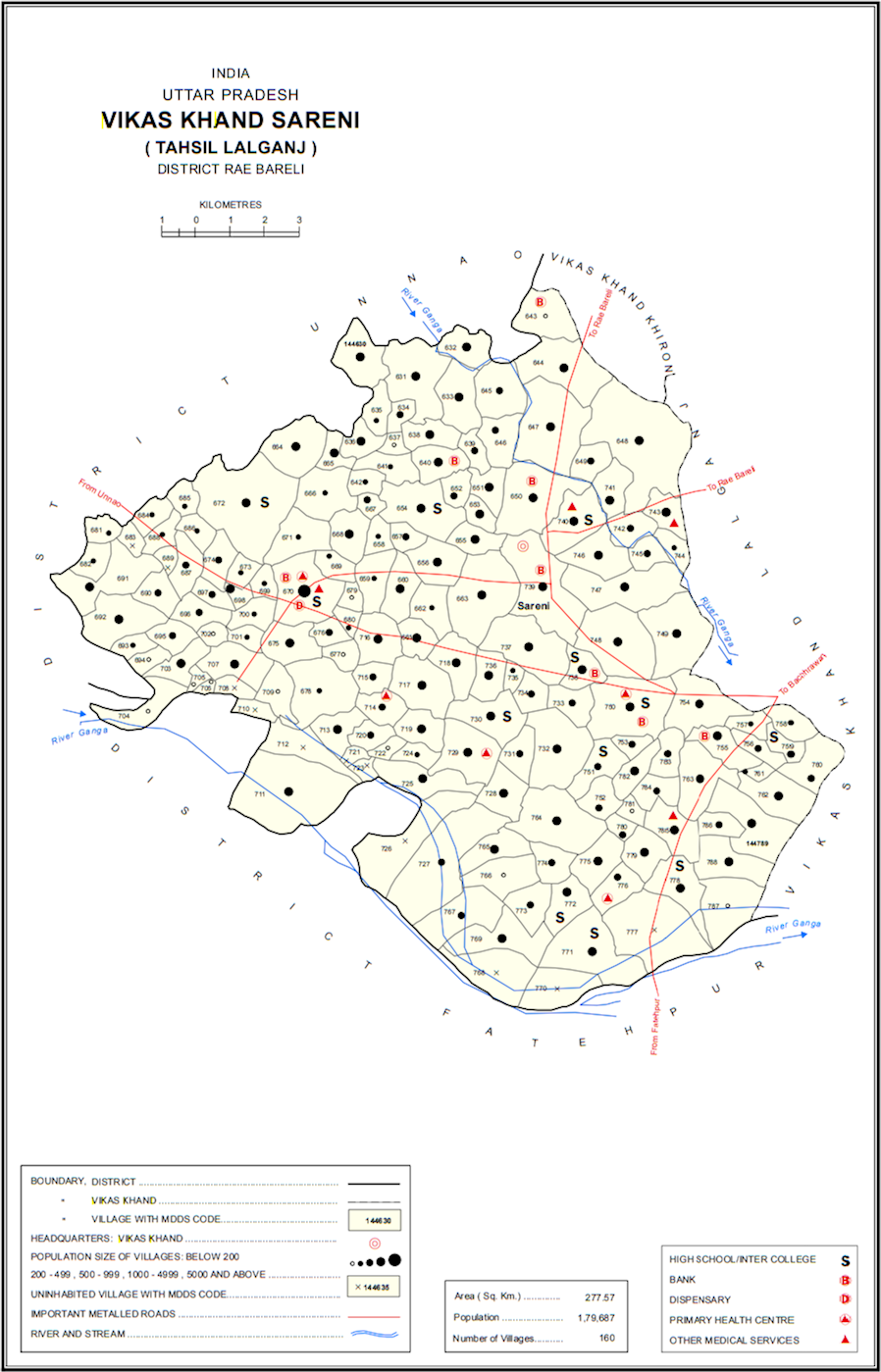
- Map showing Bhita (#780) in Sareni CD block

- Location in Uttar Pradesh, India
- Coordinates: 26.081326°N 80.848397°E
- Country: India
- State: Uttar Pradesh
- District: Raebareli

Area
  - Total: 0.378 km^{2} (0.146 sq mi)

Population (2011)
  - Total: 524
  - Density: 1,390/km^{2} (3,590/sq mi)

Languages
  - Official: Hindi
- Time zone: UTC+5:30 (IST)
- Vehicle registration: UP-35

Bhita is a village in Sareni block of Rae Bareli district, Uttar Pradesh, India. As of 2011, it has a population of 524 people, in 106 households. It has one primary school and no healthcare facilities and does not host a weekly haat or a permanent market. It belongs to the nyaya panchayat of Sagar Khera.

The 1951 census recorded Bhita as comprising 3 hamlets, with a total population of 299 people (149 male and 150 female), in 54 households and 45 physical houses. The area of the village was given as 95 acres. 46 residents were literate, 43 male and 3 female. The village was listed as belonging to the pargana of Sareni and the thana of Sareni.

The 1961 census recorded Bhita as comprising 3 hamlets, with a total population of 287 people (142 male and 145 female), in 51 households and 44 physical houses. The area of the village was given as 95 acres.

The 1981 census recorded Bhita as having a population of 383 people, in 76 households, and having an area of 38.45 hectares. The main staple foods were given as wheat and rice.

The 1991 census recorded Bhita as having a total population of 452 people (247 male and 205 female), in 80 households and 80 physical houses. The area of the village was listed as 38 hectares. Members of the 0-6 age group numbered 71, or 16% of the total; this group was 52% male (37) and 48% female (34). Members of scheduled castes made up 24% of the village's population, while no members of scheduled tribes were recorded. The literacy rate of the village was 26% (83 men and 33 women). 131 people were classified as main workers (125 men and 6 women), while 0 people were classified as marginal workers; the remaining 321 residents were non-workers. The breakdown of main workers by employment category was as follows: 63 cultivators (i.e. people who owned or leased their own land); 53 agricultural labourers (i.e. people who worked someone else's land in return for payment); 0 workers in livestock, forestry, fishing, hunting, plantations, orchards, etc.; 0 in mining and quarrying; 0 household industry workers; 1 worker employed in other manufacturing, processing, service, and repair roles; 0 construction workers; 5 employed in trade and commerce; 9 employed in transport, storage, and communications; and 0 in other services.
