= Yajvapala dynasty =

13th-century Indian dynasty

Find spots of the Yajvapala-era inscriptions

The Yajvapala (IAST: Yajvapāla) dynasty ruled parts of central India during the 13th century CE. Their capital was located at Nalapura (present-day Narwar in Shivpuri district). They are also known as Jajapella or Jajpella. The Yajvapalas carved out a kingdom in northern Madhya Pradesh during the first half of the 13th century, and successfully resisted invasions by the Chandelas and the Delhi Sultanate over the next few decades. It is not certain how their rule ended, but they probably fell to the Delhi Sultanate by the end of the century.

== History ==
A 1339 VS (c. 1282 CE) Yajvapala inscription, issued during the reign of Gopala, names the dynasty's progenitor as Jayapala (called Jajapella in vernacular language). It names the dynasty's place of origin as Ratnagiri (unidentified), and attributes the rise of Jayapala to the blessings of the goddess Maharunda (probably a family deity).

The next known member of the family is Ya[pa]ramadi-raja, whose son Chahadadeva conquered the Narwar area. Chahadadeva is mentioned as Chahar-i-Ajari in the writings of the Delhi Sultanate writer Minhaj al-Siraj Juzjani. The Delhi Sultan Iltutmish had appointed Nusrat al-Din Taisi (Tayasi) as the governor of Gwalior region. In 1235 CE, Nusrat al-Din led an expedition against the neighbouring Chandela kingdom. While he was returning to Gwalior, Chahadadeva ambushed his army. According to Minhaj-i-Siraj, Taisi's army managed to defend itself with considerable difficulty. In 1251, the Sultanate general Balban defeated Chahadadeva during the reign of Sultan Nasiruddin Mahmud, but he could not capture Narwar.

Chahadadeva was succeeded by Asalladeva. The next ruler Gopaladeva faced an invasion from the Chandela king Viravarman in 1281–82 CE (1338 VS). The Bangla and Narwar inscriptions of the Yajvapalas claim that Gopala defeated Viravarman. According to the Bangla inscription, a battle was fought on the banks of the Valuva river (near modern Baruwa near Narwar) on 28 March 1281 CE (assuming Karttikadi year). The Narwar inscription states that Gopala defeated Viravarman and king Lakshmana of Chandragiri on the banks of the Sikata river. However, the Dahi copper-plate inscription of the Chandelas claims that the Chandela general Mallaya defeated the lord of Nalapura (that is, Gopala). It is possible that the Chandelas achieved some initial successes, but ultimately, they were forced to retreat.

The last known ruler of the dynasty is Ganapatideva. It is known that the Yajvapalas ruled Narwar until 1298 CE, but the end of the dynasty is not certain. Historians generally assume that the Yajvapalas fell to an invasion by the Delhi Sultan Alauddin Khalji.

== Rulers ==
Following rulers of the dynasty are attested by inscriptions and coins:

1. Chahada-deva
  - His inscriptions have been found at Udaipur, Kadwaha, Bhaktar
  - Issued coins datable to 1237–1254 CE These coins are dated in Vikrama Samvat. They feature a horseman on one side, and the legend Srimat Chahadadeva on the other side.
2. Asalla-deva
  - His inscriptions have been found at Narwar, Barodi, Bhimpur, Budirai
  - Issued coins datable to 1254–1279 CE These coins also feature a horseman.
3. Gopala-deva
  - His inscriptions have been found at Narwar (3), Bangla (13), Balarpur, Barodi, Sesai and Surwaya
  - His coins have been found in a hoard of 791 coins of the dynasty (found at Gwalior)
4. Ganapati-deva
  - His inscriptions have been found at Tilori, Narwar, Paharo, Balarpur (2), Bhensarwas, Surwaya (2), Budhera and Gwalior
