= Trailokyavarman =

King of Jejakabhukti from 1203 to 1245

- Parama-bhattaraka Maharajadhiraja Parameshvara, Kalanjaradhipati

King of Jejakabhukti
- Reign: 1203–1245
- Predecessor: Paramardi-deva
- Successor: Viravarman
- Died: 1245
- Dynasty: Chandela

Trailokyavarman (reigned c. 1203–1245) was a king of the Chandela dynasty of central India. He ruled the Jejakabhukti region (Bundelkhand in present-day Madhya Pradesh and Uttar Pradesh). Epigraphic evidence suggests that he recaptured Kalanjara from the Delhi Sultanate.

== Early life ==
Chandela inscriptions suggest that Trailokyavarman succeeded Paramardi as the Chandela ruler. He was probably Paramardi's son, although this cannot be said with certainty based on the available evidence.

== Reign ==
Seven inscriptions of Trailokyavarman have been found at Ajaygarh, Banpur, Garra near Chhatarpur, and Tehri (Tikamgarh). A number of other places in the Bundelkhand region are mentioned in these inscriptions. The inscriptions give him the usual imperial titles Parama-bhattaraka Maharajadhiraja Parameshvara Parama-Maheshvara Shri-Kalanjaradhipati. His coins have been found in Banda district. This indicates that he controlled a large part of the traditional Chandela dominions.

Trailokyavarman bore the title Kalanjaradhipati ("Lord of Kalanjara"), which suggests that he recovered the Kalanjara fort from the Turkic rulers of the Delhi Sultanate. The Garra copper-plate inscription of Trailokyavarman as well as the Ajaygarh inscription of his successor Viravarman support this hypothesis. The Garra inscription records the grant of a village to the son of Rauta Pape, who was killed in a battle with the Turushkas (Turkic people) at Kakadadaha. The Ajaygarh inscription states that like Vishnu, he lifted the earth submerged in the ocean formed by the Turushkas.

The Muslim chronicle Tabaqat-i Nasiri also suggests that Kalanjara had slipped from the Delhi Sultanate control, before it was raided by Iltutmish's officer Malik Nusrat-ud-din Taisi (or Tayasi) in 1233 CE. According to the text, Taisi marched to Kalanjara from Gwalior, forcing the ruler of Kalanjara to flee, and then plundered the city.

According to the Ajaygarh rock inscription from Bhojavarman's reign, Trailokyavarman's general Ananda subjugated several tribes, including the Bhillas, the Shabaras and the Pulindas. He is also said to have defeated Bhojuka, whose identity is uncertain.

Some earlier scholars believed that Trailokyavarman captured the northern portion of the Kalachuri kingdom as well as Kanyakubja. This theory was based on the identification of "Trailokyamalla" mentioned in the 1212 CE Dhureti inscription with Trailokyavarman. However, the discovery of the 1197 CE Jhulpur inscription nullifies this assumption: Trailokyamalla was actually a son of Kalachuri king Vijayasimha.

Like his predecessors, Trailokyavarman issued gold coins featuring a seated goddess, and copper coins featuring the deity Hanuman. He was succeeded by Viravarman.
