= Hammiravarman =

- Kalanjaradhipati (Lord of Kalanjara)

King of Jejakabhukti
- Reign: (c. 1288-1311 CE)
- Predecessor: Bhojavarman
- Successor: Viravarman II
- Dynasty: Chandela

Hammira-Varman (IAST: Hammīravarman, c. 1288-1311 CE) was a king of the Chandela dynasty of central India. He ruled in the Jejakabhukti region (Bundelkhand in present-day Madhya Pradesh and Uttar Pradesh). During his reign, the Delhi Sultan Alauddin Khalji conquered some parts of the Chandela kingdom.

== Early life ==
The name Hammiravarman (IAST: Hammīravarman) derives from the words "Hammira", a Sanskritized form of the Muslim title Amir, and "Varman", a traditional Indian title. "Hammira" became popular among the Rajput dynasties amid Turkic (Khalji) influence.

Hammiravarman succeeded Bhojavarman as the Chandela king. However, the name of Bhojavarman has been omitted in the list of predecessors given in his 1308 Charkhari copper plate inscription. The inscription mentions Bhojavarman's predecessors Paramardideva, Trailokyavarman and Viravarman. This indicates that Bhojavarman was not an ancestor of Hammiravarman. Rai Bahadur Hiralal theorized that the two kings were brothers, but this assumption has not been corroborated by any other evidence. According to Eliky Zannas, the two kings were probably cousins, Hammiravarman being the son of Viravarman.

Hiralal also suggested that Hamirpur, Uttar Pradesh derives its name from Hammiravarman. However, according to the Hamirpur District Gazetteer, the city is named after Hamira Deva, a Kalachuri ruler.

== Reign ==
Places where inscriptions of Hammiravarman have been discovered (map of Madhya Pradesh)

The earliest and the latest known inscriptions of Hamiravarman are dated to 1289 CE and 1311 CE. This indicates that his reign lasted at least 22 years. Alauddin Khalji, the Sultan of Delhi, had taken control of large parts of north India by this time. The Charkhari copper plate uses the title "Maharajadhiraja" (King of kings) for his ancestors, but not for him. This suggests that the status of the Chandela king had lowered by his time.

A Parihar chief named Vaghadeva, who ruled the Damoh-Jabalpur area, appears to have been a vassal of Hammiravarman. A 1304 CE sati stone inscription from Salaiya village states that it was issued during the reign of Maharajaputra ("King's son") Vaghadeva. A 1308 CE Sati record from Bamni village (in Damoh district) also mentions Vaghadeva as the contemporary ruler. In addition, it describes his suzerain Hammiravarman as Kalanjaradhipati ("Lord of Kalanjara"). However, a 1309 CE sati stone from the Salaiya village names "Alayadina Sultana" (Sultan Alauddin Khalji) as the contemporary ruler. This indicates that by 1309, the Delhi Sultanate had captured this area.

Muslim sources indicate that the Delhi forces were marching towards Deccan by the late 1300s. This suggests that they might have captured the Damoh-Jabalpur area that fell on the way to Deccan. However, a 1311 CE sati stone found at Ajaygadh suggests that Ajaygadh (and possibly Kalanjara) remained under Chandela rule. There is no record of these having been captured by the Delhi Sultanate during Alauddin Khalji's reign.

Hammiravarman's successors might have retained control of the Ajaygadh and Kalanjara forts. However, the Chandela power would have declined because of the rising Muslim influence, as well as the rise of other local dynasties, such as the Bundelas, the Baghelas and the Khangars. The 1315 Ladvari (Larwari) inscription suggests that Hammiravarman was succeeded by an obscure king Viravarman II, whose titles do not indicate a high political status. One minor branch of the family continued ruling Kalanjara: its ruler was killed by Sher Shah Suri's army in 1545 CE. Another minor branch ruled at Mahoba: one of its princesses married into the Gond royal family of Mandla. Some other families also claimed Chandela descent (see Chandel).

== Inscriptions ==
We know of three inscriptions, which mention Hammiravarman as the reigning monarch:

- Charkhari copper plate (1346 VS, 11 September 1289 CE)
- Bamni (Bamhni) sati record (1365 VS, 1308 CE)
- Ajaygadh sati stone inscription (1368 VS, 1311 CE)
