= Viravarman =

Emperor of the Chandela Empire

- Parama-bhattaraka Maharajadhiraja Parameshvara, Kalanjaradhipati

King of Jejakabhukti
- Reign: c. 1245-1285 CE
- Predecessor: Trailokyavarman
- Successor: Bhojavarman
- Dynasty: Chandela
- Father: Yashovarman II

Vira-Varman (IAST: Vīravarman, reigned c. 1245-1285 CE) was a king of the Chandela dynasty of central India. He ruled the Jejakabhukti region (Bundelkhand in present-day Madhya Pradesh and Uttar Pradesh).

Viravarman succeeded Trailokyavarman as the Chandela king. He bore the usual Chandela imperial titles Parama-bhattaraka Maharajadhiraja Parameshvara Kalanjaradhipati. Like his predecessors, Viravarman issued copper coins and gold coins featuring a seated goddess.

According to the 1311 VS Charkhari inscription, Viravarman's general Rauta Abhi defeated Dabhyuhada-Varman of Chandreshvar-anvaya at Sondhi (modern Seondha). Viravarman also invaded Nalapura (modern Narwar), the capital of the Yajvapala ruler Gopala. The Dahi copper-plate inscription of the Chandelas claims that the Chandela general Mallaya defeated the lord of Nalapura. On the other hand, the Bangla and Narwar inscriptions of the Yajvapalas claim that Gopala defeated Viravarman. It is possible that Viravarman achieved some initial successes, but was forced to retreat.

According to the Muslim historians such as Firishta, the Delhi Sultan Nasiruddin Mahmud subjugated the Bundelkhand area around 1251 CE. However, he could not eliminate the Chandelas, as evident by the Chandela inscriptions dated after this period. A 1260 CE inscription of Viravarman's queen Kalyanadevi records the construction of a well and a tank at Nandipura.

According to a Kalanjara inscription, Viravarman commissioned several temples, gardens and water bodies. He also installed images of the deities such as Shiva, Kamala and Kali. An Ajaygarh inscription records the installation of a Jain image during his reign.

Viravarman was succeeded by Bhojavarman.
