= Sagar Khera =

Sagar Khera Sāgar Khera
- Village
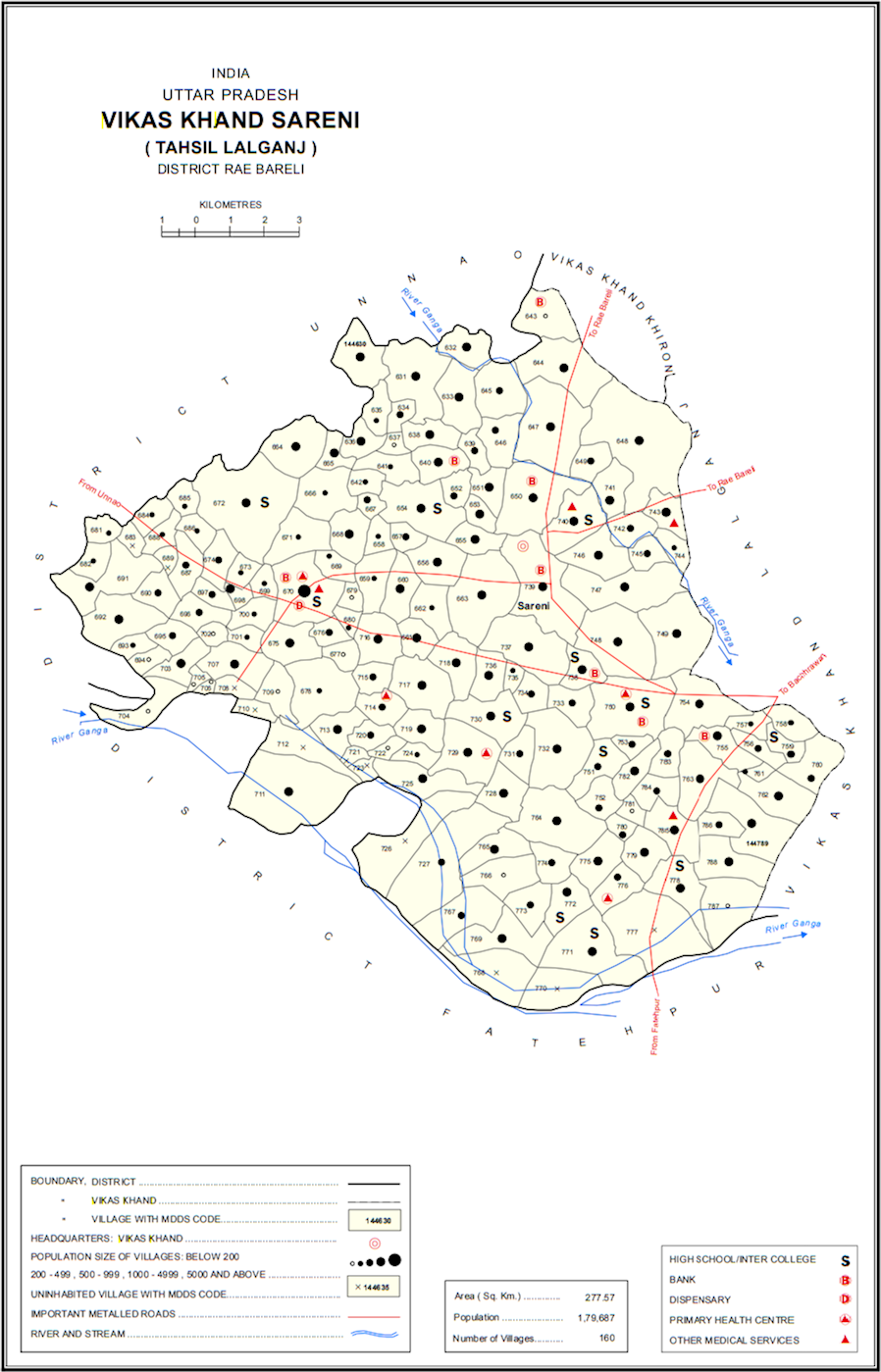
- Map showing Sagar Khera (#785) in Sareni CD block

- Location in Uttar Pradesh, India
- Coordinates: 26.086974°N 80.856018°E
- Country: India
- State: Uttar Pradesh
- District: Raebareli

Area
  - Total: 2.016 km^{2} (0.778 sq mi)

Population (2011)
  - Total: 2,102
  - Density: 1,043/km^{2} (2,700/sq mi)

Languages
  - Official: Hindi
- Time zone: UTC+5:30 (IST)
- Vehicle registration: UP-35

Sagar Khera is a village in Sareni block of Rae Bareli district, Uttar Pradesh, India. It is located 14 km from Lalganj, the tehsil headquarters. As of 2011, it has a population of 2,102 people, in 413 households. It has one primary school and a maternity and child welfare centre, and it hosts a weekly haat but not a permanent market. It is the headquarters of a nyaya panchayat, which also includes 12 other villages.

The 1951 census recorded Sagar Khera as comprising 5 hamlets, with a total population of 787 people (382 male and 405 female), in 163 households and 139 physical houses. The area of the village was given as 434 acres. 60 residents were literate, 54 male and 6 female. The village was listed as belonging to the pargana of Sareni and the thana of Sareni.

The 1961 census recorded Sagar Khera as comprising 4 hamlets, with a total population of 935 people (447 male and 488 female), in 184 households and 166 physical houses. The area of the village was given as 434 acres.

The 1981 census recorded Sagar Khera as having a population of 1,310 people, in 228 households, and having an area of 171.59 hectares. The main staple foods were given as wheat and rice.

The 1991 census recorded Sagar Khera as having a total population of 1,399 people (709 male and 690 female), in 354 households and 352 physical houses. The area of the village was listed as 172 hectares. Members of the 0-6 age group numbered 216, or 15% of the total; this group was 51% male (111) and 49% female (105). Members of scheduled castes made up 30% of the village's population, while no members of scheduled tribes were recorded. The literacy rate of the village was 41% (394 men and 186 women). 449 people were classified as main workers (323 men and 126 women), while 175 people were classified as marginal workers (99 men and 76 women); the remaining 775 residents were non-workers. The breakdown of main workers by employment category was as follows: 262 cultivators (i.e. people who owned or leased their own land); 104 agricultural labourers (i.e. people who worked someone else's land in return for payment); 18 workers in livestock, forestry, fishing, hunting, plantations, orchards, etc.; 3 in mining and quarrying; 2 household industry workers; 1 worker employed in other manufacturing, processing, service, and repair roles; 4 construction workers; 22 employed in trade and commerce; 0 employed in transport, storage, and communications; and 33 in other services.
