= Marxist historiography =

Marxist historiography, or historical materialist historiography, is an influential school of historiography. The chief tenets of Marxist historiography include the centrality of social class, social relations of production in class-divided societies that struggle against each other, and economic constraints in determining historical outcomes (historical materialism). Marxist historians follow the tenets of the development of class-divided societies, especially modern capitalist ones.

Marxist historiography has developed in varied ways across different regional and political contexts. It has had unique trajectories of development in the Western world, the Soviet Union, and in India, as well as in the pan-Africanist and African-American traditions, adapting to these specific regional and political conditions in different ways. Marxist historiography has made contributions to the history of the working class, and the methodology of a history from below.

Marxist historiography is sometimes criticized as deterministic, in that it posits a direction of history, towards an end state of history as classless human society. Marxist historiography within Marxist circles is generally seen as a tool; its aim is to bring those it perceives as oppressed by history to self-consciousness, and to arm them with tactics and strategies from history. For these Marxists, it is both a historical and a liberatory project.

Not all Marxist historiography is socialist. Methods from Marxist historiography, such as class analysis, can be divorced from the original political intents of Marxism and its perceived deterministic nature; historians who use Marxist methodology but disagree with the politics of Marxism often describe themselves as Marxian historians, and practitioners of this Marxian historiography often refer to their techniques as Marxian.

== Marx and Engels ==
Friedrich Engels' (1820–1895) most important historical contribution to the development of Marxist historiography was Der Deutsche Bauernkrieg (The Peasant War in Germany, 1850), which analysed social warfare in early Protestant Germany in terms of emerging capitalist classes. Although The German Peasants' War was overdetermined and lacked a rigorous engagement with archival sources, it exemplifies an early Marxist interest in history from below and in class analysis; it also attempts a dialectical analysis.

Karl Marx (1818–1883) contributed important works on social and political history, including The Eighteenth Brumaire of Louis Napoleon (1852), The Communist Manifesto (1848), The German Ideology (written in 1845, published in 1932), and those chapters of Das Kapital (1867–1894) dealing with the historical emergence of capitalists and proletarians from pre-industrial English society.

== Labour and class struggle ==
The key to understanding Marxist historiography is his view of labour. For Marx "historical reality is none other than objectified labour, and all conditions of labour given by nature, including the organic bodies of people, are merely preconditions and 'disappearing moments' of the labour process." This emphasis on the physical as the determining factor in history represents a break from virtually all previous historians. Until Marx developed his theory of historical materialism, the overarching determining factor in the direction of history was some sort of divine agency. In Marx's view of history "God became a mere projection of human imagination" and more importantly "a tool of oppression". There was no more sense of divine direction to be seen. History moved by the sheer force of human labour, and all theories of divine nature were a concoction of the ruling powers to keep the working people in check. For Marx, "The first historical act is... the production of material life itself." As one might expect, Marxist history not only begins with labour, it ends in production: "history does not end by being resolved into "self-consciousness" as "spirit of the spirit," but that in it at each stage there is found a material result: a sum of productive forces, a historically created relation of individuals to nature and to one another, which is handed down to each generation from its predecessor..." For further, and much more comprehensive, information on this topic, see historical materialism.

== Historical materialism ==
=== Introduction ===
Historical materialism is a methodology to understand human societies and their development throughout history. Marx's theory of history locates historical change in the rise of class societies and the way humans labour together to make their livelihoods. Marx argues that the introduction of new technologies and new ways of doing things to improve production eventually lead to new social classes which in turn result in political crises which can threaten the established order.

Marx's view of history is in contrast to the commonplace notion that the rise and fall of kingdoms, empires and states, can broadly be explained by the actions, ambitions and policies of the people at the top of society; kings, queens, emperors, generals, or religious leaders. This view of history is summed up by the 19th-century Scottish philosopher Thomas Carlyle who wrote "the history of the world is nothing but the biography of great men". An alternative to the "great man" theory is that history is shaped by the motivating force of "great ideas" – the struggle of reason over superstition or the fight for democracy and freedom.

The "great man" and "great women" theory of history and the view that history is primarily shaped by ideas has provoked no end of debate but many historians have believed there are more fundamental patterns at play beneath historical events.

Marx asserted that the material conditions of a society's mode of production, or in Marxist terms a society's productive forces and relations of production, fundamentally determine society's organization and development including the political commitments, cultural ideas and values that dominate in any society.

Marx argues that there is a fundamental conflict between the class of people who create the wealth of society and those who have ownership or control of the means of production, decide how society's wealth and resources are to be used and have a monopoly of political and military power. Historical materialism provides a profound challenge to the view that the historical process has come to a close and that capitalism is the end of history. Since Marx's time, the theory has been modified and expanded. It now has many Marxist and non-Marxist variants.

The main modes of production that Marx identified generally include primitive communism, slave society, feudalism, mercantilism, and capitalism. In each of these social stages, people interacted with nature and production in different ways. Any surplus from that production was distributed differently as well. To Marx, ancient societies (e.g. Rome and Greece) were based on a ruling class of citizens and a class of slaves; feudalism was based on nobles and serfs; and capitalism based on the capitalist class (bourgeoisie) and the working class (proletariat).

=== Description ===
The discovery of the materialist conception of history, or rather, the consistent continuation and extension of materialism into the domain of social phenomenon, removed two chief defects of earlier historical theories. In the first place, they at best examined only the ideological motives of the historical activity of human beings, without grasping the objective laws governing the development of the system of social relations. ... in the second place, the earlier theories did not cover the activities of the masses of the population, whereas historical materialism made it possible for the first time to study with scientific accuracy the social conditions of the life of the masses and the changes in these conditions.

— Russian Marxist theoretician and revolutionary Vladimir Lenin, 1913

Society does not consist of individuals, but expresses the sum of interrelations, the relations within which these individuals stand.

— Karl Marx, Grundrisse, 1858

In the Marxian view, human history is like a river. From any given vantage point, a river looks much the same day after day. But actually it is constantly flowing and changing, crumbling its banks, widening and deepening its channel. The water seen one day is never the same as that seen the next. Some of it is constantly being evaporated and drawn up, to return as rain. From year to year these changes may be scarcely perceptible. But one day, when the banks are thoroughly weakened and the rains long and heavy, the river floods, bursts its banks, and may take a new course. This represents the dialectical part of Marx's famous theory of dialectical (or historical) materialism.

— Hubert Kay, Life, 1948

Historical materialism builds upon the idea of historical progress that became popular in philosophy during the Enlightenment, which asserted that the development of human society has progressed through a series of stages, from hunting and gathering, through pastoralism and cultivation, to commercial society. Historical materialism rests on a foundation of dialectical materialism, in which matter is considered primary and ideas, thought, and consciousness are secondary, i.e. consciousness and human ideas about the universe result from material conditions rather than vice versa. Marxism uses this materialist methodology, referred to by Marx and Engels as the materialist conception of history and later better known as historical materialism, to analyse the underlying causes of societal development and change from the perspective of the collective ways in which humans make their living.

Historical materialism springs from a fundamental underlying reality of human existence: that in order for subsequent generations of human beings to survive, it is necessary for them to produce and reproduce the material requirements of everyday life. Marx then extended this premise by asserting the importance of the fact that, in order to carry out production and exchange, people have to enter into very definite social relations, or more specifically, "relations of production". However, production does not get carried out in the abstract, or by entering into arbitrary or random relations chosen at will, but instead are determined by the development of the existing forces of production.

How production is accomplished depends on the character of society's productive forces, which refers to the means of production such as the tools, instruments, technology, land, raw materials, and human knowledge and abilities in terms of using these means of production. The relations of production are determined by the level and character of these productive forces present at any given time in history. In all societies, Human beings collectively work on nature but, especially in class societies, do not do the same work. In such societies, there is a division of labour in which people not only carry out different kinds of labour but occupy different social positions on the basis of those differences. The most important such division is that between manual and intellectual labour whereby one class produces a given society's wealth while another is able to monopolize control of the means of production and so both governs that society and lives off of the wealth generated by the labouring classes.

Marx's account of the theory is in The German Ideology (1845) and in the preface A Contribution to the Critique of Political Economy (1859). All constituent features of a society (social classes, political pyramid and ideologies) are assumed to stem from economic activity, forming what is considered as the base and superstructure. The base and superstructure metaphor describes the totality of social relations by which humans produce and re-produce their social existence. According to Marx, the "sum total of the forces of production accessible to men determines the condition of society" and forms a society's economic base.

The base includes the material forces of production such as the labour, means of production and relations of production, i.e. the social and political arrangements that regulate production and distribution. From this base rises a superstructure of legal and political "forms of social consciousness" that derive from the economic base that conditions both the superstructure and the dominant ideology of a society. Conflicts between the development of material productive forces and the relations of production provokes social revolutions, whereby changes to the economic base leads to the social transformation of the superstructure.

This relationship is reflexive, in that the base initially gives rise to the superstructure and remains the foundation of a form of social organization. Those newly formed social organizations can then act again upon both parts of the base and superstructure so that rather than being static, the relationship is dialectic, expressed and driven by conflicts and contradictions. Engels clarified: "The history of all hitherto existing society is the history of class struggles. Freeman and slave, patrician and plebeian, lord and serf, guild-master and journeyman, in a word, oppressor and oppressed, stood in constant opposition to one another, carried on uninterrupted, now hidden, now open fight, a fight that each time ended, either in a revolutionary reconstitution of society at large, or in the common ruin of the contending classes."

Marx considered recurring class conflicts as the driving force of human history as such conflicts have manifested themselves as distinct transitional stages of development in Western Europe. Accordingly, Marx designated human history as encompassing four stages of development in relations of production:

1. Primitive communism: co-operative tribal societies.
2. Slave society: development of tribal to city-state in which aristocracy is born.
3. Feudalism: aristocrats are the ruling class while merchants evolve into the bourgeoisie.
4. Capitalism: capitalists are the ruling class, who create and employ the proletariat.

While historical materialism has been referred to as a materialist theory of history, Marx did not claim to have produced a master-key to history and that the materialist conception of history is not "an historico-philosophic theory of the marche générale, imposed by fate upon every people, whatever the historic circumstances in which it finds itself." In a letter to editor of the Russian newspaper paper Otetchestvennye Zapisky (1877), he explained that his ideas are based upon a concrete study of the actual conditions in Europe.

=== Summary ===
To summarize, history develops in accordance with the following observations:

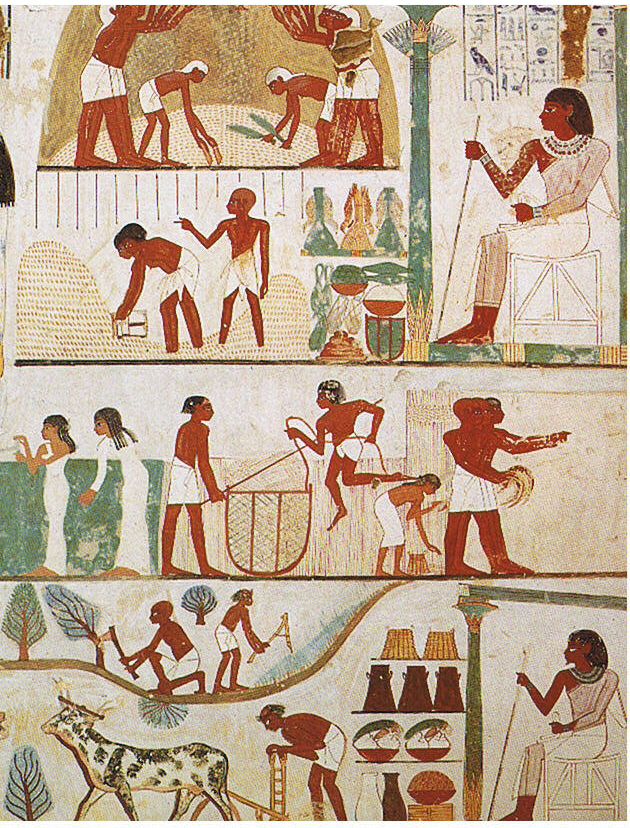
Scenes from the tomb of Nakht depicting an agricultural division of labour in Ancient Egypt, painted in the 15th century BC

1. Social progress is driven by progress in the material, productive forces a society has at its disposal (technology, labour, capital goods and so on)
2. Humans are inevitably involved in productive relations (roughly speaking, economic relationships or institutions), which constitute our most decisive social relations. These relations progress with the development of the productive forces. They are largely determined by the division of labour, which in turn tends to determine social class.
3. Relations of production are both determined by the means and forces of production and set the conditions of their development. For example, capitalism tends to increase the rate at which the forces develop and stresses the accumulation of capital.
4. The relations of production define the mode of production, e.g. the capitalist mode of production is characterized by the polarization of society into capitalists and workers.
5. The superstructure—the cultural and institutional features of a society, its ideological materials—is ultimately an expression of the mode of production on which the society is founded.
6. Every type of state is a powerful institution of the ruling class; the state is an instrument which one class uses to secure its rule and enforce its preferred relations of production and its exploitation onto society.
7. State power is usually only transferred (migrated) from one class to another by social and political agreements.
8. When a given relation of production no longer supports further progress in the productive forces, either further progress is strangled, or 'revolution' must occur.
9. The actual historical process is not predetermined but depends on class struggle, especially the elevation of class consciousness and organization of the working class.

== In the West ==
Karl Marx and Friedrich Engels worked in relative isolation together outside the larger mainstream. However, by the turn of the twentieth century, Marxist thought was perhaps the most prominent opposition to the idealist traditions.

R. H. Tawney (1880–1962) was an early historian working in this tradition. The Agrarian Problem in the Sixteenth Century (1912) and Religion and the Rise of Capitalism (1926), reflected his ethical concerns and preoccupations in economic history. He was profoundly interested in the issue of the enclosure of land in the English countryside in the sixteenth and seventeenth centuries and Max Weber's thesis on the connection between the appearance of Protestantism and the rise of capitalism. His belief in the rise of the gentry in the century before the outbreak of the Civil War in England provoked the "Storm over the Gentry" in which his methods were subjected to severe criticisms by Hugh Trevor-Roper and John Cooper.

A circle of historians inside the Communist Party of Great Britain (CPGB) was formed in 1946. It became a highly influential cluster of British Marxist historians, who shared a common interest in and contributed to history from below and class structure in early capitalist society. While some members of the group (most notably Christopher Hill [1912–2003] and E. P. Thompson [1924–1993]) left the CPGB after the 1956 Hungarian Revolution, the common points of British Marxist historiography continued in their works. They placed a great emphasis on the subjective determination of history. E. P. Thompson famously engaged Althusser in The Poverty of Theory, arguing that Althusser's theory overdetermined history, and left no space for historical revolt by the oppressed.

Christopher Hill's studies on 17th-century English history were widely acknowledged and recognized as representative of Marxist historians and Marxist historiography in general. His books include Puritanism and Revolution (1958), Intellectual Origins of the English Revolution (1965 and revised in 1996), The Century of Revolution (1961), AntiChrist in 17th-century England (1971), The World Turned Upside Down (1972) and many others.

E. P. Thompson pioneered the study of history from below in his work, The Making of the English Working Class, published in 1963. It focused on the forgotten history of the first working-class political left in the world in the late-18th and early-19th centuries. In his preface to this book, Thompson set out his approach to writing history from below:

I am seeking to rescue the poor stockinger, the Luddite cropper, the "obsolete" hand-loom weaver, the "Utopian" artisan, and even the deluded follower of Joanna Southcott, from the enormous condescension of posterity. Their crafts and traditions may have been dying. Their hostility to the new industrialism may have been backward-looking. Their communitarian ideals may have been fantasies. Their insurrectionary conspiracies may have been foolhardy. But they lived through these times of acute social disturbance, and we did not. Their aspirations were valid in terms of their own experience; and, if they were casualties of history, they remain, condemned in their own lives, as casualties.

Thompson's work was also significant because of the way he defined "class". He argued that class was not a structure, but a relationship that changed over time. Thompson's work is commonly considered the most influential work of history in the twentieth century and a crucial catalyst for social history and from social history to gender history and other studies of marginalized peoples. His essay, "Time, Work, Discipline, and Industrial Capitalism" is also hugely influential and argues that industrial capitalism fundamentally altered (and accelerated) humans' relationship to time. He opened the gates for a generation of labour historians, such as David Montgomery (1927–2011) and Herbert Gutman (1928–1985), who made similar studies of the American working classes.

Perhaps the best known of the Communist historians was Eric Hobsbawm (1917–2012). He is credited for establishing many of the basic historical arguments of current historiography and synthesizing huge amounts of modern historical data across time and space – most famously in his tetralogy: the first three books: The Age of Revolution, The Age of Capital, and The Age of Empire – covering "the long nineteenth century", followed by The Age of Extremes which focuses on "the short twentieth century". Hobsbawm's Bandits is another example of this group's work.

C. L. R. James (1901–1989) was also an early practitioner of approaches later termed "history from below". Living in Britain when he wrote his most notable work The Black Jacobins (1938), he was an anti-Stalinist Marxist and thus outside of the CPGB. The book provided a pioneering account of the only large-scale successful slave revolt in colonial American history, the Haitian Revolution, emphasizing the agency of the enslaved and challenging colonial narratives. It remains widely regarded as a classic of Marxist and Caribbean historiography for its narrative force and interpretive ambition, even as later research has refined aspects of its analysis.

Other important British Marxist historians included Raphael Samuel (1934–1996), A. L. Morton (1903–1987), and Brian Pearce (1915–2008).

In the United States, Marxist historiography greatly influenced the history of slavery and labour history. Marxist historiography also greatly influenced French historians, including France's most famous and enduring historian Fernand Braudel (1902–1985), as well as Italian historians, most famously the Autonomous Marxist and micro-history fields.

== In the Soviet Union ==
Soviet-era historiography was deeply influenced by Marxism. Marxism maintains that the moving forces of history are determined by material production and the rise of different socioeconomic formations. Applying this perspective to socioeconomic formations such as slavery and feudalism is a major methodological principle of orthodox Marxist historiography. Based on this principle, historiography predicts that there will be an abolition of capitalism by a socialist revolution made by the working class. Soviet historians believed that Marxist–Leninist theory permitted the application of categories of dialectical and historical materialism in the study of historical events.

However Soviet historiography was significantly influenced by the strict control by the authorities aimed at propaganda and Soviet power as well, as a result Marxist historiography suffered in the Soviet Union, as the government required overdetermined historical writing. Soviet historians tended to avoid contemporary history (after 1903) where possible, and effort was predominantly directed at pre-modern history (before 1850). As history was considered to be a politicized academic discipline, historians limited their creative output to avoid prosecution. Since the late 1930s, Soviet historiography treated the party line and reality as one and the same. As such, if it was a science, it was a science in service of a specific political and ideological agenda, commonly employing historical negationism. In the 1930s, historical archives were closed and original research was severely restricted. Historians were required to pepper their works with references—appropriate or not—to Stalin and other "Marxist–Leninist classics", and to pass judgment—as prescribed by the Party—on pre-revolution historic Russian figures. Nikita Khrushchev commented that "Historians are dangerous and capable of turning everything upside down. They have to be watched."

The Soviet interpretation of Marxism predetermined much of the research done by historians. Research by scholars in the USSR was limited to a large extent due to this predetermination. Some Soviet historians could not offer non-Marxist theoretical explanations that did not fit with the party's official ideology for their interpretation of sources. This was true even when alternate theories had a greater explanatory power in relation to a historian's reading of source material.

Marx and Engels' ideas of the importance of class struggle in history, the destiny of the working class, and the role of the dictatorship of the proletariat and the revolutionary party are of major importance in Marxist methodology.

Marxist–Leninist historiography has several aspects. It explains the social basis of historical knowledge, determines the social functions of historical knowledge and the means by which these functions are carried out, and emphasizes the need to study concepts in connection with the social and political life of the period in which these concepts were developed.

It studies the theoretical and methodological features in every school of historical thought. Marxist–Leninist historiography analyses the source-study basis of a historical work, the nature of the use of sources, and specific research methods. It analyses problems of historical research as the most important sign of the progress and historical knowledge and as the expression of the socioeconomic and political needs of a historical period.

The Marxist theory of historical materialism identified means of production as chief determinants of the historical process. They led to the creation of social classes, and class struggle was the motor of history. The sociocultural evolution of societies was considered to progress inevitably from slavery, through feudalism and capitalism to socialism and finally communism. In addition, Leninism argued that a vanguard party was required to lead the working class in the revolution that would overthrow capitalism and replace it with socialism.

Soviet historiography interpreted this theory to mean that the creation of the Soviet Union was the most important turning event in human history, since the USSR was considered to be the first socialist society. Furthermore, the Communist Party – considered to be the vanguard of the working class – was given the role of permanent leading force in society, rather than a temporary revolutionary organization. As such, it became the protagonist of history, which could not be wrong. Hence the unlimited powers of the Communist Party leaders were claimed to be as infallible and inevitable as the history itself. It also followed that a worldwide victory of communist countries is inevitable. All research had to be based on those assumptions and could not diverge in its findings. In 1956, Soviet academician Anna Pankratova said that "the problems of Soviet historiography are the problems of our Communist ideology."

Soviet historians have also been criticized for a Marxist bias in the interpretation of other historical events, unrelated to the Soviet Union. Thus, for example, they assigned to the rebellions in the Roman Empire the characteristics of the social revolution.

Often, the Marxist bias and propaganda demands came into conflict: hence the peasant rebellions against the early Soviet rule, such as the Tambov Rebellion of 1920–21, were simply ignored as inconvenient politically and contradicting the official interpretation of the Marxist theories.

Notable histories include the Short Course History of the Communist Party of the Soviet Union (Bolshevik), published in 1938, which was written to justify the nature of Bolshevik party life under Joseph Stalin. This work crystallised the piatichlenka or five acceptable moments of history in terms of vulgar dialectical materialism: primitive-communism, slavery, feudalism, capitalism and socialism.

== In China ==
Most Chinese history that is published in the People's Republic of China (PRC) is based on a Marxist interpretation of history. These theories were first applied in the 1920s by Chinese scholars such as Guo Moruo and became orthodoxy in academic study after 1949. The Marxist view of history is that history is governed by universal laws and that according to these laws, a society moves through a series of stages, with the transition between stages being driven by class struggle. These stages are:

- Slave society
- Feudal society
- Capitalist society
- Socialist society
- The world communist society

The official historical view within the People's Republic of China associates each of these stages with a particular era in Chinese history.

- Labour society (digital) – Xia to Shang
- Feudal society (decentralized) – Zhou to Sui
- Feudal society (bureaucratic) – Tang to the First Opium War
- Feudal society (semi-colonial) – First Opium War to end of Qing dynasty
- Capitalist society – Republican era
- Socialist society – PRC 1949 to present

Because of the strength of the Chinese Communist Party and the importance of the Marxist interpretation of history in legitimizing its rule, it was for many years difficult for historians within the PRC to actively argue in favour of non-Marxist and anti-Marxist interpretations of history. However, this political restriction is less confining than it may first appear in that the Marxist historical framework is surprisingly flexible, and it is a rather simple matter to modify an alternative historical theory to use language that at least does not challenge the Marxist interpretation of history.

Partly because of the interest of Mao Zedong, historians in the 1950s took a special interest in the role of peasant rebellions in Chinese history and compiled documentary histories to examine them.

There are several problems associated with imposing Marx's European-based framework on Chinese history. First, slavery existed throughout China's history but never as the primary form of labour. While the Zhou and earlier dynasties may be labeled as feudal, later dynasties were much more centralized than how Marx analysed their European counterparts as being. To account for the discrepancy, Chinese Marxists invented the term "bureaucratic feudalism". The placement of the Tang as the beginning of the bureaucratic phase rests largely on the replacement of patronage networks with the imperial examination. Some world-systems analysts, such as Janet Abu-Lughod, claim that analysis of Kondratiev waves shows that capitalism first arose in Song dynasty China, although widespread trade was subsequently disrupted and then curtailed.

The Japanese scholar Tanigawa Michio, writing in the 1970s and 1980s, set out to revise the generally Marxist views of China prevalent in post-war Japan. Tanigawa writes that historians in Japan fell into two schools. One held that China followed the set European pattern which Marxists thought to be universal; that is, from ancient slavery to medieval feudalism to modern capitalism; while another group argued that "Chinese society was extraordinarily saturated with stagnancy, as compared to the West" and assumed that China existed in a "qualitatively different historical world from Western society". That is, there is an argument between those who see "unilinear, monistic world history" and those who conceive of a "two-tracked or multi-tracked world history". Tanigawa reviewed the applications of these theories in Japanese writings about Chinese history and then tested them by analysing the Six Dynasties 220–589 CE period, which Marxist historians saw as feudal. He concluded that China did not have feudalism in the sense that Marxists use, that Chinese military governments did not lead to a European-style military aristocracy. The period established social and political patterns which shaped China's history from that point on.

There was a gradual relaxation of Marxist interpretation after the death of Mao in 1976, which was accelerated after the Tian'anmen Square protest and other revolutions in 1989, which damaged Marxism's ideological legitimacy in the eyes of Chinese academics.

== In India ==
In India, Marxist historiography takes the form of Marxian historiography, where Marxian techniques of analysis are used, though Marxist political intentions and prescriptions are discarded in most cases.

Bhupendranath Datta and Damodar Dharmananda Kosambi are considered the founding fathers of Marxist historiography in India. D. D. Kosambi, a polymath, viewed Indian History from a Marxist viewpoint. Other Indian scholars of Marxian historiography are Ram Sharan Sharma, Irfan Habib, Dwijendran Narayan Jha, Sumit Sarkar, Susobhan Sarkar and K. N. Panikkar. Historians such as Satish Chandra, Romila Thapar, Bipan Chandra, Arjun Dev, and Dineshchandra Sircar are sometimes referred to as influenced by the Marxian approach to history.

The Marxian historiography of India has focused on studies of economic development, land ownership, and class conflict in precolonial India and deindustrialisation during the colonial period.

One debate in Indian history that relates to a historical materialist schema is on the nature of feudalism in India. D. D. Kosambi in the 1960s outlined the idea of "feudalism from below" and "feudalism from above". An element of his feudalism thesis was rejected by R. S. Sharma in his monograph Indian Feudalism (2005) and various other books. However R. S. Sharma also largely agrees with Kosambi in his various other books. Most Indian Marxian historians argue that the economic origins of communalism are feudal remnants and the economic insecurities caused by slow development in India. B. R. Ambedkar criticised Marxists, as he deemed them to be unaware or ignorant of the specifics of caste issues.

Since the late 1990s, Hindu nationalist scholars have polemicised against the Marxian tradition in India for neglecting what they believe to be the country's illustrious past based on Vedic-Epic-Puranic chronology. An example of such works is Arun Shourie's Eminent Historians (1998). According to Amiya Kumar Bagchi, the Marxian school of Indian historiography is too ideologically influenced. Some have even alleged that some ultra-Marxist historians engaged in negationism when questioning the degree of violence and atrocities committed by Muslim rulers in the Indian Subcontinent.

== The effects of Marxist historiography ==
Marxist historiography has had an enormous influence on historiography, and compares with empiricist historiography as one of the basic and foundational historiographic methodologies. Most non-Marxist historians make use of tools developed within Marxist historiography, like dialectical analysis of social formations, class analysis, or the project of broadening the scope of history into social history. Marxist historiography provided the first sustained efforts at social history, and is still highly influential within this area. The contribution of class analysis has also led to the development of gender and race as other analytical tools.

Marxism was one of the key influences on the Annales school tradition of French historiography.

== See also ==
- Alltagsgeschichte
- Cleometrics
- Mode of production
- Historical materialism
- Philosophy of history
- Historical determinism
- Historicism
