= Citizens: A Chronicle of the French Revolution =

1989 book by Simon Schama

- Author: Simon Schama
- Language: English
- Subject: The French Revolution
- Publisher: Random House
- Publication date: 1989
- Publication place: United Kingdom
- Media type: Print (Hardcover and Paperback)
- ISBN: 0-679-72610-1
- OCLC: 20454968
- Dewey Decimal: 944.04 20
- LC Class: DC148 .S43 1990

Citizens: A Chronicle of the French Revolution is a book by the historian Simon Schama, published in 1989, the bicentenary of the French Revolution. In the book, Schama declared, "The terror was merely 1789 with a higher body count; violence ... was not just an unfortunate side effect ... it was the Revolution's source of collective energy. It was what made the Revolution revolutionary." In short, "From the very beginning ... violence was the motor of revolution." Schama considers that the French Revolutionary Wars were the logical corollary of the universalistic language of the Declaration of the Rights of Man and of the Citizen, and of the universalistic principles of the Revolution which led to inevitable conflict with old-regime Europe.

== Reception ==
Marxist historian Eric Hobsbawm described the book in 1990 as being "exceptionally stylish and eloquent" and "extremely well-read." Nevertheless, he considered Citizens to be, above all, in his view a wrongful political denunciation of the revolution and a continuation of a tradition in British literature and popular consciousness (in his view established by the writings of Edmund Burke and others, reinforced by Charles Dickens' A Tale of Two Cities and promulgated in subsequent pop literature), which has defined the Revolution foremost by the Terror. In Hobsbawm's view, Schama failed to see the positive aspects of the revolution and had wrongfully focused solely on the horror and suffering, presenting them as gratuitous. Hobsbawm further criticized the book, opining that "Schama is not involved as an expert in the field, for ... the book does not set out to add to the knowledge already available. The author's choice of a narrative focused on particular people and incidents neatly sidesteps the problems of perspectives and generalization."

In his review published in Annales historiques de la Révolution française, Youngstown State University professor Morris Slavin, another Marxist historian, criticized the lack of sympathy displayed by Schama for "the revolutionaries in the real circumstances of a profound social and political crisis", arguing that he judged the events from the standpoint of royalist elites. Echoing Thomas Paine's comment on Edmund Burke, Slavin remarked: "He pities the plumage, but forgets the dying bird". Slavin found it "regrettable that such a capable historian as Schama ... should be so prejudiced against the Revolution".

Reviewing the book in the journal French Politics and Society, Robert Forster of Johns Hopkins University wrote that "Schama desacralized the Revolution ... by his inimitable style and wit". Forster praised Schama's analysis of key issues and his descriptive talents, though he criticized what he saw as Schama's overly favorable picture of the French economy and society on the eve of the revolution.

English historian T. C. W. Blanning, who served as Professor of Modern European History at the University of Cambridge, wrote "This extraordinary book identifies and conveys the essence of the Revolution, the key to its appeal, the secret of its power, and the reason for its eventual failure: violence. An astonishing tour de force."

== See also ==
- Historiography of the French Revolution
- The French Revolution: A History by Thomas Carlyle (1837)
- The Old Regime and the Revolution by Alexis de Tocqueville (1856)
- The Oxford History of the French Revolution by William Doyle (1989)
- Echoes of the Marseillaise by Eric Hobsbawm (1990)
