= Social banditry =

Lower-class social resistance

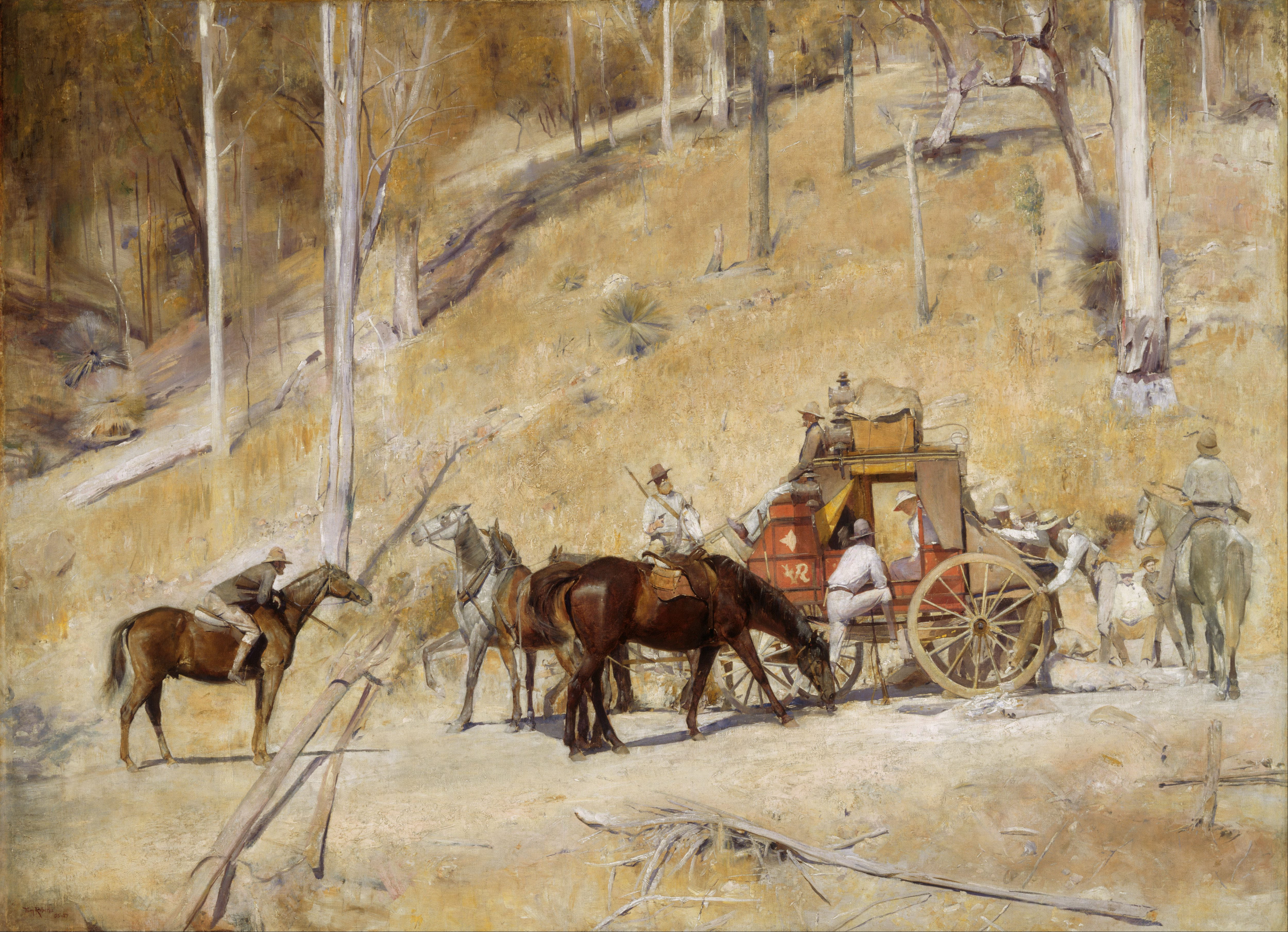
In Bailed Up (1895), Australian Impressionist painter Tom Roberts shows bushrangers holding up a stagecoach and conversing with its occupants.

Social banditry or social crime is a form of social resistance involving behavior that by law is illegal but is supported by wider "oppressed" society as moral and acceptable. The term "social bandit" was invented by the Marxist historian Eric Hobsbawm and introduced in his books Primitive Rebels (1959) and Bandits (1969). Hobsbawm characterized social banditry as a primitive form of class struggle and resistance in pre-industrial and frontier societies. Social banditry is a widespread phenomenon that has occurred in many societies throughout recorded history, and forms of social banditry still exist, as evidenced by piracy and organized crime syndicates. Later, social scientists have also discussed the term's applicability to more modern forms of crime, like street gangs and the economy associated with the trade in illegal drugs, or the Mafia.

== Hobsbawm's theory ==
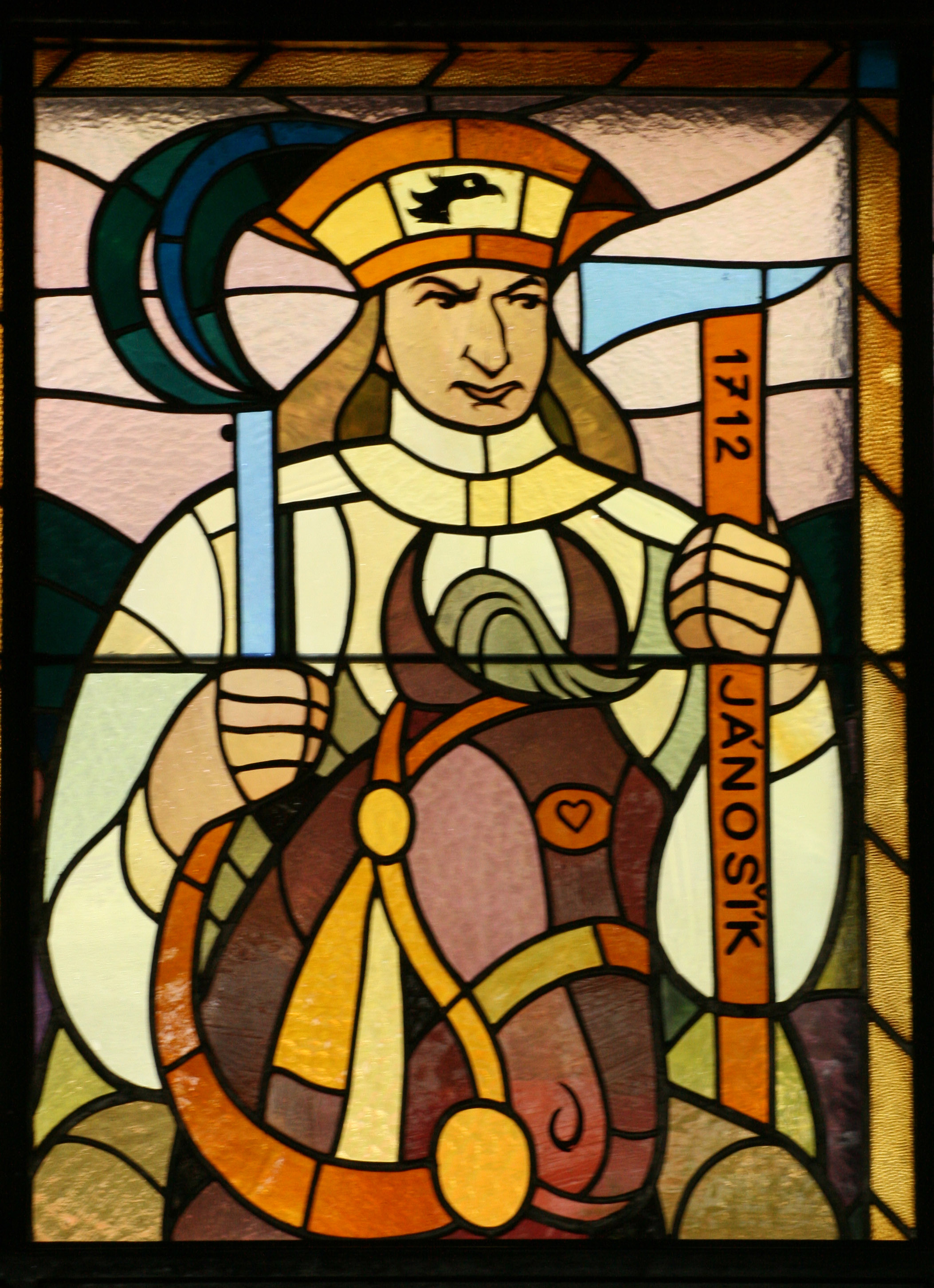
Juraj Jánošík, a Slovak bandit who became a folk hero

Hobsbawm's key thesis was that outlaws were individuals living on the edges of rural societies by robbing and plundering, who ordinary people often see as heroes or beacons of popular resistance. He called it a form of "pre-historic social movement", by contrast with the organized labour movement. Hobsbawm's book discusses the bandit as a symbol and mediated idea; some of the outlaws he refers to are Pancho Villa, Lampião, Ned Kelly, Dick Turpin, Juraj Jánošík, Sándor Rózsa, Billy the Kid, and Carmine Crocco, among others. The colloquial sense of an outlaw as bandit or brigand is the subject of the following passage by Hobsbawm:

The point about social bandits is that they are peasant outlaws whom the lord and state regard as criminals, but who remain within peasant society, and are considered by their people as heroes, as champions, avengers, fighters for justice, perhaps even leaders of liberation, and in any case as men to be admired, helped and supported. This relation between the ordinary peasant and the rebel, outlaw and robber is what makes social banditry interesting and significant ... Social banditry of this kind is one of the most universal social phenomena known to history.

== Criticism ==
Historians and anthropologists such as John S. Koliopoulos and Paul Sant Cassia have criticised the social bandit theory, emphasising the frequent use of bandits as armatoloi by Ottoman Turkish authorities in suppressing the peasantry in defence of the central Ottoman state. Sant Cassia observed that Mediterranean bandits "are often romanticized afterward through nationalistic rhetoric and texts which circulate and have a life of their own, giving them a permanence and potency which transcends their localized domain and transitory nature". In Hobsbawm's case, the romanticization of social banditry was political rather than nationalistic, yet the fluid, ambiguous figure of the bandit remains.

== Historical examples ==
- Robin Hood, legendary outlaw and English folk-hero
- Abrek, ethnic Chechen and Ingush anti-Cossack/Russian guerrilla lone raiders in the North Caucasus
- Betyárs, outlaws in the Kingdom of Hungary
- Brigandage in the Two Sicilies, peasant rebellion developed in Southern Italy during the 19th century
- Cangaço, outlaws in the Nordeste region of Brazil
- Dacoity, Indian bandits who portrayed themselves (and were portrayed by the media) as social bandits
- Expropriative anarchism, the practice of robbery and scams in Argentina and Spain
- Giuseppe Musolino, infamous Italian brigand from the Aspromonte region of Calabria
- Hajduk, outlaws in Central and Eastern Europe
- Klepht, ethnic Greek and Albanian anti-Ottoman insurgents in Greece and Cyprus during the 19th century
- Narcocorrido, Mexican narco-trafficker music derived from the norteño corrido tradition
- Ned Kelly, Australian bushranger and folk-hero
- Rapparee, Irish guerrillas active during the Cromwellian conquest and Williamite War
- Salvatore Giuliano, bandit and separatist leader in the autonomous Italian region of Sicily
- Sardinian banditry, the practice of robbery and kidnapping in the autonomous Italian region of Sardinia between the Late Middle Ages and the 20th century
- Uskoks, ethnic Croatian irregular soldiers serving the Habsburg monarchy during the anti-Ottoman resistance in the Balkans
- Veerappan, Indian bandit and poacher operating in the states of Karnataka, Kerala, and Tamil Nadu
- Si Pitung, Betawi people bandit and folk-hero in Batavia, Dutch East Indies (modern-day Jakarta, Indonesia)

== See also ==
- Anomie
- Conflict criminology
- Culture of honor
- Deviance (sociology)
- Illegalism
- Reactionary
- Subcultural theory
