= Revolutionary Spring =

2023 non-fiction book by Christopher Clark

Revolutionary Spring: Fighting for a New World 1848–1849
- Book cover
- Author: Christopher Clark
- Language: English
- Subject: Revolutions of 1848, History of Europe
- Genre: Non-fiction, history
- Publisher: Crown Publishing Group, Penguin Random House
- Publication date: 2023
- Pages: 896 pp (Hardcover)
- ISBN: 978-0525575207
- Website: Penguin Random House

Revolutionary Spring: Fighting for a New World 1848–1849 is a 2023 history book by Christopher Clark, and published by the Crown Books division of Penguin Random House in 2023. It explores the history of the European revolutions of 1848.

== Structure ==
The book is organized into an introduction titled "The Power of Place," followed by nine thematic chapters and a conclusion titled "The Seeds of the Future." The chapters include: (1) The Social Question; (2) The Order of Things; (3) An Anatomy of the Pre-Revolutionary State; (4) The Path to Revolution; (5) The First Outbreaks; (6) The European Moment; (7) The End of the Beginning; (8) The Great Counter-Offensive; and (9) The Struggle for the End of the World.

== Reception ==
Revolutionary Spring received generally positive reviews from major publications. Writing for The Guardian, Kenan Malik described the work as a "panoramic account" that explores how the 1848 revolts reshaped Europe. In The New York Times, Ariane Zevin noted the book's focus on the significance of these revolutions in a modern context. Other critics, such as those for The Economist and The Times Literary Supplement, highlighted the book's "drama and daring" and its "panoramic" scope.

== See also ==
=== Revolutions during 1848 ===
- French Revolution of 1848
- German revolutions of 1848–1849
- Hungarian Revolution of 1848
- Sicilian revolution of 1848
- Revolutions of 1848 in the Italian states
- Revolutions of 1848 in the Austrian Empire
- Moldavian Revolution of 1848
- Wallachian Revolution of 1848

=== Similar or related works ===
- The Pursuit of Power by Richard J. Evans
- The Age of Revolution: 1789-1848 by Eric Hobsbawm
