= The Age of Capital: 1848–1875 =

1975 history book by Eric Hobsbawm

- First edition (US)
- Author: Eric Hobsbawm
- Cover artist: Edgar Degas, A Cotton Office in New Orleans, 1873
- Language: English
- Subject: History
- Publisher: Weidenfeld & Nicolson (UK); Charles Scribner's Sons (U.S.)
- Publication date: 1975
- Publication place: United Kingdom, United States
- Pages: 384
- ISBN: 978-0-297-76992-7
- Preceded by: The Age of Revolution: Europe 1789–1848
- Followed by: The Age of Empire: 1875–1914

The Age of Capital: 1848–1875 is a book by Eric Hobsbawm, first published in 1975. It is the second in a trilogy of books about "the long 19th century" (coined by Hobsbawm), preceded by The Age of Revolution: Europe 1789–1848 and followed by The Age of Empire: 1875–1914. A fourth book, The Age of Extremes: The Short Twentieth Century, 1914–1991, acts as a sequel to the trilogy.

Hobsbawm analyzed the 19th and 20th century processes of modernization using what he calls the dual revolution thesis, which recognized the dual importance of the French Revolution and the Industrial Revolution as midwives of modern European history, and (through the connections of colonialism and imperialism) world history.

In his second installment in the trilogy, Hobsbawm picks up where he left off in The Age of Revolution: Europe 1789–1848 by delving first into the Revolutions of 1848, the so-called 'Springtime of Peoples', in Part I. He proceeds to outline the early, remarkable success of the 1848 revolutions before their ultimate collapse, suppression, or consolidation — in the case of France, the overthrow of the July Monarchy, the establishment of the Second Republic, and then its supersession by Louis Napoleon, who transformed himself from president of the Second Republic into emperor Napoleon III of the Second French Empire.

In Part II and Part III, Hobsbawm traces the rise of modern "capitalism," a word which he states first entered the economic and political vocabulary of the world in the 1860s. The Great Boom of chapter 2 covers the dramatic economic transformation and expansion of the years from 1848 to the early 1870s, an economic boom that he argues helped provide European governments, nearly brought to the brink by revolution in 1848–1849, "breathing-space" to recover and stabilize their regimes and domestic societies. As the economy expanded and began to penetrate parts of the world that had never truly been integrated into the global economic system, Hobsbawm argues that the period covered by The Age of Capital: 1848–1875 witnessed the first steps towards what we would call globalization. As a result of this expansion and penetration, there emerged so-called "Losers" and "Winners" from the process.

Domestically, the period 1848 to 1875, Hobsbawm argues, was one that witnessed the seeming triumph of "reason, science, progress and liberalism," and especially bourgeois ideas and preeminence. He therefore sees this period as somewhat of an exceptional interlude, between the tumults of the Age of Revolution (1789–1848) and the economic disruption and socio-political radicalization of the Age of Empire (1875–1914). Hobsbawm's "Age of Capital" was by no means stagnant or tranquil: It witnessed major if short international conflicts such as the Crimean War, the Italian and German wars of unification, the much longer American Civil War, and the devastating Taiping Rebellion in China. But social conflict and social revolution subsided during the period after 1848 to the early 1870s, with the most notable development being mainly the establishment and growth of the one socialist, mass labor movement of the era — Ferdinand Lassalle's General German Workers Association after 1863.

The book concludes with the ending of the Great Boom in the early 1870s, with what in America has been called the Panic of 1873 and, in countries like Great Britain, the Long Depression, running anywhere from 1873 to 1879 or even 1873 to 1896, depending on the metrics used. Hobsbawm sees the 1870s not as a sharp break in history, but a watershed: An evolution away from the unrestrained competitive private enterprise, free from government intervention, towards a landscape of economic cartelization, industrial corporations, increased government intervention in domestic economies and protectionism against international economic competitors, as opposed to the free trade ideals of the mid-19th century. Social revolution, which had died down after the Revolutions of 1848, would rear its head in the form of the Paris Commune of 1871; but serious social unrest, social revolution, and political radicalization (such as the emergence of a new right-wing form of nationalism) would only come to the fore in the next era, the Age of Empire (1875–1914), as the seeds sewn during the Age of Capital would finally be reaped amid the revolutions in the Persian Empire, Mexico, China, the Russian Empire and the Great War.

== Contents ==
- Part I. Revolutionary Prelude
  - 1. 'The Springtime of Peoples'
- Part II. Developments
  - 2. The Great Boom
  - 3. The World United
  - 4. Conflicts and War
  - 5. Building Nations
  - 6. The Forces of Democracy
  - 7. Losers
  - 8. Winners
  - 9. Changing Society
- Part III. Results
  - 10. The Land
  - 11. Men Moving
  - 12. City, Industry, the Working Class
  - 13. The Bourgeois World
  - 14. Science, Religion, Ideology
  - 15. The Arts
  - 16. Conclusion
