= Primitive Rebels =

1959 book Eric Hobsbawm

Primitive Rebels: Studies in Archaic Forms of Social Movement in the 19th and 20th Centuries
- Author: Eric Hobsbawm
- Subject: European history, social history
- Publisher: Manchester University Press
- Publication date: 1959
- Pages: 208
- OCLC: 30390151

Primitive Rebels is a 1959 book by Eric Hobsbawm on pre-modern European social movements and social banditry.

== Editions and translations ==
The book was originally published by Manchester University Press in 1959 and released in 1960 in the United States by Free Press of Glencoe, Illinois under an alternative main title: Social Bandits and Primitive Rebels, which emphasised the concept of the social bandit created by Hobsbawm in the book. The 1971 edition by Manchester University Press, numbered as the third but being the only amended one, includes a new preface and minor changes to the text.

The book's French translation appeared still in 1959 as Les Primitifs de la révolte dans l'Europe moderne (Paris: Fayard). The German rendition by Renate Müller-Isenburg and Charles Barry Hyams followed in 1962 (Sozialrebellen. Archaische Sozialbewegungen im 19. und 20. Jahrhundert, Neuwied: Luchterhand).

A 2017 reprint by Abacus carries a new introduction by Owen Jones (ISBN 9780349143019).
