= Kristin Gjesdal =

Norwegian philosopher

- Born: Oslo, Norway
- Education: University of Oslo (Ph.D., 2002)
- Era: Contemporary philosophy
- Region: Western philosophy
- School: Continental philosophy Hermeneutics
- Institutions: Temple University
- Main interests: Hermeneutics, nineteenth-century philosophy

Kristin Gjesdal is a Norwegian philosopher and Professor of Philosophy at Temple University. She is known for her expertise in the field of hermeneutics (focusing especially on Hans-Georg Gadamer), nineteenth-century philosophy, aesthetics, and phenomenology. Gjesdal is a member of The Norwegian Academy of Science and Letters and she serves on the editorial board of the Stanford Encyclopedia of Philosophy as a subject area expert for 19th Century Philosophy.

== Awards and honours ==
- Distinguished Anderson Fellow 2024 (University of Sydney)
- Fulbright Foundation fellowship
- Alexander von Humboldt Foundation fellowship
- Eleanor Hofkin Award for Excellence in Teaching

== Books ==
- Herder's Hermeneutic Philosophy: History, Poetry, Enlightenment, Cambridge University Press, 2017
- Gadamer and The Legacy of German Idealism, Cambridge University Press, 2009
- The Drama of History: Ibsen, Hegel, Nietzsche, Oxford University Press, 2020
- Women Philosophers in the Long Nineteenth Century, Oxford University Press, 2021
