= The Age of Extremes =

1994 book by Eric Hobsbawm

The Age of Extremes: The Short Twentieth Century, 1914–1991
- Language: English
- Subject: History
- Publisher: Michael Joseph (UK); Vintage Books (U.S.)
- Publication date: 1994
- Publication place: United Kingdom, United States
- Pages: 640
- ISBN: 0-349-10671-1
- OCLC: 33817813
- Preceded by: The Age of Empire: 1875–1914

The Age of Extremes: The Short Twentieth Century, 1914–1991 is a book by Eric Hobsbawm, published in 1994. In it, Hobsbawm comments on what he sees as the disastrous failures of state socialism, capitalism, and nationalism; he offers an equally sceptical take on the progress of the arts and changes in society in the latter half of the twentieth century.

Hobsbawm calls the period from the start of World War I to the fall of the Soviet bloc "the short twentieth century", to follow on "the long 19th century", the period from the start of the French Revolution in 1789 to the start of World War I in 1914, which he covered in an earlier trilogy of histories (The Age of Revolution: Europe, 1789–1848, The Age of Capital: 1848–1875, The Age of Empire: 1875–1914). In the United States, the book was published with the subtitle A History of the World, 1914–1991 (ISBN 978-0-679-73005-7).

== Contents ==
- Part I. The Age of Catastrophe
  - 1. The Age of Total War
  - 2. The World Revolution
  - 3. Into the Economic Abyss
  - 4. The Fall of Liberalism
  - 5. Against the Common Enemy
  - 6. The Arts 1914–1945
  - 7. End of Empires
- Part II. The Golden Age
  - 8. Cold War
  - 9. The Golden Years
  - 10. The Social Revolution 1945–1990
  - 11. Cultural Revolution
  - 12. The Third World
  - 13. "Real Socialism"
- Part III. The Landslide
  - 14. The Crisis Decades
  - 15. Third World and Revolution
  - 16. End of Socialism
  - 17. The Avant-Garde Dies: The Arts After 1950
  - 18. Sorcerers and Apprentices: The Natural Sciences
  - 19. Towards the Millennium

== Failure of prediction ==
Hobsbawm points out the abysmal record of recent attempts to predict the world's future. "The record of forecasters in the past thirty or forty years, whatever their professional qualification as prophets, has been so spectacularly bad that only governments and economic research institutes still have, or pretend to have, much confidence in it." He quotes President Calvin Coolidge, in a message to Congress on December 4, 1928, on the eve of the Great Depression, as saying "The country can regard the present with satisfaction and anticipate the future with optimism."

Speaking of the future himself, Hobsbawm largely confines himself to predicting continued turmoil: "The world of the third millennium will therefore almost certainly continue to be one of violent politics and violent political changes. The only thing uncertain about them is where they will lead," and expressing the view that "If humanity is to have a recognizable future, it cannot be by prolonging the past or the present."

In one of his few more concrete predictions, he writes that "Social distribution and not growth would dominate the politics of the new millennium."

== Failure of communism ==
The Russian Revolution of 1917 was not the revolution of the most advanced capitalist societies predicted by Karl Marx. As Hobsbawm, puts it, "Capitalism had proved far easier to overthrow where it was weak or barely existed than in its heartlands." Even within Russia, Hobsbawm doubts the ostensibly "progressive" effects of the revolution: "What remained [after revolution and civil war] was a Russia even more firmly anchored in the past... [W]hat actually governed the country was an undergrowth of smaller and larger bureaucracy, on average even less educated and qualified than before."

It is a central thesis of Hobsbawm's book that, from the start, State Socialism betrayed the socialist and internationalist vision it claimed to uphold. In particular, State Socialism always dispensed with the democratic element of the socialist vision: "Lenin... concluded from the start that the liberal horse was not a runner in the Russian revolutionary race." This anti-liberalism ran deep. In 1933, with Benito Mussolini firmly in control of Italy, "Moscow insisted that the Italian communist leader Palmiro Togliatti withdraw the suggestion that, perhaps, social-democracy was not the primary danger, at least in Italy."

As for support for international revolution, "The communist revolutions actually made (Yugoslavia, Albania, later China) were made against Stalin's advice. The Soviet view was that, both internationally and within each country, post-war politics should continue within the framework of the all-embracing anti-fascist alliance.... There is no doubt that Stalin meant all this seriously, and tried to prove it by dissolving the Comintern in 1943, and the Communist Party of the United States in 1944. "[T]he Chinese Communist regime, though it criticised the USSR for betraying revolutionary movements after the break between the two countries, has no comparable record of practical support for Third World liberation movements."

On the other hand, he is no friend of the Maoist doctrine of perpetual revolution: "Mao was fundamentally convinced of the importance of struggle, conflict and high tension as something that was not only essential to life but prevented the relapse into the weaknesses of the old Chinese society, whose very insistence on unchanging permanence and harmony had been its weakness." Hobsbawm draws a straight line from this belief to the disastrous Great Leap Forward and the subsequent Chinese famine of 1959–1961.

Socialism, Hobsbawm argues, ultimately fell because, eventually, "...hardly anyone believed in the system or felt any loyalty to it, not even those who governed it."

== End of imperialism ==
Hobsbawm has very mixed feelings about the end of the nineteenth-century imperial order, largely because he is no happier with the nation-states that replaced the empires. "[World War I]... had made the habitual and sensible process of international negotiation suspect as 'secret diplomacy'. This was largely a reaction against the secret treaties arranged among the Allies during the war... The Bolsheviks, discovering these sensitive documents in the Tsarist archives, had promptly published them for the world to read."

"The botched peace settlements after 1918 multiplied what we, at the end of the twentieth century, know to be the fatal virus of democracy, namely the division of the body of citizens exclusively along ethnic-national or religious lines." "The reductio ad absurdum of... anti-colonialist logic was the attempt by an extremist Jewish fringe group in Palestine to negotiate with the Germans (via Damascus, then under the Vichy French) for help in liberating Palestine from the British, which they regarded as the top priority for Zionism. (A militant of the group involved in this mission eventually became prime minister of Israel: Yitzhak Shamir.)"

== Failure of free-market capitalism ==
None of this throws Hobsbawm into the embrace of free-market capitalism: "Those of us who lived through the years of the Great Slump still find it almost impossible to understand how the orthodoxies of the pure free market, then so obviously discredited, once again came to preside over a global period of depression in the late 1980s and 1990s, which once again, they were equally unable to understand or to deal with."

"As it happened, the regimes most deeply committed to laissez-faire economics were also sometimes, and notably in the case of Reagan's United States and Thatcher's Britain, profoundly and viscerally nationalist and distrustful of the outside world. The historian cannot but note that the two attitudes are contradictory." He points up the irony that "[T]he most dynamic and rapidly growing economy of the globe after the fall of Soviet socialism was that of Communist China, leading Western business-school lectures and the authors of management manuals, a flourishing genre of literature, to scan the teachings of Confucius for the secrets of entrepreneurial success."

Ultimately, in world terms, he sees capitalism being just as much of a failure as state socialism: "The belief, following neoclassical economics, that unrestricted international trade would allow the poorer countries to come closer to the rich, runs counter to historical experience as well as common sense. [The examples of successful export-led Third World industrialization usually quoted – Hong Kong, Singapore, Taiwan and South Korea — represent less than two percent of the Third World population]." (brackets in the original)

== Fascism ==
Denying fascism's claim to philosophical respectability, Hobsbawm writes: "Theory was not the strong point of movements devoted to the inadequacies of reason and rationalism and the superiority of instinct and will", and further on the same page: "Mussolini could have readily dispensed with his house philosopher, Giovanni Gentile, and Hitler probably neither knew nor cared about the support of the philosopher Heidegger." Instead, he claims, the popular appeal of fascism lay with its claims to technocratic achievement: "Was not the proverbial argument in favour of fascist Italy that 'Mussolini made the trains run on time'?"

He also writes: "Would the horror of the holocaust be any less if historians concluded that it exterminated not six millions but five or even four?"

== Hobsbawm's use of statistics ==
Hobsbawm often uses statistics to paint a broad picture of a society at a particular time. With reference to the contemporary United States (at the time of writing) he points out, "In 1991, 58 per cent of all black families in the USA were headed by a single woman and 70 per cent of all children were born to single mothers," and "In 1991 15 per cent of what was proportionally the largest prison population in the world—426 prisoners per 100,000 population—were said to be mentally ill."

He finds damning statistics to back up his claim of the total failure of state socialism to promote the general welfare:

In 1969, Austrians, Finns and Poles could expect to die at the same average age (70.1 years) but in 1989, Poles had a life expectancy about four years shorter than Austrians and Finns ...The great [Chinese] famine of 1959–61, probably the greatest famine of the twentieth century.... According to official Chinese statistics, the country's population in 1959 was 672.07 millions. At the natural growth rate of the preceding seven years, which was at least 20 per thousand per year, one would have expected the Chinese population in 1961 to have been 699 millions. In fact it was 658.59 millions or forty millions [emphasis in the original] less than might have been expected

Similarly

Brazil, a monument to social neglect, had a GNP per capita almost two-and-a-half as large as Sri Lanka in 1939, and over six times as large at the end of the 1980s. In Sri Lanka, which had subsidized basic foodstuffs and given free education and health care until the later 1970s, the average newborn could expect to live several years longer than the average Brazilian, and to die as an infant at about half the Brazilian rate in 1969, at a third of the Brazilian rate in 1989. The percentage of illiteracy in 1989 was about twice as great in Brazil as on the Asian island.

== Hobsbawm on the arts ==
Hobsbawm writes on Post-war modernist art practice:

"...consisted largely in a series of increasingly desperate gimmicks by which artists sought to give their work an immediately recognisable individual trademark, a succession of manifestos of despair... or of gestures reducing the sort of art which was primarily bought for investment and its collectors ad absurdum, as by adding an individual's name to piles of brick or soil ('minimal art') or by preventing it from becoming such a commodity through making it too short-lived to be permanent ('performance art').

"The smell of impending death rose from these avant-gardes. The future was no longer theirs, though nobody knew whose it was. More than ever, they knew themselves to be on the margin."

== Hobsbawm on popular culture ==
Hobsbawm also comments on popular culture, a subject he has left alone in other books. He writes, "Buddy Holly, Janis Joplin, Brian Jones of the Rolling Stones, Bob Marley, Jimi Hendrix and a number of other popular divinities fell victim of a life-style designed for early death. What made such deaths symbolic was that youth, which they represented, was impermanent by definition." Of these, Joplin's and Hendrix's deaths were drug-related; Jones's may have been (the coroner's verdict was "death by misadventure"; there has been much controversy surrounding the events leading to his death); Holly died in a plane crash and Marley of cancer.

However, he does use youth culture as a lens to view the changes in the late-twentieth-century social order:

"The novelty of the new youth culture was threefold.

"First, 'youth' was not seen as a preparatory stage of adulthood but, in some sense, as the final stage of full human development. As in sport, the human activity in which youth is supreme, and which now defined the ambitions of more human beings than any other, life clearly went downhill after the age of thirty...

"The second novelty of the youth culture...: it was or became dominant in the 'developed market economies'... What children could learn from their parents became less obvious than what parents did not know and children did. The role of generations was reversed. Blue jeans..., pioneered... by students who did not wish to look like their elders, came to appear... below many a grey head.

"The third peculiarity of the new youth culture in urban societies was its astonishing internationalism... The English language of rock lyrics was often not even translated... The heartlands of Western youth culture themselves were the opposite of culturally chauvinist... They welcomed styles imported from the Caribbean, Latin America and, from the 1980s, increasingly Africa."

Hobsbawm goes on to write that "The cultural revolution of the latest twentieth century can thus best be understood as the triumph of the individual over society, or rather, the breaking of the threads which in the past had woven human beings into social textures" and evokes this as paralleling Margaret Thatcher's claim that 'There is no society, only individuals'.

== Reception ==
The book was praised for its broad scope and for its insights. Criticisms focused on the book's pessimism and Hobsbawm's alleged inability to appreciate capitalism's adaptability and contribution to living standards.

Edward Said called the book "unsettling and powerful" in the London Review of Books. He also wrote that Hobsbawm's own participation in the events he narrated added to the appeal of the book, and that there was a significant overlap of history and memory in it. Moreover, Said commended Hobsbawm's ability to draw conclusions from political and economic trends in the West, but criticised him for being unaware of relevant debates in the historical study of non-Western societies. In particular, Said criticised Hobsbawm's claim that politicised religion was an exclusively Muslim phenomenon. Said also lamented the lack of "a view from within" in the book, constructed with the experiences of witnesses and activists, as opposed to the large scale and impersonal overview that Hobsbawm offered.

Similarly to Said, M.E. Sharpe observed that the book was written as both history and memory. Sharpe also wrote that without historians like Hobsbawm we would be utterly lost.

Francis Fukuyama wrote in Foreign Affairs that "it was a work of great insight coupled with extraordinary blindness". He commended Hobsbawm's erudition and the book's breadth but he criticised him for failing to appreciate the strengths of capitalism. Fukuyama similarly disparaged Hobsbawm's preference for centralised governments. Finally, Fukuyama was also critical of the short space that the book dedicated to capitalist Asia.

Tony Judt, writing in the New York Review of Books, underlined Hobsbawm's impact on historical writing but criticised his Marxist convictions.

Lawrence Freedman wrote that the book set the standards for accounts of the twentieth century and praised it for its "powerful analysis" and "broad sweep". Nevertheless, Freedman thought that Hobsbawm was not justified in seeing capitalism as an unruly and intrinsically extremist force nor did he share Hobsbawm's worry about anarchy becoming triumphant in the post-cold-war world. In his reply to Freedman's review, Hobsbawm criticised Freedman for passing his ideological beliefs as historical judgements and defended his pessimism on the world's future.
