= Julia Hobsbawm =

British businesswoman, entrepreneur and writer (born 1964)

Julia Hobsbawm OBE
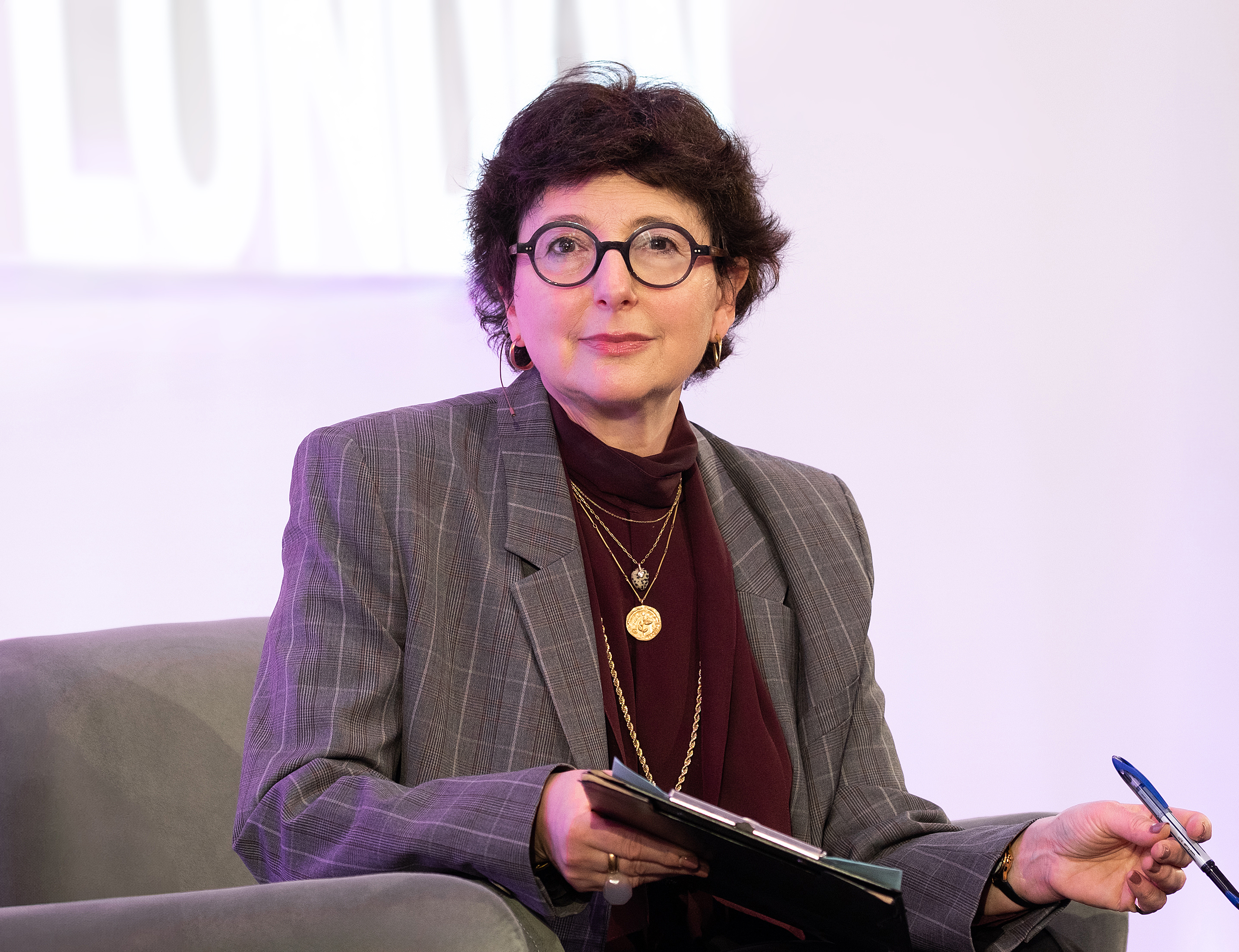
- Julia Hobsbawm at the 2025 SXSW London festival in London, UK
- Born: 15 August 1964 (age 62); London, England
- Occupations: businesswoman, writer and speaker on the future of work.
- Years active: 1985–present
- Parent(s): Eric Hobsbawm; Marlene Schwarz
- Website: www.juliahobsbawm.com

Julia Hobsbawm OBE (born 15 August 1964) is a British businesswoman, entrepreneur, writer and broadcaster on the future of work.

== Early life and education ==
Born in 1964 in London, England, Julia Hobsbawm is the daughter of historian Eric Hobsbawm and music teacher Marlene Schwarz, both European emigres. She grew up in Hampstead, attending Camden School for Girls.

In the early 1980s, she studied French and Italian at the Polytechnic of Central London (now the University of Westminster), leaving without qualifications after failing to transfer to Media Studies.

== Career ==
Hobsbawm began her career in publishing, and worked as a researcher in television, including on Wogan, before moving to political fundraising ahead of the Labour Party 1992 General Election.

In 1993, Hobsbawm founded the public relations firm Hobsbawm Macaulay Communications with her friend Sarah Brown.

In 2005, Hobsbawm founded Editorial Intelligence, a knowledge networking business that pioneered diverse network thinking. The company launched several initiatives, including the ideas conference Names Not Numbers, The Comment Awards celebrating opinion journalism, and The Human and the Machine, a technology-focused conference and podcast series. Hobsbawm is a regular media commentator and broadcaster and speaks frequently to corporate audiences and policymakers on topics including the future of work, hybrid working, productivity, and navigating complexity with simplicity. She has appeared on programmes such as BBC Question Time, BBC Newsnight, and The Today Programme, and has delivered talks for organisations including Google, McKinsey & Company, the OECD, and the UK Civil Service. She began hosting The Nowhere Office podcast with Stefan Stern in March 2021.

From September 2022 to 2024, Hobsbawm wrote the "Working Assumptions" column for Bloomberg News' section on work, Work Shift, having formerly been an editor-at-large for wellbeing portal Thrive, and a columnist for Strategy+Business magazine.. She is currently a contributing columnist for Bloomberg and has conducted interviews for Bloomberg Media with figures such as Arianna Huffington and Professor Nicholas Bloom. Her commentary on work and society has also appeared in publications including the Financial Times and Fortune.

In 2024, Hobsbawm founded Workathon, a global network and think tank focused on work trends and workplace change. In April 2025, Workathon published its first annual study, The United State of Work, and announced the launch of the World Work Organisation, a new global body dedicated to redefining the future of work.

Hobsbawm is a member of the Advisory Board of The Fora Institute of Work. She has held Honorary Visiting Professorships at the University of the Arts, London, and more recently at Bayes Business School (formerly Cass Business School), including a roles as Honorary Visiting Professor of Networking in 2012 and Honorary Visiting Professor in Workplace Social Health until 2020.

She is a patron of the Facial Surgery Research Foundation and the Zoe Sarojini Trust, a charity educating girls in South Africa, and was a founding trustee in the UK of OurBrainBank.

== Recognition ==
Hobsbawm was appointed an OBE in the Queen's Birthday Honours list in 2015 for services to business.

== Books ==
- Working Assumptions: What We Thought We Knew About Work Before Covid and Generational AI - and What We Know Now (White Fox Publishing with Fully Connected, 2024)
- The Nowhere Office: Reinventing Work and the Workplace of the Future (Basic Books UK and Public Affairs, 2022)
- The Simplicity Principle: Six Steps Towards Clarity in a Complex World (Kogan Page, 2020)
- Fully Connected: Surviving and Thriving in an Age of Overload (Bloomsbury, 2017)
- The See-Saw: 100 Ideas for Work-Life Balance (Atlantic Books, 2009)
- Where the Truth Lies: Trust and Morality in the Business of PR, Journalism and Communications (Atlantic Books, 2006)
