= Women Philosophers in the Long Nineteenth Century =

2021 anthology book

Women Philosophers in the Long Nineteenth Century: The German Tradition
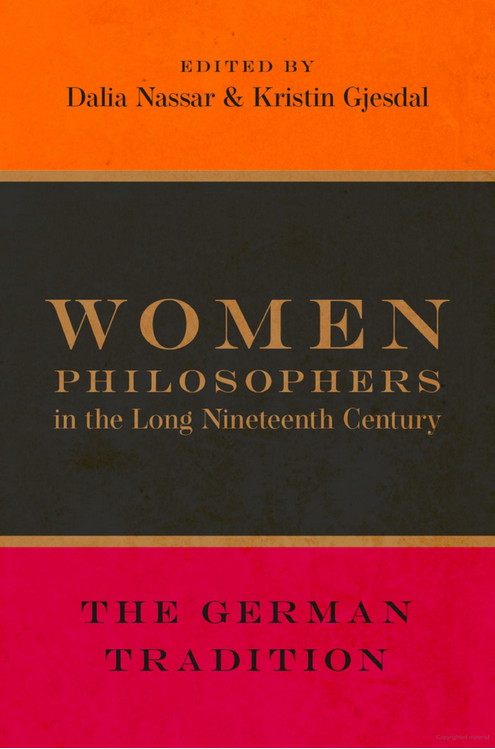
- Cover art for the first edition
- Editors: Dalia Nassar; Kristin Gjesdal
- Translator: Anna C. Ezekiel
- Subject: 19th-century German philosophy
- Publisher: Oxford University Press
- Publication date: 2021
- Publication place: United States
- Pages: 327
- ISBN: 978-0-19-086803-1
- Dewey Decimal: 193
- LC Class: B2743 .W66 2021
- Website: https://womenphilosophers.net at the Wayback Machine (archived July 27, 2023)

Women Philosophers in the Long Nineteenth Century: The German Tradition is a 2021 anthology book edited by philosophers Dalia Nassar and Kristin Gjesdal, with translations by Anna C. Ezekiel. The book includes the works of nine women of the German tradition of philosophy during the long nineteenth century—a term referring to the 125-year period between the French Revolution in 1789 and the Great War in 1914. Each chapter introduces one philosopher and provides a selection of their works, including essays, letters, books, or speeches. Women Philosophers was the first published English translation of many of the works.

Nassar and Gjesdal first conceived of the work in reaction to the lack of 19th-century women philosophers within the philosophical canon, despite their popularity and influence during the time period. The book is aimed primarily as an introductory work and covers a broad variety of topics, including German Romanticism, Marxism, phenomenology, nihilism, and feminism.

Upon publication, Women Philosophers received generally positive reviews, with critics describing its aim of expanding the canon as important and effectively done. The book's selection of authors and works were praised as nuanced and well-rounded by some reviewers, though others critiqued its omission of non-traditional philosophical works and certain philosophers. Ezekiel's translations garnered praise as clear and readable.

== Background ==
After observing successes in the inclusion of women within the field of early modern philosophy, Kristin Gjesdal and Dalia Nassar (Note: At the time of the book's publication, Gjesdal was a professor at Temple University and Nassar was an associate professor at the University of Sydney.) wanted to challenge the inadequate representation of women in the field of nineteenth century philosophy. Both Gjesdal and Nassar's research interests lie within German and historical philosophy, and the two first met while Nassar was teaching at Villanova University in Philadelphia.

Gjesdal compared the book to efforts to include the works of Friedrich Nietzsche and Johann Gottfried Herder within the anglophone philosophical canon during the twentieth century. Despite the popularity and influence of many women philosophers at the time, Gjesdal noted that they had been forgotten or excluded from the philosophical canon as a result of their exclusion from tertiary education and publication. (Note: Salomé and Luxemburg both attended the University of Zurich, one of the few institutions that accepted female students during the 19th century. In addition, Staël, Günderrode, and Salomé all published anonymously or with male pseudonyms.)

The book consists of nine chapters, each dedicated to one female philosopher from the long nineteenth century, a term referring to the 125-year period beginning with the French Revolution in 1789 and ending with the outbreak of the Great War in 1914. Each chapter begins with an introduction which includes a short biography of the philosopher and discusses their place within the history of philosophy. The book uses the German tradition of philosophy to connect women philosophers from a wide range of philosophical backgrounds, including German Romanticism, Marxism, nihilism, and phenomenology. The book includes the works of German Karoline von Günderrode, Bettina Brentano von Arnim, Hedwig Dohm, Clara Zetkin, and Gerda Walther, as well as the German-Polish writers Rosa Luxemburg and Edith Stein, the Russian-born Lou Andreas-Salomé, and the French Germaine de Staël.

== Summary ==
The first chapter translates three book chapters written by Germaine de Staël. The chapters include "On Women Writers" from her 1800 book The Influence of Literature on Society and "Kant" and "On the Influence of the New Philosophy on the Sciences" from her 1813 book Germany. "On Women Writers" addresses the negative social sanctions placed on women writers and argues that the opposition to female intellectual self-realization demonstrates the gaps in the project of the Enlightenment. The chapters "Kant" and "On the Influence of the New Philosophy on the Sciences" are based on the work of German philosophers Immanuel Kant and Friedrich Heinrich Jacobi respectively. "Kant" discuss the limitations of knowledge and the interdependence of feeling with reason; "On the Influence of the New Philosophy on the Sciences" expands on the argument of Kant's Critique of Judgment, arguing for a view of nature as a unified whole, and responds to Jacobi's challenge to Kant's notion of the thing-in-itself.

The second chapter consists of Karoline von Günderrode's essay "Idea of the Earth" and two sets of notes: one on Johann Gottlieb Fichte's The Vocation of Humankind and the other on Friedrich Wilhelm Joseph Schelling's work on the philosophy of nature. Günderrode's notes on The Vocation of Humankind critique Fichte's conclusions, particularly his understanding of nature and conception of self-determination. Günderrode's notes on the philosophy of nature provide a critique of German idealism, arguing that the isolation of the mind and nature (of subject and object) would make knowledge of the world impossible. "Idea of the Earth" examines the notion of "earth" and argues that "the earth is an 'idea' that must be realized". The argument presented in "Idea of the Earth" builds off of Günderrode's notes on the philosophy of nature to argue that nature is in some sense a human agent.

The third chapter consists of selections from Bettina Brentano von Arnim's 1840 book Günderode, (Note: Originally translated by Margaret Fuller into English as Correspondence of Fräulein Günderode and Bettine von Arnim) a synthesized version of Arnim and Günderrode's correspondence. The book, published 34 years after Günderrode's suicide, includes their discussions of poetry, abstract philosophy, sensuality, history, and the nature of truth. In the selections, Bettine (Note: Arnim and Günderrode's names are changed to Bettine and Günderode in the book.) challenges Günderode's interest in abstract philosophy, arguing that philosophical abstraction fails to capture the poetic and sensual essence of life. Likewise, Günderode challenges Bettine's depreciation of historical knowledge with a lengthy rebuke describing the importance of historical knowledge for intellectual growth. The two also exchange thoughts on the possibility of providing a philosophical proof for truth, before concluding that the transformative power of truth is itself a proof of truth.

The fourth chapter consists of four essays from Hedwig Dohm: "Nietzsche and Women", "The New Mother", "The Old Woman", and "On the Agitators of Anti-feminism". In "Nietzsche and Women", Dohm examines Nietzsche's views on women and critiques his misogyny while employing his arguments to build a critique of biological essentialism. "The New Mother" calls for the transformation of mother–daughter relationships and argues that ideas attributing fixed, intrinsic qualities to women must be abandoned. In "The Old Woman", Dohm argues that women's liberation must necessarily include the emancipation of and provide a greater purpose for old women. "On the Agitators of Anti-feminism" argues for the legitimacy of the women's movement, drawing on historical evidence to demonstrate that women have been historically subjugated.

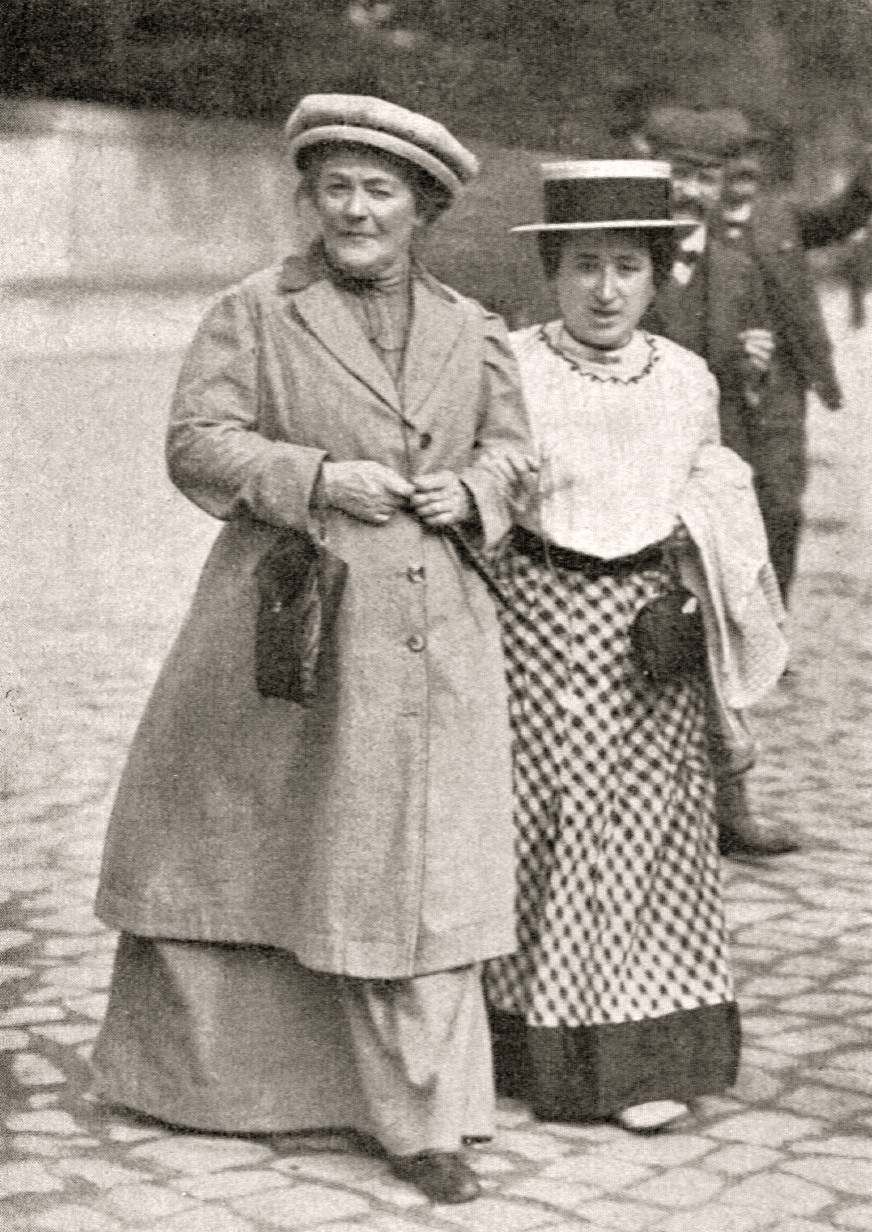
The book includes the works of Clara Zetkin (left) and Rosa Luxemburg who argued for the emancipation of workers.

The fifth chapter consists of three essays from Clara Zetkin: "For the Liberation of Women!" and "Women's Suffrage", which were first delivered as speeches, and "Save the Scottsboro Boys!" In "For the Liberation of Women!", Zetkin presents her vision of socialist feminism, arguing that the emancipation of women can only be intertwined with the emancipation of the worker. Zetkin's speech "Women's Suffrage" makes the argument for universal suffrage, as opposed to the partial suffrage advocated by some bourgeois feminists, arguing that suffrage based on the ownership of property did not aid the women's movement. Zetkin further argues in both speeches that the aim of the women's movement should be a struggle against capitalism, rather than a gender-based conflict. The short piece "Save the Scottsboro Boys!" calls on members of International Red Aid to respond to the decision to put the Scottsboro Boys, eight African American teenagers falsely accused of rape, on death row.

The sixth chapter consists of selections from Lou Salomé's 1910 book The Erotic, which explores the nature of the erotic and its interconnection with the corporeal and the mental. In the selection, Salomé draws a distinction between human eroticism and simple sexual or romantic desire, arguing that the possibility of love distinguishes human eroticism from other animals. Salomé argues that the tendency for philosophers to study the erotic by means of logic or to treat the erotic as a simple object results in a limited perspective lacking vitality or nuance. Countering these methods, Salomé attests that the erotic exists in relation between natural drives, the individual, and social life.

The seventh chapter consists of selections on wage labor from Rosa Luxemburg's Introduction to Political Economy (German: Einführung in die Nationalökonomie), her unfinished work conceived from her lectures on political economy. Luxemburg's discussion of wage labor was informed by contemporary debates on Marx's theory of labor power—the capacity to labor, sold as a commodity—which had been misconstrued as being equivalent to labor itself. In the selsection, Luxemburg analyses the relationship between wage labor and surplus value, the difference between the value produced and the cost of production.

The eighth chapter consists of excerpts from Edith Stein's doctoral thesis and first book, On the Problem of Empathy. Stein distinguishes between empathy, a feeling in another, from sympathy, a feeling with another. Arguing against the view of phenomenologists like Theodor Lipps who viewed empathy as the loss of oneself in another, she contends that empathy inherently involves feeling another's experience while preserving the distinction between self and other.

The ninth chapter consists of selections from Gerda Walther's dissertation, "A Contribution to the Ontology of Social Communities", which presents an analysis of the history and methods of phenomenology, its distinction from ontology, and draws an ontology of social communities. Walther argues that defining community simply by a shared goal or tradition, as Max Weber does, fails to distinguish between community and society. She instead argues that communities have an "inner connectedness" where each individual feels a subjective unity with other members of the group.

== Reception ==
Writing in the journal SATS, Martin Fog Arndal praised the book as unconcerned with nationalist narratives and described the selection of writers as nuanced and attentive. Aftenposten's Preben Jordal also commended the selection of philosophers as cohesive and expressed excitement at the book's potential to broaden the philosophical canon. Choice Reviews recommended the book for both undergraduates and faculty alike, describing it as "a much-needed contribution to literature on the history of philosophy". Writing in Symphilosophie, historian of philosophy Anne Pollok lauded the book as informative and comprehensive, stating that the book was "the perfect handbook to expand the canon" of 19th century philosophy. Pollok also stated that the book was already popular among researchers and instructors. British philosopher Alison Stone, writing in the Journal of the History of Philosophy, described the book's project and its focus on the German tradition as "particularly important", given the disproportionate influence of German philosophers during this time period. Fredrik Nilsen, writing in the journal Agora, praised the collection for raising awareness of philosophical figures that had traditionally been ignored, though he lamented that the book did not include the works of Hedwig Conrad-Martius or Anna Tumarkin.

Arndal and Pollok were both disappointed by the book's decision to exclude certain nonstandard philosophical genres like poetry, dramas, or letters, which were frequently employed by women philosophers as a result of their exclusion from publication. While Pollok sympathized with the book's aim to teach undergraduate students, she still lamented that these works were excluded, instantiating Nietzsche's Thus Spoke Zarathustra and The Gay Science as examples of commonly taught non-traditional philosophical works. Arndal praised the diversity of works in the volume, but was also disappointed that potential insights from poetry and novels had been lost.

=== Translation ===
With the exception of Staël, the works were translated by Anna C. Ezekiel with Women Philosophers serving as the first English translation for many of the works included in the book. Pollok described the book's readability as "superb", praising Ezekiel's prudent use of German-language phrases. Arndal also praised the translation as "highly readable and fluent". A Norwegian translation of the anthology was published in April 2022 by Cappelen Damm. Jordal described the Norwegian translation as "excellent".
