= Long eighteenth century =

Period in British history from 1688 to 1815

- 1688–1815
17th century	Long nineteenth century
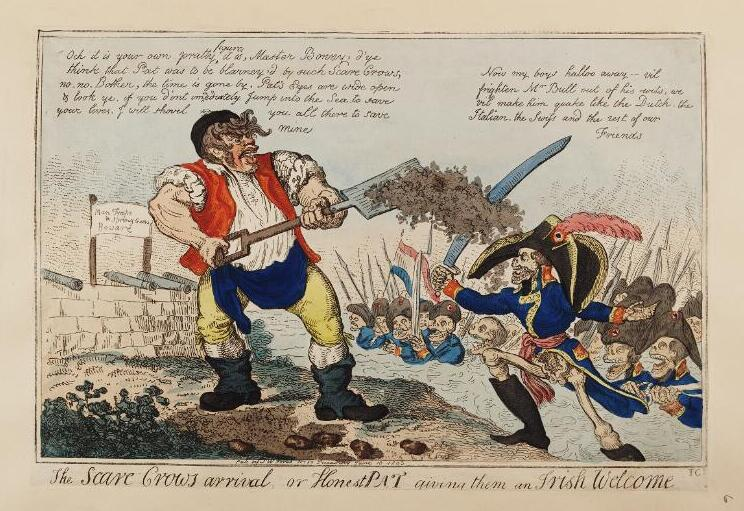
- Satirical cartoon titled The scare crows arrival, or- honest Pat giving them an Irish welcome, 1803
- Location: Western Europe
- Key events: Glorious Revolution; War of the Two Kings; Seven Ill Years; Nine Years' War; Act of Union 1707; French colonization of the Americas; English colonization of the Americas; French Revolution; British Agricultural Revolution; Jacobite risings Welsh Methodist revival Irish Rebellion of 1798; American Revolution; Act of Union 1800; Napoleonic Wars; Atlantic slave trade and its abolition War of the Spanish Succession; War of the Austrian Succession; Seven Years' War

The long 18th century is a phrase used by many British historians to cover a more natural historical period than the simple use of the standard calendar definition of the eighteenth century (1 January 1701 [ New Style ] to 31 December 1800). They expand the century to include larger British and Western European historical movements, with their subsequent "long" 18th century typically running from the Glorious Revolution and the beginning of the Nine Years' War in 1688 to the end of the Napoleonic Wars in 1815. Other definitions, perhaps those with a more social or global interest, extend the period further to, for example, from the Stuart Restoration in 1660 to the end of the Georgian era. Possibly the earliest proponent of the long eighteenth century was Sir John Robert Seeley, who in 1883 defined the eighteenth century as "the period which begins with the Revolution of 1688 and ends with the peace of 1815".

The Institute of Historical Research hosts a seminar series on "British History in the Long 18th Century".

== See also ==
- Long 19th century
- Second Hundred Years' War
- Short 20th century
