= Echoes of the Marseillaise =

1990 book by Eric Hobsbawm

- First edition
- Author: Eric Hobsbawm
- Cover artist: Jean-Baptiste Regnault
- Language: English
- Publisher: Verso Books
- Publication date: 1990

Echoes of the Marseillaise: Two Centuries Look Back on the French Revolution is a book by Eric Hobsbawm first published in 1990 by Verso Books. It was written just after the bicentenary of the French Revolution in 1989 which was accompanied by a large outpouring of new scholarship. The recent anti-communist revolutions of 1989 further polarised commentators between those who saw them as a culmination or embodiment of French revolutionary ideas and those who saw it as their emphatic repudiation.

Hobsbawm analyses the Revolution primarily from the perspective of how it has been subsequently interpreted over the course of the two centuries since it occurred, and examines the way that it has been re-written based on contemporary ideologies. In particular, Hobsbawm writes polemically in opposition to what he sees as the dominant trajectory in writing about the Revolution during his era: that of a revisionism which downplayed the successes of the Revolution and stressed instead its violence, rapacity and destructiveness. He argues, for instance, that the bicentenary was "largely dominated by those who, to put it simply, do not like the French Revolution and its heritage".

Hobsbawm's view is that for many in the nineteenth century, the Revolution was seen as a bourgeois precursor of potential future proletarian revolutions. He argues further that many Marxists, chiefly from 1917 to the 1960s used it as an example of a much longer-term reading of political change but that in the 1970s and 1980s (after the first major work of revisionism by Alfred Cobban written in the Cold War milieu of the 1950s) many historians began to argue that the Revolution achieved only limited results which were outweighed by extravagant costs. In his eyes, this shift of interpretation was a false one, and his work concludes that the Revolution was a crucial event not only for what it achieved in itself, but in terms of its longer-term patrimony to history. He concludes that "Liberty, equality and fraternity, and the values of Reason and the Enlightenment - the values on which modern civilisation has been built, since the American Revolution - are more needed than ever" and, finally, that the Revolution improved the world, and did so on a permanent basis.

== See also ==
- Citizens: A Chronicle of the French Revolution (1989)
