= Long nineteenth century =

Historical period (1789 to 1914)

- 1789–1914
Age of Enlightenment; Long eighteenth century	World War I Short 20th century
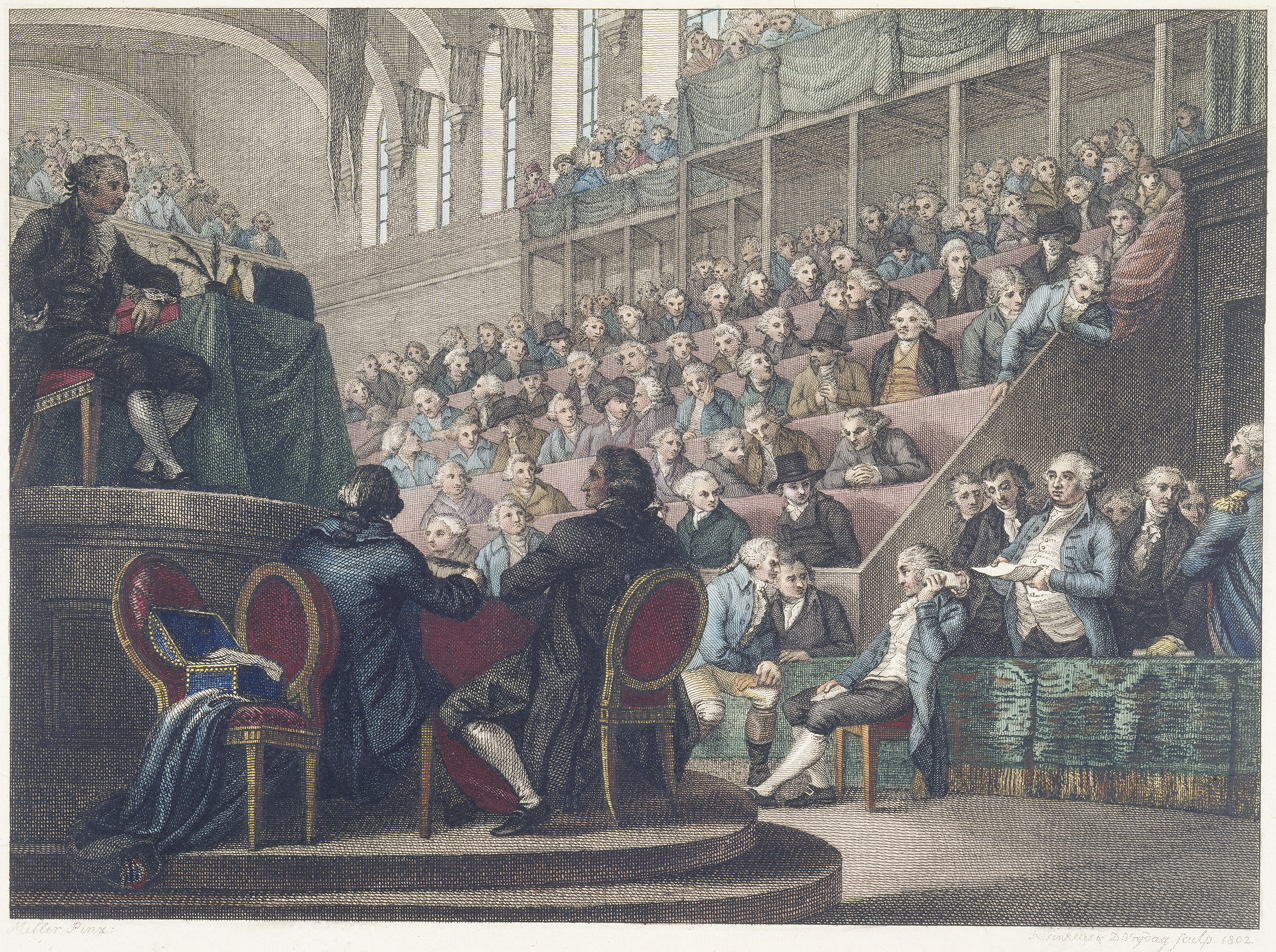
- Trial of Louis XVI before the National Convention in December 1792. The former king is standing at right, wearing blue.
- Key events: Dual revolution French Revolutionary Wars; Haitian Revolution; Napoleonic Wars; Congress of Vienna; Industrial Revolution; Scramble for Africa; Market Revolution; Revolutions of 1848; 1911 Revolution; Globalisation; Human population growth Spanish American wars of independence Meiji Restoration; Abolition of slavery in much of the world; end of the Atlantic slave trade

The long nineteenth century is a term for the 125-year period beginning with the onset of the French Revolution in 1789 and ending with the outbreak of World War I in 1914. It was coined by the Soviet writer Ilya Ehrenburg, and later popularized by the British historian Eric Hobsbawm. The concept is an adaptation of Fernand Braudel's 1949 notion of le long seizième siècle (transl. the long 16th century, 1450–1640, which represented proto-globalization with the birth of the world market), and is "a recognized category of literary history", although a period often broadly and diversely defined by different scholars.

Numerous authors, before and after Hobsbawm's 1995 publication, have applied similar forms of book titles or descriptions to indicate a selective time frame for their works, such as S. Kettering's French Society: 1589–1715 – the Long Seventeenth Century, E. Anthony Wrigley's British Population During the 'Long' Eighteenth Century, 1680–1840, or David Blackbourn's The Long Nineteenth Century: A History of Germany, 1780–1918. The term has been used in support of historical publications to "connect with broader audiences", and is regularly cited in studies and discussions across academic disciplines, such as history, linguistics, and the arts.

== Overview ==
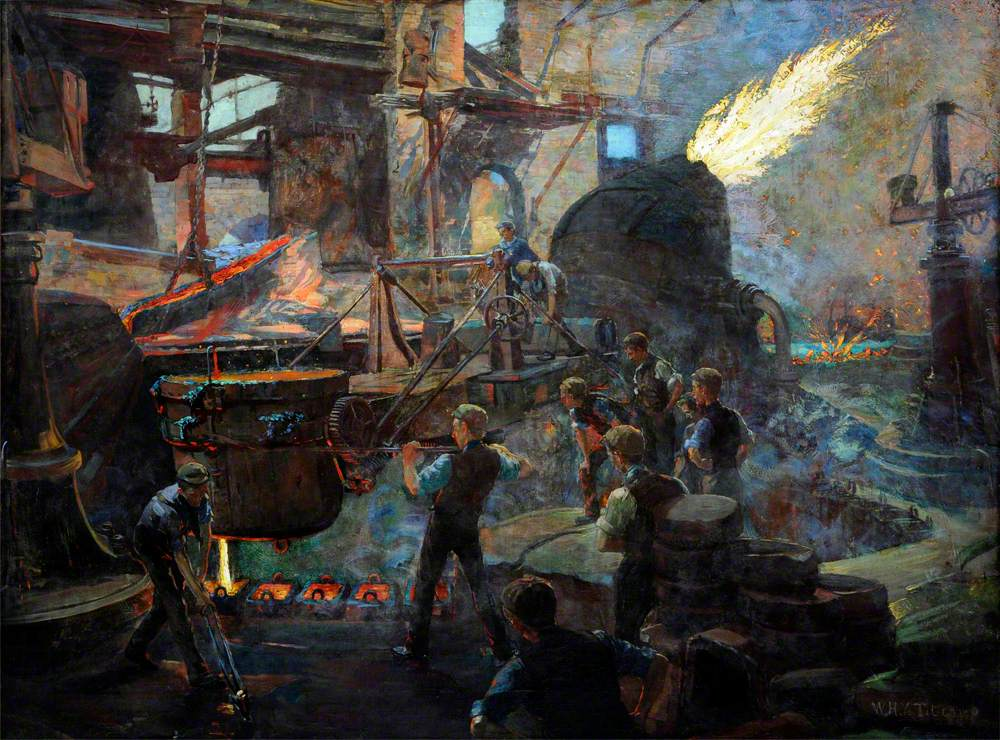
The Wealth of England, the Bessemer Process of Making Steel (William Holt Yates Titcomb, 1895)

Hobsbawm lays out his analysis in The Age of Revolution: Europe 1789–1848 (1962), The Age of Capital: 1848–1875 (1975), and The Age of Empire: 1875–1914 (1987). Hobsbawm starts his long 19th century with his dual revolution: the Industrial Revolution, which brought about vast technological advancement and societal change; and the French Revolution, which sought to establish universal and egalitarian citizenship in France. He ends it with the outbreak of World War I, which concluded in 1918 with the long-enduring European power balance of the 19th century proper (1801–1900) realigned. In a sequel to this trilogy, The Age of Extremes: The Short Twentieth Century, 1914–1991 (1994), Hobsbawm details the "short 20th century" (a concept originally proposed by Iván T. Berend), beginning with World War I and ending with the dissolution of the Soviet Union, between 1914 and 1991. A more generalized version of the long 19th century, lasting from 1750 to 1914, is often used by Peter Stearns in the context of the world history school.

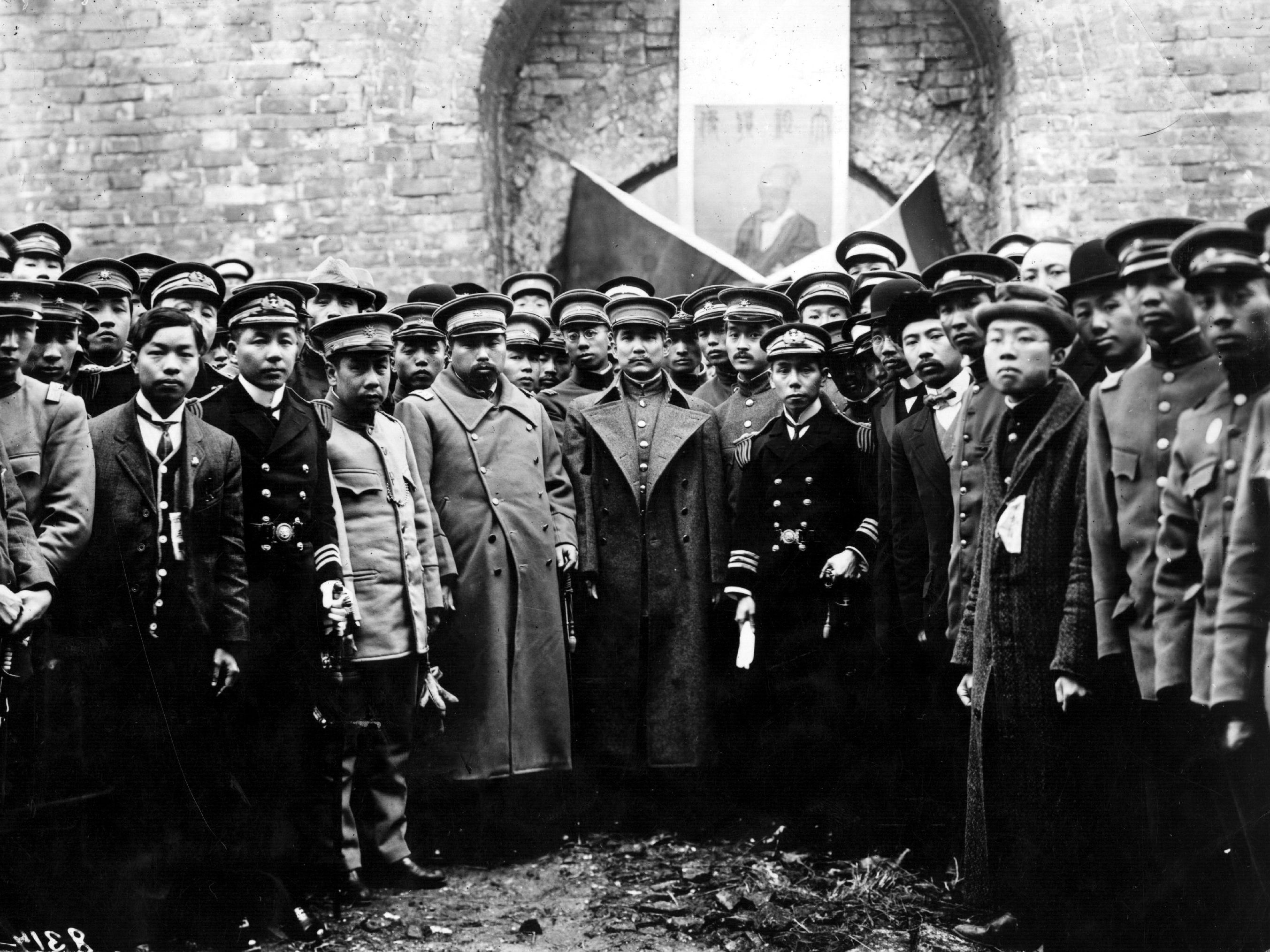
Sun Yat-sen announcing the Chinese Republic at the Xiao Mausoleum, 1912

In religious contexts, specifically those concerning the history of the Catholic Church, the long 19th century was a period of centralization of papal power over the Catholic Church. This centralization was in opposition to the increasingly centralized nation states and contemporary revolutionary movements, and used many of the same organizational and communication techniques as its rivals. The Church's long 19th century, covering the period between the decline of traditional Catholic power and the emergence of secular ideas within states and the emergence of new thinking within the church after the election of Pope John XXIII, extended from the French Revolution (1789) until the death of Pope Pius XII (1958).

== See also ==
- Europe in the long 19th century
- Belle Époque
- Belgium in the long nineteenth century
- France in the long nineteenth century
- Long eighteenth century
- Long War (20th century), proposed by Philip Bobbitt
- Women Philosophers in the Long Nineteenth Century
