= The Age of Empire: 1875–1914 =

1987 book by Eric Hobsbawm

- Author: Eric Hobsbawm
- Cover artist: Reinhold Thiele (photographer)
- Subject: History
- Publisher: Weidenfeld & Nicolson
- Publication date: 1987
- Publication place: United Kingdom
- Pages: 404
- ISBN: 978-0-394-56319-0
- Preceded by: The Age of Capital: 1848–1875
- Followed by: The Age of Extremes: The Short Twentieth Century, 1914–1991

The Age of Empire: 1875–1914 is a book by the British historian Eric Hobsbawm, published in 1987. It is the third in a trilogy of books about "the long 19th century" (coined by Hobsbawm), preceded by The Age of Revolution: Europe 1789–1848 and The Age of Capital: 1848–1875. A fourth book, The Age of Extremes: The Short Twentieth Century, 1914–1991, acts as a sequel to the trilogy.

== Themes ==
The period of less than fifty years described by Hobsbawm began with an economic depression (see Long Depression), but the capitalist world economy quickly recovered, although the dominant British economy was being undermined by the German economy and American economy. Rising productivity resulted in increasing flow of goods, and rising living standards. Despite that, inequality was growing, both on the national and international levels. In the cultural sphere, it was the period of the Belle Époque, the swan-song of aristocracy, increasingly marginalized by the growing affluence of the upper middle class (bourgeois), which can be seen as the class most benefiting from changes of that period.

As part of the Belle Époque it was also a period of peace, with Europe and the Western world involved in only a few minor conflicts. This led to a popular belief that no significant wars would happen in the future, an era of widespread optimism. At the same time, the military-industrial complex in all countries were busily stocking supplies for the conflict to come. In the background, the belief in progress and science was clashing with the old forces of religion. The West, dominating the world through its colonial system, was also increasingly interested in foreign cultures. It was such internal contradictions and tensions that for Hobsbawm defined this era, and spelled its inevitable end.

The ending of the Hobsbawn trilogy sees the end of the era that began with the dual revolution (the French Revolution and the Industrial Revolution). Inspired by Vladimir Lenin, Hobsbawm, a writer widely recognized as a Marxist, traces the development of capitalism, linking it with the development of imperialism that resulted in the First World War. Unlike Lenin, who predicted that this will lead to capitalism's downfall, and with the benefit of almost a century more of a hindsight, Hobsbawm acknowledges that capitalism survived, although in a form different from that which it began with in the late 18th century. Facing the dangers of a competing ideology, that of communism, and another revolution (the Russian Revolution), capitalism, according to Hobsbawm, survived by appeasing the masses and accepting some socialist demands, such as that of the welfare state.

== Contents ==
- Overture
1. The Centenarian Revolution
2. An Economy Changes Gear
3. The Age of Empire
4. The Politics of Democracy
5. Workers of the World
6. Waving Flags: Nations and Nationalism
7. Who's Who or the Uncertainties of the Bourgeoisie
8. The New Woman
9. The Arts Transformed
10. Certainties Undermined: The Sciences
11. Reason and Society
12. Towards Revolution
13. From Peace to War
14. New Capitalism
- Epilogue

== See also ==
- World-systems theory
