= Bandits (book) =

1969 book by Eric Hobsbawm

- Cover photo is of Pancho Villa wearing bandoliers
- Author: Eric Hobsbawm
- Language: English
- Subject: History, Criminology, Social banditry
- Genre: Nonfiction
- Publisher: Weidenfeld & Nicolson, Pantheon Books
- Publication date: 1969, 1981
- Publication place: United Kingdom, United States
- Pages: 185

Bandits is a book by Eric Hobsbawm, first published in 1969 by Weidenfeld & Nicolson and re-issued in revised and expanded form in 1981 by Pantheon Books. It focuses on the concept of bandits within the mythology, folklore, and literature of Europe, specifically its relation to classical Marxist concepts of class struggle.

== Summary ==
Eric Hobsbawm sets out to explore and analyze the history of banditry and organized crime and its relationship to class structures of agrarian societies. Hobsbawm specifies a specific form of crime that fit into the category of social bandit, which represented groups of young men, landless peasants, free-men, and military deserters. Social bandits are distinguished from other forms of organized crime in how the majority peasantry perceived the bandits as rebels who opposed the unjust system of feudalism. Among social bandits there are three main historical categories: that of "The Noble Robbers", "The Avengers", and the "haiduks". The Noble Robbers are the romanticized concept of noble criminals who fight injustice and have a large popularity with the lower classes; key figures include Robin Hood, Diego Corrientes Mateos and Juro Janosik. The Avengers are bandits whose acts of cruelty and violence distinguish them as people both feared and respected by common people. Often they had very few redeeming qualities yet commanded respect because of their brutality.
