= Eric Hobsbawm =

British academic historian and Marxist historiographer (1917–2012)

Eric Hobsbawm CH FRSL FBA
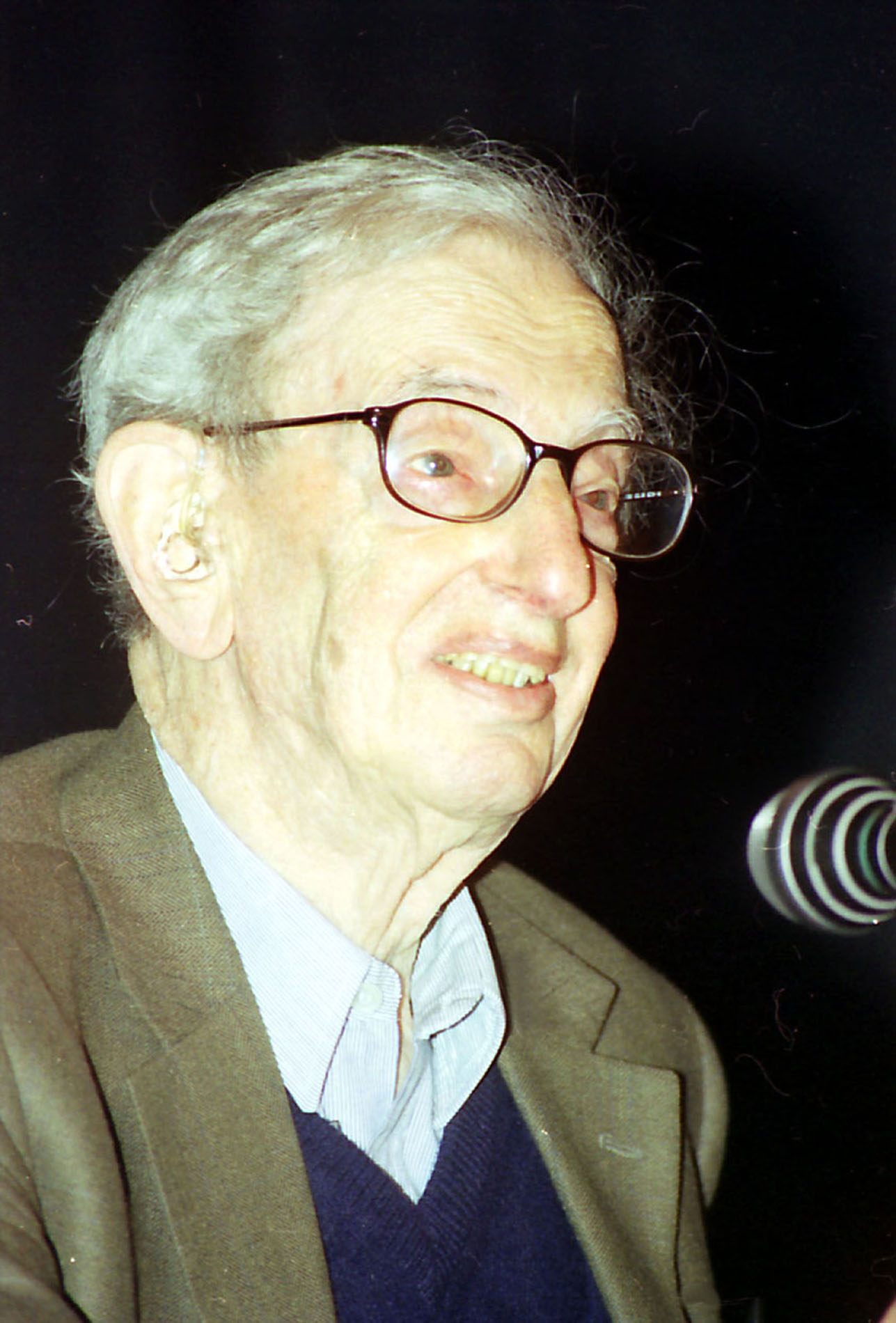
- Hobsbawm in 2004
- Born: Eric John Ernest Hobsbawm; 9 June 1917; Alexandria, Sultanate of Egypt
- Died: 1 October 2012 (aged 95); London, England
- Occupation: Historian
- Spouses: Muriel Seaman (m. 1943; div. 1951); Marlene Schwarz (m. 1962)
- Children: 3, including Julia and Andy

Academic background
- Education: King's College, Cambridge
- Doctoral advisor: M. M. Postan

Academic work
- Discipline: History
- Sub-discipline: Social history; Labour history; World history
- Institutions: Birkbeck, University of London; King's College, Cambridge; Stanford University; The New School
- Notable students: Ernesto Laclau
- World War II
- Allegiance: United Kingdom
- Branch: British Army
- Corps: RE; RAEC

Eric John Ernest Hobsbawm (/ˈhɒbz.bɔːm/; 9 June 1917 – 1 October 2012) was a British historian of the rise of industrial capitalism, socialism and nationalism. His best-known works include his tetralogy about what he called the "long 19th century" (The Age of Revolution: Europe 1789–1848, The Age of Capital: 1848–1875 and The Age of Empire: 1875–1914) and the "short 20th century" (The Age of Extremes), and an edited volume that introduced the influential idea of "invented traditions". He was a life-long Marxist, and his socio-political convictions influenced the character of his work.

Hobsbawm was born in Alexandria, Egypt, and spent his childhood mainly in Vienna and Berlin. Following the death of his parents and the rise to power of Adolf Hitler, Hobsbawm moved to London with his adoptive family. After serving in the Second World War, he obtained his PhD in history at the University of Cambridge. In 1998, he was appointed to the Order of the Companions of Honour. He was president of Birkbeck, University of London, from 2002 until his death. In 2003, he received the Balzan Prize for European History since 1900, "for his brilliant analysis of the troubled history of 20th century Europe and for his ability to combine in-depth historical research with great literary talent."

== Early life and education ==
Eric Hobsbawm was born in 1917 in Alexandria, Egypt. His father was Leopold Percy Hobsbaum (né Obstbaum), a Jewish merchant from the East End of London of Polish Jewish descent. His mother was Nelly Hobsbaum (née Grün), who was from a middle-class Austrian Jewish family. Although both of his parents were Jewish, neither was observant. His early childhood was spent in Vienna, Austria, and Berlin, Germany. A clerical error at birth altered his surname from Hobsbaum to Hobsbawm. Although the family lived in German-speaking countries, he grew up speaking English as his first language.

In 1929, when Hobsbawm was 12, his father died, and he started contributing to his family's support by working as an au pair and English tutor. Upon the death of their mother in 1931, he and his sister Nancy were adopted by their maternal aunt, Gretl, and paternal uncle, Sidney, who married and had a son named Peter. Hobsbawm was a student at the Prinz Heinrich-Gymnasium Berlin (today Friedrich-List-School) when the Nazi Party came to power in 1933. That year the family moved to London, where Hobsbawm enrolled in St Marylebone Grammar School. He didn't consider himself a refugee, given that he was British by birth because of his father's nationality.

Hobsbawm attended King's College, Cambridge, from 1936, where he joined the Communist Party of Great Britain "in the form of the university's Socialist Club." He took a double-starred first in history and was elected to the Cambridge Apostles. He received a doctorate (PhD) in history from the University of Cambridge for his dissertation on the Fabian Society. During the Second World War, he served in the Royal Engineers and the Army Educational Corps. He was prevented from serving overseas after he attracted the attention of the security services by using the wall newspaper he edited during his army training to argue for the opening up of a Second Front, which was a demand made by the Communist Party of Great Britain at the time. He applied to return to Cambridge as a research student, and was released from the military in 1946.

== Academia ==
MI5 opened a personal file on Hobsbawm in 1942 and their monitoring of his activities was to affect the progress of his career for many years. In 1945, he applied to the BBC for a full-time post making educational broadcasts to help servicemen adjust to civilian life after a long period in the forces and was considered "a most suitable candidate". The appointment was swiftly vetoed by MI5 who believed Hobsbawm was unlikely "to lose any opportunity he may get to disseminate propaganda and obtain recruits for the Communist party". In 1947, he became a lecturer in history at Birkbeck College, University of London which, unusually at the time, lacked any inclination towards anti-communism among staff or students. He became reader in 1959, professor between 1970 and 1982 and an emeritus professor of history in 1982. He was a Fellow of King's College, Cambridge, from 1949 to 1955. Hobsbawm said there was a weaker version of McCarthyism that took hold in Britain and affected Marxist academics: "you didn't get promotion for 10 years, but nobody threw you out". According to Noel Annan in his Our Age, Hobsbawm was denied a lectureship at Cambridge by political enemies, and blocked for a time from a professorship at Birkbeck for the same reasons. Hobsbawm spoke of his good fortune at having got a post at Birkbeck in 1948 before the Cold War really started to take off. Conservative commentator David Pryce-Jones has questioned the existence of such career obstacles.

Hobsbawm helped found the academic journal Past & Present in 1952. He was a visiting professor at Stanford University in the 1960s. In 1970s, he was appointed professor and in 1976 he became a Fellow of the British Academy. He was elected a Foreign Honorary Member of the American Academy of Arts and Sciences in 1971 and a Fellow of the Royal Society of Literature in 2006.

Hobsbawm formally retired from Birkbeck in 1982, becoming Emeritus Professor of History, and was appointed as president of Birkbeck in 2002. He remained as visiting professor at The New School for Social Research in Manhattan between 1984 and 1997. He was, until his death, professor emeritus in the New School for Social Research in the Political Science Department. A polyglot, he spoke English, German, French, Spanish, and Italian fluently, and read Dutch, Portuguese, and Catalan.

== Works ==
Hobsbawm wrote extensively on many subjects as one of Britain's most prominent historians. As a Marxist historiographer he focused on analysis of the "dual revolution" (the political French Revolution and the British Industrial Revolution). He saw their effect as a driving force behind the predominant trend towards liberal capitalism today. Another recurring theme in his work was social banditry, which Hobsbawm placed in a social and historical context, thus countering the traditional view of it being a spontaneous and unpredictable form of primitive rebellion. He coined the term "long nineteenth century", which begins with the French Revolution in 1789 and ends with the start of World War I in 1914.

He published numerous essays in various intellectual journals, dealing with subjects such as barbarity in the modern age, the troubles of labour movements, and the conflict between anarchism and communism. Among his final publications were Globalisation, Democracy and Terrorism (2007), On Empire (2008) and the collection of essays How to Change the World: Marx and Marxism 1840–2011 (2011).

Outside his academic historical writing, Hobsbawm wrote a regular column about jazz for the New Statesman (under the pseudonym Francis Newton, taken from the name of Billie Holiday's communist trumpet player, Frankie Newton). He had become interested in jazz during the 1930s when it was frowned upon by the Communist Party. Hobsbawm occasionally wrote about other forms of popular music, such as in his 1963 article "Beatles and before", in which he predicts that the Beatles "are probably just about to begin their slow descent" and that "[i]n 29 years' time nothing of them will survive".

== Politics ==
Hobsbawm joined the Sozialistischer Schülerbund (Association of Socialist Pupils), an offshoot of the Young Communist League of Germany, in Berlin in 1931, and the Communist Party of Great Britain (CPGB) in 1936. He was a member of the Communist Party Historians Group from 1946 until its demise and subsequently president of its successor, the Socialist History Society, until his death. The Soviet invasion of Hungary in 1956 led thousands of its members to leave the British Communist Party – but Hobsbawm, unique among his colleagues, remained in the party but was mistrusted by its leadership and ceased political work by the end of the 1950s. Hobsbawm maintained some ties to former colleagues such as E. P. Thompson and John Saville, who had left the CPGB at this time and became leading lights of the New Left in Britain, occasionally contributing to New Left publications but also providing intelligence reports on the dissidents to CPGB headquarters. He later described the New Left as "a half-remembered footnote". He signed a historians' letter of protest against the Soviet invasion of Hungary and was firmly in favour of the Prague Spring.

Hobsbawm was a leading light of the Eurocommunist faction in the Communist Party of Great Britain (CPGB) that began to gather strength after 1968, when the CPGB criticised the Soviet crushing of the Prague Spring and the French Communist Party's failure to support the May 68 movement in Paris. In "The Forward March of Labour Halted?" (originally a Marx Memorial Lecture, "The British Working Class One Hundred Years after Marx", that was delivered to a small audience of fellow Marxists in March 1978 before being published in Marxism Today in September 1978), he argued that the working class was inevitably losing its central role in society, and that left-wing parties could no longer appeal only to this class; a controversial viewpoint in a period of trade union militancy. Hobsbawm supported Neil Kinnock's transformation of the British Labour Party from 1983 (the party received 28 per cent of the vote in that year's elections, 2 per cent more than the Social Democratic Party/Liberal Alliance), and, though not close to Kinnock, came to be referred to as "Neil Kinnock's Favourite Marxist". His interventions in Kinnock's remaking of the Labour Party helped prepare the ground for the Third Way, New Labour, and Tony Blair, whom Hobsbawm later derisively referred to as "Thatcher in trousers". Until the cessation of publication in 1991, he contributed to the magazine Marxism Today. A third of the 30 reprints of Marxism Today's feature articles that appeared in The Guardian during the 1980s were articles or interviews by or with Hobsbawm, making him their most popular contributor.

In addition to his association with the CPGB, Hobsbawm developed close ties to the largest Communist Party in the western world, the Italian Communist Party (PCI), of which he declared himself a "spiritual member". He developed contacts with Italian left-wing academics and intellectuals in the early 1950s, which led to him encountering the work of Antonio Gramsci, whose writings were a key influence on Hobsbawm's work on the history of subaltern groups, emphasising their agency as well as structural factors. Hobsbawm spoke favourably about PCI general secretary Enrico Berlinguer's strategy of Historic Compromise in the 1970s, seeking rapprochement with the Catholic Church and the Christian Democrats, providing passive support to the latter in government in order to bring the Communists into the political mainstream by accepting Italy's position as a member of NATO, thus being able to build broader alliances and convince wider sections of society of its legitimacy as a potential governing force.

From the 1960s, his politics took a more moderate turn, as Hobsbawm came to recognise that his hopes were unlikely to be realised, and no longer advocated "socialist systems of the Soviet type". Until the day of his death, however, he remained firmly entrenched on the Left, maintaining that the long-term outlooks for humanity were 'bleak'. "I think we ought to get out of that 20th-century habit of thinking of systems as mutually exclusive: you're either socialist or you're capitalist, or whatever", Hobsbawm stated in 2009 in regard to the emergence of a new historical system. "There are plenty of people who still think so. I think very few attempts have been made to build a system on the total assumption of social ownership and social management. At its peak the Soviet system tried it. And in the past 20 or 30 years, the capitalist system has also tried it. In both cases, the results demonstrate that it won't work. So it seems to me the problem isn't whether this market system disappears, but exactly what the nature of the mixture between market economy and public economy is and, above all, in my view, what the social objectives of that economy are. One of the worst things about the politics of the past 30 years is that the rich have forgotten to be afraid of the poor – of most of the people in the world."

=== Communism and Russia ===
Hobsbawm stressed that since communism was not created, the sacrifices were in fact not justified—a point he emphasised in Age of Extremes. He argued that regardless of the estimate of direct and indirect victims, none of the proposed numbers could be justified. He added that the population of the USSR in 1937, 164 million, was "16.7 million less than the demographic forecasts of the Second Five-Year Plan (1933–38)."

In his autobiography, Interesting Times, he denied trying to downplay the atrocities in Russia, though he said he did not know how bad the massacres were. Early on, he knew of struggles such as revolution, civil war, famine (particularly "the Volga famine of the early '20s, if not the early '30s"), and because of the west breaking down, they felt this experimental system would work better, a belief he later considered an illusion.

With regard to the 1930s, he argued that it was impossible to understand leftists who did not condemn or acknowledge Soviet atrocities, without a sense that communism and liberalism were fighting for the same cause against fascism. He also noted that Stalin was a problem for the Russians, whereas Hitler was a problem for everyone.

He claimed that the demise of the USSR was "traumatic not only for communists but for socialists everywhere".

=== Other views ===
Regarding Queen Elizabeth II, Hobsbawm stated that constitutional monarchy in general has "proved a reliable framework for liberal-democratic regimes" and "is likely to remain useful". On the nuclear attacks on Japan in World War II, he adhered to the view that "there was even less sign of a crack in Japan's determination to fight to the end [compared with that of Nazi Germany], which is why nuclear arms were dropped on Hiroshima and Nagasaki to ensure a rapid Japanese surrender". He believed there was an ancillary political, non-military reason for the bombings: "perhaps the thought that it would prevent America's ally the USSR from establishing a claim to a major part in Japan's defeat was not absent from the minds of the US government either." Hobsbawm is quoted as saying that, next to sex, there is nothing so physically intense as 'participation in a mass demonstration at a time of great public exaltation'.

== Reception ==
In 1994, Neal Ascherson said of Hobsbawm: "No historian now writing in English can match his overwhelming command of fact and source. But the key word is 'command'. Hobsbawm's capacity to store and retrieve detail has now reached a scale normally approached only by large archives with big staffs". In 2002, Hobsbawm was described by right-leaning magazine The Spectator as "arguably our greatest living historian—not only Britain's, but the world's", while Niall Ferguson wrote: "That Hobsbawm is one of the great historians of his generation is undeniable ... His quartet of books beginning with The Age of Revolution and ending with The Age of Extremes constitute the best starting point I know for anyone who wishes to begin studying modern history. Nothing else produced by the British Marxist historians will endure as these books will." In 2003, The New York Times described him as "one of the great British historians of his age, an unapologetic Communist and a polymath whose erudite, elegantly written histories are still widely read in schools here and abroad". James Joll wrote in The New York Review of Books that "Eric Hobsbawm's nineteenth century trilogy is one of the great achievements of historical writing in recent decades". Mark Mazower wrote of his historical writings being "about trends, social forces, large-scale change over vast distances. Telling that kind of history in a way that is as compelling as a detective story is a real challenge of style and composition: in the tetralogy, Hobsbawm shows how to do it." Ian Kershaw said that Hobsbawm's take on the twentieth century, his 1994 book, The Age of Extremes, consisted of "masterly analysis". Meanwhile, Tony Judt, while praising Hobsbawm's vast knowledge and graceful prose, cautioned that Hobsbawm's bias in favour of the USSR, communist states and communism in general, and his tendency to disparage any nationalist movement as passing and irrational, weakened his grasp of parts of the 20th century.

With regard to the impact of his Marxist outlook and sympathies on his scholarship, Ben Pimlott saw it as "a tool not a straitjacket; he's not dialectical or following a party line", although Judt argued that it has "prevented his achieving the analytical distance he does on the 19th century: he isn't as interesting on the Russian revolution because he can't free himself completely from the optimistic vision of earlier years. For the same reason, he's not that good on fascism". In a 2011 poll by History Today magazine, he was named the third most important historian of the previous 60 years.

After reading Age of Extremes, Kremlinologist Robert Conquest concluded that Hobsbawm suffers from a "massive reality denial" regarding the USSR, and John Gray, though praising his work on the nineteenth century, has described Hobsbawm's writings on the post-1914 period as "banal in the extreme. They are also highly evasive. A vast silence surrounds the realities of communism, a refusal to engage which led the late Tony Judt to conclude that Hobsbawm had 'provincialised himself'. It is a damning judgement".

In a 1994 interview on BBC television with Canadian academic Michael Ignatieff, Hobsbawm said that the deaths of millions of Soviet citizens under Stalin would have been worth it if a genuinely communist society had been the result. Hobsbawm argued that, "In a period in which, as you might imagine, mass murder and mass suffering are absolutely universal, the chance of a new world being born in great suffering would still have been worth backing" but, unfortunately, "the Soviet Union was not the beginning of the World Revolution". The following year, when asked the same question on BBC Radio 4's Desert Island Discs, if "the sacrifice of millions of lives" would have been worth the future communist society, he replied: "That's what we felt when we fought the Second World War". He repeated what he had already said to Ignatieff, when he asked the rhetorical question, "Do people now say we shouldn't have had World War II, because more people died in World War II than died in Stalin's terror?".

Tony Judt was of the opinion that Hobsbawm "clings to a pernicious illusion of the late Enlightenment: that if one can promise a benevolent outcome it would be worth the human cost. But one of the great lessons of the 20th century is that it's not true. For such a clear-headed writer, he appears blind to the sheer scale of the price paid. I find it tragic, rather than disgraceful." Neil Ascherson believes that, "Eric is not a man for apologising or feeling guilty. He does feel bad about the appalling waste of lives in Soviet communism. But he refuses to acknowledge that he regrets anything. He's not that kind of person." Hobsbawm himself, in his autobiography, wrote that he desires "historical understanding ... not agreement, approval or sympathy".

The 1930s aside, Hobsbawm was criticised for never relinquishing his Communist Party membership. Whereas people like Arthur Koestler left the Party after seeing the friendly reception of Nazi foreign minister Joachim von Ribbentrop in Moscow during the years of the Molotov–Ribbentrop Pact (1939–1941), Hobsbawm stood firm even after the Soviet interventions of the Hungarian Revolution of 1956 and the Prague Spring. Hobsbawm let his membership lapse not long before the party's dissolution in 1991. In his memoirs, Hobsbawm wrote: "The dream of the October Revolution is still there somewhere inside me ... I have abandoned, nay, rejected it, but it has not been obliterated. To this day, I notice myself treating the memory and tradition of the USSR with an indulgence and tenderness."

== Personal life ==
One of Hobsbawm's friends, historian Donald Sassoon, wrote: "Hobsbawm was not a Jewish historian; he was an historian who happened to be Jewish". His first marriage was to Muriel Seaman in 1943. They divorced in 1951. His second marriage was to Marlene Schwarz (in 1962), with whom he had two children, Julia Hobsbawm and Andy Hobsbawm. He had an out-of-wedlock son, Joshua Bennathan, who was born in 1958 His cousin was the poet and critic Philip Hobsbaum, notable for his opposition to academic Marxism.

== Death ==
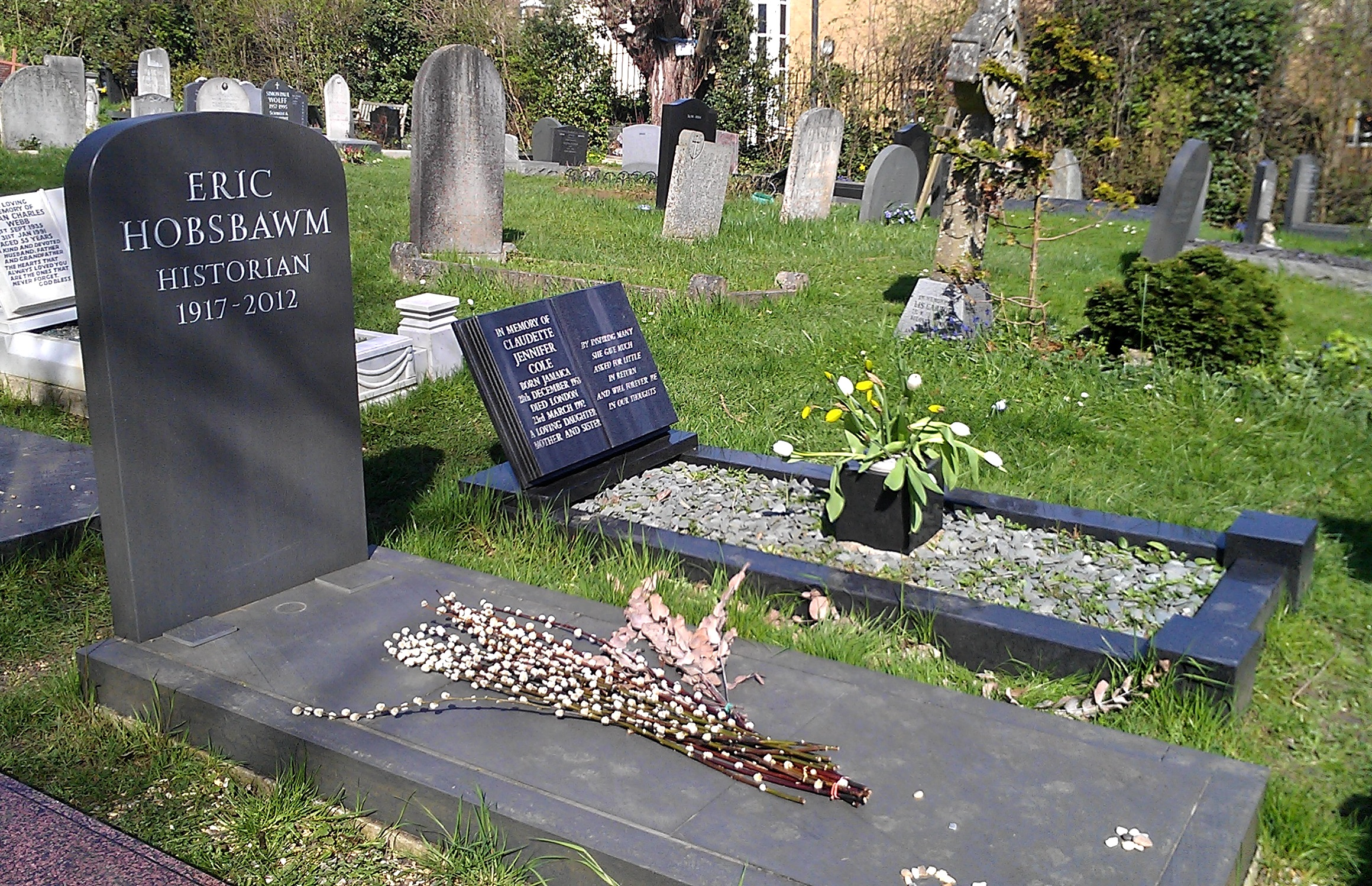
Hobsbawm's grave in Highgate Cemetery

Hobsbawm died from complications of pneumonia and leukaemia at the Royal Free Hospital in London on 1 October 2012, aged 95. His daughter, Julia, said: "He'd been quietly fighting leukaemia for a number of years without fuss or fanfare. Right up until the end he was keeping up what he did best, he was keeping up with current affairs, there was a stack of newspapers by his bed".

Following Hobsbawm's death reactions included praise for his "sheer academic productivity and prowess" and "tough reasoning" in The Guardian. Reacting to news of Hobsbawm's death, Ed Miliband called him "an extraordinary historian, a man passionate about his politics ... He brought history out of the ivory tower and into people's lives".

He was cremated at Golders Green Crematorium and his ashes were interred in Highgate Cemetery, very close to Karl Marx. A memorial service for Hobsbawm was held at the New School in October 2013.

== Impact ==
Owing to his status as a widely read and prominent Communist historian, and the fact that his ideology had influenced his work, Hobsbawm has been credited with spreading Marxist thought around the globe. His writings reached particular prominence in India and Brazil in the 1960s and 1970s at a time of lively debate about these countries' political and social future. Emile Chabal, in an essay for Aeon, wrote: "In the period from the early 1960s to the late '80s, Marxists in non-communist countries were increasingly able to participate in a transnational discussion over the past and future of capitalism, and the most promising agents of revolutionary change. Hobsbawm played a starring role in these discussions – and, occasionally, set the agenda."

== Partial publication list ==
A complete list of Eric Hobsbawm's publications, private papers and other unpublished material can be found in the Eric Hobsbawm Bibliography.

Book	Date	Publisher	ISBN	Notes	Cites
Labour's Turning Point: Extracts from Contemporary Sources	1948	Lawrence & Wishart	ISBN 0-901759-65-1		
Primitive Rebels: Studies in Archaic Forms of Social Movements in the 19th and 20th Centuries	1959, 1963, 1971	Manchester University Press	ISBN 0-7190-0493-4	in the US: Social Bandits and Primitive Rebels, Free Press, 1960	
The Jazz Scene	1959	Weidenfeld & Nicolson	ISBN 0-297-79568-6	as Francis Newton	
The Age of Revolution: Europe 1789–1848	1962	Abacus (UK); Vintage Books (U.S.)	ISBN 0-679-77253-7		
Labouring Men: studies in the history of labour	1964	Weidenfeld & Nicolson	ISBN 0-297-76402-0		
Pre-Capitalist Economic Formations	1965	Lawrence & Wishart	ISBN 0-7178-0165-9	editor; essays by Karl Marx	
Industry and Empire: From 1750 to the Present Day	1968	Pelican	ISBN 0-14-013749-1		
Bandits	1969, 1981	Weidenfeld & Nicolson, Pantheon Books	ISBN 0-394-74850-6		
Captain Swing	1969	Lawrence & Wishart	ISBN 0-85315-175-X	with George Rudé	
Revolutionaries: Contemporary Essays	1973	Weidenfeld & Nicolson	ISBN 0-297-76549-3		
The Age of Capital: 1848–1875	1975	Weidenfeld & Nicolson	ISBN 0-297-76992-8		
Italian Road to Socialism: An Interview by Eric Hobsbawm with Giorgio Napolitano	1977	Lawrence Hill and Co	ISBN 0-88208-082-2		
The History of Marxism: Marxism in Marx's day, Vol. 1	1982	Harvester Press	ISBN 0-253-32812-8	editor	
The Invention of Tradition	1983	Cambridge University Press	ISBN 0-521-43773-3	editor, with Terence Ranger	
Worlds of Labour: Further Studies in the History of Labour	1984	Weidenfeld & Nicolson	ISBN 0-297-78509-5	in the US as Workers: Worlds of Labor, Pantheon Books, 1984	
The Age of Empire: 1875–1914	1987	Weidenfeld & Nicolson (First Edition)	ISBN 0-521-43773-3		
Politics for a Rational Left: Political Writing, 1977–1988	1989	Verso	ISBN 0-86091-958-7		
Echoes of the Marseillaise: Two Centuries Look Back on the French Revolution	1990	Verso	ISBN 0-86091-937-4		
Nations and Nationalism Since 1780: Programme, Myth, Reality	1990	Cambridge University Press	ISBN 0-521-33507-8		
The Age of Extremes: The Short Twentieth Century, 1914–1991	1994	Michael Joseph (UK); Vintage Books (U.S.)	ISBN 0-679-73005-2	along with its three prequels: The Making of the Modern World, The Folio Society, London, 2005	
Art and Power: Europe Under the Dictators exhibition catalogue	1995	Hayward Gallery	ISBN 0-500-23719-0	editor, with Dawn Ades, David Elliott, Boyd Whyte Iain and Tim Benton	
On History	1997	Weidenfeld & Nicolson	ISBN 0-349-11050-6		
1968 Magnum Throughout the World	1998	Hazan	ISBN 2-85025-588-2	editor, with Marc Weitzmann	
Behind the Times: Decline and Fall of the Twentieth-Century Avant-Gardes	1998	Thames and Hudson	ISBN 0-500-55031-X		
Uncommon People: Resistance, Rebellion and Jazz	1998	Weidenfeld & Nicolson	ISBN 0-297-81916-X		
Karl Marx and Friedrich Engels, The Communist Manifesto: A Modern Edition	1998	Verso	ISBN 1-85984-898-2	editor	
The New Century: In Conversation with Antonio Polito	2000	Little, Brown	ISBN 0-316-85429-8	in the US: On the Edge of the New Century, The New Press, 2001	
Interesting Times: A Twentieth-Century life	2002	Allen Lane	ISBN 0-7139-9581-5	autobiography	
Globalisation, Democracy and Terrorism	2007	Little, Brown	ISBN 0-316-02782-0	a part of it in the US: On Empire: America, War, and Global Supremacy, Pantheon, 2008	
How to Change the World: Tales of Marx and Marxism	2011	Little, Brown	ISBN 1-4087-0287-8		
Fractured Times: Culture and Society in the 20th Century	2013	Little, Brown	ISBN 14087-0428-5		
Viva la Revolucion: Hobsbawm on Latin America	2016	Little, Brown	ISBN 14087-0707-1	Collected political and historical essays on the history of Latin America	
On Nationalism	2021	Little, Brown	ISBN 14087-1157-5	Collected essays on Nationalism	

== Honours and awards ==
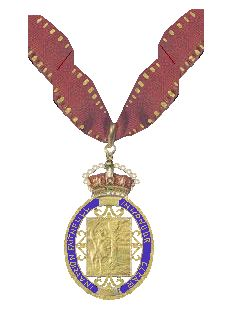
Insignia of a Member of the Order of the Companions of Honour

- 1973: Honorary Fellow, King's College, Cambridge
- 1978: Fellow of the British Academy
- 1995: Deutscher Memorial Prize; Lionel Gelber Prize
- 1996: Wolfson History Oeuvre Prize
- 1998: Member of the Order of the Companions of Honour
- 1999: Buchpreis zur Europäischen Verständigung Leipziger Buchpreis zur Europäischen Verständigung (Hauptpreis)
- 1999: Honorary degree from Universidad de la República Montevideo, Uruguay
- 2000: Ernst Bloch Prize
- 2003: Balzan Prize recipient
- 2006: Fellow of the Royal Society of Literature
- 2008: Honorary citizenship from Vienna
- 2008: Honorary degree from University of Vienna
- 2008: Honorary degree from Charles University in Prague
- 2008: Bochum History Prize

== See also ==
- Independent Jewish Voices

== Notes ==
Awards
Preceded by Justin Rosenberg	Deutscher Memorial Prize; 1995	Succeeded by Donald Sassoon
