= Dual revolution =

1789-1848 period of major social and technological changes in Hobsbawm's historiography

The dual revolution was a term first coined by Eric Hobsbawm. It refers specifically to the time period between 1789 and 1848 in which the political and ideological changes of the French Revolution fused with and reinforced the technological and economic changes of the Industrial Revolution. The French Revolution, inspired by the ideals of Enlightenment philosophy, spread ideas of democracy, nationalism, and liberalism. These political ideas were fused with the new technological advances of the industrial revolution such as the spinning jenny, steam engines, and the puddling process. With the defeat of the French Revolution and subsequently the Congress of Vienna, Metternich constructed a balance of power in Europe that would prevent one country from gaining too much power. This set the framework for a strong conservative, reactionary stance against the ideas of nationalism and liberalism spread by the dual revolution. The Holy Alliance, formed by Austria, Prussia and Russia in September 1815 became a symbol of oppression to the ideas spread by the dual revolution.

== Industrial Revolution ==
Generally, the Industrial Revolution refers to the transitional period in which machine produced goods rose in dominance. In the case of the dual revolution, the Industrial portion was more from social scientists like Count Henri de Saint-Simon, Charles Fourier, Louis Blanc, Pierre Joseph Proudhon, and Karl Marx who attempted to come up with ideas for “utopias”, conservative and socialist societies.

== French Revolution ==
The French Revolution began in 1789 with the Tennis Court Oath, by which the members of the third estate, who had been locked out of the meeting the estates general, gathered together and swore not to disband until they had written a new constitution. Inspired by the ideas of Enlightenment Philosophers, most prominently Rousseau and his social contract, the National assembly, those who had sworn the tennis court oath, published the Declaration of the Rights of Man and of the Citizen. The Declaration of the Rights of Man was very much an expression of Enlightenment ideals. A major portion of the Declaration was dedicated to the natural rights of man. According to the Declaration every man is entitled to life, liberty and property. This is a reflection of the beliefs of John Locke who wrote the 2nd treatise of civil government. The Committee of Public Safety, headed by Robespierre, which rose to power after using the sans culotte to imprison the other members of the Jacobin club, was based on Rousseau's Social Contracts idea of the general will. Rousseau states that at times people have to sacrifice their natural rights for the greater good which is represented by the General Will. The General Will is not necessarily represented by the majority, a far-seeing minority can represent the general will. Robespierre believed that the Committee of Public Safety represented the general will. Robespierre used an aggressive revolutionary purge of those who opposed the Committee called the Terror, a planned economy, and French Nationalism inspired by the revolution to increase French military size and push armies into most of western Europe.

=== Nationalism ===
Nationalism was a driving force for European politics after the French revolution. The ideas of Nationalism emphasized both national pride and that each nation, which consists of a people of the same culture and language should coincide with the boundaries of the state. Metternich, the Austrian Chancellor, was conservative precisely because nationalism was very dangerous to the massive, multi-ethnic Austria. Increased national identity and pride garnered from the successes of ones country were another reason for increased European colonialism during the later parts of the 19th century.

=== Liberalism ===
Liberalism was a major movement post French Revolution. It was an expression of enlightenment ideals. Liberals believed in freedom of the press, freedom of speech, civil rights, fair elections, capitalism, freedom of religion and private property. Ideas of liberalism greatly influenced the 1848 revolutions which were led by students and the middle class.

=== Conservatism ===
Conservatism is based on traditional strategies like absolute monarchies. It is a reactionary stance against the ideas spread by the dual revolution. Conservatism is closely linked to Classicism.

== See also ==
- Eric Hobsbawm
- Long nineteenth century (1789-1914), another term popularized by Hobsbawm
- The Age of Revolution: Europe 1789–1848
