= Dhaneshwar Mandal =

Indian historian and archaeologist

Dhaneshwar Mandal is a retired Professor in Ancient History, Culture and Archaeology at Allahabad University. He is widely known for his strong position against the excavations at the Babri Masjid site in Ayodhya conducted by the Archaeological Survey of India.

== Life and career ==
Mandal joined the University of Allahabad as an exploration assistant in 1960. He rose to become a Professor and retired in 1993; though not having a PhD, he had supervised multiple doctoral scholars.

== Ayodhya dispute ==
Mandal came to prominence with the publication of his book Ayodhya: Archaeology after Demolition in 1994. The book was written in response to two pieces of evidence. In 1990, the archaeologist B. B. Lal had announced that he had discovered pillar bases during his excavation in Ayodhya during 1975–80, next to the Babri Masjid site. This implied that there was another structure, presumably a temple, under the Babri Masjid, and gave rise to considerable consternation among the secularist academic groups. Secondly, after the demolition of Babri Masjid by the Vishva Hindu Parishad and allied groups in 1992, a number of figures and artifacts were discovered in the debris, which formed the basis for a booklet by Y. D. Sharma et al. Mandal's book was a critique of these two pieces of evidence. Of the pillar bases discovered by B. B. Lal, Mandal wrote that they were not aligned with one another and that they belonged to different cultural levels.

In May 2003, the Sunni Central Waqf Board—which rejected that the Babri Masjid used to be at the site of a Hindu temple—pleaded before the Allahabad High Court for allowing Mandal, Shereen Ratnagar, Suraj Bhan, and Sita Ram Roy to examine the excavation conducted by the Archaeological Survey of India (ASI) at the then-demolished mosque; the request was promptly granted. Mandal visited the site only in September, with Ratnagar, after the excavations had long-ceased. All of them went on to depose as expert witnesses for the Waqf Board in the case, faulting the ASI for maintaining a poor stratigraphic record of the finds and rejecting their conclusion about finding a temple underneath the structure.

In 2007, Mandal and Ratnagar co-authored a highly critical appraisal of the excavation titled Ayodhya: Archaeology after Excavation (Tulika Publishers; New Delhi). This, however, brought the umbrage of the Court which held their public discussion of sub-judice matters—involving in-camera submissions like the ASI report and depositions by other witnesses—as contemptuous. Notwithstanding unconditional apologies on their part and the publisher withdrawing all unsold copies, they were subsequently ordered to submit token fines in what scholars have since characterized as judicial attempts to mediate as well as circumscribe the usual norms of academic debates.

== Works ==
- Radiocarbon dates and Indian archaeology (Vaishali Pub. House, 1972), ASIN B0006CDES2.
- Excavations at Mahagara, 1977-78 (co-authored, University of Allahabad, 1980)
- Beginnings of Agriculture (co-authored with G. R. Sharma et al., Abhinash Prakash, 1980).
- History of Prehistory (co-authored with G. R. Sharma et al., 1980)
- Ayodhya, Archaeology After Demolition: A Critique of the "new" and "fresh" Discoveries (Orient Blackswan, 1993; second edition, 2003), ISBN 8125023445.
- Ayodhya, Archaeology after Excavation (co-authored with S. Ratnagar, Tulika Books, 2007), ISBN 978-81-89487-31-7.

== See also ==
- Archaeology of Ayodhya
