= Drain of Wealth Theory =

Drain of Wealth Theory, or Drain Theory in short, is a term proposed by Dadabhai Naoroji in 1901 for the tribute paid by India under British rule. Naoroji pointed out that the tribute was primarily extracted in the form of home charges, council bills, and various other debts imposed on India which had been incurred by British empire in other colonies.

Recent estimates by Utsa Patnaik and Prabhat Patnaik put the present value of this tribute during the period 1765-1900 at $64.82 trillion for the year 2020. For comparison, the British GDP in 2020 was only $3.25 trillion.
