= Islamic archaeology =

Archaeological study of material related to the history of Islam

Islamic archaeology involves the recovery and scientific investigation of the material remains of past cultures that can illuminate the periods and descriptions in the Quran, and the history of Islam. The earliest Islamic influence in archaeological findings begins to be seen from the era of Marwan I and develops increasingly.

== Early Islamic period ==
One of the rare archaeological findings – possibly from the early Islamic period; transcription of a undated rock inscription found in Saudi Arabia in 2012, without definitions such as Caliph or Amir al-Mu'minin, claimed to be Umar's signature.

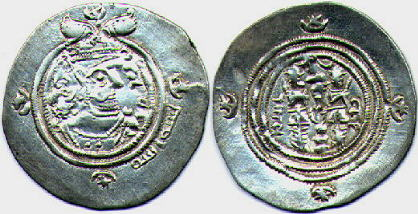
Sasanian style coins during the Rashidun period include the crescent-star, fire altar, depictions of the last Sasanian emperor Khosrow II, and the Arabic bismillāh on the margin. There is no caliph named.

Most Islamic history was transmitted orally until after the rise of the Abbasid Caliphate. At the same time the study of the earliest periods in Islamic history is made difficult by a lack of sources. The stories were written in the form of “founding conquest stories” based on nostalgia for the golden age then. Humphrey, quoted by Antoine Borrut, explains that the stories related to this period were created according to a pact-betrayal-redemption principle. Early Islamic archaeology offers no evidence of a developed Islamic identity during this period. Furthermore, unlike prominent historical figures of the period such as Muawiya I and Abdullah ibn al-Zubayr, no archaeological evidence such as coins, seals, rock inscriptions, tombstones, etc., has been found that could indicate a new Islamic rhetoric predating Abd al-Malik or a political hegemonic state in the name of the four caliphs.

The oldest extant Islamic monument is The Dome of the Rock in Jerusalem which contains some of the earliest extant qurānic text, dated to 692 CE. They vary from today's standard text (mainly changes from the first to the third person) and are mixed with pious inscriptions absent from the Quran. During a six-week period in 1833, Frederick Catherwood produced the first known detailed survey.

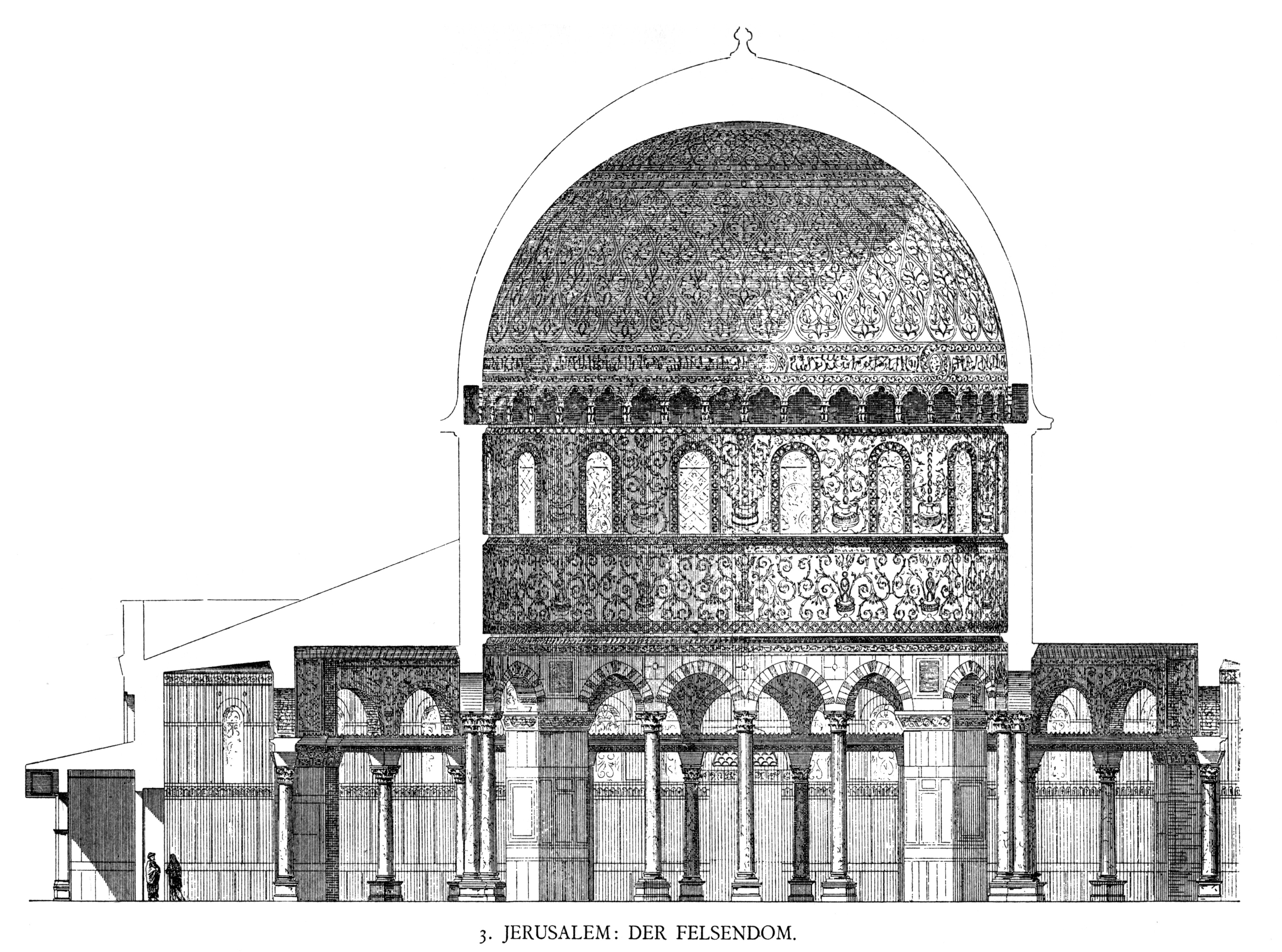
Cross section of the Dome of the Rock (print from 1887, after the first detailed drawings of the Dome, made by Frederick Catherwood in 1833).

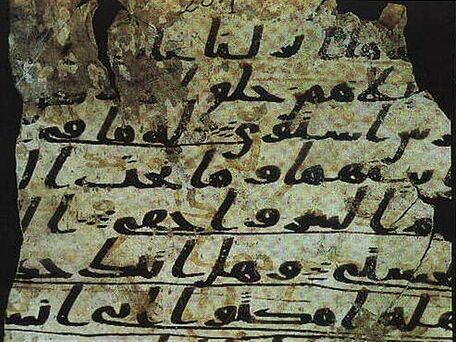
A fragment of Quran's Ta-Ha surah, from the Sanaa manuscript. Possibly the oldest, best preserved and most comprehensive (12,000 parchment fragments) Islamic archaeological document to date.

Pre-Islamic in situ archaeology includes the South Arabian 4th CE rock inscriptions that evidence fewer pagan expressions and the start in use of the monotheistic "rahmān".

Fewer archaeological surveys have taken place in the Arabian peninsula and are considered taboo in Mecca (The Noble) and Medina (The Enlightened City). There is no architecture from the time of Mohammed in either city and the battlefields of the Quran have not been unearthed. Known settlements from the time, such as Khaybar, remain uninvestigated. Archaeological evidence for Quranic narratives yet to be uncovered include that for the ʿĀd who built monuments and strongholds at every high point and their fate evident from the remains of their dwellings.

== History of the field ==
The science of archaeology grew out of the older multi-disciplinary study known as antiquarianism. Early pioneers in Islamic archaeology included Eduard Glaser and Alois Musil. Khaled al-Asaad was principal custodian of the Palmyra site from 1963, overseeing its elevation to a UNESCO World Heritage Site. Some of the earliest areas investigated in Saudi Arabia include Al Faw Village and Madain Saleh. Jodi Magness has covered the archaeology of early Islamic settlement in Palestine. The Museum of Islamic Archaeology and Art of Iran was opened in 1972. It houses tools dating back 30,000 to 35,000 years and crafted by Mousterian Neanderthals in Yafteh. Among the oldest human artifacts are 9,000-year-old and animal figurines from the Sarab mound in Kermanshah Province. The Gaza Museum of Archaeology was opened in 2008. Objects protected from display include Aphrodite in revealing gown, images of ancient deities and oil lamps featuring menorahs. Since 2016 the Al-Qasimi Professor of African and Islamic Archaeology at the University of Exeter, Timothy Insoll, has directed the Centre for Islamic Archaeology. Insoll is also on the editorial board of the Journal of Islamic Archaeology.

== Controversies ==
The Saudi government has been controversially demolishing many early Islamic sites mostly in Mecca and Medina.

A political dispute in the Uttar Pradesh city of Ayodhya, as noted by academic, K. K. Muhammed, has revolved around archaeological issues: whether an archaeological plot, believed the temple birthplace of the Hindu deity Rama, was demolished or modified to create the Babri Masjid mosque.

== See also ==
- Archaeology of Afghanistan
- Archaeology of Iran
- Archaeology of Qatar
- Archaeology of Saudi Arabia
- Archaeology of Yemen

== Sources ==
- Jain, Meenakshi (2013). Rama and Ayodhya. New Delhi: Aryan Books. ISBN 978-8173054518.
- Kunal, Kishore (2016). Ayodhya Revisited. Prabhat Prakashan. ISBN 978-81-8430-357-5.
- Layton, Robert; Thomas, Julian (2003). Destruction and Conservation of Cultural Property. Routledge. ISBN 9780748623105.
- Vansina, Jan (1985). Oral Tradition as History. James Currey Publishers. ISBN 978-0852550076.
