= Ram Janmabhoomi =

Birthplace of Rama in Hindu mythology

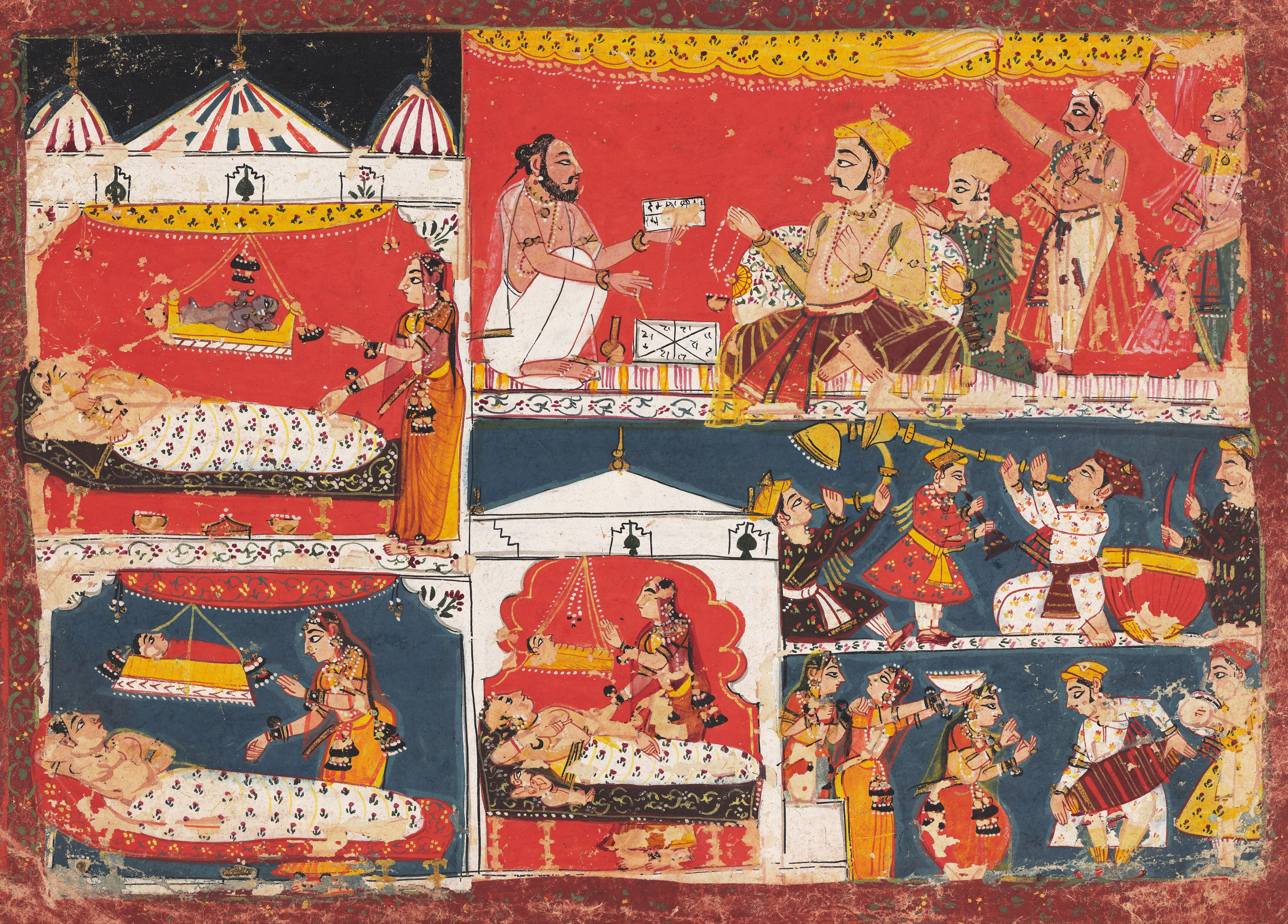
Ayodhya celebrates the birth of Rama and his brothers. Malwa, c. 1650-1660.

Ram Janmabhoomi (lit. 'Birthplace of Rama') is the site that, according to Hindu religious beliefs and texts, is the birthplace of Rama, the seventh avatar of the Hindu deity Vishnu. The Ramayana states that the location of Rama's birthplace is on the banks of the Sarayu river in a city called "Ayodhya". Modern-day Ayodhya is in the north Indian state of Uttar Pradesh. It is contested whether the Ayodhya mentioned in the Ramayana is the same as the modern city.

Some Hindus claim that the exact site of Rama's birthplace is within the grounds where the Babri Masjid once stood in the present-day Ayodhya, with this belief extending back to at least 1785 by a Jesuit missionary Joseph Tiefenthaler. It has been suggested that a temple to Rama formerly existed at the same site as the Babri Masjid until it was replaced by the mosque, an idea supported by a court-ordered report of the Archaeological Survey of India following archaeological excavations around the ruins of the mosque, though the existence of this temple and the conclusions of the report are disputed.

Idols of Rama and Sita were placed in the mosque in 1949. In 1992, the demolition of the Babri Masjid by Hindu nationalists triggered widespread Hindu-Muslim violence. The legal dispute over the property reached the Indian Supreme Court, which ruled in November 2019 that the property be handed to a trust to construct a Hindu temple.

== Historical significance ==
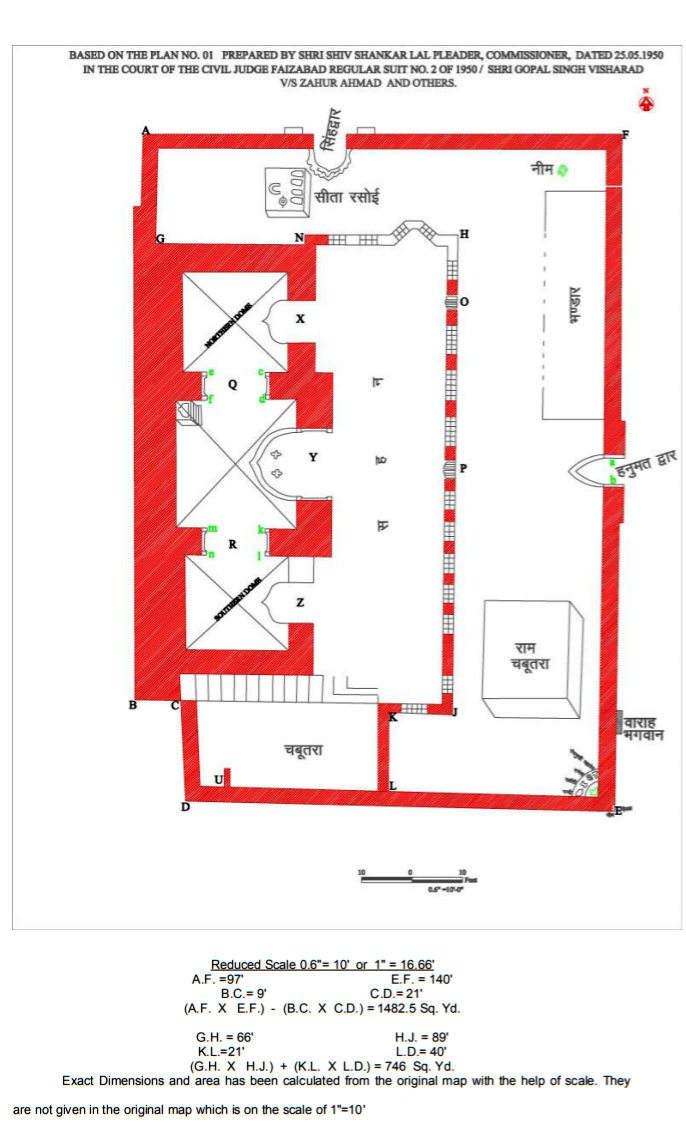
Ayodhya disputed site map

The Ramayana, a Hindu epic whose earliest portions date back to 1st millennium BCE, states that the capital of Rama was "Ayodhya", which may not be the same as modern Ayodhya According to the local Hindu belief, the site of the now-demolished Babri Mosque in Ayodhya is the exact birthplace of Rama. The Babri mosque is believed to have been constructed during 1528–29 by a certain 'Mir Baqi' (possibly Baqi Tashqandi), who was a commander of the Mughal emperor Babur (r. 1526–1530).

In 1611, an English traveller William Finch visited Ayodhya and recorded the "ruins of the Ranichand [Ramachand] castle and houses". He made no mention of a mosque. In 1634, Thomas Herbert described a "pretty old castle of Ranichand [Ramachand]" which he described as an antique monument that was "especially memorable". However, by 1672, the appearance of a mosque at the site can be inferred because Lal Das's Awadh-Vilasa describes the location without mentioning a castle, house or temple. In 1717, the Moghul Rajput noble Jai Singh II purchased land surrounding the site and his documents show a mosque. The Jesuit missionary Joseph Tiefenthaler, who visited the site between 1766 and 1771, wrote that either Aurangazeb (r. 1658–1707) or Babur had demolished the Ramkot fortress, including the house that was considered as the birthplace of Rama by Hindus. He further stated that a mosque was constructed in its place, but the Hindus continued to offer prayers at a mud platform that marked the birthplace of Rama. In 1810, Francis Buchanan visited the site, and stated that the structure destroyed was a temple dedicated to Rama, not a house. Many subsequent sources state that the mosque was constructed after demolishing a temple. Buchanan also recorded that there was an inscription on the wall of the mosque stating it to have been built by Babur.

Police officer and writer Kishore Kunal, who examined Buchanan's documents, states that all the claimed inscriptions on the Babri mosque were fake. According to him they were affixed sometime around 1813 (almost 285 years after the supposed construction of the mosque in 1528 CE), and later repeatedly replaced.

Before the 1940s, the Babri Masjid was called Masjid-i-Janmasthan ("mosque of the birthplace") in common parlance as well as official documents such as revenue records. Shykh Muhammad Azamat Ali Kakorawi Nami (1811–1893) wrote: "the Babari mosque was built up in 923(?) A.H. under the patronage of Sayyid Musa Ashiqan in the Janmasthan temple in Faizabad-Avadh, which was a great place of (worship) and capital of Rama's father."

H.R. Neville, the editor of the Faizabad District Gazetteer (1870), wrote that the Janmasthan temple "was destroyed by Babur and replaced by a mosque." He also wrote "The Janmasthan was in Ramkot and marked the birthplace of Rama. In 1528 A.D. Babur came to Ayodhya and halted here for a week. He destroyed the ancient temple and on its site built a mosque, still known as Babur's mosque. The materials of the old structure [i.e., the temple] were largely employed, and many of the columns were in good preservation."

Al-Hind-u fi al – ‘Ahd al-Isami, by Maulana Shams Tabriz Khan describes "And among them is the great mosque that was built by the Timurid king Babar in the sacred city of Ajodhya. It is believed that Rama Chandra, considered to be the manifestation of God, was born here. There is a long story about his wife Sita. There was a big temple for them in this city. At a certain place Sita used to sit and cook food for her consort. Well, the said king Babar demolished it and built a mosque at that very place with chiseled stone in 923 A.H."

=== Opposition to the claim ===
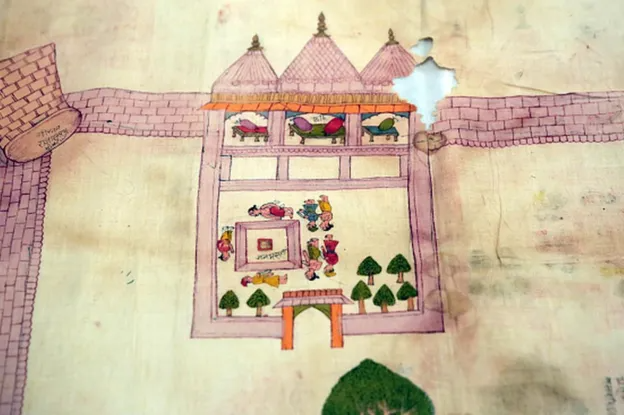
The earliest map of Ram Janmasthan at Ayodhya (1717 CE)

A section of historians, such as Marxist historian R. S. Sharma, state that such claims of Babri Masjid site being the birthplace of Rama sprang up only after the 18th century and Janmabhoomi's location given in the various Ayodhya-mahatmyas does not tally with the Babri Masjid location. Sharma states that Ayodhya emerged as a place of Hindu pilgrimage only in medieval times, since ancient texts do not mention it as a pilgrim centre. For example, chapter 85 of the Vishnu Smriti (contains the earliest list of tirthas) lists 52 places of pilgrimage, which do not include Ayodhya.

Many critics also claim that the present-day Ayodhya was originally a Buddhist site, based on its identification with Saketa described in Buddhist texts. According to historian Romila Thapar, ignoring the Hindu mythological accounts, the first historic mention of the city dates back to the 7th century, when the Chinese pilgrim Xuanzang described it as a Buddhist site.

=== Scholarly debate on Ayodhya city ===
According to the Hindu epic Ramayana, Rama was born in the mythical Ayodhya city on the banks of the Sarayu river. The histories of the contemporary city of Ayodhya and the mythological city of the same name are a matter of debate among scholars. Historian Hans Bakker states that the present-day Ayodhya is distinct from the mythical city, while archaeologist B. B. Lal argues that the archaeological remains at the present-day city are related to the Ayodhya described in the Ramayaṇa. Many historians state that the present-day Ayodhya was likely named "Saketa" until it was renamed in the fifth century CE by a king of the Gupta Empire, though others argue that there is no historical evidence of such a renaming, and state that ancient texts, such as poet Kalidasa's Raghuvaṃśa, use the names Sāketa and Ayodhya interchangeably, suggesting the names refer to a single city.

=== Ram Janmabhoomi Mandir ===
In 1853, a group of armed Hindu ascetics belonging to the Nirmohi Akhara occupied the Babri Masjid site, and claimed ownership of the structure. Subsequently, the civil administration stepped in, and in 1855, divided the mosque premises into two parts: one for Hindus, and the other for Muslims.

In 1883, the Hindus launched an effort to construct a temple on the platform. When the administration denied them the permission to do this, they took the matter to court. In 1885, the Sub Judge Pandit Hari Kishan Singh dismissed the lawsuit. Subsequently, the higher courts also dismissed the lawsuit in 1886, in favour of status quo. The lawsuit was dismissed on the grounds that creating a Hindu temple in close proximity to mosque would create a serious law and order issue. The District Judge held that it was ―most unfortunate that the Masjid should have been built on the land especially held sacred by the Hindus but since the construction had been made 358 years earlier, it was too late in the day to reverse the process.

In December 1949, some Hindus placed idols of Rama and Sita in the mosque, and claimed that they had miraculously appeared there. Home Minister Vallabhbhai Patel and Prime Minister Jawaharlal Nehru directed the state's Chief Minister Govind Ballabh Pant to remove the idols, however Pant was not willing to remove the idols and added that "there is a reasonable chance of success, but things are still in a fluid state and it will be hazardous to say more at this stage". By 1950, the state took control of the structure under section 145 CrPC and allowed Hindus, not Muslims, to perform their worship at the site.

In the 1980s, the Vishva Hindu Parishad (VHP) and other Hindu nationalist groups and political parties launched a campaign to construct the Ram Janmabhoomi Mandir ("Rama birthplace temple") at the site. In 1985, the Rajiv Gandhi government allowed Hindus to access the site for prayers. On 6 December 1992, Hindu nationalists demolished the mosque, resulting in communal riots leading to over 2,000 deaths.

In 2003, the Archaeological Survey of India (ASI) conducted excavations of the site on court orders. The ASI report indicated the presence of a 10th-century north Indian style temple under the mosque. Muslim groups and the historians supporting them disputed these findings, and dismissed them as politically motivated. The Allahabad High Court, however, upheld the ASI's findings. The excavations by the ASI were heavily used as evidence by the court that the predating structure was a massive Hindu religious building.

In 2009, the Bharatiya Janata Party (BJP) released its election manifesto, repeating its promise to construct a temple to Rama at the site.

In 2010, the Allahabad High Court ruled that the 2.77 acres (1.12 ha) of disputed land be divided into 3 parts, with 1/3 going to the Ram Lalla or Infant Lord Rama represented by the Hindu Mahasabha for the construction of the Ram temple, 1/3 going to the Muslim Sunni Waqf Board and the remaining 1/3 going to a Hindu religious denomination Nirmohi Akhara. All the three parties appealed against the division of disputed land to the Supreme Court.

The five judges Supreme Court bench heard the title dispute cases from August to October 2019. The court inferred that the foundation of the mosque was based on the walls of a large pre existing structure dating back to the 12th century whose architectural features are suggestive of Hindu religious origin. The Supreme Court however concluded that there is time gap between the existence of the pre existing structure in 12th century and the construction of mosque in 16th century and no archaeological evidence on the cause of destruction of the underlying structure from this era is available. On 9 November 2019, the Supreme Court ordered the land to be handed over to a trust to build the Hindu temple. It also ordered to the government to give alternate 5 acre land to Sunni Waqf Board to build the mosque. On 5 February 2020, the trust known as Shri Ram Janmabhoomi Teerth Kshetra was created by the government of India.

== Other places ==
Those who believe that Rama was a historic figure, place his birth around 1800 BCE. However, the archaeological excavations at Ayodhya have not revealed any significant settlement before 500 BCE. Consequently, a number of other places have been suggested as the birthplace of Rama.

In November 1990, the newly appointed Prime Minister Chandra Shekhar made an attempt to resolve the Ayodhya dispute amicably. Towards this objective, he asked Hindu and Muslim groups to exchange evidence on their claims over Ayodhya. The panel representing the Muslim organization Babri Masjid Action Committee (BMAC) included R. S. Sharma, D. N. Jha, M. Athar Ali and Suraj Bhan. The evidence presented by them included scholarly articles discussing alternative theories about the birthplace of Rama. These sources mentioned 8 different possible birthplaces, including a site other than Babri Masjid in Ayodhya, Nepal and Afghanistan. One author – M. V. Ratnam – claimed that Rama was Ramses II, a pharaoh of ancient Egypt.

In his 1992 book Ancient geography of Ayodhya, historian Shyam Narain Pande argued that Rama was born around present-day Herat in Afghanistan. In 1997, Pande presented his theory in the paper "Historical Rama distinguished from God Rama" at the 58th session of the Indian History Congress in Bangalore. In 2000, Rajesh Kochhar similarly traced the birthplace of Rama to Afghanistan, in his book The Vedic People: Their History and Geography. According to him, the Harriud river of Afghanistan is the original "Sarayu", and Ayodhya was located on its banks.

In 1998, archaeologist Krishna Rao put forward his hypothesis about Banawali being Rama's birthplace. Banawali is an Harappan site located in the Haryana state of India. Rao identified Rama with the Sumerian king Rim-Sin I and his rival Ravana with the Babylonian king Hammurabi. He claimed to have deciphered Indus seals found along the Sarasvati rivers, and found the words "Rama Sena" (Rim-Sin) and "Ravani dama" on those seals. He rejected Ayodhya as the birthplace of Rama, on the grounds that Ayodhya and other Ramayana sites excavated by B. B. Lal do not show evidence of settlements before 1000 BCE. He also claimed that the writers of the later epics and the Puranas got confused because the ancient Indo-Aryans applied their ancient place names to the new place names as they migrated eastwards.

== Archaeological Survey of India ==
=== First Excavation ===
A team from the Archaeological Survey of India under B. B. Lal conducted a survey of the land in 1976–77. They found 12 pillars of the mosque that were made from the remains of a Hindu temple. The base of the pillars had a Purna Kalasha which was a 'ghada' (water pitcher) from which foliage would be coming out. These symbols were found in almost all the temples of the 12th and 13th Century. For Hindus, it is one of the eight auspicious symbols of prosperity also known as Ashtamangala Chinha. The excavation team found many terracotta sculptures that depicted human beings and animals, a characteristic of a temple, not a mosque.

=== Second excavation ===
In 2003, A 50 plus member team of Archeological Survey of India did the second excavation. They found over 50 pillars, hinting that below the mosque stood a Hindu temple that could be dated back to the 12th Century AD.

==== Temple Pranali ====
The excavators further found a temple system that depicted a crocodile (a symbol of the Holy Ganga) to signify a symbolic bath in the holy rivers of the Ganges, Yamuna and Saraswati to wash off one's sins. They also got the temple 'pranali' (system). We have to bathe the deity and the 'abhisheka jal' flows through 'pranali'. This 'makara pranali' was also excavated.

==== Kalasha, Amalkam Grivaha and Shikhara ====
The ASI team unearthed several remains of a temple's 'shikhara' (tower) from the mosque's premises, adding to the evidences of a Hindu structure underneath ASI team also found another architectural member known as 'amalka'. Below the 'amalka' there is the 'grivah' and also the 'shikhara' portion of the temple in North India.

==== Terracotta remains ====
The ASI archaeologists found 263 pieces of terracotta objects of gods, goddesses, human figures, female figurines that consolidated the theory that it was the site of a temple.

==== Vishnu Hari Shila Phalak ====
An inscription of 'Vishnu Hari Shila Phalak' was found on two remains found at the site that proved to be an important circumstantial evidence that stated the existence of a Hindu temple there.

2023 excavations to construct new Rama Temple

In 2023, during excavation to make Rama temple after Supreme Court order, remains of ancient temple, idols, and pillars were found.

In 2024, BR Mani, the archaeologist who led the 2003 excavations urged the central government to release the ASI report to put all the doubts regarding the report to rest. He also interprets the evidence from excavations to claim that there was human force involved in the destruction of the found structure and the structure was not destroyed because of any natural calamity. He claims the destruction took place at about the same time when mosque was being built. Further, he says the court didn't comment on whether the destruction took place because ASI report was only meant to report findings and not interpret those findings. He said that excavations show that the history of the site can be traced back to 17th century BCE which contradicts the earlier scholarly claim that history of Ayodhya started at 7th century BCE

== Construction of Ram Mandir ==
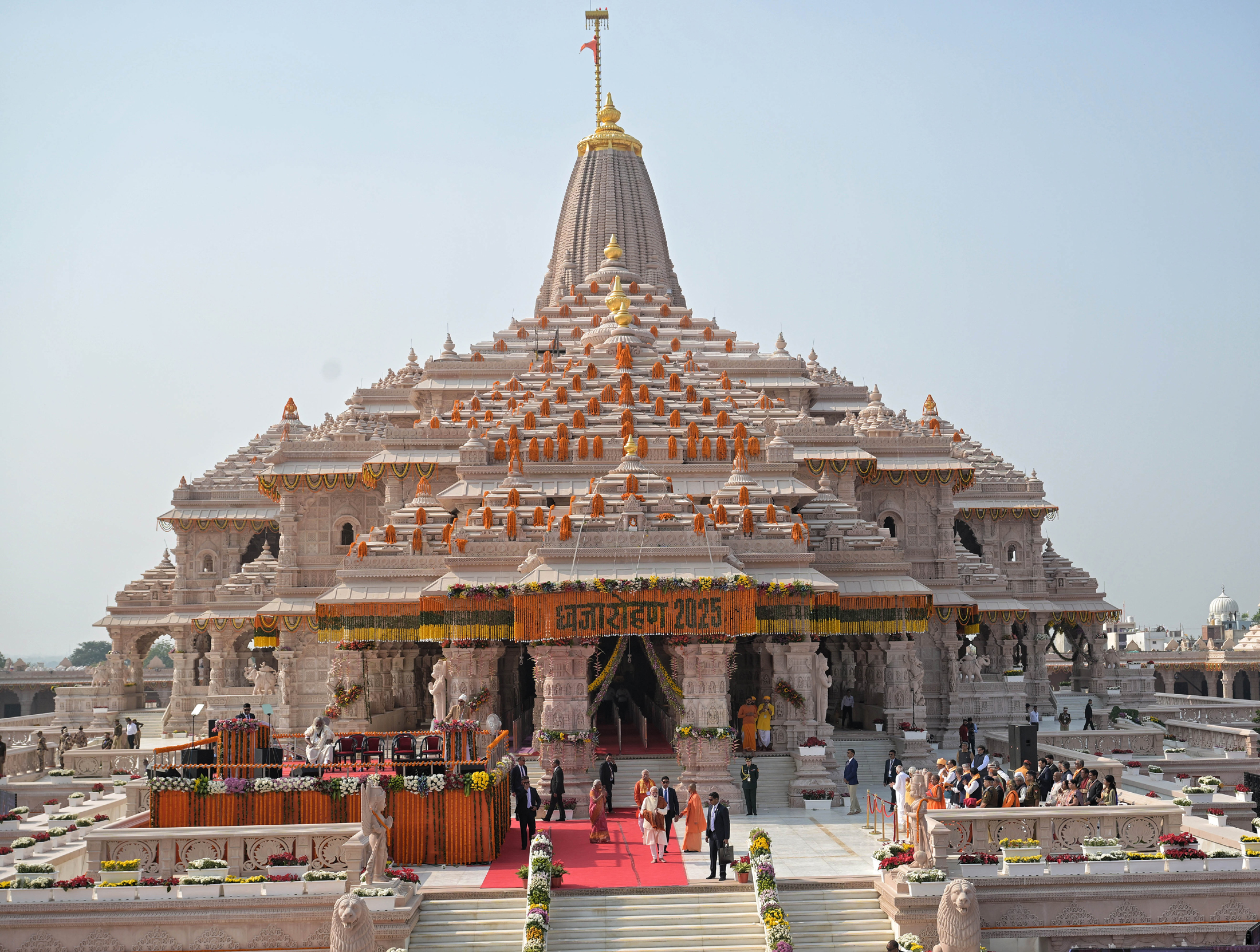
Ram Mandir in 2025.

The Shri Ram Janmabhoomi Teerth Kshetra trust began the first phase of construction of the Ram Mandir in March 2020. Prime Minister Narendra Modi performed Bhoomi Pujan and laid the foundation stone of the Ram Temple in Ayodhya on 5 August 2020.

== See also ==
- Ram Mandir
- Rama Setu
- Balak Ram, deity of Rama at Ram Janmabhoomi temple of Ayodhya
- Punaura Dham, Sita birthplace temple corridor
- Krishna Janmasthan Temple Complex

== Bibliography ==
- Jain, Meenakshi (2013). Rama and Ayodhya. New Delhi: Aryan Books. ISBN 978-8173054518.
- Kunal, Kishore (2016), Ayodhya Revisited, Prabhat Prakashan, ISBN 978-81-8430-357-5
- Narain, Harsh (1993). The Ayodhya Temple Mosque Dispute: Focus on Muslim Sources. Delhi: Penman Publishers. ISBN 978-8185504162.
- Thapar, Romila (2000). "A Historical Perspective on the Story of Rama". In Thapar, Romila (ed.). Cultural Pasts: Essays in Early Indian History. New Delhi: Oxford University Press. ISBN 0-19-564050-0.
