= Social Sciences (disambiguation) =

The social sciences are academic disciplines concerned with society and the relationships among individuals within a society.

Social Sciences may also refer to:

- Social Sciences (MDPI journal), published by MDPI
- Social Sciences (Science Publishing Group journal), published by Science Publishing Group
- The Social Sciences (Medwell Journals journal), published by Medwell Journals
- Social Scientist, published by the Indian School of Social Sciences and Tulika Books
