= Gautam Bhatia =

Gautam Bhatia may refer to:

- Gautam Bhatia (architect) (born 1952), Indian architect
- Gautam Bhatia (lawyer) (born 1988), Indian lawyer
