= Shereen Ratnagar =

Indian archaeologist (1944–2026)

Shereen F. Ratnagar (1944 – 25 May 2026) was an Indian archaeologist whose work focused on the Indus Valley civilization. She was the author of several books and academic textbooks.

== Education and career ==
Ratnagar was educated at Deccan College, University of Pune. She studied Mesopotamian archaeology at the Institute of Archaeology, University College London. She was a professor of archaeology and ancient history at the Centre for Historical Studies at the Jawaharlal Nehru University, Delhi. She retired in 2000, and was an independent researcher living in Mumbai. She is noted for work on investigating the factors contributing to the end of the Indus Valley Civilization.

== Ayodhya dispute ==
In May 2003, the Sunni Central Waqf Board—which rejected that the Babri Masjid used to be at the site of a Hindu temple—pleaded before the Allahabad High Court for allowing Ratnagar, Suraj Bhan, and Dhaneshwar Mandal to examine the excavation conducted by the Archaeological Survey of India (ASI) at the then-demolished mosque; the request was promptly granted. Ratnagar visited the site twice — once in June and then in September, with Mandal, after the excavations had ceased. All of them went on to depose as expert witnesses for the Waqf Board in the case, faulting the ASI for maintaining a poor stratigraphic record of the finds and rejecting their conclusion about finding a temple underneath the structure.

In 2007, Ratnagar and Mandal co-authored a highly critical appraisal of the excavation titled Ayodhya: Archaeology after Excavation (Tulika Publishers; New Delhi). This, however, brought the umbrage of the Court which held their public discussion of sub-judice matters—involving in-camera submissions like the ASI report and depositions by other witnesses—as contemptuous. Notwithstanding unconditional apologies on their part and the publisher withdrawing all unsold copies, they were subsequently ordered to submit token fines in what scholars have since characterized as judicial attempts to mediate as well as circumscribe the usual norms of academic debates.

== Death ==
Ratnagar died on 25 May 2026, at the age of 82.

== Publications ==
- Encounters, the westerly trade of the Harappa civilization, Oxford University Press (1981).
- Enquiries into the political organization of Harappan society, Ravish Publishers (1991).
- The End of the Great Harappan Tradition, New Delhi: Manohar, ISBN 81-7304-331-0. (2000)
- Understanding Harappa: Civilization in the greater Indus Valley, Tulika Books, ISBN 81-85229-37-6 (2002)
- Mobile and Marginalized Peoples, New Delhi: Manohar (2003)
- Trading Encounters: From the Euphrates to the Indus in the Bronze Age, Oxford University Press (2nd edition), ISBN 0-19-568088-X (2006)
- The Other Indians - Essays on Pastoralists and Prehistoric Tribal People, Three Essays Collective (2004)
- Ayodhya: Archaeology After Excavation, New Delhi: Tulika Books (2007)
- The Timechart History of Ancient Egypt, Worth (2007). ISBN 190302532X.
- Makers and Shapers: Early Indian Technology in the Household, Village, and Urban Workshop, Tulika Books (2007).
- Being Tribal, Primus Books (2010). ISBN 9380607024.
