= K. V. Soundararajan =

Indian archaeologist (born 1925)

Kodayanallur Vadamamalachery Soundararajan (born 17 February 1925) is an Indian archaeologist who served as Superintendent of the Chennai circle and later, a Joint Director General of the Archaeological Survey of India. He was known for his pioneering work in excavating Stone Age and megalithic sites of South India along with Mortimer Wheeler and V. D. Krishnaswami in the late 1940s and the 1950s. Some of the sites excavated by Soundararajan include Sanur (near Chengalpattu) (1950), Kundrathur (1955–56), Perur (1970–71), Malayamputtu (1970–71) and Poompuhar (1970–71, 1973–74).

Soundararajan is known for excavating the submerged city of Puhar in the 1970s. In 1990, he controversially remarked about the presence of an 11th-century AD Hindu shrine underneath the remains of Babri Masjid in Ayodhya.

== Works ==
Papers

- "Stone Age industries near Giddalur". Ancient India. 7. 1952.
- "The lithic industries of Singrauli Basin". Ancient India. 7. 1952.
- "The iconic development of the Tamils". Proceedings and Transactions of the All-India Oriental Conference. 1. 1953.
- "Studies in the Stone Age of Nagarjunakonda and its neighbourhood". Ancient India. 14. 1958.
- "Sanur 1950 & 1952 - A megalithic site in district Chingleput". Ancient India. 15. 1959.
- "A magnificent Saptamatrika group and Parvati from Vadaval, North Gujarat". Prince of Wales Museum Bulletin. 7. 1959–60.
- "The Typology of the Anantasayi Icon". Artibus Asiae. 29: 69–84. 1969.

Books

- Indian Temple styles. New Delhi: Munshiram Manoharlal. 1972.
- Early Chola Temple. Bombay. 1973.
- Glimpses of Indian Culture, History and Archaeology. New Delhi: Sundeep Prakashan. 1980.
- Invitation to Indian architecture. New Delhi: Arnold Heinemann. 1984.
- Kaveripattinam Excavations 1963-73. Archaeological Survey of India. 1994.
