= K. K. Muhammed =

Indian archaeologist (born 1952)

Padmasree Muhammed K K
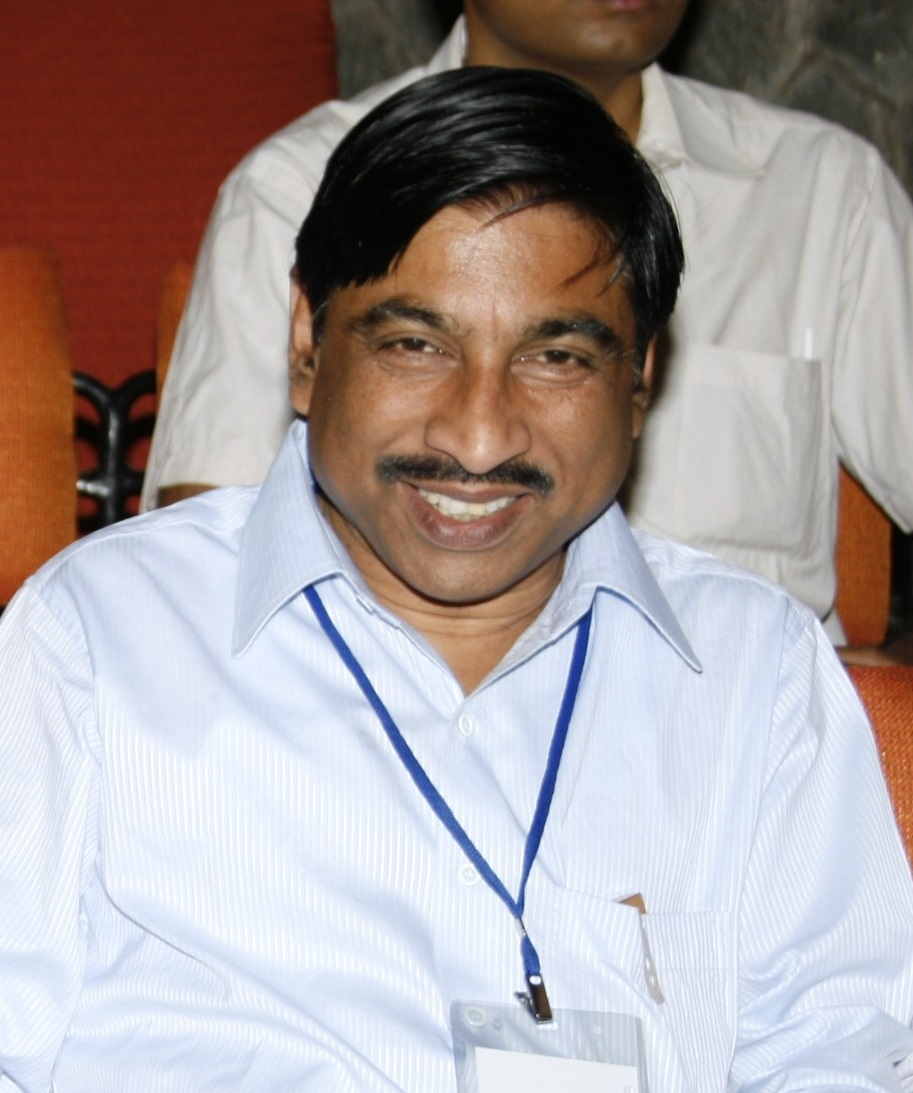
- Muhammed in 2010

Regional Director (North), Archaeological Survey of India
- In office 2012–2019
- Preceded by: Position established
- Succeeded by: Dr. D. N. Dimri

Superintending Archaeologist, Archaeological Survey of India
- Offices Held: Delhi (2008-2012), Bhopal (2004-2008), Chhattisgarh (2003-2004), Agra (2001-2003), Patna (1997-2001)

Dy. Superintending Archaeologist, Archaeological Survey of India
- Offices Held: Goa (1991-1997), Madras (1988-1990)

Personal details
- Born: 1 July 1952 (age 74) Kozhikode, Kerala
- Spouse: Rabiya Muhammad
- Children: Jamshedh Muhammed, Shaheen Muhammed
- Education: Aligarh Muslim University
- Awards: Padma Shri (2019)

Karingamannu Kuzhiyil Muhammed (born 1 July 1952) is an Indian archaeologist who served as the Regional Director (North) of the Archaeological Survey of India (ASI). Muhammed is credited for the discovery of Ibadat Khana, as well as various prominent Buddhist Stupas and monuments. During his career, he undertook the restoration of the Bateshwar Complex, successfully convincing Naxal insurgents and dacoits to cooperate, as well as facelift and restoration of the Dantewada and Bhojeshwar temples.

Muhammed also successfully conceived and executed the idea of building Replica Museum, Delhi, which showcases replicas of Indian statues and stone-carved sculptures. For his contributions to archeology, he was awarded the Padma Shri in 2019, India's fourth highest civilian honour.

== Biography ==
=== Early life and education ===
KK Muhammed was born in Koduvally, Kozhikode, Kerala in a middle-class family to Beeran Kutty Haji and Mariyam. Muhammed is second amongst five siblings. After completing his schooling from Government Higher Secondary School, Koduvally, he obtained his master's degree in history (1973–75) from Aligarh Muslim University and his postgraduate diploma in archaeology (1976–77) from the School of Archaeology, Archaeological Survey of India, New Delhi, India.

=== Career ===
Muhammed served as a technical assistant and then as an assistant archaeologist in the Department of History at Aligarh Muslim University, before being selected as deputy superintendent archaeologist for the Archaeological Survey of India.

Muhammed was initially posted at Madras in 1988 and then at Goa in 1991. He was promoted to superintendent archaeologist in 1997 and subsequently served in many states in India, including Bihar, Uttar Pradesh, Chhattisgarh, Madhya Pradesh and Delhi. During this period, he also served as a tour guide for prominent foreign guests such as Barack Obama and Pervez Musharraf. In 2012, Muhammed was made regional director (North) of the Archaeological Survey of India, and he retired in the same year.

== Major projects ==
=== Ibadat Khana ===
Ibadat Khana was a complex established by Mughal Emperor Akbar in 1575 for hosting religious debates and discussions among theologians and professors of different religions. It was also the structure where Akbar first proclaimed the formation of the composite religion known as Din-e Ilahi.

In the 80s, Muhammed, was a member of a team from the Archaeological Survey of India and Aligarh Muslim University visiting Fatehpur Sikri. With the help of a painting from Akbarnama, he convinced the others to excavate the mound, and they found more proof, including paintings of Christian missionaries from Spain and Italy (Fathers Monserrate and Rudolf Acquaviva).

For centuries, the location of the complex had been controversial among archaeologists and historians, although it is generally accepted to be the place Muhammad discovered.

=== Excavations at Ayodhya's Disputed site ===
K.K. Muhammed was a part of the 1976 excavation of the Babri Masjid, led by B. B. Lal. He stated in a rediff interview that they had found remains of a temple on the western side of the mosque. This temple was built between 10th and 11th century during the Gurjara-Pratihara Dynasty. However, his findings were suppressed by historian Irfan Habib, who he says were very powerful and influential towards the Indian Council of Historical Research and many leading newspapers.

Muhammed also said they found 12 pillars in the excavations which were constructed with Hindu symbolism, including Ashtamangala signs. They had also found terracotta figurines of humans and animals, which Muhammad uses to hypothesize that a temple existed before the mosque.

KK Muhammed further tells that he being the only Muslim involved in the excavations, had to come up by publishing his opinion in The Indian Express newspaper on 15 December 1990 to defend Prof. B. B. Lal who, according to him, was being attacked by the left-wing.

=== Dantewada temples ===
KK Muhammed restored the Barsoor and Samlur Temples in Dantewada District near Jagdalpur, Chhattisgarh. This area is known to be the seat of Naxal activities in the region. In 2003, KK Muhammed was able to convince Naxal activists and with their co-operation, conserved the Temples to its present-day state.

=== Bateshwar Complex restoration ===
Bateshwar, Morena, a complex of 200 ancient Shiva & Vishnu temples situated 40 km away from Gwalior. These temples were built between the 9th and 11th centuries during the Gurjara-Pratihara Dynasty, 200 years before Khajuraho. The area was under the control of Nirbhay Singh Gujjar KK Muhammed was successful in convincing the dacoits to let him do the restoration. He was able to restore 60 temples during his tenure. After the dacoits were eliminated by the police, the area has been under encroachment from illegal mining, as the tremors from the usage of explosives can damage the structure.

In his autobiography, Muhammed alleged that a powerful mining lobby did not allow temple restoration work to go on and he himself made several attempts to get the mining work stopped.

=== Facelifting of Delhi's monuments ===
KK Muhammed was appointed as the Superintending Archaeologist of Delhi Circle, Archaeological Survey of India in 2008. His primary task was to carry out a major facelift and preservation activity at 46 monuments for the Commonwealth Games of 2010.

=== Other prominent tasks ===
- Discovered the first Christian Chapel of North India built by Akbar at Fatehpur Sikri.
- Excavated the Buddhist Stupa of Kesaria built by Emperor Ashoka.
- Discovered and excavated Buddhist Stupa in Rajgir.
- Excavated the Buddhist archaeological site in Kolhua, Vaishali.
- Located and excavated a number of rock cut caves, Umbrella Stones, Cists and Dolmens in Kozhikode and Malapuram districts of Kerala.
- Muhammed conceived and executed the idea of building a Museum that showcases replicas of Indian statues and stone-carved sculptures. The museum, called the Replica Museum, is situated outside the Siri Fort Sports Complex, behind Siri Fort Auditorium in Delhi.

== Autobiography ==
ഞാനെന്ന ഭാരതീയൻ
- Language: Malayalam
- Genre: Non-fiction; Autobiography
- Publisher: Mathrubhumi Books
- Publication date: December 2015
- Pages: 140
- ISBN: 9788182666382 (softcover)

In 2016, KK Muhammad's Malayalam-language autobiography Njan Enna Bharatiyan ("I, the Indian") was released. The book attracted controversy due to his claim that the Marxist historians like Irfan Habib, Romilla Thapar, DN Jha and RS Sharma sided with the hardline Muslim groups and derailed attempts to find an amicable solution to the Ayodhya dispute. According to him, archaeological excavations at Ayodhya clearly indicated the presence of a temple below the mosque, which historians like Irfan Habib dismissed. The Allahabad High Court ultimately rejected the counter-claims made by historians which included Habib.
