= Suraj Bhan (archaeologist) =

Indian archaeologist

- Suraj Bhan
- Born: March 1931; Montgomery, British India
- Died: 14 July 2010; Rohtak, Haryana
- Education: Delhi University
- Occupation: Archaeologist

Suraj Bhan (1931–2010) was an Indian archaeologist and professor of archaeology. His academic work was said to bear a deep imprint of Marxism. He was also involved with the work of Communist Party of India (Marxist) in Haryana and took particular interest in the People's Science movement.

He was part of a panel of academics which contested the Vishva Hindu Parishad's claim that the Babri Masjid was built on top of a Râm temple.

== Life and career ==
Suraj Bhan was born in March 1931 in Montgomery (now in Pakistan) in a peasant family and later migrated to Haryana.

He studied Economics and Sanskrit for a B.A. and M.A. at the Delhi University. Subsequently, he joined the Archaeological Survey of India (ASI) in 1956 as a technical assistant. He studied Archaeology and Culture for a second M.A. degree in 1960 and, in 1972 also received a Ph.D. degree from the M. S. University, Baroda. He went on to a teaching career first at the Punjab University and then in c. 1967 at Kurukshetra University, carrying out archaeology of prehistoric sites in Haryana. He rose to become the Dean of the Faculty of Indic Studies before retiring in 1991.

== Archaeological work ==
Bhan's early research was on the archaeology of prehistoric sites along the old river channels of Sarsuti–Ghaggar and Chautang rivers in Haryana. In 1968, he excavated the Indus Valley Civilisation culture site of Mitathal. His thesis on the "Historic Archaeology of Saraswati and Drishadavati Valleys" earned him a PhD in 1972. In 1975, Bhan published his major report, Excavations at Mitathal and Other Explorations in the Sutlej-Yamuna Divide, which became a fundamental reference for the study of Indus and post-Indus cultures.

In 1987, Bhan was invited to give the presidential address to the Archaeology section of the Indian History Congress, where he came out strongly against the tendency among some archaeologists to identify the Indus Valley Civilisation with the Vedic cultures. His paper in The Making of History volume (2002) countered arguments made by archaeologists, B. B. Lal, S. P. Gupta et al. for an Aryan link to the Indus Valley Civilization.

In 1996, he was awarded a senior fellowship by the Indian Council of Historical Research (ICHR) and a year later, he was appointed as a member of the ICHR council. Irfan Habib, in his obituary of Bhan, believed him to be a man of "impeccable personal ethics, which matched well with his professional probity."

== Ayodhya dispute ==
Suraj Bhan played a significant role during the Ayodhya dispute, supporting the case for the Babri Masjid. He along with historians, Ram Sharan Sharma, Dwijendra Narayan Jha and M. Athar Ali, were a group of four academics who submitted a document titled Babari Mosque or Rama's Birth Place? Historians Report to the Nation to the Minister of Home Affairs in May 1991. Bhan contributed towards the archaeological component of the report. The authors claimed to have scrutinised the evidence provided by the Vishva Hindu Parishad (VHP) and the Babri Masjid Action Committee (BMAC) and rejected outright the idea of the mosque being the site of Rama's birth or of the possibility of it having been built atop a pre-existing temple. The authors dismissed the claim by B. B. Lal, a former director of the ASI, that he had discovered pillar bases next to the Babri Masjid during his excavation in the 1970s. However, they did so while noting that they were not given access to Lal's excavation notes. (Note: Ramjanmabhumi-Babri Masjid: A Historians' Report to the Nation by R. S. Sharma, M. Athar Ali, D. N. Jha, Suraj Bhan (Noorani 2014, pp. 33–46)) Bhan would later testify in the Allahabad High Court that the report had been hurriedly compiled "under pressure" from BMAC.

In October 1992, the four historians wrote in the CPI(M)'s weekly newspaper, People's Democracy, reacting to the booklet Ram Janmabhumi Ayodhya: New Archaeological Discoveries (Note: S. P. Gupta, Fresh Archaeological Discoveries at Ramjanmabhumi (Noorani 2014, pp. 109–116, from BJP Today, 1–15 February 1993)) stating that the VHP protagonists had indulged in "indiscriminate PWD-like excavation." (Note: Noorani 2014: Historians Challenge the VHP's `New Evidence' (pp. 98-103, from People's Democracy, 25 October 1992); Nothing Correlates with Existence of a Pre-Sixteenth Century Temple:Historians (pp. 103-107, from People's Democracy, 8 November 1992); Historians Decry VHP Refusal to See Reason (pp 107-108, from People's Democracy, 15 November 1992); Archaeologist Refutes VHP Claim (p. 108, from People's Democracy, 25 October 1992)) Bhan had earlier also contested statements by S. P. Gupta that the black basalt pillars in the Babri Masjid were once part of a Hindu temple. (Note: Suraj Bhan's Dissection of S. P. Gupta's Conclusions (Noorani 2014, pp. 93–96, from People's Democracy, 3 March 1991)) (Note: Archaeological Evidence - Comment by Suraj Bhan (Gopal 1990, pp. 225–228)

The Babri Masjid was demolished on 6 December 1992.

Suraj Bhan deposed as an expert witness in the Allahabad High Court on behalf of the pro-mosque parties in 2000, 2002, and again in 2006. He was the only one of the four authors of the Historians Report to the Nation to do so. On 5 March 2003, the Allahabad High Court ordered the Archaeological Survey of India (ASI) to excavate the site of the Babri Masjid in order to determine whether a temple-like structure had been demolished before the construction of the mosque. Suraj Bhan joined Irfan Habib and others in issuing a press statement denouncing the move. (Note: Historians' Statement on Allahabad High Court Order for Excavation at the Babri Masjid Site (Noorani 2014, pp. 139–142, 10 March 2003)) The ASI proceeded with its excavations and submitted its findings to the court in September 2003. Its report revealed the presence of a circular shrine, dateable to 7–10th century and a "massive structure", 50 metres by 30 metres, built in three structural phases during the 11–12th century.

Bhan who had visited the digs in June 2003 criticised the ASI for conducting extensive horizontal diggings which destroyed all the Mughal period remains at the site when limited vertical trenching was all that was required. Questioning the methodologies employed to date the underground structure, he accused the ASI report of being an attempt to push back the antiquity of Ayodhya and thereby the Ramayana to c. 1000 BCE. He proclaimed with certainty, that the "massive structure" found by the ASI was not a temple and that it was likely a Sultanate period mosque. (Note: `It was not a temple': Interview with Suraj Bhan (Noorani 2014, pp. 163–169, from Frontline, 26 September 2003))

Bhan appeared in the Allahabad High Court to state his professional opinion that the conclusion of the ASI report regarding the existence of any temple beneath the Babri mosque was baseless. While he was present at the excavation for only three days, he claimed that the ASI did not properly record the glazed ware, glazed tiles and bones found at the site. He made other observations such as on the use of lime mortar which he believed dated the underground structure to the Sultanate period. He also claimed that the shortcomings of the report could not be made good and alleged that the ASI lacked objectivity, professional integrity, and scientific rigour. Under examination, Bhan clarified that he was only an archaeologist and not an art-historian or medieval historian.

In its 2010 verdict on the Ayodhya dispute, the Allahabad High Court criticised the professionalism of the expert witnesses who had appeared on behalf of the pro-mosque parties. On Suraj Bhan, the court felt that he had made vague statements and had failed to provide a proper reason to challenge the conclusions of the ASI. It dismissed as baseless his technical observations on matters such as the use of lime mortar which had been established to have been in use in India from at least 600 BCE, well before the Sultanate period. The court noted that Bhan had a predetermined attitude against the ASI and noted that rather than being condemned, the Survey deserved commendation and appreciation.

== Works ==
- "Excavations at Mitathal (Hissar), 1968." Journal of Haryana Studies 1.1 (1969): 1–15.
- "Changes in the course of Yamuna and their bearing on the protohistoric cultures of Haryana." Archaeological congress and seminar papers. 1972.
- "Siswal, a pre-Harappan site in Drishadvati valley." (1972): 44–46.
- "The sequence and spread of prehistoric cultures in the upper Sarasvati Basin." Radiocarbon and Indian Archaeology (1973): 252–263.
- Excavation at Mitathal (1968) and Other explorations in the Sutlej-Yamuna divide. Kurukshetra University, 1975.
- (with Jim G. Shaffer) "New discoveries in northern Haryana." Man and Environment 2 (1978): 59-68.
- "Recent trends in Indian archaeology." Social Scientist (1997): 3–15. JSTOR 3517757.
- "Aryanization of the Indus Civilisation." The Making of History: Essays presented to Irfan Habib, pp. 41–55. Anthem Press, 2002. ISBN 1843310384.

== See also ==
- Archaeology of Ayodhya
- Ram Janmabhoomi
- Siswal
