= Archaeology of Ayodhya =

Research in Uttar Pradesh, India

The archaeology of Ayodhya concerns the excavations and findings in the Indian city of Ayodhya in the state of Uttar Pradesh, much of which surrounds the Babri Mosque location.

== British-era studies ==
In 1862–63, Alexander Cunningham, the founder of Archaeological Survey of India (ASI), conducted a survey of Ayodhya. Cunnigham identified Ayodhya with Sha-chi mentioned in Fa-Hien's writings, Visakha mentioned in Xuanzang's writings and Saketa mentioned in Buddhist legends. According to him, Gautama Buddha spent six years at this place. Although Ayodhya is mentioned in several ancient Hindu texts, Cunningham found no ancient structures in the city. According to him, the existing temples at Ayodhya were of relatively modern origin. Referring to legends, he wrote that the old city of Ayodhya must have been deserted after the death of Brihadbala "in the great war" around 1426 BCE. When King Vikramāditya of Ujjain visited the city around first century CE, he constructed new temples at the spots mentioned in Ramayana. Cunningham believed that by the time Xuanzang visited the city in 7th century, Vikramaditya's temples had "already disappeared"; the city was a Buddhist centre, and had several Buddhist monuments. Cunningham's main objective in surveying Ayodhya was to discover these Buddhist monuments.

In 1889–91, an ASI team led by Alois Anton Führer conducted another survey of Ayodhya. Führer did not find any ancient statues, sculptures or pillars that marked the sites of other ancient cities. He found "a low irregular mass of rubbish heaps", from which material had been used for building the neighbouring Muslim city of Faizabad. The only ancient structures found by him were three earthen mounds to the south of the city: Maniparbat, Kuberparbat and Sugribparbat. Cunningham identified these mounds with the sites of the monasteries described in Xuanzang's writings. Like Cunningham, Führer also mentioned the legend of the Ramayana-era city being destroyed after death of Brihadbala, and its rebuilding by Vikramaditya. He wrote that the existing Hindu and Jain temples in the city were modern, although they occupied the sites of the ancient temples that had been destroyed by Muslims. The five Digambara Jain temples had been built in 1781 CE to mark the birth places of five tirthankaras, who are said to have been born at Ayodhya. A Śvetāmbara Jain temple dedicated to Ajitanatha was built in 1881. Based on local folk narratives, Führer wrote that Ayodhya had three Hindu temples at the time of Muslim conquest: Janmasthanam (where Rama was born), Svargadvaram (where Rama was cremated) and Treta-ke-Thakur (where Rama performed a sacrifice). According to Führer, Mir Khan built the Babri mosque at the place of Janmasthanam temple in 930 AH (1523 CE). He stated that many columns of the old temple had been utilized by the Muslims for the construction of Babri mosque: these pillars were of black stone, called kasauti by the natives. Führer also wrote that Aurangzeb had built now-ruined mosques at the sites of Svargadvaram and Treta-ke-Thakur temples. A fragmentary inscription of Jayachandra of Kannauj, dated to 1241 Samvat (1185 CE), and a record of a Vishnu temple's construction were recovered from Aurangazeb's Treta-ke-Thakur mosque, and kept in Faizabad museum.

== Excavation of 1969-1970 ==
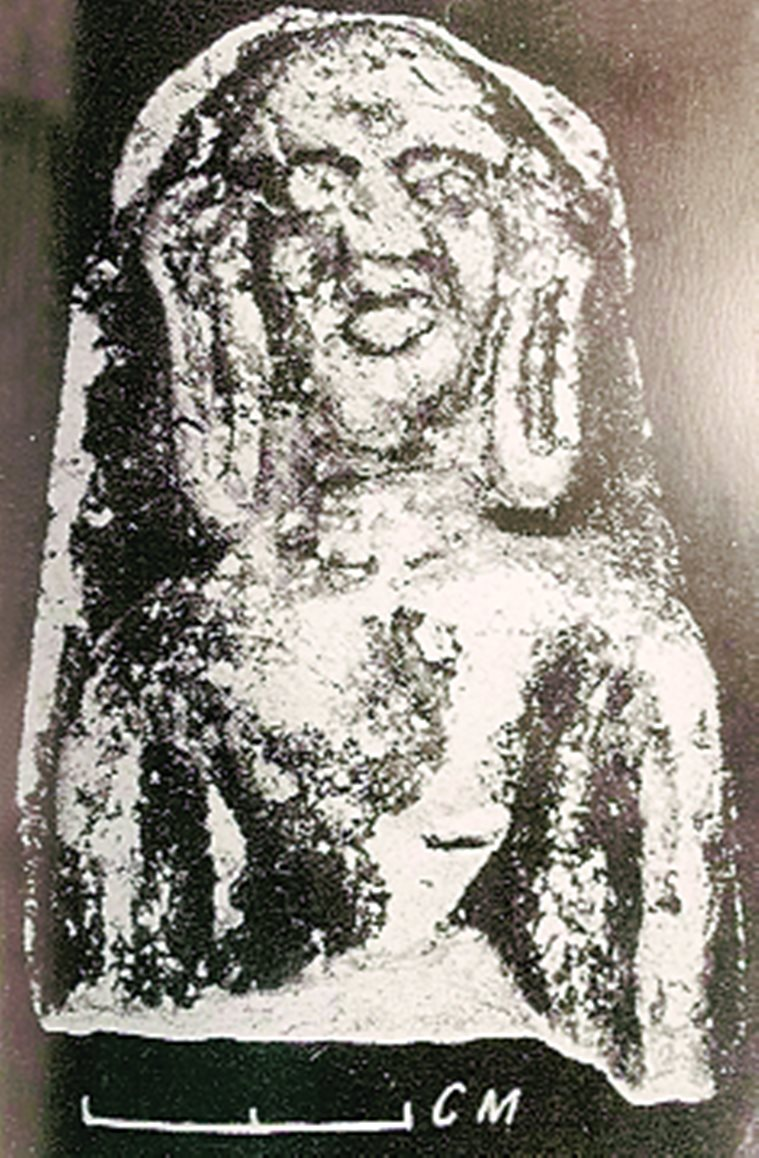
Terracotta figure of Jain ascetic found in B. B. Lal's excavation

Awadh Kishore Narain of Banaras Hindu University led an excavation in Ayodhya during 1969–70. He dated establishment of Ayodhya to early 17th century BCE, and also observed that there was evidence of strong Jain presence in the area.

== Ramayana sites (1975-1985) ==
=== Excavations ===
Professor B. B. Lal led a more detailed ASI study of the area in 1975–76. The team of archaeologists of the ASI, led by former Director-General ASI (1968–1972), B. B. Lal in 1975–76, worked on a project titled "Archaeology of Ramayana Sites", which excavated five Ramayana-related sites of Ayodhya, Bharadwaj Ashram, Nandigram, Chitrakoot and Shringaverapura.

Though the results of this study were not published in that period, between 1975 and 1985 an archaeological project was carried out in Ayodhya to examine certain sites referenced to in the Ramayana or that belong to its tradition. Ascribed to the 14th century AD, it is the oldest image found in Ayodhya. The Babri Mosque site was one of the fourteen sites examined during this project. B. B. Lal conducted excavations in Ayodhya and found a terracotta image showing a Jain ascetic.

== Jain claims ==
Jain Samata Vahini, a social organisation of the Jains stated that the excavation conducted at Hanuman Garhi by Prof B. B. Lal in 1976 threw up a grey terracotta figurine that was dated back to the fourth century BCE, and Prof B. B. Lal, former director-general of the Archaeological Survey of India also acknowledge the same.

== Lal's pillars (1990) ==
Lal took a controversial stance in the Ayodhya dispute. Writing in 1977, Lal stated in the official ASI-journal that finds were "devoid of any special interest."

In 1990, after his retirement, he wrote in a RSS magazine (Note: Manthan, a journal of the Deendayal Research Institute, a front organization of the RSS.) that he had found the remains of a columned temple under the mosque, and "embarked on a spree of lectures all over the country propagating th[is] evidence from Ayodhya." In Lal's 2008 book, Rāma, His Historicity, Mandir and Setu: Evidence of Literature, Archaeology and Other Sciences, he writes (that):

Attached to the piers of the Babri Masjid, there were twelve stone pillars, which carried not only typical Hindu motifs and mouldings, but also figures of Hindu deities. It was self-evident that these pillars were not an integral part of the Masjid, but were foreign to it.

R.S. Sharma and Suraj Bhan both concluded the ruins were 'an ordinary structure of reused bricks, which was neither religious nor monumental'. K. V. Soundararajan, who was Co-Director (with B.B. Lal) of the first phase of the Ramayana Project, endorses this view. He recalls that 'The [pillar bases] are not arranged in any kind of harmony reflecting a common origin.'

In a 2003 statement to the Allahabad High Court, Lal stated that he submitted a seven-page preliminary report to the Archaeological Survey of India in 1989, mentioning the discovery of "pillar bases", immediately south of the Babri mosque structure in Ayodhya. Subsequently, all technical facilities were withdrawn and the project wasn't revived for another 10–12 years, despite his repeated request. Thus the final report was never submitted, the preliminary report was only published in 1989, and in Indian Council of Historical Research (ICHR) volume on historicity of Ramayana and Mahabharat. Subsequently, in his 2008 book, Rama: His Historicity Mandir and Setu, he wrote, "Attached to the piers of the Babri Masjid, there were twelve stone pillars, which carried not only typical Hindu motifs and mouldings, but also figures of Hindu deities. It was self-evident that these pillars were not an integral part of the Masjid, but were foreign to it."

Lal's stance gave an enormous boost to the Ram Temple cause, but his conclusions have been contested by multiple scholars, questioning both the stratigraphic information, and the kind of structure envisioned by Lal. According to Hole,

Later independent analysis of photographs of the trench in which Lal claimed to have found the pillar bases found that they were actually the remains of various walls of different, non-centemporaneous structural phases, and could not have been load-bearing structures (Mandal 2003) [...] other than one photograph, Lal has never made the notebooks and sketches of his excavations available to other scholars so that his interpretation could be tested.

Hole concludes that "the structural elements he had previously thought insignificant suddenly became temple foundations only in order to manufacture support for the nationalists' cause."

B. B. Lal's team also had K. K. Muhammed, who in his autobiography claimed that a Hindu temple was found in the excavation, and said that left historians are misleading the Muslim communities by aligning with fundamentalists.

== June to July 1992 ==
In July 1992, eight eminent archaeologists (among them former ASI directors, Dr. Y.D. Sharma and Dr. K.M. Srivastava) went to the Ramkot hill to evaluate and examine the findings. These findings included religious sculptures and a statue of Vishnu. They said that the inner boundary of the disputed structure rests, at least on one side, on an earlier existing structure, which "may have belonged to an earlier temple". The objects examined by them also included terracotta Hindu images of the Kushan period (100–300 AD) and carved buff sandstone objects that showed images of Vaishnav deities and of Shiva-Parvati. They concluded that these fragments belonged to a temple of the Nagara style (900–1200 AD).

== 1992 - Vishnu-Hari inscription ==
During the demolition of the Babri mosque in December 1992, three inscriptions on stone were found. The most important one is the Vishnu-Hari inscription inscribed on a 1.10 x .56-metre slab with 20 lines that was provisionally dated to ca. 1140. The inscription mentioned that the temple was dedicated to "Vishnu, slayer of Bali and of the ten-headed one". (Note: Rama is an incarnation of Vishnu who is said to have defeated Bali and Ravana.) The inscription is written in the Nāgarī script, a Sanskrit script (or lipi) of the 11th and 12th century. It was examined by world class epigraphists and Sanskrit scholars (among them Prof. Ajay Mitra Shastri).

Ajay Mitra Shastri, Chairman of the Epigraphical Society of India and a specialist in epigraphy and numismatics, examined the Vishnu-Hari inscription and stated:

The inscription is composed in high-flown Sanskrit verse, except for a small portion in prose, and is engraved in the chaste and classical Nagari script of the eleventh-twelfth century AD. It was evidently put up on the wall of the temple, the construction of which is recorded in the text inscribed on it. Line 15 of this inscription, for example, clearly tells us that a beautiful temple of Vishnu-Hari, built with heaps of stone (sila-samhati-grahais) and beautified with a golden spire (hiranya-kalasa-srisundaram) unparalleled by any other temple built by earlier kings (purvvair-apy-akrtam krtam nrpatibhir) was constructed. This wonderful temple (aty-adbhutam) was built in the temple-city (vibudh-alaayni) of Ayodhya situated in the Saketamandala (district, line 17) (...). Line 19 describes god Vishnu as destroying king Bali (apparently in the Vamana manifestation) and the ten-headed personage (Dasanana, i.e., Ravana).

Following allegations that the Vishnu Hari inscription corresponded to an inscription dedicated to Vishnu that was supposedly missing in the Lucknow State Museum since the 1980s, the museum director Jitendra Kumar stated that the inscription had never been missing from the museum, although it was not on display. He showed the inscription held by his museum at a press conference for all to see. It was different in shape, colour and textual content from the Vishnu-Hari inscription.

== 2003 excavations ==
Claude Robillard, the chief geophysicist stated the following:

There are some anomalies found underneath the site relating to some archaeological features. You might associate them [the anomalies] with pillars, or floors, or concrete floors, wall foundation or something. These anomalies could be associated with archaeological features but until we dig, I can't say for sure what the construction is under the mosque.

The Archaeological Survey of India (ASI) excavated the Ram Janambhoomi–Babri Mosque site at the direction of the Lucknow Bench of the Allahabad High Court in Uttar Pradesh in 2003. The archaeologists also reported indications of a large structure that pre-dated the Babri Masjid. A team of 131 labourers was engaged in the excavations. On 11 June 2003 the ASI issued an interim report that only listed the findings of the period between 22 May and 6 June 2003. In August 2003 the ASI handed a 574-page report to the Lucknow Bench of the Allahabad High Court.

The Archaeological Survey of India (ASI), who examined the site, issued a report of the findings of the period between 22 May and 6 June 2003. This report stated:

Among the structures listed in the report are several brick walls 'in east–west orientation', several 'in north–south orientation', 'decorated coloured floor', several 'pillar bases', and a '1.64-metre high decorated black stone pillar (broken) with figurines on four corners' as well as inscription of holy verses on stone in Arabic language.

=== Finds ===
==== Archaeological layers ====
ASI mentioned in its report that they have found ruins of other eras also. These ruins could be the ruins of a Jain temples.

- 1000BCE to 300BCE: the findings suggest that a Northern Black Polished Ware (NBPW) culture existed at the mosque site between 1000 BCE and 300 BCE. A round signet with a legend in Ashokan Brahmi, terracotta figurines of female deities with archaic features, beads of terracotta and glass, wheels and fragments of votive tanks have been found.
- Shunga Period. 200 BC: Typical terracotta mother goddess, human and animal figurines, beads, hairpins, pottery (includes black slipped, red and grey wares), and stone and brick structures of the Shunga period have been found.
- Kushan period. 100–300 CE: terracotta human and animal figurines, fragments of votive tanks, beads, bangle fragments, ceramics with red ware and large-sized structures running into twenty-two courses have been found from this level.
- Gupta era (320–600 CE) and post-Gupta era: typical terracotta figurines, a copper coin with the legend Sri Chandra (Gupta), and illustrative potsherds of the Gupta period have been found. A circular brick shrine with an entrance from the east and a provision for a water-chute on the northern wall have also been found.
- 11th to 12th century CE: a huge structure of almost fifty metres in north–south orientation have been found on this level. Only four of the fifty pillar bases belong to this level. Above this lay a structure with at least three structural phases which had a huge pillared hall.

==== Animal remains ====
Earlier excavations had unearthed animal bones and even human remains. Historians like Irfan Habib have stated that there was Muslim habitation in the area during this period. Earlier excavations had unearthed animal bones and even human remains which could not have been there if the place was indeed a temple. Presence of animal bones, they had been arguing, meant that it was a residential area (and not a shrine) inhabited by a non-vegetarian community. And that it was in that Muslim habitat that a mosque was raised in 1528 or thereafter. The ASI report mentions the bones, but does not explain how they came to be there.

==== Muslim graves ====
Two Muslim graves were also recovered in the excavation, as reported in the Outlook weekly."The graves are below the mosque floor. The ASI officials, in their conservative estimates, have dated them only at 150 years old. It would be much earlier than that. Coupled with the other evidence in the area—the Lakhauri bricks used as construction material (pre-Mughal era), lime mortar as cementing material, bones with cut marks and glazed ware belonging to the early medieval era (9th to 14th century AD)—one can say there's evidence of a Muslim settlement in the area before Babar's time. The ASI should send the samples from the graves for carbon-dating so that we can be sure," says Dr S.Z.A. Jaffri of Delhi University, appointed by the court as observer at the excavation site. While the ASI videographed and photographed the graves on 22 April, it did not perform a detailed analysis of them. The skeletons found at the site were not sent for carbon-dating, neither were the graves measured.

Anirudha Srivastava, a former ASI archaeologist, said that in some trenches, some graves, terracotta and lime mortar and surkhi were discovered which also indicated Muslim habitation. It was surmised, also, that some mosque existed on the site and that Babri was built on the site of another mosque.

=== Criticism of the 2003 excavation ===
The ASI findings were disputed by several archaeologists.

According to archaeologist Supriya Verma and Jaya Menon, who observed the excavations on behalf of the Sunni Waqf Board, "the ASI was operating with a preconceived notion of discovering the remains of a temple beneath the demolished mosque, even selectively altering the evidence to suit its hypothesis." this allegation particularly focused on the "pillar bases" central to the claim of a temple, which Verma and Menon alleged were irregularly shaped, irregularly spaced and largely the result of selective excavation, rather than representing genuine evidence of pillars.

=== Political reaction ===
The leaders of Babri Masjid Action–Reo create more complications, conflict and controversy."struction expressed reservations on the credibility of the ASI in carrying out the assignment impartially, owing to political pressure. ASI comes under the Ministry of Human Resource Development, which was headed by Murli Manohar Joshi, himself an accused in the Babri Masjid demolition case.

The Muslim side expressed doubts on the final ASI report, claiming that the notes and other draft items were supposedly destroyed by the ASI, within 24 hours following the submission of the final report.

There were also attempts by Babri Masjid supporters to prohibit all archaeological excavations at the disputed site. Naved Yar Khan's petition at the Supreme Court to prohibit all archaeological excavations at the Mosque site was rejected. Similarly, there were questions raised as to what level the archaeological digging should reach – should they stop when evidence of a Hindu temple was found? Both Buddhists and Jains asked for the digging to continue much further to learn whether they, too, could lay claim to the site.

Along the same lines as Habib, Muslim Personal Law Board secretary Mohammed Abdul Rahim Quraishi "said a team of well-known archaeologists including Prof. Suraj Bhan had visited the site and inspected the excavated pits and was of [the] opinion that there was evidence of an earlier mosque beneath the structure of the Babri Masjid".

The two agree on a pre-Babri Muslim presence, but Quraishi's "interpretation" of the findings is already starkly at variance with Habib's: the latter saw no mosque underneath, while Quraishi's employee Bhan did.

Noted lawyer Rajeev Dhawan said the Ramjanmabhoomi-Babri Masjid case had taken a wrong turn and the ASI report had no historical or moral significance and the conclusions were based on political considerations. However, Mr. Dhawan said, "The legal case did not relate to the question of whether a temple existed on the site or not".

=== Buddhist claims ===
The Buddhists have also claimed the Ayodhya site. According to Udit Raj's Buddha Education Foundation, the structure excavated by ASI in 2003 was a Buddhist stupa destroyed during and after the Muslim invasion of India. Besides the 2003 ASI report, Raj has also based his claim on the 1870 report of the British archaeologist Patrick Carnegie. According to Carnegie, the Kasauti pillars at the Ayodhya site strongly resemble the ones at Buddhist viharas in Sarnath and Varanasi.

== Court verdict after analysis of the 2003 ASI report ==
In October 2010, after sifting through all the evidence placed before it, the Allahabad High Court, in an order that ran into over 8,000 pages, said that the portion below the central dome under which the idols of Lord Ram and other Gods are placed in a makeshift temple, belongs to Hindus. All three judges agreed that the portion under the central dome should be allotted to Hindus.

The 2019 Supreme Court verdict on Ayodhya dispute states that the entire disputed land of area of 2.77 acres be handed over to a trust to build a Hindu temple. It also ordered the government to give an alternative 5 acre land to the Sunni Waqf Board.

== See also ==
- Ayodhya dispute
- Ram Rath Yatra
- Demolition of the Babri Masjid

== Sources ==
Printed sources

- Bhan, Suraj (1997), "Recent Trends in Indian Archaeology", Social Scientist, 25 (1/2): 3–15, doi:10.2307/3517757, JSTOR 3517757, archived from the original on 2 February 2021
- Coningham, Robin; Young, Ruth (2015), The Archaeology of South Asia: From the Indus to Asoka, c.6500 BCE–200 CE, Cambridge University Press, ISBN 978-0-521-84697-4, archived from the original on 29 December 2023
- Droogan, Julian (2012), Religion, Material Culture and Archaeology, A&C Black
- Gupta, S. P. (1996). "If only the court had examined the evidence". In Dasgupta, Swapan (ed.). The Ayodhya Reference: Supreme Court Judgement and Commentaries. Voice of India. ISBN 81-85990-30-1.
- Hole, Brian (2016), "A Many-Cornered Thing: The Role of Heritage in Indian Nation-Building", in Jenkins, Tiffany (ed.), Political Culture, Soft Interventions and Nation Building, Routledge
- Jain, Meenakshi (2013). Rama and Aydhya. New Delhi: Aryan Books. ISBN 978-81-7305-451-8.
- Lal, B. B. (2008). Rama: His Historicity Mandir and Setu. Aryan Books International. ISBN 978-81-7305-345-0.
- Mandal, Dhaneshwar (2003). Ayodhya, Archaeology After Demolition: A Critique of the "new" and "fresh" Discoveries. Orient Blackswan. ISBN 978-81-250-2344-9. Archived from the original on 29 December 2023.
- Narain, Harsh (1993). The Ayodhya Temple Mosque Dispute: Focus on Muslim Sources. Delhi: Penman Publishers.
- Romey, Kristin M. (2006), "Flashpoint Ayodhya", in Vitelli, Karen D.; Colwell-Chanthaphonh, Chip (eds.), Archaeological Ethics, Rowman Altamira
- Srivastava, Sushil (25 October 2003). "The ASI Report – a review". Frontline. Archived from the original on 20 December 2013.
- Thapar, Romila (2006). India: Historical Beginnings and the Concept of the Aryan. National Book Trust. ISBN 978-81-237-4779-8. Archived from the original on 29 December 2023.
- Thakur Prasad Verma, S.P. Gupta, (2001), Ayodhya ka itihasa evam puratattva- Rgveda kala se aba taka. Delhi: D.K. Printworld (in Hindi)
- Witzel, Michael E. J. (2001). "Autochthonous Aryans? The Evidence from Old Indian and Iranian Texts" (PDF). Electronic Journal of Vedic Studies. 7 (3): 1–115. Archived (PDF) from the original on 13 November 2021.
- Witzel, Michael (2006), "Rama's realm. Indocentric rewritings of early South Asian archaeology and history", in Fagan, Garrett G (ed.), Archaeological Fantasies: How Pseudoarchaeology Misrepresents the Past and Misleads the Public, Routledge

Web-sources
