= Utsa Patnaik =

Indian Marxist economist

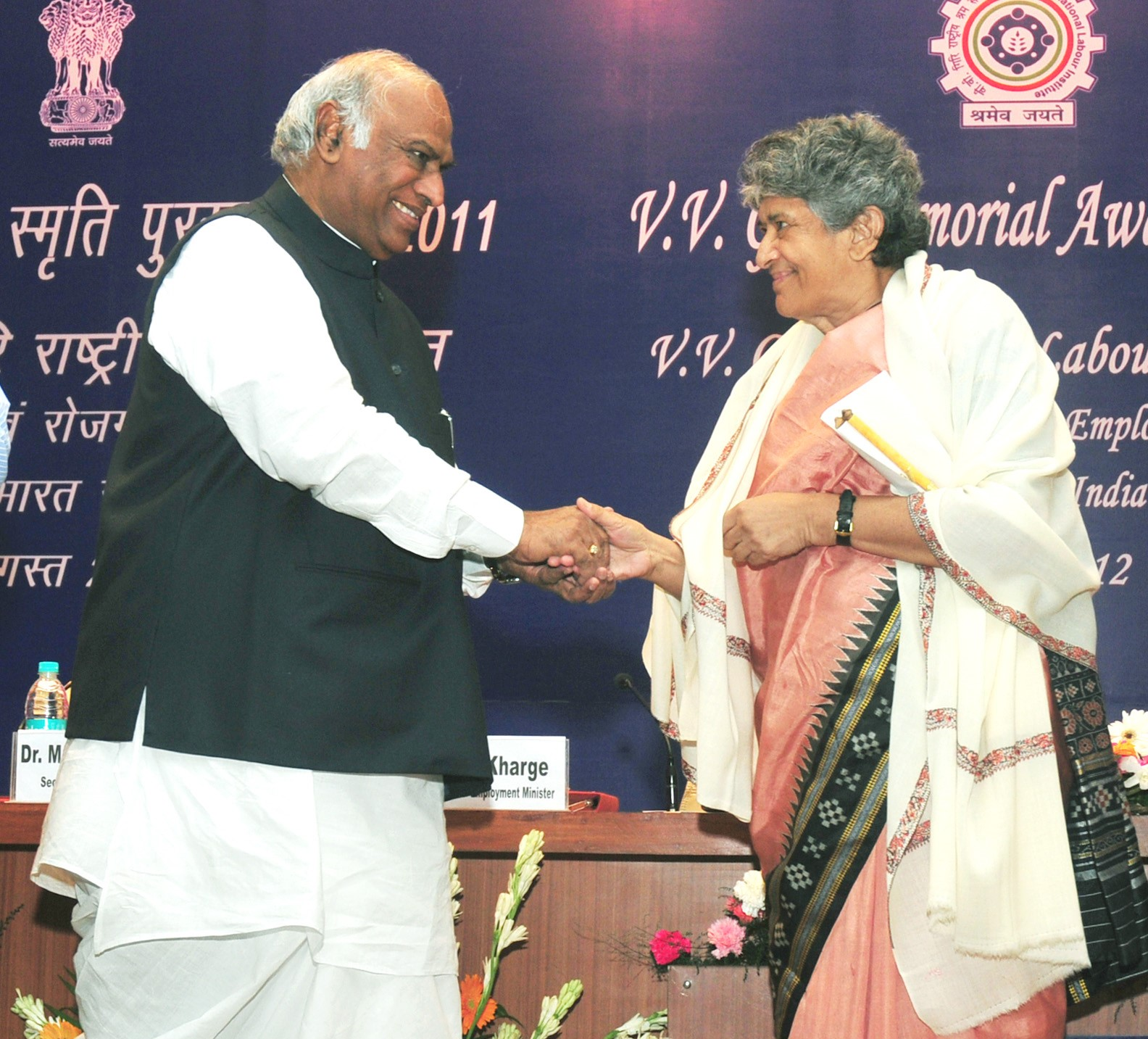
- Patnaik (right), V.V. Giri Award, 2012
- Spouse: Prabhat Patnaik

Academic background
- Education: University of Delhi; Somerville College, Oxford

Academic work
- Institutions: Jawaharlal Nehru University

Utsa Patnaik is an Indian Marxian economist. She taught at the Centre for Economic Studies and Planning in the School of Social Sciences at Jawaharlal Nehru University (JNU) in New Delhi, from 1973 until her retirement in 2010. Her husband is the Marxian economist Prabhat Patnaik.

== Biography ==
Patnaik obtained her doctorate in economics from the Somerville College, Oxford, before returning to India to join JNU.

== Selected works ==
These issues have been discussed in more than 110 papers published as chapters in books and in journals. She has authored several books, including Peasant Class Differentiation – A Study in Method (1987), The Long Transition (1999) and The Republic of Hunger and Other Essays (2007). The Republic of Hunger was directly referenced in a volume published in 2021 titled The Hunger of the Republic: Our Present in Retrospect, the first volume of the India Since the 90s series published by Tulika Books. A German translation of selections from the last book appeared in 2009. She has also edited and co-edited several volumes including Chains of Servitude – Bondage and Slavery in India (1985), Agrarian Relations and Accumulation – the Mode of Production Debate in India (1991), The Making of History – Essays presented to Irfan Habib (2000), The Agrarian Question in Marx and his Successors in two volumes (2007, 2011) and A Theory of Imperial Capitalism.

=== Book reviews ===
- Bagchi, Amiya Kumar. On A Theory of Imperialism. Social Scientist, edited by Utsa Patnaik and Prabhat Patnaik, vol. 45, no. 3/4, Social Scientist, 2017, pp. 87–91.
- Vijay, R. The Agrarian Question and the Marxist Method. Economic and Political Weekly, edited by Utsa Patnaik, vol. 48, no. 35, Economic and Political Weekly, 2013, pp. 27–30.
- Pratt, Brian. Development in Practice, edited by Utsa Patnaik and Sam Moyo, vol. 22, no. 7, Taylor & Francis, Ltd., 2012, pp. 1060–1061.
- Gopinath, Ravindran. Social Scientist, edited by Utsa Patnaik, vol. 36, no. 1/2, Social Scientist, 2008, pp. 94–97.
- Bose, Sugata. The Journal of Asian Studies, edited by Jan Breman et al., vol. 47, no. 4, [Cambridge University Press, Association for Asian Studies], 1988, pp. 912–914, doi:10.2307/2057913.

=== Selected journal articles ===
==== 2010–2019 ====
- Patnaik, Utsa (2014). "Aspects of India's Colonial Economic History". Economic and Political Weekly. 49 (5). Amiya Kumar Bagchi (ed.): 31–39. ISSN 0012-9976. JSTOR 24479145.
- Patnaik, Utsa (2014). "India in the World Economy 1900 to 1935: The Inter-War Depression and Britain's Demise as World Capitalist Leader". Social Scientist. 42 (1/2): 13–35. ISSN 0970-0293. JSTOR 24372997.
- Patnaik, Utsa (2013). "Gurdarshan Singh Bhalla". Social Scientist. 41 (11/12): 79–81. ISSN 0970-0293. JSTOR 23610458.
- Patnaik, Utsa (2013). "Poverty Trends in India 2004–05 to 2009–10: Updating Poverty Estimates and Comparing Official Figures". Economic and Political Weekly. 48 (40): 43–58. ISSN 0012-9976. JSTOR 23528405.
- Swaminathan, M S; Wilson, Bezwada; Sinha, Shantha; Shatrugna, Veena; Roy, Aruna; Mody, Gautam; Drèze, Jean; Agarwal, Bina; Patnaik, Utsa; Bagchi, Amiya Kumar (2013). "Cash Transfers and UID". Economic and Political Weekly. 48 (1): 4–5. JSTOR 23391120.
- Patnaik, Utsa (2013). "Sectional President's Address: India In The World Economy 1900 To 1935: The Inter-war Depression And Britain's Demise As World Capitalist Leader". Proceedings of the Indian History Congress. 74: 682–702. ISSN 2249-1937. JSTOR 44158872.
- Patnaik, Utsa (2012). "Capitalism and the Production of Poverty". Social Scientist. 40 (1/2): 3–20. ISSN 0970-0293. JSTOR 23124193.
- Patnaik, Utsa (2010). "On Some Fatal Fallacies". Economic and Political Weekly. 45 (47): 81–87. ISSN 0012-9976. JSTOR 25764157.
- Patnaik, Utsa (2010). "Jyoti Basu and Bengal". Social Scientist. 38 (7/8): 53–60. ISSN 0970-0293. JSTOR 27866723.
- Patnaik, Utsa (2010). "A Critical Look at Some Propositions on Consumption and Poverty". Economic and Political Weekly. 45 (6): 74–80. ISSN 0012-9976. JSTOR 25664093.
- Patnaik, Utsa (2010). "Trends in Urban Poverty under Economic Reforms: 1993–94 to 2004–05". Economic and Political Weekly. 45 (4): 42–53. ISSN 0012-9976. JSTOR 25664044.

==== 2000–2009 ====
- Patnaik, Utsa (2008). "The Question of Employment and Livelihoods in Labour Surplus Economies". Social Scientist. 36 (5/6): 4–21. ISSN 0970-0293. JSTOR 27644276.
- Krishnan, Vijoo (2008). "The Agrarian Question". Social Scientist. 36 (3/4). Utsa Patnaik (ed.): 100–110. ISSN 0970-0293. JSTOR 27644271.
- Ahmad, Aijaz; Bagchi, Amiya; Shukla, S. P.; Patnaik, Utsa; Nirmal Chandra; M. K. Bhadrakumar; Anuradha Chenoy; Swaminathan, Madhura (2007). "Pause on Indo-US Deal". Economic and Political Weekly. 42 (34): 3438. ISSN 0012-9976. JSTOR 4419928.
- Patnaik, Utsa (2007). "Neoliberalism and Rural Poverty in India". Economic and Political Weekly. 42 (30): 3132–3150. ISSN 2349-8846. JSTOR 4419844.
- Patnaik, Utsa (2007). "New Data on the Arrested Development of Capitalism in Indian Agriculture". Social Scientist. 35 (7/8): 4–23. ISSN 0970-0293. JSTOR 27644228.
- Bagchi, Amiya Kumar; Raina, M. K.; Ram Rahman; Bhattacharya, Malini; Patnaik, Utsa; Alam, Javeed; Bhattacharya, Mihir; Ghosh, Jayati; Rao, Mohan; Tyabji, Nasir; Meena Rajyadhyaksha; Jha, Praveen; Patnaik, Prabhat; Teesta Setalvad; Jha, D. N.; Ruchira Gupta (2007). "On Nandigram". Economic and Political Weekly. 42 (13): 1066. ISSN 0012-9976. JSTOR 4419392.
- Patnaik, Utsa (2005). "Theorizing Food Security and Poverty in the Era of Economic Reforms". Social Scientist. 33 (7/8): 50–81. ISSN 0970-0293. JSTOR 3516886.
- Patnaik, Utsa (2005). "Andre Gunder Frank (1929–2005)". Social Scientist. 33 (5/6): 93–97. ISSN 0970-0293. JSTOR 3517969.
- Patnaik, Utsa (2004). "The Republic of Hunger". Social Scientist. 32 (9/10): 9–35. doi:10.2307/3518206. ISSN 0970-0293. JSTOR 3518206.
- Patnaik, Utsa (2004). "Principal Task on the Agrarian Front". Social Scientist. 32 (7/8): 36–41. doi:10.2307/3518255. ISSN 0970-0293. JSTOR 3518255.
- Patnaik, Utsa (2003). "Food Stocks and Hunger: The Causes of Agrarian Distress". Social Scientist. 31 (7/8): 15–41. doi:10.2307/3518306. ISSN 0970-0293. JSTOR 3518306.
- Patnaik, Utsa (2002). "Agrarian Crisis and Global Deflationism". Social Scientist. 30 (1/2): 3–30. doi:10.2307/3518242. ISSN 0970-0293. JSTOR 3518242.
- Patnaik, Utsa; Sriram Natrajan (2000). "Output and Employment in Rural China: Some Post-Reform Problems". Economic and Political Weekly. 35 (38): 3420–3427. ISSN 0012-9976. JSTOR 4409748.
