= Prabhat Patnaik =

Indian Marxist economist (born 1945)

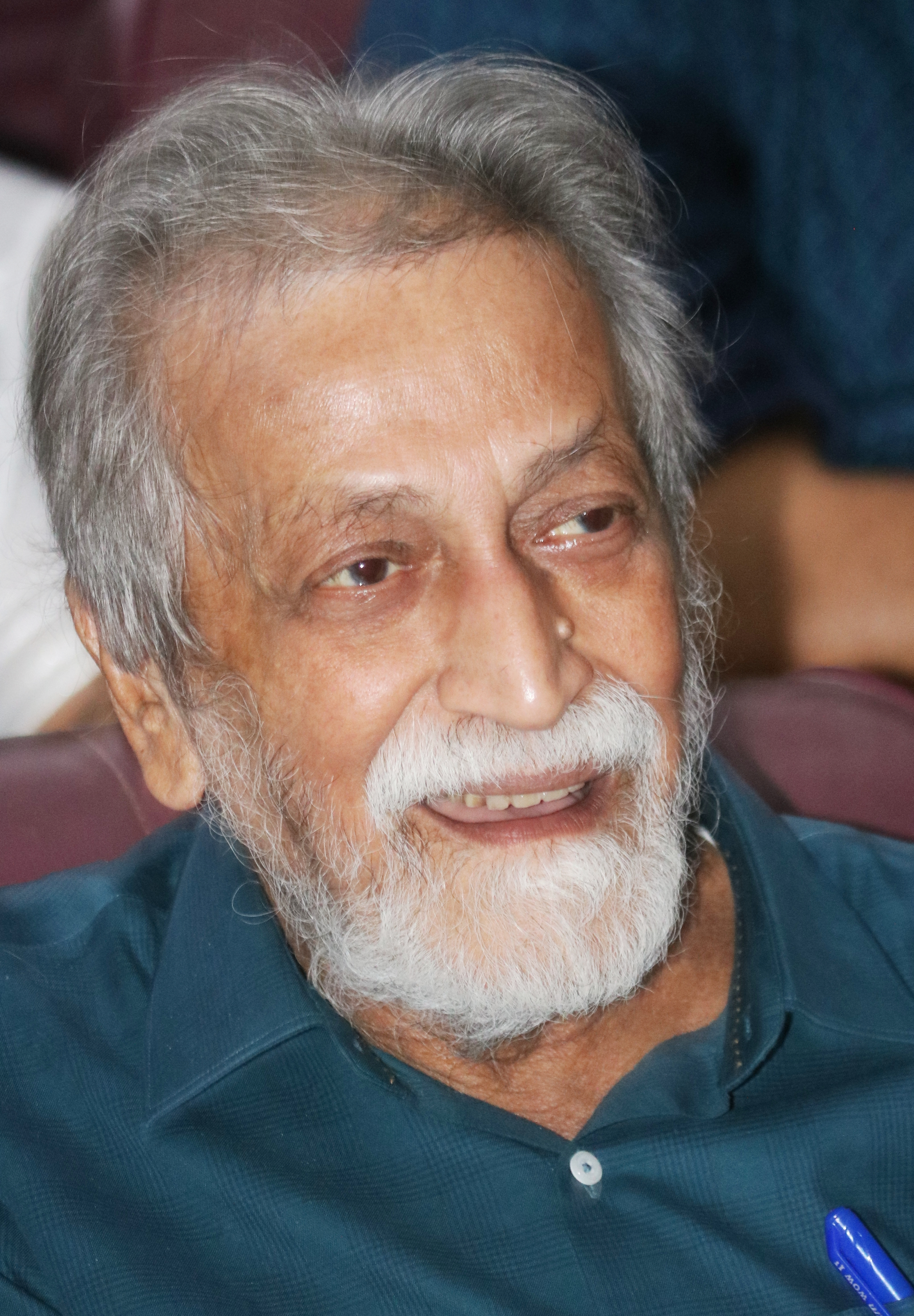
- Prabhat Patnaik in Kollam, 3 February 2025
- Born: 19 September 1945 (age 81); Jatni, Odisha, India
- Spouse: Utsa Patnaik

Academic background
- Education: St Stephen's College, Delhi; Delhi University; University of Oxford

Academic work
- Institutions: Jawaharlal Nehru University; University of Cambridge

Prabhat Patnaik (born 19 September 1945) is an Indian Marxian economist and political commentator. He taught at the Centre for Economic Studies and Planning in the School of Social Sciences at Jawaharlal Nehru University in New Delhi, from 1974 until his retirement in 2010. He was the vice-chairman of Kerala State Planning Board from June 2006 to May 2011.

== Early life and education ==
Patnaik was born on 19 September 1945 in Jatni, Odisha. His father was the communist leader and Member of the Legislative Assembly (MLA), Prananath Patnaik. Prabhat, after his early schooling in his hometown, studied at the Daly College, Indore on a Government of India Merit Scholarship. He passed his B.A. with Economics Honours from the St. Stephen's College, Delhi, ranking first in the first class. Afterwards, he went to University of Oxford in 1966 on a Rhodes Scholarship and studied at Balliol College and later at Nuffield College. He obtained his Bachelor of Philosophy and his Doctor of Philosophy degrees from Oxford.

== Career ==
Patnaik joined the Faculty of Economics and Politics of the University of Cambridge, UK in 1969 and was elected a fellow of Clare College, Cambridge. In 1974 he returned to India as an associate professor at the newly established Centre for Economic Studies and Planning (CESP) at the Jawaharlal Nehru University (JNU), New Delhi. He became a professor at the Centre in 1983 and taught there till his retirement in 2010. At the time of retirement, he held the Sukhamoy Chakravarty Chair in Planning and Development at CESP.

His specialization is macroeconomics and political economy, areas in which he has written a number of books and articles. Some of his books includes Time, Inflation and Growth (1988), Economics and Egalitarianism (1990), Whatever Happened to Imperialism and Other Essays (1995), Accumulation and Stability Under Capitalism (1997), The Retreat to Unfreedom (2003), The Value of Money (2008) and Re-envisioning Socialism (2011). He is the editor of the journal Social Scientist.

He is married to a Marxist economist Professor Utsa Patnaik. He served as the vice-chairman of the Kerala State Planning Board from June 2006 to May 2011. He was part of a four-member high-power task force of the United Nations (U.N.) to recommend reform measures for the global financial system. Chaired by Joseph Stiglitz, the other members were Belgian sociologist Francois Houtart and Ecuador's Minister for Economic Policy Pedro Paez.

== Views ==
Prabhat Patnaik is a staunch critic of both neoliberal economic policies and Hindutva, and is known as a social scientist of Marxist–Leninist persuasion. According to him, in India, the increase in economic growth has been accompanied by an increase in the magnitude of absolute poverty. The only solution is to alter the class orientation of the Indian State.

== Honours, awards and international recognition ==
In 2012, Prabhat was awarded honorary Doctor of Science in Economics from School of Oriental and African Studies at University of London. He also delivered the prestigious Prof. Baidyanath Misra Endowment Lecture of the Orissa Economics Association, in 2012. He has been selected for the 2022 Malcom Adiseshiah Award for his contributions to development studies as an outstanding economist.

== Books, research papers and journals ==
=== Books ===
- Capital and Imperialism: Theory, History, and the Present, with Utsa Patnaik, (2021) (Publisher: Monthly Review Press)
- A Theory of Imperialism, with Utsa Patnaik, (2016) (Publisher: Columbia University Press; ISBN 9780231542265)
- Excursus in History: Essays on Some Ideas of Irfan Habib (Modern Indian Thinkers) (2011) (Publisher: Tulika Books; ISBN 9788189487720)
- Marx's Capital: An Introductory Reader Essays (2011) (Publisher: Leftword Books; ISBN 9789380118000)
- Re-Envisioning Socialism (2011) (Publisher: Tulika Books; ISBN 9788189487966)
- The Value of Money (2008) (Publisher: Columbia University Press; ISBN 9780231146760)
- Retreat to Unfreedom: Essays on the Emerging World Order (2003) (Publisher: Tulika Publishers; ISBN 9788185229690)
- Accumulation and Stability under Capitalism (1997) (Publisher: Clarendon Press; ISBN 9780198288053)
- Accumulation and Stability under Capitalism (1997) (Publisher: Oxford University Press; ISBN 9780198288053)
- Economics and Egalitarianism (1991) (Publisher: Oxford University Press; ISBN 9780195624960)
- Lenin and Imperialism: An Appraisal of Theories and Contemporary Reality (1986) (Publisher: Stosius Inc/Advent Books Division; ISBN 9780861315024)

==== Others ====
- Economic Challenges for the Contemporary World: Essays in Honour of Prabhat Patnaik (2016) (Publisher: SAGE Publications Pvt. Ltd; ISBN 9789351508786)
