= V. D. Krishnaswami =

Indian archaeologist

V. D. Krishnaswami (18 January 1905 – 15 July 1970) was an Indian archaeologist who served as director of the Salar Jung Museum, Hyderabad, the Indian Museum and as deputy director-general of the Archaeological Survey of India. He is known for his pioneering work in unearthing Stone Age and megalithic sites in South India, especially those around Chennai city in the 1940s and 1950s along with Mortimer Wheeler.

== Early life ==
Born in Madras in 1905, Krishnaswami graduated with distinction from the Presidency College in 1927 and subsequently obtained an M. A. in geology. He worked as a lecturer at the Mining and Metallurgy Institute of the Banaras Hindu University till 1929.

== Career ==
In 1947, Krishnaswami published his second paper Stone Age in India in the journal Ancient India. Two years later, in 1949, Krishnaswami was appointed deputy director general of the Archaeological Survey of India. Krishnaswami was active in the survey and publishing papers until the late 1950s.

== Death ==
Krishnaswami died in Bangalore on 15 July 1970 at the age of 65.
