= Gautam Bhatia (architect) =

Indian architect, writer and artist

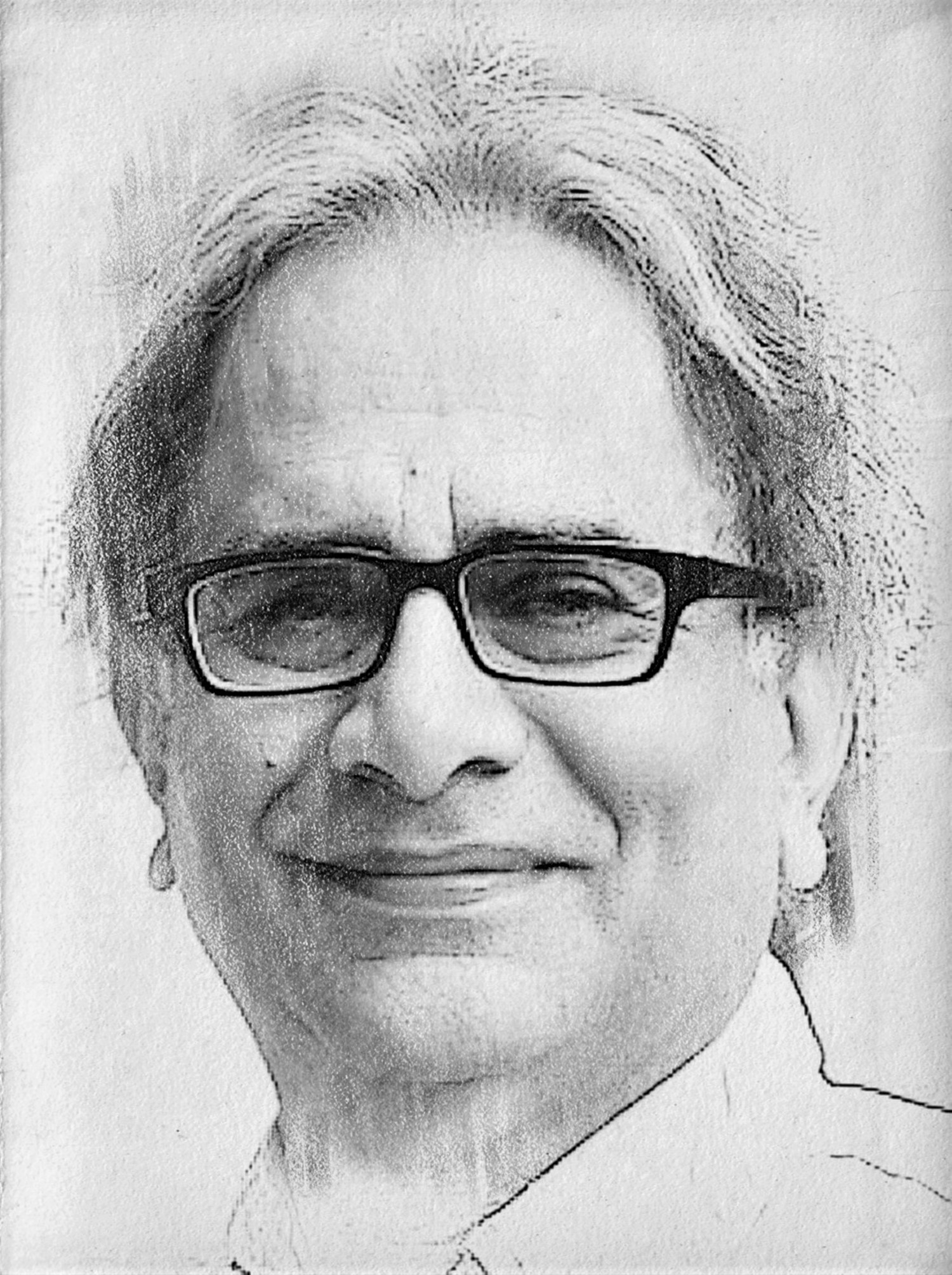
- Born: 1952 (age 73–74)
- Education: University of Pennsylvania
- Occupation: Architect

Gautam Bhatia is an Indian architect. He grew up in New Delhi and completed his master's degree in architecture at the University of Pennsylvania. Gautam Bhatia is also a writer and an artist. He has published many books on architecture and satire and his drawing and sculptures have been displayed in galleries in India and different countries.

== Education ==
Gautam Bhatia completed his bachelor's degree in fine arts in year 1974 from George Washington University, Washington, D.C., US. He is a Master of Architecture from University of Pennsylvania, Philadelphia, Pa. USA.

== Books ==
- Laurie Baker: Life, Work, and Writings, Viking, 1991,
- Punjabi Baroque, Penguin, 1994,
- Silent Spaces, Penguin, 1995,
- Malaria Dreams, Penguin, 1996,
- Punchtantra, Penguin, 1998
- A Short History of Everything, HarperCollins, 1998,
- Eternal Stone, Edited, Penguin, 1999,
- A Moment in Architecture, Tulika, 2002,
- Comic Century, Penguin, 2004,
- Whitewash, Viveka Foundation, 2007,
- Lie, A Graphic Novel, Westland Press, 2010.

== Awards and honors ==
- 2011 First Prize, National Competition, Secretariat Building, Arunachal Pradesh,
- 2007 Archi-Design Award for Recreational Architecture,
- 2003 A+D National Award for Institutional Building,
- 2003 A+D National Award for Housing,
- 2003 A+D National Award for Hotels,
- Commendation Award 2002 Competition for the Mahatma Gandhi International University, Wardha,
- 2002 JK Architect of the Year Award for Monolith Resorts,
- 2001 Habitat Award, Visual Arts Gallery, Habitat Centre,
- 1999 Inside Outside Designer of the Year Award for Devigarh Palace Hotel, Udaipur,
- 1998 JK Architect of the Year Award for the Children's Retreat,
- 1994 First Prize Architectural Competition for the CRY-Oxfam Headquarters,
- 1987 First Prize Architectural Competition for Memorial to Mahatma Gandhi,
- 1986 Second Prize Architectural Competition for the Indira Gandhi Centre for Arts,
- Received Ford Foundation grant for Desh Ki Awaaz, a collaborative arts project, 2004,
- Received grant from the Charles Wallace Trust for research on Colonial Architecture at the India Office Library, London,1997,
- Received grants from the Graham and Fulbright Foundations for research on mud architecture at the Aga Khan Program at Harvard University and MIT, 1992,
- Received Ford Foundation Grant for a Documentation of Mud Architecture,1986,
- Awarded 1977 Louis Kahn Fellowship in Architecture, Univ. of Pennsylvania,
- Awarded 1976 Dales Memorial Fellowship for Architectural Study in Europe,
- Awarded First Place Lisner Gallery Art Exhibition, Washington, D.C.
