= B. B. Lal =

Indian archaeologist and author (1921–2022)

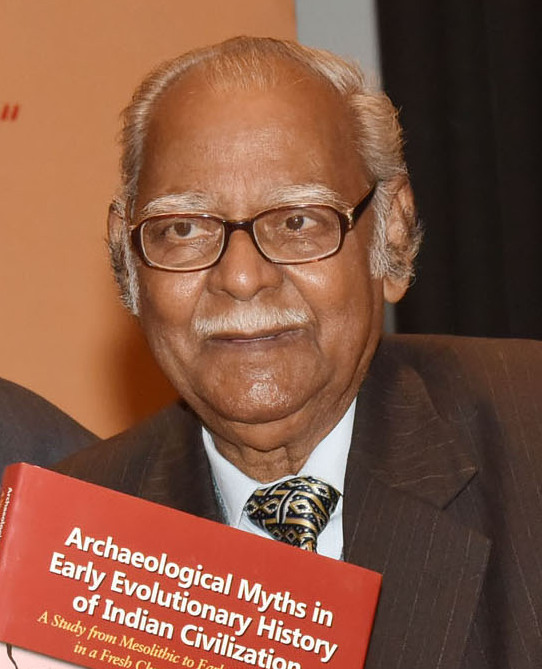
- Born: Braj Basi Lal; 2 May 1921; Jhansi, United Provinces, British India
- Died: 10 September 2022 (aged 101); New Delhi, India
- Occupations: Archaeologist, Director-General Archaeological Survey of India (1968–1972)
- Known for: Work on Indus Valley Civilization sites, Mahabharat sites, Kalibangan, Ramayana sites
- Children: 3

Braj Basi Lal (2 May 1921 – 10 September 2022) was an Indian archaeologist, Professor and author. He served as the Director General of the Archaeological Survey of India (ASI) from 1968 to 1972 and has served as Director of the Indian Institute of Advanced Studies, Shimla. Lal also served on various UNESCO committees.

His later publications have been noted and criticised for their historical revisionism, taking a controversial stance in the Ayodhya dispute, claiming to have found the remains of a columned Hindu temple beneath the subsequently destroyed Babri Masjid mosque.

He received the Padma Bhushan Award by the President of India in 2000, and was awarded India's second highest civilian award, the Padma Vibhushan, in 2021.

== Early life and education ==
Lal was born in Jhansi, Uttar Pradesh, India, on 2 May 1921. Lal obtained his master's degree in Sanskrit from Allahabad University, India.

== Career ==
After his studies, Lal developed interest in archaeology and in 1943, became a trainee in excavation under a veteran British archaeologist, Mortimer Wheeler, starting with Taxila, and later at sites such as Harappa. Lal went on to work as an archaeologist for more than fifty years. In 1968, he was appointed the Director General of the Archaeological Survey of India where he would remain until 1972. Thereafter, Lal served as Director of the Indian Institute of Advanced Studies, Shimla. The B. B. Lal Chair at the Indian Institute of Technology, Kanpur (IIT, Kanpur) has been established by his son Vrajesh Lal to encourage research in science and technology related to archaeological work. He served as Head of Department in School of Studies in Archaeology, Jiwaji University, Gwalior from 1970 to 1975.

=== Archaeological work ===
Between 1950 and 1952, Lal worked on the archaeology of sites accounted for in the Hindu epic Mahabharata, including Hastinapura, the capital city of the Kurus. He made discoveries of many Painted Grey Ware (PGW) sites in the Indo‑Gangetic Divide and upper Yamuna‑Ganga doab.

In Nubia, the Archaeological Survey of India, Lal and his team discovered Middle and Late Stone Age tools in the terraces of the river Nile near Afyeh. The team excavated a few sites at Afyeh and cemetery of C-group people, where 109 graves would be located. Lal worked on the Mesolithic site of Birbhanpur (West Bengal), Chalcolithic site of Gilund (Rajasthan) and Harappan site of Kalibangan (Rajasthan).

In 1975–76, Lal worked on the "Archaeology of Ramayana Sites" project funded by the ASI, which excavated five sites mentioned in the Hindu epic Ramayana – Ayodhya, Bharadwaj ashram, Nandigram, Chitrakoot and Shringaverapur.

Prof. B. B. Lal has published over 20 books and over 150 research papers and articles in national and international scientific journals. The British archaeologists Stuart Piggott and D.H. Gordon, writing in the 1950s, describe Copper Hoards of the Gangetic Basin (1950) and the Hastinapura Excavation Report (1954–1955), two of Lal's works published in the Journal of the Archaeological Survey of India, as "models of research and excavation reporting."

In his later publications, Lal has taken a pro-Hindutva stance and engaged in historical revisionism, taking a controversial stance in the Ayodhya dispute, and arguing in favour of the fringe (Note: No support in mainstream scholarship: Romila Thapar (2006): "there is no scholar at this time seriously arguing for the indigenous origin of Aryans".; Wendy Doniger (2017): "The opposing argument, that speakers of Indo-European languages were indigenous to the Indian subcontinent, is not supported by any reliable scholarship. It is now championed primarily by Hindu nationalists, whose religious sentiments have led them to regard the theory of Aryan migration with some asperity." (Note: Wendy Doniger (2017), "Another Great Story"", review of Asko Parpola's The Roots of Hinduism; in: Inference, International Review of Science, Volume 3, Issue 2); Girish Shahane (14 September 2019), in response to Narasimhan et al. (2019): "Hindutva activists, however, have kept the Aryan Invasion Theory alive, because it offers them the perfect strawman, 'an intentionally misrepresented proposition that is set up because it is easier to defeat than an opponent's real argument' ... The Out of India hypothesis is a desperate attempt to reconcile linguistic, archaeological and genetic evidence with Hindutva sentiment and nationalistic pride, but it cannot reverse time's arrow ... The evidence keeps crushing Hindutva ideas of history." (Note: Girish Shahane (14 September 2019), Why Hindutva supporters love to hate the discredited Aryan Invasion Theory, Scroll.in); Koenraad Elst (10 May 2016): "Of course, it is a fringe theory, at least internationally, where the Aryan Invasion Theory (AIT) is still the official paradigm. In India, though, it has the support of most archaeologists, who fail to find a trace of this Aryan influx and instead find cultural continuity."; Michael Witzel, the "indigenous Aryans" position is not scholarship in the usual sense, but an "apologetic, ultimately religious undertaking.") Indigenous Aryans point of view. (Note: See: * B. B. Lal (2005). The Homeland of the Aryans. Evidence of Rigvedic Flora and Fauna & Archaeology. Aryan Books. ISBN 8173052832. * Braj Basi Lal (2015). The Rigvedic People: 'Invaders'?/'Immigrants'? or Indigenous?. Aryan Books International. ISBN 978-81-7305-535-5.) His later works have been characterized by D. N. Jha as "a systematic abuse of archaeology," while Julian Droogan writes that Lal "has used the term blut und boden [sic], a patriotic connection between one's blood and the soil of one's homeland, in connection with supposed religious continuity in the archaeological record of the subcontinent." Ram Sharan Sharma characterized Lal's later work as driven by communalism and irrationalism, disembodied from "objective and scientific criteria." Irfan Habib exposed a clear case of pseudoarchaeology in his 1997 essay. He cited examples of cover-ups and deliberate re-interpretations B.B. Lal, among others, aimed at constructing a version of Indian history that appealed to Hindutva supporters.

=== Ayodhya dispute ===
Lal took a controversial stance in the Ayodhya dispute. Between 1975 and 1980 excavations took place at Ayodhya, with Lal writing in 1977, in the official ASI journal, that finds were "devoid of any special interest." In a seven-page preliminary report submitted to the Archaeological Survey of India (ASI) in 1989, Lal "only mentioned" that his team found "pillar bases," immediately south of the Babri mosque structure in Ayodhya. In 1990, after his retirement, he wrote in a RSS magazine (Note: Manthan, a journal of the Deendayal Research Institute, a front organization of the RSS.) that he had found the remains of a columned temple under the mosque, and "embarked on a spree of lectures all over the country propagating th[is] evidence from Ayodhya." In Lal's 2008 book, Rāma, His Historicity, Mandir and Setu: Evidence of Literature, Archaeology and Other Sciences, he writes (that):

Attached to the piers of the Babri Masjid, there were twelve stone pillars, which carried not only typical Hindu motifs and mouldings but also figures of Hindu deities. It was self-evident that these pillars were not an integral part of the Masjid, but were foreign to it.

Lal's conclusions have been contested by multiple scholars, questioning both the stratigraphic information and the kind of structure envisioned by Lal. According to Hole,

Later independent analysis of photographs of the trench in which Lal claimed to have found the pillar bases found that they were actually the remains of various walls of different, non-centemporaneous structural phases, and could not have been load-bearing structures (Mandal 2003) [...] other than one photograph, Lal has never made the notebooks and sketches of his excavations available to other scholars so that his interpretation could be tested.

Hole concludes that "the structural elements he had previously thought insignificant suddenly became temple foundations only in order to manufacture support for the nationalists' cause." (Note: In 2003 another excavation took place, in which, according to the ASI report, 50 pillars of a huge structure were found, "indicative" of a temple. K. K. Muhammad, member of the 1976–1977 excavation team, "maintains that there is enough archaeological proof of a grand temple below the Babri Mosque," stating that "more than 50 pillar bases in 17 rows were exposed," according to him remains of "a temple below the Babri Mosque and dated back to the 12th century AD." Yet, according to archaeologists Supriya Verma and Menon Shiv Sunni, who observed the excavations on behalf of the Sunni Waqf Board, "the ASI was operating with a preconceived notion of discovering the remains of a temple beneath the demolished mosque, even selectively altering the evidence to suit its hypothesis." According to Varma, "there is no archaeological evidence that there was a temple under the Babri Masjid," stating that "Underneath the Babri Masjid, there are actually older mosques." According to archaeologist D. Mandal, who was also critical of Lal's stance, although the "pillar bases" appear to be aligned, they are not "pillar bases," and belong to different periods. That is, they had never existed together at any point of time; they were not really in alignment with one another; they were not even pillar bases, but junctions of walls, bases of the load-bearing columns at the intersections of walls.) This accusation has been countered by KK Mohammed, who was a student archaeologist accompanying BB Lal. KK Mohammed claims that BB Lal didn't highlight his findings related to the issue because temple was not a big issue back then and he didn't want to provoke people. He claims, that after a decade, leftist historians, suo moto gave a statement that BB Lal hadn't found any evidence of temple. This, as per KK Mohammed, forced BB Lal to highlight his earlier findings from excavations. KK Mohammed claims that the criticism of Lal's work in Ayodhya was an attempt by leftist historians in connivance with extremist Muslim groups with a view to mislead Muslims.

=== Indigenous Aryanism ===
In his 2002 book, The Saraswati Flows On, Lal rejected the widely accepted (Note: Roni Jacobson (1 March 2018): "Five thousand years ago nomadic horseback riders from the Ukrainian steppe charged through Europe and parts of Asia. They brought with them a language that is the root of many of those spoken today—including English, Spanish, Hindi, Russian and Persian. That is the most widely accepted explanation for the origin of this ancient tongue, termed Proto-Indo-European (PIE). Recent genetic findings confirm this hypothesis.") Indo-Aryan migration theory, arguing that the Rig Vedic description of the Sarasvati River (Note: Identified with the Gagghar-Hakra river, which had dried up by 2000 BCE; see Sarasvati river#Objections.) as "overflowing" contradicts the mainstream view that the Indo-Aryan migration started at ca. 1500 BCE, after the Sarasvati River had dried up. (Note: According to Lal, in the mainstream view the Indo-Aryan migrations led to the end of the Indus Valley civilization; this is not what mainstream scholarship says.) In his book ‘The Rigvedic People: ‘Invaders’? ‘Immigrants’? or Indigenous?’, Lal argues that the Rigvedic People and the authors of the Harappan civilisation were the same, a view outside mainstream scholarship.

== Awards and honors ==
- Awarded the title of Vidyā Vāridhi by the Nava Nālandā Mahāvihāra, Nālandā University in 1979
- Awarded the title of Mahāhopādhyāya by Mithila Vishwavidyalaya in 1982
- Honorary Fellowship for Life, Asiatic Society of Bengal, 1991
- D. Litt. (Honoris Causa) by St. Petersburg Academy of Sciences, Russia, 1994
- Awarded the Padma Bhushan by the President of India in 2000
- D. Litt. (Honoris Causa) by the Deccan college, 2014
- Padma Vibhushan in 2021.

== Personal life ==
Lal lived in Delhi and had three sons. Lal died at his home in Hauz Khas on 10 September 2022, at the age of 101.

== List of publications ==
- B. B. Lal (1952). New Light on the "dark Age" of Indian History: Recent Excavations at the Hastinapura Site, Near Delhi. Illustrated London news.
- Braj Basi Lal (1955). Excavations at Hastinapura and Other Explorations [in the Upper Gangā and Sutlej Basins], 1950–52.
- Braj Basi Lal. (1956). Paleoliths from Beas and Banganga Valleys. Ancient India. No.12. pp. 58–92.
- Braj Basi Lal. (1958). Birbhanpur: Microlith site in Damodar Valley., West Bengal. Ancient India. No..14. pp 4–40.
- Braj Basi Lal. (1960). From the Megalith to the Harappan: Tracing Back the Graffiti on Pottery, Ancient India. No. 16. Pp 4–24
- Braj Basi Lal. (1962) Indian Archaeological Expedition to Qasr Ibrim (Nubia) 1961–62.
- B. B. Lal (1963). The Only Asian Expedition in Threatened Nubia: Work by an Indian Mission at Afyeh and Tumas..
- Braj Basi Lal (1964). Indian Archaeology Since Independence. Motilal Banarsidass.
- Braj Basi Lal. (1966). The Direction of Writing in the Harappan Script. Antiquity. Vol. .XL. No.175. pp 52–56.
- Braj Basi Lal. (1968). A Deluge? Which Deluge? Yet Another Facet of Copper Hoard Culture. American Anthropologist. Vol. 70. Pp 857–73.
- B. B. Lal (1972). The Copper Hoard Culture of the Ganga Valley. Heffer.
- B. B. Lal (1977). On the Most Frequently Used Sign in the Indus Script.
- B. B. Lal (1978). Weathering and Preservation of Stone Monuments Under Tropical Conditions: Some Case Histories.
- B. B. Lal (1978). Scientific Examination of Works of Art and History. Indian Association for the Study of Conservation of Cultural Property.
- Special survey reports on selected towns: Dumka, 1981.
- Braj Basi Lal. (1982). The Giant Tank of Śṛiṅgaverapura. Illustrated London News. January. P59
- Braj Basi Lal (1982). Has the Indus Script Been Deciphered?. Indian Inst. of Advanced Study.
- Frontiers of the Indus Civilization, 1984.
- B. B. Lal (1993). Excavation at Śṛiṅgaverapura: (1977–86). Director General, Archaeological Survey of India.
- Braj Basi Lal (1997). The Earliest civilization of South Asia: rise, maturity, and decline. Aryan Books International. ISBN 978-81-7305-107-4.
- Jagat Pati Joshi; D. K. Sinha; Braj Basi Lal (1997). Facets of Indian Civilization: Prehistory and rock-art, protohistory: Essays in Honour of Prof. B. B. Lal (Vol. 1). Aryan Books International. ISBN 9788173050879.
- B. B. Lal (1998). India 1947-1997: New Light on the Indus Civilization. Aryan Books International. ISBN 978-81-7305-129-6.
- Braj Basi Lal (2002). The Sarasvatī flows on: the continuity of Indian culture. Aryan Books International. ISBN 978-81-7305-202-6.
- Braj Basi Lal (2003). Excavations at Kalibangan: The Early Harappans, 1960–1969. Director General, Archaeological Survey of India.
- Braj Basi Lal. (2003). Should One Give up All Ethics for Promoting One's Theory? East and West. Vol. 53. . Nos. 1–4. pp285–88.
- A. S. Bisht; Surinder Pal Singh; B. B. Lal (2004). Studies in Art and Archaeological Conservation: Dr. B. B. Lal Commemoration Volume. Agam Kala Prakashan. ISBN 978-81-7320-059-5.
- B. B. Lal (2005). The Homeland of the Aryans. Evidence of Rigvedic Flora and Fauna & Archaeology. Aryan Books. ISBN 8173052832.
- Braj Basi Lal; R. Sengupta (2008). A Report on the Preservation of Buddhist Monuments at Bamiyan in Afghanistan. Islamic Wonders Bureau. ISBN 978-81-87763-66-6.
- B. B. Lal (2008). Rāma, His Historicity, Mandir, and Setu: Evidence of Literature, Archaeology, and Other Sciences. Aryan Books. ISBN 978-81-7305-345-0.
- B. B. Lal (2009). How Deep Are the Roots of Indian Civilization?: Archaeology Answers. Aryan Books. ISBN 978-8173053764.
- Braj Basi Lal (2011). Excavations at Bharadwaja Ashram: with a note on the exploration at Chitrakuta. Archaeological Survey of India.
- Braj Basi Lal (2011). Piecing Together: Memoirs of an Archaeologist. Aryan Books International. ISBN 978-81-7305-417-4.
- Braj Basi Lal. (2013) Historicity of the Mahabharata: Evidence of Art, Literature and Archaeology. Aryan Books International. ISBN 978-81-7305-458-7 (HB), 978-81-7305-459-4 (PB)
- Braj Basi Lal (2015). The Rigvedic People: 'Invaders'?/'Immigrants'? or Indigenous?. Aryan Books International. ISBN 978-81-7305-535-5.
- Braj Basi Lal. (2015) Excavations at Kalibangan (1961–69): The Harappans. Archaeological Survey of India.
- Braj Basi Lal. (2017a) Kauśāmbī Revisited. Aryan Books International
- Braj Basi Lal. (2017b) Testing Ancient Traditions on the Touchstone of Archaeology. Aryan Books International
- Braj Basi Lal. (2019) Agony of an Archaeologist. Aryan Books International.
- BR Mani; Rajesh Lal; Neera Misra; Vinay Kumar (2019) Felicitating a Legendary Archaeology Prof B. B. Lal. Vols. III. BR Publishing Corporation. ISBN 9789387587458 (Set of 3 Vols.)
- Braj Basi Lal. (2019). From the Mesolithic to the Mahājanapadas: The Rise of Civilisation in the Ganga Valley. Aryan Books International.

== See also ==
- Archaeology of Ayodhya

== Sources ==
=== Printed sources ===
- Ahmed, Mukhtar (2014), Ancient Pakistan – An Archaeological History: Volume IV: Harappan Civilization – Theoretical and the Abstract, Foursome Group
- Bernbeck, Reinhard; Pollock, Susan (February 1996), "Ayodhya, Archaeology, and Identity", Current Anthropology, 37 (Supplement): S139, doi:10.1086/204467, S2CID 143935761
- Bhan, Suraj (1997), "Recent Trends in Indian Archaeology", Social Scientist, 25 (1/2): 3–15, doi:10.2307/3517757, JSTOR 3517757, archived from the original on 2 February 2021
- Coningham, Robin; Young, Ruth (2015), The Archaeology of South Asia: From the Indus to Asoka, c.6500 BCE–200 CE, Cambridge University Press, ISBN 9780521846974
- Droogan, Julian (2012), Religion, Material Culture and Archaeology, A&C Black
- Hole, Brian (2016), "A Many-Cornered Thing: The Role of Heritage in Indian Nation-Building", in Jenkins, Tiffany (ed.), Political Culture, Soft Interventions and Nation Building, Routledge
- Romey, Kristin M. (2006), "Flashpoint Ayodhya", in Vitelli, Karen D.; Colwell-Chanthaphonh, Chip (eds.), Archaeological Ethics, Rowman Altamira
- Thapar, Romila (2006). India: Historical Beginnings and the Concept of the Aryan. National Book Trust. ISBN 9788123747798.
- Witzel, Michael E. J. (2001). "Autochthonous Aryans? The Evidence from Old Indian and Iranian Texts" (PDF). Electronic Journal of Vedic Studies. 7 (3): 1–115.
- Witzel, Michael (2006), "Rama's realm. Indocentric rewritings of early South Asian archaeology and history", in Fagan, Garrett G (ed.), Archaeological Fantasies: How Pseudoarchaeology Misrepresents the Past and Misleads the Public, Routledge

=== Web-sources ===
Preceded by Amalananda Ghosh	Director General of the Archaeological Survey of India; 1968–1972	Succeeded by M. N. Deshpande
