= Tulika Books =

Indian publisher of scholarly and academic books

- Status: Active
- Founded: 1995; 30 years ago
- Founder: Indira Chandrasekhar
- Country of origin: India
- Headquarters location: New Delhi
- Publication types: Books
- Nonfiction topics: Humanities, Social sciences
- Official website: tulikabooks.in

Tulika Books is an Indian publisher of scholarly and academic books in the humanities and social sciences, with a "broadly left perspective." The Chennai-based Tulika Publishers is a sister company of Tulika Books.

== History ==
Tulika Books was founded in 1995 and is based in New Delhi. It is managed by the Managing Editor Indira (née Indu) Chandrasekhar, who started her career as a copy editor with Macmillan India in the 1980s and also did some teaching in Bangalore and Delhi Universities. The authors published by Tulika include some of India's best known left intellectuals and academics.

Tulika Books is one of the founder-members of the Independent Publishers' Distribution Alternative of India and the Independent Publishing Group. In 2014, it won the Printed Book of the Year award from Publishing Next for the book Project Cinema City. The book falls into the Tulika Books' line of "art books," books on modern Indian art as well on modern Indian artists.

In 2013, Chandrasekhar protested the invitation of Narendra Modi as the chief guest of the "Romancing Print" conference. She and several other publishers withdrew from the conference, as a result of which Modi is said to have cancelled his plans to address the conference. Chandrasekhar is a member of the India Chapter of the Palestinian Campaign for the Academic and Cultural Boycott of Israel.

The former Tulika editor Sudhanva Deshpande went on to work as the managing director of the explicitly leftist publisher LeftWord Books and Tulika maintains links with LeftWord. Its books are provided on the LeftWord Book Club and Chandrasekhar serves on the editorial advisory board of LeftWord.

== Publications ==
=== Book series ===
- A People's History of India (in partnership with Aligarh Historians Society)
- Comprehensive History & Culture of Andhra Pradesh (in association with Andhra Pradesh History Congress & Potti Sreeramulu Telugu University)
- Agrarian Studies
- Labour History
- Modern Indian Thinkers (in association with Social Scientist)
- Muttukadu Papers
- India Since the 90s

=== Journals ===
- Social Scientist (in association with Indian School of Social Sciences)
- Review of Agrarian Studies (in association with the Foundation for Agrarian Studies)

=== Selected authors ===
- Amiya Kumar Bagchi
- Barnita Bagchi
- Gautam Bhatia
- Akeel Bilgrami
- Ben Fine
- Jayati Ghosh
- Irfan Habib
- Geeta Kapur
- Sashi Kumar
- A. G. Noorani
- Prabhat Patnaik
- Devi Prasad
- Ashish Rajadhyaksha
- Shereen Ratnagar
- Paritosh Sen
- Arpita Singh
- Jomo Kwame Sundaram
- Vivan Sundaram
