= Social Scientist =

Indian academic journal

- Language: English

Publication details
- History: 1972–till today
- Publisher: Indian School of Social Sciences and Tulika Books (India)

Standard abbreviations
- ISO 4: Soc. Sci. (New Delhi)

Indexing
- ISSN: 0970-0293
- LCCN: 72907319
- JSTOR: 09700293
- OCLC no.: 476250216

Links
- Journal homepage

Social Scientist is an Indian academic journal published by the Indian School of Social Sciences and Tulika Books in the areas of social sciences and humanities. The journal is based in New Delhi and has been running since 1972. It is edited by the Jawaharlal Nehru University social scientist Prabhat Patnaik. The Managing Editor is Rajendra Prasad. The journal is indexed in the International Bibliography of the Social Sciences and the Bibliography of Asian Studies.
