= Irfan Habib =

Indian historian (born 1931)

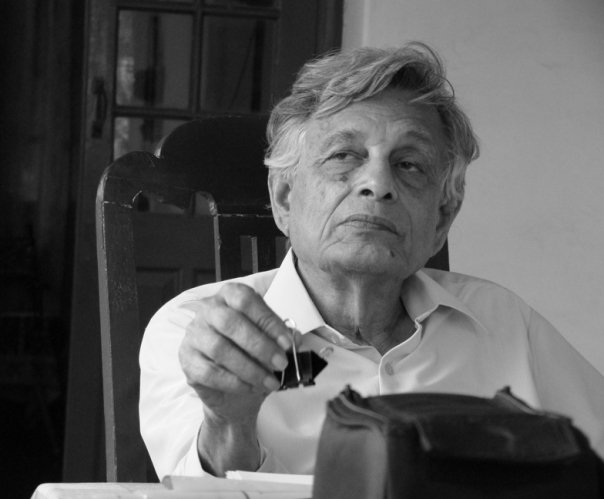
- Habib in 2011
- Born: 12 August 1931 (age 95); Baroda, Baroda State, British India (now Vadodara, Gujarat, India)
- Citizenship: India
- Spouse: Sayera Habib
- Parents: Mohammad Habib (father); Sohaila Habib (née Tyabji) (mother)
- Relatives: Abbas Tyabji (maternal grandfather); Tyabji family
- Awards: Watumull Prize (1982); Padma Bhushan (2005)

Academic background
- Education: Aligarh Muslim University; Oxford University
- Doctoral advisor: C. C. Davies

Academic work
- Discipline: History
- Sub-discipline: Economic history, medieval Indian history, historical geography, historiography
- Institutions: Aligarh Muslim University
- Notable works: The Agrarian System of Mughal India, 1556–1707

Irfan Habib (born 12 August 1931) is an Indian marxist historian. His work includes historical geography, the history of Indian technology, and the economic history of medieval India, especially the Mughal Empire. His scholarship is associated with Marxist historiography. He is Professor Emeritus at Aligarh Muslim University (AMU). Habib has written several works, including The Agrarian System of Mughal India, 1556–1707, An Atlas of the Mughal Empire, Essays in Indian History: Towards a Marxist Perception, and An Atlas of Ancient Indian History, co-authored with Faiz Habib. He has also served as general editor of the A People's History of India series.

== Early and personal life ==
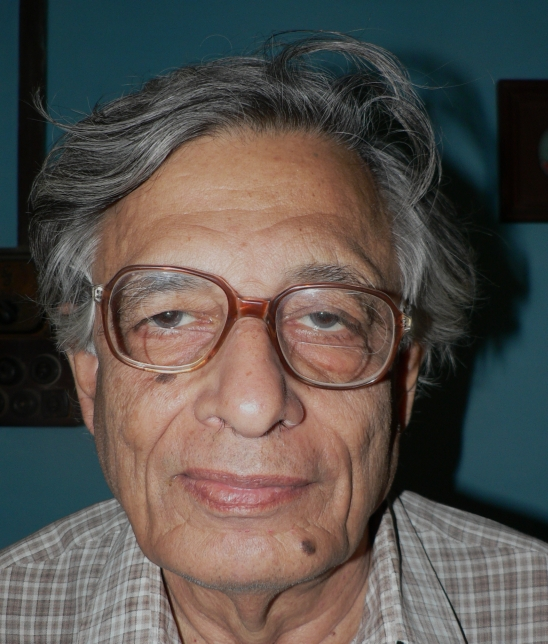
Irfan Habib, 2007

Habib was born in 1931 to Mohammad Habib and Sohaila Habib (née Tyabji). His paternal grandfather was Mohammad Naseem, a barrister and member of the Indian National Congress, and his maternal grandfather was Abbas Tyabji, Chief Justice of the High Court of Baroda State and a follower of Mahatma Gandhi. Habib's father, Mohammad Habib, was a historian and was associated with the Indian independence movement.

Habib's wife, Sayera Habib née Siddiqui, was Professor of Economics at AMU. The couple have three sons and one daughter.

== Academic ==
After obtaining his doctorate at Oxford under C. C. Davies, Habib joined the history faculty at Aligarh Muslim University. He was Professor of History at AMU from 1969 to 1991, and later became Professor Emeritus. In 1991, he delivered Oxford's Radhakrishnan Lecture. He has been an elected Corresponding Fellow of the British Royal Historical Society since 1997.

His research spans ancient Indian historical geography, the history of Indian technology, medieval administrative and economic history, colonialism, and Indian historiography. Economist Amiya Kumar Bagchi described Habib as "one of the two most prominent Marxist historians of India today" and "one of the greatest living historians of India between the twelfth and eighteenth centuries".

== Positions ==
Habib served as Coordinator and Chairman of the Centre for Advanced Studies at AMU in 1975–1977 and 1984–1994. He was Chairman of the Indian Council of Historical Research from 1986 to 1990. He served as General President of the Indian History Congress in 1981. In 2021, he was appointed an Honorary Fellow of New College, Oxford.

== Philosophical and political views ==
Habib's scholarship is associated with Marxist historiography. His book Essays in Indian History: Towards a Marxist Perception brings together essays on caste, peasantry, class struggle, colonialism, and Marxist historiography.

Habib has written about the historical value of ancient Indian texts, including the Vedas. He has argued that, although transmitted orally, the Vedas can be used as historical sources in the context of a tradition that valued faithful transmission.

Habib has been active in public debates over secularism and history education in India. He led historians at the Indian History Congress in 1998 who moved a resolution against the alleged "saffronisation" of history. He has criticised textbook revisions and public-history initiatives associated with Hindu nationalist politics.

In 2023, Habib criticised textbook revisions that removed or reduced material on Muslim rule in India, including the Mughals, and references to Muslim contributions to the Indian freedom struggle. In an interview with Al Jazeera, he said that such revisions distorted Indian history and reflected a Hindu nationalist interpretation of the past.

== Honours ==
- 1968 – Jawaharlal Nehru Fellowship, awarded for research on India during the seventeenth century.
- 1982 – Watumull Prize of the American Historical Association, jointly with Tapan Raychaudhuri, for The Cambridge Economic History of India, Volume 1.
- 2005 – Padma Bhushan, Government of India.
- 2009 – Ibn Sina Memorial Lecture, Ibn Sina Academy of Medieval Medicine and Sciences.
- 2010 – Honorary Doctor of Letters (D.Litt), University of Calicut.
- 2016 – Yash Bharti Award, Government of Uttar Pradesh.
- 2021 – Honorary Fellow, New College, Oxford.

== Selected publications ==
Books authored

- The Agrarian System of Mughal India, 1556–1707. Asia Publishing House, 1963; revised edition, Oxford University Press, 1999.
- An Atlas of the Mughal Empire: Political and Economic Maps with Detailed Notes, Bibliography, and Index. Oxford University Press, 1982.
- Essays in Indian History: Towards a Marxist Perception. Tulika Books, 1995.
- The Economic History of Medieval India: A Survey. Tulika Books, 2001.
- Medieval India: The Study of a Civilization. National Book Trust, 2008.
- People's History of India – Part 1: Prehistory. Aligarh Historians Society and Tulika Books, 2001.
- People's History of India – Part 2: The Indus Civilization. Aligarh Historians Society and Tulika Books, 2002.
- A People's History of India – Vol. 3: The Vedic Age. With Vijay Kumar Thakur. Aligarh Historians Society and Tulika Books, 2003.
- A People's History of India – Vol. 4/5: Mauryan India. With Vivekanand Jha. Aligarh Historians Society and Tulika Books, 2004.
- A People's History of India – Vol. 6: Post-Mauryan India, 200 BC – AD 300. Tulika Books, 2013.
- A People's History of India – Vol. 14: Economic History of India, AD 1206–1526, The Period of the Delhi Sultanate and the Vijayanagara Empire. Tulika Books, 2017.
- A People's History of India – Vol. 20: Technology in Medieval India, c. 650–1750. Aligarh Historians Society and Tulika Books, 2016.
- A People's History of India – Vol. 25: Indian Economy Under Early British Rule, 1757–1857. Tulika Books, 2014.
- A People's History of India – Vol. 28: Indian Economy, 1858–1914. Aligarh Historians Society and Tulika Books, 2006.
- A People's History of India – Vol. 30: The National Movement: Origins and Early Phase to 1918. Tulika Books, 2018.
- A People's History of India – Vol. 31: The National Movement, Part 2: The Struggle for Freedom, 1919–1947. Tulika Books, 2020.
- A People's History of India – Vol. 36: Man and Environment. Tulika Books, 2015.
- The National Movement: Studies in Ideology & History. Tulika Books, 2011.
- An Atlas of Ancient Indian History. With Faiz Habib. Oxford University Press, 2012.

Books edited

- The Cambridge Economic History of India, Volume I: 1200–1750. Co-edited with Tapan Raychaudhuri.
- UNESCO History of Civilizations of Central Asia, Vol. 5: Development in Contrast: From the Sixteenth to the Mid-Nineteenth Century. Co-edited with Chahryar Adle and K. M. Baikapov.
- UNESCO History of Humanity, Vol. 4: From the Seventh to the Sixteenth Century.
- UNESCO History of Humanity, Vol. 5: From the Sixteenth to the Eighteenth Century.
- The Growth of Civilizations in India and Iran.
- Sikh History from Persian Sources: Translations of Major Texts. With J. S. Grewal. Indian History Congress and Tulika Books, 2011.
- Akbar and His India.
- India: Studies in the History of an Idea.
- State and Diplomacy under Tipu Sultan.
- Confronting Colonialism.
- Medieval India – 1.
- A World to Win: Essays on the Communist Manifesto. Co-edited with Aijaz Ahmad and Prakash Karat.
