= Ghaznavid invasions of Kannauj =

Ghaznavid invasion of Kannauj

Ghaznavid invasion of Kannauj
- Part of Ghaznavid campaigns in India
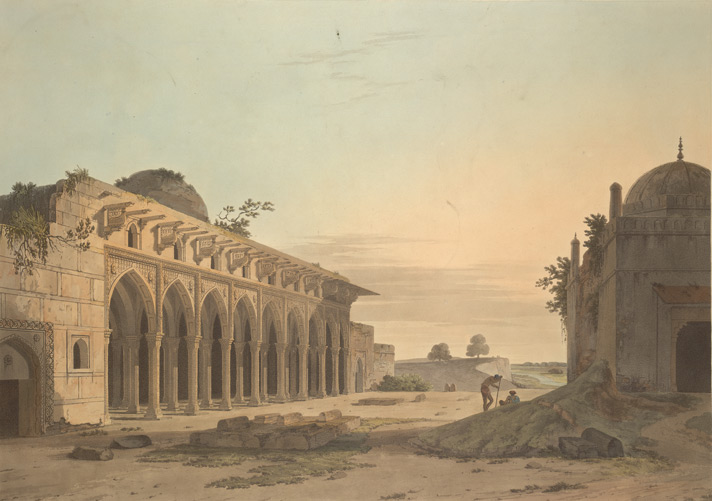
- Painting of Kannauj by Thomas Daniell c. 1802
| Date | 20 December 1018 |
| Location | Kannauj 27.07°N 79.92°E |
| Result | Ghaznavid victory |

Belligerents
| Ghaznavid Empire | Pratihara dynasty |

Commanders and leaders
| Mahmud of Ghazni | Rajyapala (surrendered) |

Strength
| 100,000 cavalry or 11,000 regulars 20,000 infantry or volunteers. (Note: 100,000 cavalry and 20,000 infantry according to Firishta 11,000 regulars according to Sibt ibn al-Jawzi and 20,000 volunteers as per Muhammad ibn Abd al-Jabbar al-Utbi) | Unknown |

Casualties and losses
| Unknown | Unknown |
- Kannauj Kannauj (Uttar Pradesh)

The Ghaznavid invasion of Kannauj or the siege of Kannauj in 1018 was a military campaign conducted by Mahmud of Ghazni, the then ruler of the Ghaznavid Empire, against the Pratihara dynasty. During this siege, the Pratihara ruler, Rajyapala, eventually surrendered to Mahmud of Ghazni, thereby accepting nominal suzerainty under his rule. This event marked the decline of the Pratihara dynasty's power. In the aftermath of his surrender to Mahmud, Rajyapala met his demise at the hands of the Chandela ruler, Vidhyadara, for capitulating to the Ghaznavid conqueror.

After the decline of the Pratihara dynasty, the Rashtrakutas rose to prominence in Kannauj. Their fourth ruler, Gopala, was defeated and Kannauj was plundered by the Ghaznavid governor of Punjab named Mahmud who was the son of Ibrahim of Ghazni. Subsequently, Kannauj came under the control of the Gahadavala dynasty, whose ruler, Madanapala, was defeated by Masud III and imprisoned by the Ghaznavids. He was later released upon payment of ransom by his son, Govindachandra.

== Background ==
Mahmud of Ghazni, as the ruler of the Ghaznavid Empire, conducted a series of invasions into India. One of his notable campaigns was the invasion of Kannauj, which was the capital of the Pratihara dynasty. Prior to reaching North India, he first defeated the Hindu Shahis of Afghanistan and various other regional monarchs in northern India.

In 1018, Mahmud of Ghazni, led an expedition from Ghazni with the aim of capturing Kannauj from the Pratihara dynasty. Kannauj held strategic significance, being at the crossroads of power for the Pala dynasty, the Pratihara dynasty, and the Rashtrakutas. These dynasties had been vying for control of Kannauj, but in 1018, the ruler of the Pratihara dynasty, Rajyapala, held dominion over the city.

The Kannauj being the political centre of three Kingdoms.

On his journey to Kannauj, Mahmud captured Bulandshahr and Mahaban after defeating their rulers. He also entered Mathura and looted its vicinity.

== The invasion ==
In January 1019, Mahmud of Ghazni reached Kannauj. Surprisingly, Rajyapala, the ruler of Kannauj, offered no resistance and fled his capital by crossing the Ganga River, ultimately seeking refuge in Bari. In his absence, Ghaznavid forces ransacked Kannauj, seizing a substantial amount of plunder.

Ultimately, Rajyapala, after fleeing to Bari, decided to surrender to Mahmud, acknowledging the nominal suzerainty of the Ghaznavids. The seven forts of Kannauj fell in one day to the Ghaznavids. Following this development, Mahmud engaged in other campaigns within India after successfully asserting control over Kannauj.

== Aftermath ==
Rajyapala's surrender to the Ghaznavids had consequences, leading to some turn of events. The Chandela ruler Vidyadhara, along with his allies, took matters into their own hands and killed Rajyapala. Meanwhile, Mahmud of Ghazni continued his campaign, capturing the fort at Munjhawan, a stronghold held by Brahmins. These actions effectively marked the end of the Pratihara dynasty. After Rajyapala's demise, his successors persisted in maintaining control over certain territories by relocating their capital to Bari, near Kannauj, until their domain was eventually conquered by the Gahadavala Rajputs.

=== Later campaigns ===
Following Mahmud's second campaign in the Gangetic valley, a Rashtrakuta prince named Chandra wrested the control of Kannauj in 1027 from the Pratiharas. Chandra was succeeded by his son Vigrahapala, who was in turn succeeded by his son Bhuvanapala. During their reigns, Kannauj was plundered by the Chalukya armies of Someshwara I led by the Yuvaraja future king Vikramaditya VI and an expeditionary force sent by Virarajendra Chola. The fourth ruler in his lineage was a king named Gopala, son of Bhuvanapala.

Between 1086 and 1090, Mahmud, the son of Ibrahim of Ghazni and the governor of Punjab under the Ghaznavid rule, launched another invasion of Kannauj. He plundered both Kannauj and Kalinjar, and also attacked Ujjain. During this campaign, he defeated Gopala, then formed an alliance with the Gahadavala king named Chandradeva. After Mahmud's departure from northern India following his victory over Gopala, Chandradeva seized the throne of Kannauj from Gopala. The Gahadavala king levied a tax named Turushkadanda on the people to make annual tribute payments to the Sultans of Ghazni. It was likely to ensure the consistent payment of this tribute that Muslim expeditions were periodically launched against Northern India.

Later, Madanapala, who ruled as the Gahadavala (r. 1100–1114) and was the son of Chandradeva, was defeated by the Ghaznavid ruler Masud III (r. 1099–1115) and taken as a prisoner of war. He was released after his son Govindachandra (r. 1114–1154), paid his ransom, as indicated by the Gahadavala inscriptions.

== Bibliography ==
- Majumdar, R. C. (1966). History and Culture of Indian People - 5 Struggle For Empire. Vol. V (2nd ed.). Bombay: Bharatiya Vidya Bhavan.
- Nazim, Muhammad (1971). The Life and Times Of Sultan Mahmud Of Ghazna. Delhi., Munshiram Manoharlal.
- Barua, Pradeep (2005-01-01). The State at War in South Asia. U of Nebraska Press. ISBN 978-0-8032-1344-9.
