= Vishnu Hari inscription =

Sanskrit inscription

The Vishnu Hari inscription (or Hari-Vishnu inscription) is the name given to a Sanskrit language inscription found in the Uttar Pradesh state of India. It records the construction of a temple by Anayachandra, a feudatory of the king named Govindachandra, and also contains a eulogy of Anayachandra's dynasty. Its date portion is missing, and its authenticity has been a matter of controversy.

The inscription is said to have been found among the debris of the Babri mosque in Ayodhya when a group of Hindu activists demolished the mosque in 1992. They had long claimed that the mosque was constructed after destroying a Hindu temple marking the birthplace of the Hindu deity Rama (an incarnation of Vishnu). Those who believe that a temple existed at the Babri mosque site consider the inscription as evidence of their claim, identifying the king as the 12th century Gahadavala king Govindachandra.

Others have claimed that the inscription was planted at the Babri mosque site by Hindu activists. According to one theory, the inscription is actually the Treta Ka Thakur inscription, which was found at another mosque in Ayodhya by Alois Anton Führer in the 19th century and later transferred to the Lucknow State Museum. The theory posits that it was brought to Ayodhya from Lucknow museum, and planted at the Babri mosque site. Yet another theory claims that it is a 17th-century inscription that was later planted at the site.

== Physical features ==
The Vishnu-Hari inscription contains 20 lines with several Sanskrit language verses. It is written in Nagari script, inscribed on a 1.10 m x 0.56 m sandstone. It is said to have been embedded in the lower portion of a wall of the demolished Babri mosque.

== Language ==
The language of the inscription is Sanskrit. It has 29 verses, which feature the following metres:

1. Possibly Shardula-vikridita
2. Shardula-vikridita
3. Unknown
4. Unknown
5. Vasanta-tilaka
6. Vasanta-tilaka
7. Vasanta-tilaka
8. Shikharini
9. Upajati
10. Shardula-vikridita
11. Anushtup
12. Harini
13. Shardula-vikridita
14. Malini
15. Malini
16. Rathoddhata
17. Vasanta-tilaka
18. Anushtup
19. Vasanta-tilaka
20. Shardula-vikridita
21. Shardula-vikridita
22. Upajati
23. Upajati
24. Vasanta-tilaka
25. Vasanta-tilaka
26. Anushtup
27. Shardula-vikridita
28. Vasanta-tilaka
29. Upajati

== Content ==
Archaeological Survey of India epigraphists K. V. Ramesh and M. N. Katti have translated the inscription based on its widely circulated photographs. Kishore Kunal (2016) came up with another translation, with support from the Sanskrit scholars Govind Jha and Bhavanath Jha.

The inscription starts with obeisance to gods, and then describes a glorious dynasty. Verses 6-18 narrate the heroic exploits of the dynasty's members including Karna or Mame, Sallakshana, and Alhana. According to Kishore Kunal, these appear to be Gahadavala subordinates who preceded Anayachandra as governors of the Saketa mandala (region). Verses 19-21 describe the activities of Alhana's successor Anayachandra, including the construction of a Vishnu-Hari temple at Ayodhya. The rest of the verses describe his successor Ayushchandra.

=== Verse 1: Obeisance to Shiva ===
The only surviving portion of the first verse is "Namah shiva[ya]", which means "Obeisance to Shiva". The damaged portion has enough space to accommodate a verse in the Shardulavikridita metre. It presumably contained a verse praising Shiva.

=== Verse 2: Obeisance to Vamana ===
This verse praises Vishnu's dwarf avatar Vamana, calling him as Trivikrama (the one who strode over the three worlds in three steps). It describes him as the embodiment of the sixteen branches of knowledge (mahavidya).

According to K. V. Ramesh's translation, the next part of the verse states that Vamana holds the universe in his palm "like (holding) the Moon, whose kulagiri, whose falling rocks (while striking one another) create noise had, out of arrogance...". According to Ramesh, Kulagiri here refers to the seven great mountain ranges described in the ancient Indian literature: Mahendra, Malaya, Sahya, Śuktimat, Riksha, Vindhya, and Páripátra.

According to Kishore Kunal's translation the verse states that Vamana, in his palm, holds the universe "which gets distributed by cloud Samvarta and Pramad, as they strike against the rocks of Kulagiri and create echo".

=== Verses 3-4: Praise of the dynasty ===
The third verse cannot be read clearly. K. V. Ramesh translated the surviving portion as "The illustrious Bhargava (Parashurama)... an ornament of the earth... like insects... with firm hands upraised... having increased, events brought into existence, barren faces...". K. V. Ramesh's reading includes the word "sanklimiriva", which is not a familiar Sanskrit word. According to Kishore Kunal, this is a misreading: the actual word appears to be "panktibhirinas".

Kishore Kunal reconstructed the verse as describing a dynasty praised as "ornament of the world", and counting Bhargava among its long line of powerful kings. According to this interpretation, the verse further states that blessings were showered on this dynasty by "the Sun and a galaxy of kings". It ends with the claim that a number of heroes, who were always eager to help others, were born in this dynasty.

Verse 4 describes the aforementioned dynasty as determined to protect (or resurrect) the Kshatriyas who had been weakened in the battles against Bhargava (Parashurama).

This verse refers to the tandava (violent dance) of the god Shiva, who is described as the Lord of the goddess Chandi. According to K. V. Ramesh's interpretation, during this dance, "from the rocking head jewel... [incomplete] genuine reputations which emanated from the opening in the skull-shaped spherical half of the universe". Kishore Kunal's reconstruction states that the fame of the dynasty's members emanated through the upper cavity in the skull-shaped world egg (brahmanda), which was "placed like the gem on the matted hair of the dancing Shiva".

=== Verse 5: Apratima-vikrama ===
The first line of verse 5 contains the expression vaṃśyan-tad-eva-kulam. K. V. Ramesh has translated the word "kulam" as "dynasty" or "family". According to his translation, the first line of the verse states that the noble family (the aforementioned dynasty) was "the birthplace of valour" which had erased the sufferings of the others (i.e. the other Kshatriya clans).

Kishore Kunal rejects this translation as inaccurate, because the preceding word "vaṃśa" also means "family" or "dynasty". Here, the word "kulam" refers to the residence of the family. This second meaning of the word is attested in Sanskrit dictionaries, ancient Sanskrit thesauruses such as Amarakosha and Haimakosha, as well as ancient texts such as Raghuvaṃśa. According to Kishore Kunal's translation, the first line describes the place of the inscription as "the abode of the dynasty which had succeeded in ending all anxiety" (about Parashurama's war). It further describes the place as the birthplace of apratima-vikrama ("the man with unmatched valour"). Kishore Kunal identifies the man described in this phrase as Rama, and the place of the inscription as his birthplace (janmabhoomi). According to Ramayana, Rama had forced Parashurama to retreat to Mahendragiri after his marriage with Sita. Also, Rama has been given similar epithets in other texts: for example, in Rama-raksha-stotram, he has been called Aprameya-vikrama; in the Ramayana (Kishkindha 11.93), he has been called Vikrama-vare ("first in heroic worth").

K. V. Ramesh reads an expression in the second line as Mame-ऽ-janiṣṭa. Based on this reading, he interprets the expression to mean that the hero referred to in this expression was named "Mame". This hero was "the abode of thousands of perfect and valorous deeds", and "the utmost favourite of the world".

Kishore Kunal reads this expression as ma-no-janiṣṭa ("may not generate"). In the inscription, the two letters preceding "no" (Ramesh's "me") are "ma" (म). According to Kishore Kunal, a comparison of these three letters makes it clear that the third letter is "no", not "ma". Based on this reading, Kishore Kunal translates the line as: "Here resides the person who is illuminous with glory on account of thousands of valorous deeds. He may not generate greed in us even for the most sought after wealth by the world."

=== Verses 6-7: Karna or Mame ===
The verse describes a hero as praying daily to overcome his desire for material wealth and sensual pleasures. The hero is described by the epithet dinesh-vatsa ("the son of the Sun"), a synonym of "Karna", which is a common Sanskrit given name. According to K. V Ramesh, this expression refers to the king "Mame" described in the previous verse. According to Kishore Kunal, it refers to another king whose name was Karna.

The verse states that the hero described in the previous verse fought sportive battles. As a result of these battles, the women of the rival Meda and Bhilla tribes had to take refuge in the forests. There, the thorny trees wrote on (scratched) their breasts, hips and loins, as if imitating amorous activities.

=== Verses 8-14: Sallakshana ===
Verse 8 describes the transfer of power from the aforementioned hero to his son Sallakshana. It is said that the heroic father first sent his fame to the heaven. When he himself wished to go to heaven, he gave his throne and his wealth to his son Sallakshana, just like the Sun gives his lustre to the Fire.

Verse 9 eulogizes Sallakshana, stating that he acquired super-human valour. According to K. V. Ramesh's translation, this happened because of "some unknown power of the gift of that realm, which had no bounds and was other-worldly". According to Kishore Kunal's translation, Sallakshana's "boundless glory was beyond anybody's tolerance", as this was because of "the power of that gift" (the bequeathal from his father).

Verse 10 states that Sallakshana's hand was a sword, his arm was his great army, and his fame was always palatable, just like lavish delicacies. (K. V. Ramesh translates the first part as "the sword was at the tip of his fingers"). The verse further declares that these personal instruments allowed him to spread an empire without obstructions or worries, even without inheriting a kingdom ("even without a kingdom to rule", according to Ramesh).

Verse 11 states that Sallakshana could fight battles for long durations, holding his ruthless sword which quickly ended the lives (of his enemies).

Verse 12 states that Sallakshana's eulogies were sung in the tranquil surroundings of the Malaya Mountains, on the banks of the heavenly Ganga river, at the Himalayan cave-entrances and the cave residences of the hunter-tribes. According to Ramesh's translation, these eulogies were first composed by "the semi-divine beings moving about in the skies", and sung by "accomplished womenfolk". According to Kishore Kunal's translation, the eulogies were first composed by the Siddhas (accomplished spiritual masters), and sung by "the band of the wives of the air travellers" (the apsaras).

Verse 13 boasts that on the advice of the elders, the divine damsels sculpted his images and worshipped his arms to get (matching) husbands. Such worship took place in several regions, including the Himalayan terrains, the pristine Malaya Mountains, and the banks of the heavenly Ganga river.

Verse 14 has multiple interpretations. K. V. Ramesh read a word used to describe Sallakshana as ejyagva, but this word has no meaning. Kishore Kunal read this word as rajyaddār ("one who has pleasing wives"). Ramesh translated the first part of the verse as "He who is to be offered oblations... by the beautiful for the realization of their desires... himself by the worlds". Kishore Kunal reconstructs this part to mean that Sallakshana "deserved oblations from handsome persons who concealed themselves from the world to oobtain desired things". The last part of the verse describes Sallakshana's residence as full of wealth and comforts, and where many sing his glory.

=== Verses 15-17: Alhana ===
Verse 15 states that when Sallakshana started enjoying the company of the heavenly damsels (i.e. died), his son succeeded him. This son looked like his father, was wise and free from sins, and pleased his excited subjects.

Verse 16 names the son as Alhana, describing him as beloved of the good people and like a sharp saw to the warmongers. It states that Alhana "retrieved the splendour of the habitually fickle-minded Goddess" using fair means.

Verse 17 describes Alhana as an extraordinary man, who melted away the long-accumulated arrogance of his enemies, when he confronted them. It further states that his mere look uncovered the cloaks of good and bad deeds in people.

Verse 18 boasts that Alhana destroyed the manliness (of his enemies) and made the fearful effeminate. The people could not believe that his reputation dwarfed the lofty mountains.

=== Verse 19-20: Meghasuta-Anayachandra ===
The next two verses describe a feudatory who became the ruler of Saketa-mandala (the region around Ayodhya). According to K. V. Ramesh, this person was Meghasuta, who was a nephew of Alhana, and superseded a man named Anayachandra. Kishore Kunal rejects this translation, pointing out that no ruler named Anayachandra has been described in the preceding verses. According to him, Alhana's successor was Anayachandra, who was a son of Alhana's brother Megha (Megha-suta means "son of Megha"). The name "Anayachandra" can be interpreted as "the moon amongst darkness generated by injustice".

Verse 19 states that Alhana's successor became the ruler of Saketa-mandala (the region around Ayodhya). This happened by the grace of Govindachandra, the Lord of the Earth.

Verse 20 describes the battle prowess of Alhana's successor. According to K. V. Ramesh's translation, he "put an end to the arrogant warriors who were dancing in unrestrained frenzy in the battles constantly fought by him". According to Kishore Kunal, he "used to cut the neck of his frenzied enemies in his constant battles", and dispelled arrogant warriors. The verse states that the ruler provided a large army (to his people), and mentions the Kalpavriksha (a mythological wish-fulfilling tree). K. V. Ramesh's translation reads that this army was "replete with (soldiers comparable to) the wish-fulfilling trees". According to Kishore Kunal, the army "surpassed the pride of everlasting helpfulness (friendship) of a Kalpa-tree".

=== Verse 21: Construction of the temple ===
Verse 21 states that the aforementioned ruler (Anayachandra or Meghasuta) erected the temple of Vishnu-Hari to find the easiest way to cross over "the ocean of worldly attachments" (i.e. attain moksha or salvation). The temple was built using blocks of large sculpted stones: no preceding king had built a temple on this scale. The shikhara (spire) of the temple was adorned with a golden kalasha (cupola).

Those who oppose the claim about the existence of a Rama temple at the Babri mosque site point out that the verse does not talk about the construction of a Rama temple. Historian Irfan Habib notes that the inscription begins with an invocation to Shiva: Based on this, Habib concludes that the temple mentioned in the inscription was a Shiva temple. Archaeologist Sita Ram Roy (1996) argues that the term mandira mentioned in the inscription does not refer to a temple at all, but to the mansion of a king named "Vishnu Hari". Ramesh disputed Roy's assertion in his deposition before the Allahabad High Court.

Historians Sita Ram Roy and Ram Sharan Sharma argue that the term "Vishnu-Hari" does not appear in the text Vishnu sahasranama, which lists a thousand names of Vishnu (although "Vishnu" and "Hari" appear separately as the deity's name). Meenakshi Jain notes that Ayodhya Mahatmya mentions "Vishnu Har" as one of the seven representations of Vishnu on the banks of the Sarayu river.

Kishore Kunal, based on his interpretation of Verse 5 and Verse 27 (which refers to Ravana), argues that the temple described in the inscription was a Rama temple constructed by Anayachandra, a feudatory of the Gahadavala king Govindachandra. According to him, the temple deity is called "Vishnu-Hari" in this verse for poetic effect: "Vishnu" alliterates with the preceding word Vyuhai, while "Hari" alliterates with the succeeding word Hiranya. Kishore mentions that several texts composed around the 10th century mention Rama as Vishnu and Hari, presenting the Agastya Samhita as an example.

=== Verses 22-29: Ayushchandra ===
Verse 22 names the next feudatory ruler as Ayushchandra, the son of Alhana. It states that Anayachandra's shoulders were "tireless shoulders were like safety latches" for the stability of Govindachandra's kingdom. (According to K. V. Ramesh's reading, this expression refers to Alhana, not Ayushchandra.)

Verse 23 praises Ayushchandra as a great poet, stating that the great poets could not find his match in Sahasanka or Shudraka. It further boasts that others feared Ayushchandra: the only one who dared draw the bowstring in his presence was Kamadeva, the god of love. According to Ajay Mitra Shastri's interpretation, Ayushchandra was the composer of the inscription.

Verse 24 continues to applaud Ayushchandra. According to K. V. Ramesh, it states Ayushchandra "was of good conduct and abhorred strife". Kishore Kunal translates this part to state that Ayushchandra "pacified dissension through his righteous conduct". The verse states that the city of Ayodhya was home to "towering abodes, intellectuals and temples". It further states that while residing at Ayodhya, Ayushchandra constructed "thousands of wells, tanks, rest-houses and ponds" in Saketa-mandala (the province of Ayodhya). According to Kishore Kunal, this verse proves that Ayodhya had "many grand temples" before the Muslim conquest.

Verse 25 states that damsels sang praises of Ayushchandra. K. V. Ramesh's translation states that these damsels were "as attractive as the female musk-deer and does", and sang about Ayushchandra's fame as they rested on the "cool surfaces of the Himalayan rocks". Kishore Kunal's translation states that damsels sang of Ayushchandra's praises to prevent their husbands from falling asleep, as they rested "on beds as spotless as the wide surface of a golden mountain"; this fame of Ayushchandra was "very pleasant to the ears of the young musk-deer".

Verse 26 praises the splendid physique and gentle demeanour of Ayushchandra, stating that he was a source of joy to good people, just like the holy city of Kashi was a source of salvation for them.

Verse 27 compares Ayushchandra to the four avatars of Vishnu:

- the one who separated the demon Hiranyakashipu from his skeleton (Narasimha)
- the one who subdued the demon Banasura in the battle (Krishna)
- the one who suppressed the arms of the demon Bali (Vamana)
- the one who performed many valorous deeds and killed the evil ten-headed demon (Rama)

Verse 28 states that the king, with his fierce arms, annihilated the fear caused by the westerners (pashchatyas). Ajay Mitra Shastri, K. V. Ramesh and some others identify these "westerners" as Ghaznavid Muslim invaders, but others such as A. G. Noorani believe that no such conclusion can be drawn from this verse. Irfan Habib argued that the term "westerners" could refer to the "Rashtrakutas of Kannauj and Badaun", the neighbours of the Gahadavalas. The verse is incomplete; Kishore Kunal reconstructs its second line as "The brilliance of the mighty great ruler (spreads) in the east and west like a festive occasion."

Verse 29 states that the illustrious Ayushchandra became world-famous because of his subjects' acts of merit (Punya).

== Identification ==
=== Identification as the Rama temple inscription ===
Several historians consider the Vishnu-Hari inscription (along with other evidence) as the proof that the Babri Masjid was erected over the remains of a Hindu temple; these include M. G. S. Narayanan, Ajay Mitra Shastri, and Meenakshi Jain. Indologist Hans T. Bakker has stated that there was a Vishnu Hari temple at the Chakratirtha ghat in Ayodhya in the twelfth century. Four other temples from this period included a Harismriti temple at the Gopratara ghat, Chandra Hari temple on the west side of the Svargadwara ghat, Dharma Hari temple on the east side of the Svargadwara ghat, and a Vishnu temple at the Ram Janmabhoomi site. One of these temples was swept away by the Sarayu river, the fate of another (Harismiriti temple) is unknown, but the other three were replaced by mosques, including the temple at the Janmabhoomi, according to Bakker.

=== Identification as Treta Ka Thakur inscription ===
Some scholars such as Irfan Habib have alleged that the Vishnu-Hari inscription was brought to Ayodhya from the Lucknow State Museum and planted at the Babri mosque site. Their theory states that the Vishnu-Hari inscription is actually the Treta Ka Thakur inscription, which was found by Alois Anton Führer in the 19th century.

The Treta Ka Thakur inscription is mentioned as "Inscription No XLIV" in Führer's 1899 book The Sharqi Architecture of Jaunpur (1899). It was discovered in the ruins of the Treta Ka Thakur mosque in Ayodhya. Führer describes it as a 20-line sandstone inscription, broken off at both the ends, and also fragmented into two parts at the middle. According to his book, it was dated 1184 CE (1241 VS), and was issued during the reign of Jayachandra (a grandson of Govindachandra). Führer mentions that the inscription praises Jayachandra for building a Vishnu temple. According to Führer, the sandstone slab containing the inscription originally belonged to the Vishnu temple, and was later used for building the Treta Ka Thakur mosque commissioned by the Mughal emperor Aurangzeb. (The term Treta Ka Thakur literally means "the lord of Treta Yuga", that is, Rama.) Führer's book states that inscription was kept at the Faizabad Local Museum. The inscription was never published in the Epigraphia Indica or any other text.

Führer's Treta Ka Thakur inscription is said to have been transferred from Faizabad to the Lucknow Museum, where it was marked as Inscription No. 53.4. The 1950-54 Annual Report of the Lucknow Museum describes Inscription No. 53.4 as a 20-line sandstone inscription measuring 2'4" x 10.5". According to the Museum records, the inscription was obtained from Faizabad in 1953. The Lucknow Museum register dates the inscription No. 53.4 to the 10th century, while Führer's inscription was dated 1184 CE. According to the Lucknow Museum officials, the registry entries were based on "general nature of the inscription", not on its actual reading. This explains the discrepancy in the dates.

After the mosque's demolition, allegations arose that the Vishnu-Hari inscription was actually Führer's inscription: it had been brought to Ayodhya from the Lucknow Museum, where it had been replaced with another inscription. In 1994, Varanasi-based scholar Jahnavi Shekhar Roy visited the Lucknow State Museum, and made a copy of the purported Inscription No. 53.4 kept there. He concluded that it was not the inscription described in Führer's 1899 book. He wrote that the Inscription No. 53.4 at Lucknow did not mention a temple or the king Jayachandra. Its two ends were not missing, unlike Führer's inscription, which is described as "broken off at either end".

In 2003, scholar Pushpa Prasad wrote an article describing the Lucknow Museum's Inscription No. 53.4 in Proceedings Of The Indian History Congress, 2003. Citing palaeographic grounds, she claimed that its two fragments originate from two different epigraphs: the top one records a Gahadavala land grant, and the bottom one mentions a Chandela invocation to a deity. According to her, the handwritings on two fragments are from two different scribes. Moreover, the letters in the upper fragment are smaller in size, compared to the letters on the upper fragment.

Based on the articles by Roy and Prasad, a section of scholars alleged that the inscription now marked as No. 53.4 in Lucknow museum is not Führer's Treta Ka Thakur inscription. According to Habib (2007), Führer's inscription was stolen from Lucknow Museum, and planted as the Vishnu-Hari inscription in the Babri mosque debris. Fuhrer's inscription was dated 1184 CE, which means that it would have been issued during the reign of Govindachandra's grandson Jayachandra. Habib alleged that the Hindu activists deliberately damaged the date portion of the inscription to hide this fact. He points out that the inscriptions of Govindachandra mention grandiloquent royal titles such as Ashva-pati Nara-pati Gaja-pati. But this particular inscription does not mention any such title for Govindachandra. Therefore, he concludes that the "Govindachandra" mentioned in this inscription was not the Gahadavala monarch, but a "weak Gahadavala princeling" of the same name, who was a contemporary of Jayachandra. Habib theorizes that Ayodhya came under the control of the imperial Gahadavalas, sometime after 1184 CE, during Jayachandra's reign.

Kishore Kunal (2016) criticizes Habib's theory, and concludes that the Vishnu-Hari inscription is different from Führer's Treta Ka Thakur inscription. According to him, the Lucknow Museum Inscription No. 53.4 is indeed Führer's inscription.

Kishore criticizes Pushpa Prasad's conclusions about Inscription No. 53.4. He disagrees with her contention that the handwritings on the two fragments look different. According to him, the topmost letters in the upper fragment are the smallest, and their size gradually increases towards the bottom of the upper fragment. The size increases further in the lower fragment. Kishore concludes that the engraver probably started with small letters, but then realized that the remaining space was more than sufficient, and therefore, gradually enlarged the letters. He further points out that several other historical inscriptions also feature variations in letter size, presenting the Prayaga prashasti of Samudragupta as an example. Kishore further notes that four letters broken in the upper fragment continue in the lower fragment, which clearly indicates that the two fragments belong to the same inscription. The surviving text appears to be Sanskrit verse written in the shardulavikridita metre. The surviving text, as deciphered by Bhavanath Jha, is unintelligible because the sentences are not complete. The extant words in each verse form only one-fourth of a typical shardulavikridita metre verse. Based on this, Kishore theorizes that the portion containing these two fragments formed the left part of a four-times larger inscription. The surviving text does not offer any evidence to show that the upper portion describes a land grant, or that the lower part describes invocation to a deity, thus invalidating Prasad's claim.

Kishore notes that the Lucknow Museum has no record of any other pre-1953 inscription transferred from the now-defunct Faizabad Museum. According to him, around 40% of the content from the first four lines of Inscription No. 53 appears to have been deliberately removed by a saw or a chisel. This part probably mentioned the date of the inscription (1241 VS), as mentioned in Führer's 1899 book. Since the surviving text does not mention Jayachandra or the construction of a temple, Kishore theorizes that Führer may have dated it to Jayachandra's reign on the basis of its date, and because it appears to praise a king. Similarly, Führer probably assumed that it records the construction of a temple, because it was found at the ruined Treta Ka Thakur mosque, which is said to have been constructed over the ruins of a temple.

According to Kishore, Irfan Habib misleadingly translates the line Govindachandra-kshitipāla-rājya-sthariryāya in Verse 22 as "for the stability of Govindachandra's kingdom". This translation omits the word kshitpala, which means "the protector (ruler) of the earth". In addition, the Verse 19 describes Govindachandra as dharaṇīndra ("the master of the world"). These royal epithets indicate Govindachandra could not have been a "weak Gahadavala princeling", as claimed by Habib. According to Kishore, this Govindachandra was indeed the Gahadavala monarch. Kishore also notes that Ayodhya has been mentioned in the inscriptions of the Gahadavala monarchs before Jayachandra, including the dynasty's founder Chandradeva as well as in the other inscriptions of Govindachandra. Thus, Habib's theory that Ayodhya came under Jayachandra's control after 1184 CE is inaccurate.

=== Other identifications ===
Archaeologist Sita Ram Roy (1996) dates the inscription to the 18th century, arguing that the Nagari characters of the inscription are far more developed than the characters that appear in a 1098 CE inscription of the Gahadavala dynasty's founder Chandradeva. K. M. Shrimali of Delhi University agreed with Roy's dating, although Roy subsequently told the Allahabad High Court that he had not seen the "full photograph, estampage of the inscription or its decipherment" at the time of making this assertion.

Historian Ram Sharan Sharma argues that the word the Sanskrit mandira, which occurs in this inscription, originally meant "dwelling" and was not used to describe a Hindu shrine in any Sanskrit text until the 18th century. Moreover, no earlier sources including the writings of the 17th century saint Tulsidas, refer to any temple at Rama's birthplace. Based on these arguments, Sharma concludes that the Vishnu-Hari inscription is a 17th-century inscription that was mysteriously "thrust and concealed in the brick-wall" of the 16th century Babri mosque.
