= K. V. Ramesh (archaeologist) =

Indian epigraphist (1935-2013)

Dr. Koluvail Vyasaraya Ramesh
- Born: June 8, 1935; Palakkad, Kerala
- Died: July 10, 2013 (aged 78); Mysore, India
- Occupations: Archaeologist; Epigraphist
- Spouse: Prema

Dr. Koluvail Vyasaraya Ramesh (8 June 1935 – 10 July 2013) was an Indian epigraphist and Sanskrit scholar who served as the Chief Epigraphist and Joint Director General of the Archaeological Survey of India (ASI).

== Early life and education ==
Born in Palakkad, Kerala on 8 June 1935 into a Tulu-speaking Mangalorean family, Ramesh obtained a master's degrees in Sanskrit and literature from the University of Madras and a doctorate from the Karnatak University, Dharwad.

== Career at the ASI ==
In 1956, Ramesh joined the Archaeological Survey of India as an epigraphical assistant and was posted to Ootacamund. He became the Deputy Superintending Epigraphist of the Chennai circle in 1966, Superintending Epigraphist in 1976 and Chief Epigraphist in 1984. As Superintending epigraphist, Ramesh succeeded G. S. Gai as the editor of ASI's bulletin Epigraphia Indica and edited the last two volumes in 1975-76 and 1977-78.

Ramesh became the Joint Director General of the ASI in May 1992 and served until his retirement in June 1993. Post-retirement, Ramesh served as the Honorary Director of the Oriental Research Institute, Mysore from 1998 to 2006.

He was the first one to have deciphered a 12th century Sanskrit inscription at the Ram Mandir site in Ayodhya, which proved the existence of a temple at the site before the Babri Masjid was built over it.

== Views on Tamil-Brahmi ==
Ramesh believed that the Tamil-Brahmi script was pre-Asokan and that it originated as a South Indian script which was later adapted to write an Indo-Iranian language. When pottery bearing Tamil-Brahmi script found at Porunthal was radiocarbon dated to 490 BC, Ramesh cited the discovery in support of his claim.

== Personal life ==
Dr. K.V. Ramesh was fluent in Kannada, Sanskrit, English, Hindi, Tulu, Malayalam, Telugu and Tamil. Dr. K.V. Ramesh married his wife Prema in 1963 and had three daughters. He retired as a Joint Director General of ASI in New Delhi. Throughout Dr. Ramesh's career, he traveled extensively throughout India and around the world to countries in Europe, Asia and the U.S., consulting as an expert epigraphist.

== Death ==
Dr. K.V. Ramesh died at his home in Mysore on 10 July 2013.

== Honours ==
He was awarded the "Karnataka Purathathva Ratna" award in 2010.

== Works ==
He published four books in Kannada and nine books in English.
