= Govindachandra (Gahadavala dynasty) =

King of Kannauj from 1114 to 1155

- Ashva-pati; Nara-pati; Gaja-pati; Rajatrayadhipati; Shrimad-Govindachandra
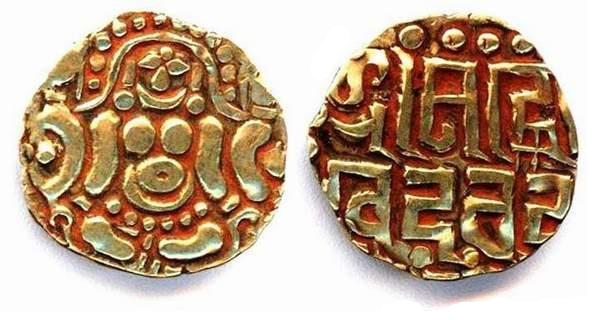
- A Kalachuri-style 'seated goddess' coin of Govindachandra (r. c. 1114–1155 CE). 4 1/2 masha, gold. Obv: Four-armed Tathagat Buddha seated cross-legged on lotus on obverse side holding a lotus in the upper two hands. Rev: Inscription in Nagari script :'Shrimad-Govindachandra'.

King of Kannauj
- Reign: c. 1114–1155 CE
- Predecessor: Madanapala
- Successor: Vijayachandra
- Spouse: Nayanakeli-devi, Gosalla-devi, Kumara-devi, and Vasanta-devi
- Issue: Asphotachandra, Rajyapala and Vijayachandra
- Dynasty: Gahadavala
- Father: Madanapala
- Mother: Ralhadevi

Govindachandra (IAST: Govindacandra, r. c. 1114–1155 CE) was the King of Kannauj from 1114 to 1155 and was a member of the Gahadavala dynasty.

Govindachandra was the most powerful ruler of his dynasty. As a prince, he achieved military successes against the Ghaznavids and the Palas. As a sovereign, he defeated the Kalachuris of Tripuri, and annexed some of their territories.

The "Vishnu-Hari inscription" recording the construction of a temple during Govindachandra's reign was found among the Babri mosque debris. The authenticity of this inscription is controversial. According to some historians, it proves that Govindachandra's subordinate Anayachandra constructed a temple at the site believed to be Rama's birthplace; this temple was later destroyed and replaced with the Babri mosque by Muslim conquerors. Other historians allege that the Hindu activists planted the so-called Vishnu-Hari inscription at the Babri mosque site, and that the Govindachandra mentioned in it is a different person.

== Early life ==
Govindachandra was born to the Gahadavala monarch Madanapala. The last extant inscription from Madanapala's reign is dated 1109 CE, and the first inscription from Govindachandra's reign is dated 1114 CE. Thus, Govindachandra must have ascended the throne sometime during 1109–1114 CE.

His mother was probably Ralhadevi, who seems to have died sometime before 1141 CE. An 1141 CE grant of Govindachandra mentions that it was made on the occasion of the "day of the great queen Ralhadevi".

== As a prince ==
=== Repulsion of Ghaznavid invasion ===
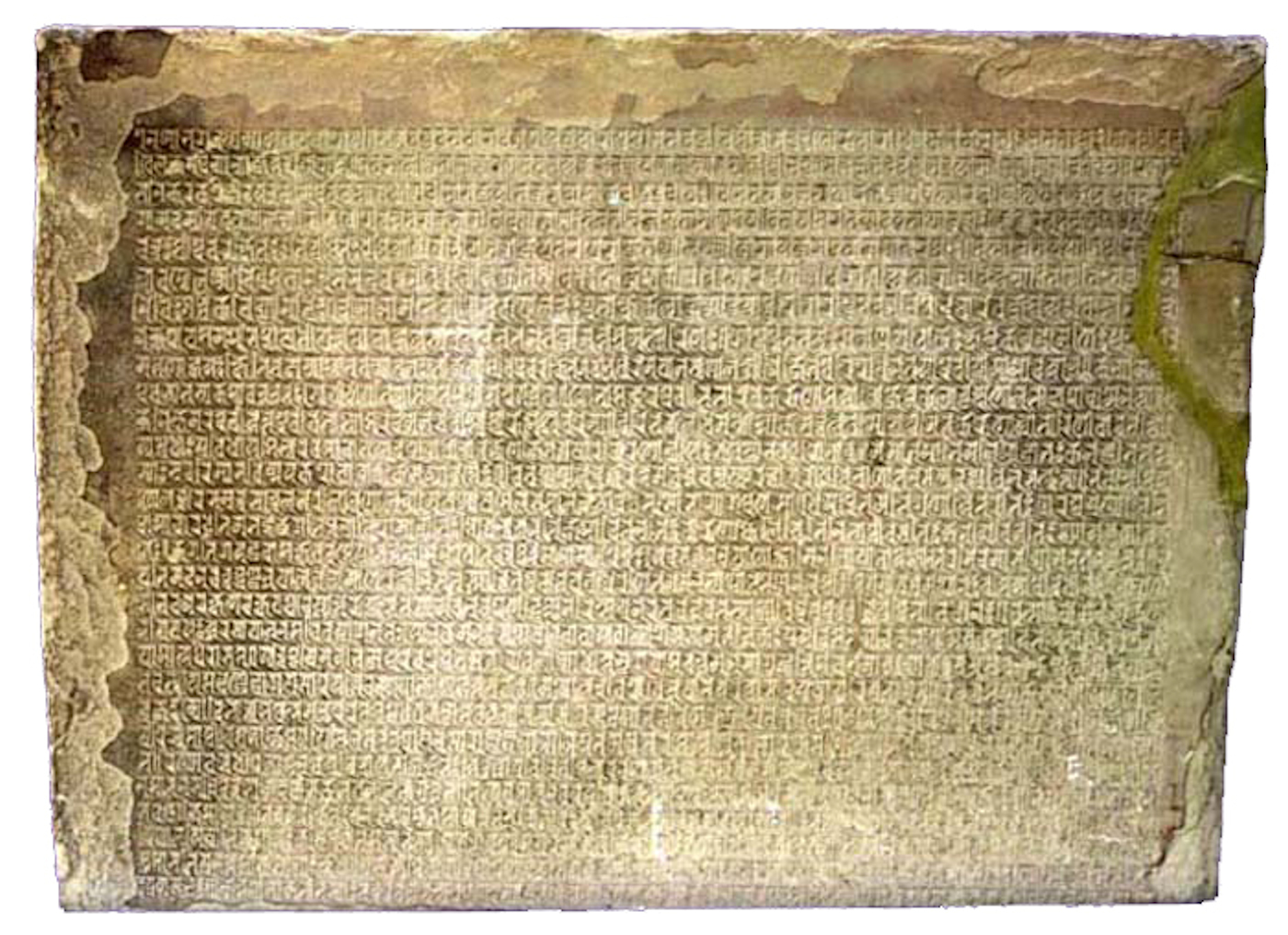
Inscription of Kumaradevi, the Queen of Gahadawala king Govindachandra who belonged to the Pithipatis of Bodh Gaya, which refers the construction of Dharmachakra-Jina-Vihara at Sarnath, and the invasions of the "wicked" Turushkas. 12th century CE.

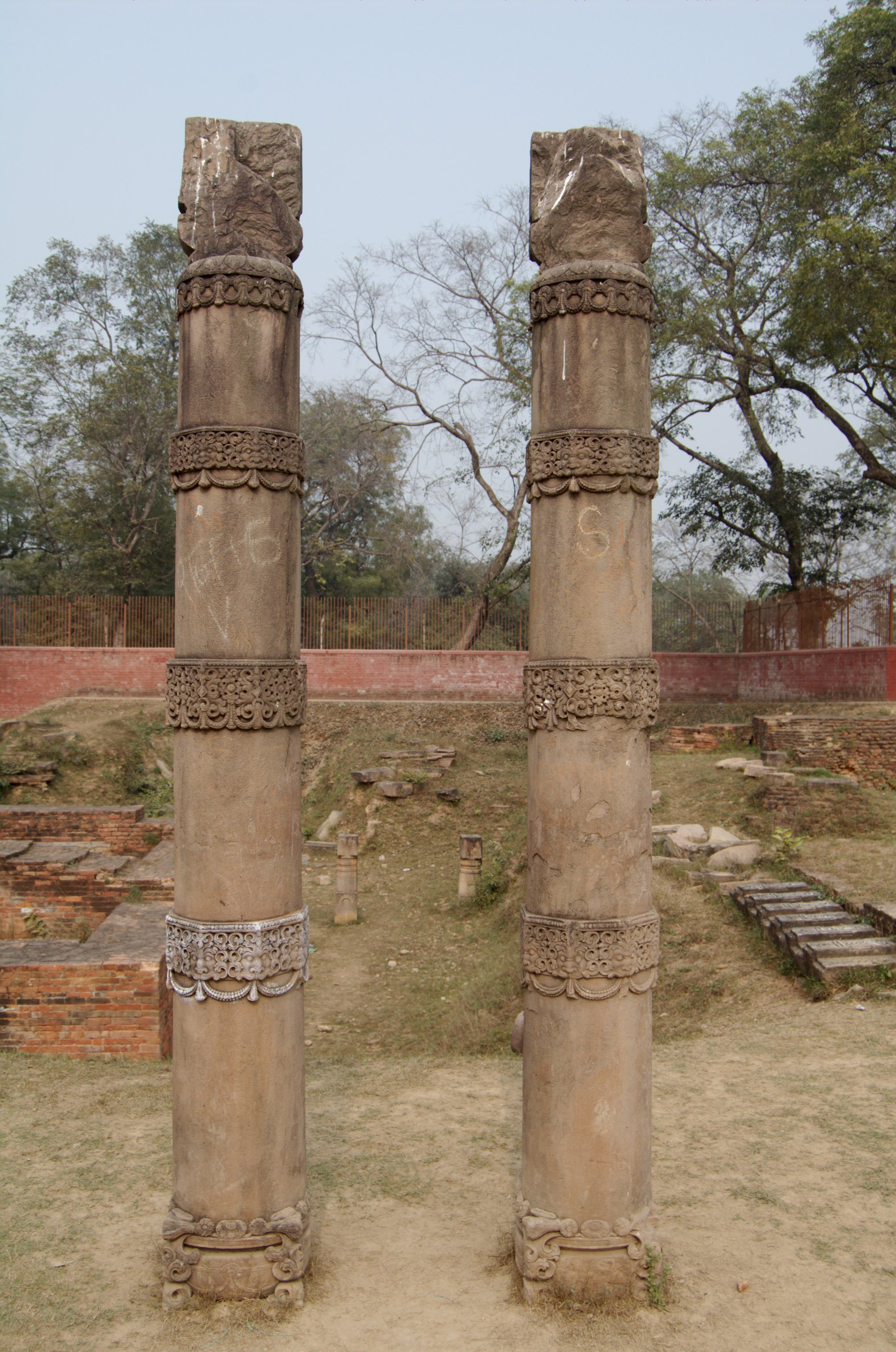
Remains of decorated pillars in the Dharmachakra-Jina-Vihara established by Queen Kumaradevi.

Diwan-i-Salman, a chronicle by the contemporary Muslim historian Salman, states that the Muslim Ghaznavid ruler Mas'ud III invaded India. According to Salman, the Ghaznavid forces captured Malhi, the ruler of Kanauj (Kanyakubja). "Malhi" is generally identified with Govindachandra's father Madanapala. It appears that the Gahadavalas lost Kanyakubja somewhere between 1104 CE and 1105 CE, and Govindachandra led a war to recover it.

The inscriptions issued by Govindachandra as a prince (Maharajaputra) indicate that he managed to restore the Gahadavala power in Kanyakubja and its surrounding area by 1109 CE. A peace treaty was probably concluded between the two parties, as indicated by the 1109 CE Rahin (or Rahan) inscription. According to this epigraph, prince Govindachandra fought repeatedly against "Hammira", and made him lay aside his enmity. Hammira is the Sanskrit form of the Arabic title "Amir", which was used by the Ghaznavids. According to Salman, the Ghaznavids released Malhi only after the payment of a ransom.

Subsequently, a Ghaznavid general appears to have launched an unsuccessful attack on the Gahadavala kingdom. Kṛtya-Kalpataru, written by Govindachandra's courtier Lakshmidhara, states that Govindachandra killed the Hammira. This incident may have happened during the reign of Madanapala, or early during the reign of Govindachandra. The undated Sarnath inscription of Govindachandra's queen Kumaradevi praises him for protecting Varanasi from the "wicked" Turushkas (Turkic people, that is, the Ghaznavids).

=== Conflict with Ramapala ===
Sometime before 1109 CE, the Palas of eastern India invaded the Gahadavala kingdom, probably as a retaliation for Chandradeva's earlier invasion of their kingdom. The 1109 CE Rahin inscription boasts that even as a prince, Govindachandra subdued the elephants of Gauda (the Pala kingdom). The Kṛtya-Kalpataru declares that the mere sport of Govindachandra threatened the elephants of Gauda.

This war appears to have ended with a peace treaty concluded through a matrimonial alliance. Govindachandra married Kumaradevi, the daughter of a Devaraksita of the Pithipatis of Bodh Gaya.

== As a sovereign ==
Govindachandra was the most powerful king of his family. The Gahadavalas became the most prominent power of northern India as a result of his military conquests and diplomatic relations.

The 1114 CE Pali inscription, which is the earliest extant inscription from Govindachandra's reign, states that he captured the "elephants of nine kingdoms" (nava-rajya-gaja). According to one theory, this term is a conventional literary device to announce the king's claim of being a leading monarch. Another interpretation is that it refers to Govindachandra's conquest of Kanyakubja from another ruler called Gadhipuradhipati Gopala.

=== Successes against the Kalachuris ===
Govindachandra seems to have captured some territories from the Kalachuris, who were his southern neighbours. The Kalachuri king defeated by Govindachandra was probably Yashahkarna or his successor Gayakarna.

The Kalachuri king Yashahkarna had granted the Karanda and Karandatalla villages to his royal perceptor (rajguru) Rudra-Shiva. An 1120 CE inscription of Govindachandra records the grant of these villages to Thakkura Vashishtha. In this inscription, Govindachandra assumed the traditional Kalachuri titles Ashva-pati Nara-pati Gaja-pati Rajatrayadhipati (literally, "leader of three forces: the cavalry, the infantry and the elephant corps"). This imitation was presumably a way of celebrating his victory over the Kalachuris. His descendants inherited these titles.

Govindachandra's coins also corroborate the theory that he defeated the Kalachuris. These coins featured a seated goddess: this design had originally been introduced by the Kalachuri king Gangeya-deva. Govindachandra must have adapted this style after his victory over the Kalachuris.

The identity of the Karanda and Karandatalla villages is not certain, so it is difficult to determine which part of the Kalachuri kingdom was annexed by Govindachandra. A 1237 CE inscription from the reign of a Gahadavala prince named Adakkamalla was found in the Nagod State (present-day Satna district, Madhya Pradesh). Adakkamalla ruled the area even after the end of the imperial Gahadavala branch; Govindachandra might have appointed his ancestor as a governor of the newly conquered Kalachuri territory. If this assumption is true, the territory annexed by Govindachandra must have been located in the region between the Yamuna and the Sone rivers.

=== Conflict with Madanapala ===
Gorakhpur, Patna and Munger

Govindachandra's marriage to the Pithipati princess Kumaradevi had secured the eastern frontier of the Gahadavala kingdom. However, there seems to have been some kind of conflict between the two kingdoms during the 1140s. The 1124 CE Maner inscription of Govindachandra was found in the present-day Patna district. However, the Pala king Madanapala (not to be confused with Govindachandra's father) is known to have gained control of this area sometime during 1145–1147 CE. The 1146 Lar inscription of Govindachandra records the grants of villages located in present-day Gorakhpur district. However, it was issued at Mudgagiri (modern Munger), which is located to the east of Patna and Gorakhpur. Inscriptional evidence proves that Munger later came under the control of Madanapala.

This evidence cannot be interpreted with certainty, but it is possible that Govindachandra invaded the Pala kingdom sometime around 1146 CE, and advanced up to Munger, where he issued the 1146 CE inscription. Madanapala repulsed this invasion and chased the Gahadavala army up to Patna before returning to his own kingdom. Another possibility is that Madanapala invaded the Gahadavala kingdom and advanced up to Patna. Govindachandra repulsed this invasion, and advanced up to Munger in the enemy's pursuit, before turning back.

An inscription of Madanapala's war-and-peace minister Bhimadeva was discovered at Rajghat in Varanasi. Based on this, D. C. Sircar theorized that the Palas may have occupied Varanasi (which was the seat of the Gahadavala power) at one time.

=== Other possible conflicts ===
==== Claim of Dasharna conquest ====
Rambha-Manjari-Nataka, a play by the 15th century writer Nayachandra, states that Jayachandra was born on the day his father Govindachandra conquered Dasharna. This territory was a part of the Paramara kingdom of Malwa. The contemporary Paramara kings Naravarman and Yashovarman were weak rulers, and the Gahadavalas may have taken advantage of this opportunity. The Chandelas, whose territory was located between the Gahadavala and Paramara kingdoms, were friendly with Govindachandra, and may have allowed him to pass through their kingdom.

However, Nayachandra's claim is not supported by any other literary or epigraphic evidence. Therefore, the historical accuracy of this claim is doubtful.

==== Second battle against the Ghaznavids ====
An inscription of Govindachandra's queen Kumaradevi states that he had been sent by Hara (Shiva) to protect the holy city of Varanasi from the Turushka (Turkic people, that is, the Ghaznavids). This has led to speculation that Govindachandra fought against the Ghaznavids as a sovereign as well. However, there is no record of any Ghaznavid army advancing up to Varanasi. It is possible that Bahram Shah or his son Khusrau Shah may have fought with a feudatory of Govindachandra at the kingdom's north-western border. The praise bestowed upon Govindachandra for protecting Varanasi may be a reference to his general vigilance against the potential Ghaznavid attacks.

== Diplomatic relations ==
Govindachandra's marriage to the Pithipati princess Kumaradevi had led to peaceful relations between the two kingdoms for several years.

Govindachandra's relations with the Chandela king Madanavarman also appear to have been friendly. The Mau inscription from Madanavarman's reign states that the king of Kashi (Varanasi) remained friendly to him. This king of Kashi can be identified with Govindachandra. Although the Gahadavala records do not mention any friendship between the two kings, it is quite plausible, given that the Kalachuris of Tripuri were their common enemies.

Jajjaladeva, a ruler of the Tummana Kalachuri branch, also maintained friendly relations with Govindachandra. His 1114 CE Ratanpur inscription states that he had been honoured by the king of Kanyakubja.

An inscription detailing the Gahadavala genealogy from Yashovigraha to Chandradeva has been found at Gangaikonda Cholapuram in the Chola territory. It ends abruptly, so the name of its issuer is not certain, but it appears to have been issued during the reign of either Madanavarman or Govindachandra. Historian H. C. Ray speculated that the Gahadavalas and the Cholas may have developed friendly relations, because they both shared the Kalachuris as a common enemy. As a result, a Gahadavala prince may have visited Gangaikonda Cholapuram and issued the inscription. The 1119 CE Set-Mahet inscription states that Govindachandra made some grants at the request of a monk from the Chola kingdom. This further corroborates the theory of friendly relations between the two kingdoms.

According to Rajatarangini, the contemporary Kashmiri king Jayasimha made the rulers of Kanyakubja and other kingdoms "proud of his friendship". Shrikantha-Charita by Jayasimha's courtier Mankha states that Govindachandra sent one Suhala to attend an assembly of scholars held by the Kashmiri minister Alamkara. These evidences point to friendly diplomatic relations between the Gahadavalas and the rulers of Kashmir.

== Extent of the kingdom ==
Find spots of inscriptions from Govindachandra's reign

A number of inscriptions from Govindachandra's reign are available. The find spots of these inscriptions and the locations mentioned in them provide an idea of the territorial extent of his kingdom.

In the north-east, his kingdom was probably bounded by the Burhi Gandak River. The northern boundary of his kingdom is debatable. His grandfather Chandradeva ruled a place called Indrasthaniyaka; some scholars identify it as the modern Delhi. Based on this identification, historian Roma Niyogi theorizes that Tomaras of Delhi may have served as Govindachandra's feudatories in the north-west. However, P. C. Roy is critical of this theory, as no historical records establish the Gahadavala presence in Delhi. He points out that Rahin (or Rahan) village in Etawah district is the furthest point in the north-west where a Gahadavala inscription has been discovered. Therefore, he believes that Indrasthaniyaka is not same as Delhi.

The Rashtrakutas of Kannauj were Govindachandra's feudatories. The Yamuna River probably formed the southern boundary of his father's kingdom, and Govindachandra appears to have annexed some Kalachuri territories to the south of Yamuna.

In the east, Govindachandra controlled a part of the present-day Bihar. His easternmost inscription has been found at Maner in Patna district. His 1146 CE Lar inscription mentions that it was issued from Mudgagiri (modern Munger), which is located further east. However, the Pala inscriptions in this area indicate that he lost this territory by the end of his reign. Nayachandra's play Rambha-Manjari-Nataka claims that he conquered Dasharna (Malwa) in the west, but this claim is not supported by any other evidence.

== Family ==
Four queens of Govindachandra are known: Nayanakeli-devi, Gosalla-devi, Kumara-devi, and Vasanta-devi. The first two bore the title of the chief queen (patta-mahadevi), probably one after another. The 1119 Kamauli grant of Govindachandra records a gift by the chief queen Nayanakeli. The later 1151 CE Bangarmau grant records a gift by the chief queen Gosalla-devi.

An undated Sarnath inscription of Kumaradevi indicates that she was a Buddhist. Her father Devarakshita, a member of the Chikkora dynasty of Pithi, was a Pala vassal. Her mother Shankaradevi was a daughter of the Rashtrakuta Mathana-deva of Anga, who was also a Pala feudatory & the maternal uncle of the Pala ruler Ramapala, according to the Ramacharitam. Vasantadevi was also a Mahayana Buddhist, as attested by a text called Ashta-Sahasrika-Prajna-Paramita.

Three sons of Govindachandra are known: Asphota-chandra, Rajya-pala and Vijaya-chandra. Asphotachandra bore the title Yuvaraja (heir apparent), as attested by 1134 CE inscription. Rajyapala bore the title Maharajaputra (prince), as attested by the 1143 CE Gagaha inscription and the 1146 CE Varanasi inscription. But the actual successor of Govindachandra was Vijayachandra, whose first inscription is dated 1168 CE. It is not known why Vijayachandra ascended the throne when Asphotachandra was the yuvaraja. It is possible that the other two princes died during Govindachandra's lifetime, or that Vijayachandra defeated them in a war of succession, but there is no concrete evidence for either of these hypotheses.

The last extant inscription of Govindachandra is dated 1154 CE, and the earliest available inscription of his successor Vijayachandra is dated 1168 CE. Such a long gap is unusual for the dynasty, and may indicate troubled times arising out of an external invasion or a war of succession after Govindachandra's death.

== Cultural activities ==
According to the Gahadavala inscriptions, Govindachandra appreciated and patronized different branches of learning (as indicated by his title Vividha-vidya-vichara-vachaspati). Govindachandra's courtier Lakshmidhara composed Kṛtya-Kalpataru at the king's request. Lakshmidhara was a scholar, a warrior and a diplomat.

== Coinage ==
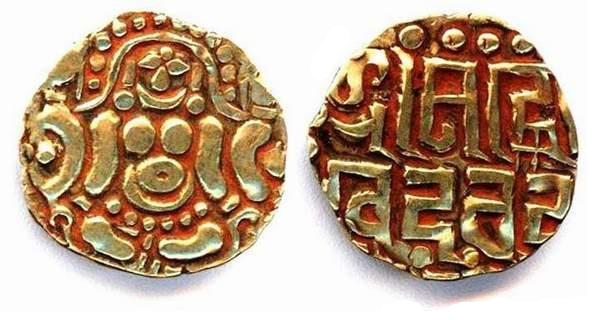
A coin of Govindachandra

Nearly 1,000 gold coins of Govindachandra have been discovered, besides some silver and copper coins. A hoard of 800 of his gold coins was discovered near Nanpara in 1887, during railway construction work. The coins are made of impure gold, and contain a large mixture of silver. Most of the other coins have been discovered at various parts of present-day Uttar Pradesh and Bihar.

Govindachandra's coins feature a seated goddess. Originally used by the Kalachuris of Tripuri, this style was probably adapted by Govindachandra to celebrate his victory over the Kalachuris. One side of the coins features the king's name ("Shrimad-Govindachandra-deva") in three lines, usually followed by a trishula. The other side features a four-armed seated goddess, identified with Lakshmi.

After defeating Govindachandra's grandson Jayachandra, Muhammad of Ghor also adapted this style, and issued coins featuring the seated goddess.

== Inscriptions ==
The following inscriptions issued by Govindachandra, or issued by others during his reign, have been discovered:

Date of issue (CE)	Find spot	Issued at	Issued by	Purpose
25 December 1104	Etawah district: Bashai (Basahi)	Asatika on Yamuna	Govindachandra (as a prince)	Village grant
24 October 1105	Varanasi district: Kamauli	Vishnupura on Ganga	Govindachandra (as a prince)	Village grant
1114	Gorakhpur district: Pali	Varanasi	Govindachandra	Land grant
15 October 1114	Varanasi district: Kamauli	Varanasi	Govindachandra	Village grant
11 January 1115	Varanasi district: Varanasi (Near Bhadaini temple)	Varanasi	Govindachandra	House grant
3 March 1116	Etawah district: Bashai (or Basahi)	Unknown	Govindachandra	Village grant
7 April 1116	Varanasi district: Kamauli	Varanasi	Govindachandra	Village grant
29 August 1117	Varanasi district: Kamauli	Varanasi	Govindachandra	Village grant
28 January 1119	Varanasi district: Kamauli	Varanasi	Govindachandra	Village grant
11 May 1119	Varanasi district: Kamauli	Varanasi	Queen Nayanakelidevi	Village grant
October 1118 – 1119	Varanasi district: Kamauli	Varanasi	Govindachandra	Village grant
1119–1120	Shravasti district: Set-Mahet	Unknown	Vidyadhara, a subject of Govindachandra's feudatory Madana	Establishment of a Buddhist sangha
1119–1120	Siwan district: Don Buzurg	Mamdalia on Ganga	Govindachandra	Village grant
1120	Unknown	Unknown	Govindachandra	Village grant
1120	Kanpur Nagar district: Chhatarpur	Varanasi	Govindachandra	Village grant
21 July 1122	Varanasi district: Kamauli	Varanasi: Kapala-Mochana Ghatta	Govindachandra	Village grant
9 September 1124	Unknown	Unknown	Ralhana-Devi	Village grant
1124	Patna district: Maner	Kanyakubja	Govindachandra	Village grant
1126	Varanasi district: Kamauli	Unknown place on Ganga	Govindachandra	Village grant
1127	Unknown	Ishapratishthana on Ganga	Govindachandra	Village grant
1127	Varanasi district: Kamauli	Varanasi	Govindachandra	Village grant
1127	Pratapgarh district: Tala	Prayaga	Govindachandra	Village grant
1128	Varanasi district: Varanasi	Varanasi	Govindachandra	Village grant
1128–29	Shravasti district: Set-Mahet	Varanasi	Govindachandra	Village grants to Buddhist monks
1129	Unknown (from Raja of Itaunja)	Varanasi	Govindachandra	Village grant
16 November 1130	Varanasi district: Varanasi (Near Bhadaini temple)	Varanasi	Govindachandra	Village grant
21 November 1130	Sitapur district: Raiwan	Varanasi (Adikeshava Ghatta)	Govindachandra	Village grant
6 November 1131	Fatehpur district: Ren	Varanasi (Adikeshava Ghatta)	Govindachandra	Village grant
29 April 1132	Gorakhpur district: Pali	Varanasi (Svapnashvara Ghatta)	Ralhana-Devi	Land grant
5 August 1133	Varanasi district: Kamauli	Govindavatika	Govindachandra	Village grant
30 March 1134	Varanasi district: Varanasi	Varanasi	Asphotachandra (prince)	Village grant
28 August 1134	Varanasi district: Kamauli	Varanasi (Avimukta-Kshetra Ghatta)	Vatsaraja of Shingara family (feudatory)	Village grant
1139	Varanasi district: Kamauli	Varanasi	Govindachandra	Village grant during lunar eclipse
1140	Varanasi district: Varanasi (Rajghat)	Varanasi (Adikeshava Ghatta)	Govindachandra	Village grant
23 February 1141	Varanasi district: Kamauli	Varanasi (Vedeshvara Ghatta)	Govindachandra	Village grant
23 February 1141	Varanasi district: Kamauli	Varanasi (Avimukta-Kshetra Ghatta)	Govindachandra	Village grant
27 February 1141	Gorakhpur district: Gagaha	Gumjhada-grama on Triveni river	Rajyapala-deva (prince)	Estate grant
16 July 1144	Varanasi district: Kamauli	Varanasi	Govindachandra	Village grant
19 April 1143	Jaunpur district: Machhali Shahar	Varanasi	Govindachandra	Village grant
14 April 1146	Deoria district: Lar	Mudgagiri	Govindachandra	Village grant
25 December 1146	Varanasi district: Varanasi (Near Bhadaini temple)	Rajyapalapura on Ganga	Rajyapala-deva (prince)	Village grant
25 December 1150	Varanasi district: Varanasi (Near Bhadaini temple)	Varanasi: Koti-tirtha	Govindachandra	Village grant
6 November 1150	Unnao district: Bangarmau	Varanasi: Lolarka temple	Gosaladevi (queen)	Village grant
1151	Azamgarh district: Hathia-Dah (near Deogaon)	Unknown	Bellana Thakura (officer of Queen Gosaladevi)	Excavation of a tank
10 August 1154	Varanasi district: Kamauli	Varanasi	Govindachandra	Village grant
Undated	Varanasi district: Sarnath	Unknown	Kumaradevi (queen)	Restoration of a Buddhist shrine

The Hari-Vishnu inscription, said to have been found at the Babri mosque during its demolition in 1992, also mentions one Govindachandra. It records the construction of a temple by Govindachandra's subordinate Anayachandra. Its date portion is missing, and its authenticity has been a matter of controversy. Those who believe that a temple existed at Babri mosque site consider the inscription as an evidence of their claim. Others have claimed that the inscription was brought to Ayodhya from the Lucknown State Museum, and planted at Ayodhya by Hindu activists. According to this theory, the "Govindachandra" mentioned in the inscription was not the Gahadavala monarch, but a subordinate noble.
