= Tarikh Yamini =

History book by Muhammad ibn Abd al-Jabbar al-Utbi

- Author: Muhammad ibn Abd al-Jabbar al-Utbi
- Language: Arabic
- Subject: History of the reigns of Sebuktigin and Mahmud

The Tarikh i Yamini, or Kitab i Yamini is an Arabic-language chronicle of the reigns of Sebuktigin and Mahmud of Ghazni, written by Muhammad ibn Abd al-Jabbar al-Utbi.

Written as a panegyric in rhymed prose, it narrates the whole of the reign of Sebuktigin, and part of that of Mahmud, up to year 410 Hijra (1020 AD). The Tarikh Yamini also contains information chronicling Sultan Mahmud's expeditions as well as the end of the Samanid Empire. Al-Utbi, being Mahmud's secretary, did not accompany the sultan, therefore his topography is deficient and his writing style consists of an explicit orthodox nature. He also states that he intentionally suppressed many events, unnatural or strange that he found skeptical that did not fit the objectives he had set down in the preface.

== Content ==
The Tarikh Yamini starts in 965 CE, but the Samanids are not mentioned until the reign of Nuh II in 976, while it goes into detail about the Buyids prior to 983. During the Qarakhanid invasion of the Samanid kingdom in 991, the Tarikh Yamini states that the Samanid governor Fa'iq, son of Simjurid ruler Abu'l-Hasan Simjuri, invited Hasan bin Sulayman{Bughra Khan} to invade Bukhara.

Al-Utbi gives contradictory information owing to the names and number of Farighunid rulers. Specifically never naming Abu'l Haret Muhammad, the second Farighunid ruler.

Al-Utbi states when Sebuktigin defeated Jayapala in 988, the Afghans and Khaljis of the territory he conquered between Lamghan and Peshawar surrendered and agreed to serve him. Iqtidar Husain Siddiqui, citing the 13th century Persian translation, claims that Al-Utbi mentions the "Afghans" were pagans given to rapine and rapacity, they were defeated and converted to Islam.

Despite errors in dates and topography, the Tarikh Yamini nonetheless contains valuable information concerning Sultan Mahmud's invasions of India.

Marcel Courthiade theorises that the Romani people fled India because of the Ghaznavid invasions, arguing that the Romani are mentioned in the Tarikh Yamini's discussion of the 1018 capture of Kannauj. However, this is a controversial theory among academics. Linguistic evidence shows that Romani speakers were in contact with Armenian by the 9th century and Byzantine Greek by the 10th, which suggests their migration from India must have occurred during the second half of the first millennium, prior to the Ghaznavid invasions.

== Early translations ==
The 13th century Persian translation of the Tarikh i Yamini, by Jurbadqani, takes many liberties and introduces images not found in the original and can be considered an independent work of art; however, it is a fairly reliable copy of the narrative.

== Modern era ==
The Tarikh i Yamini was translated from Persian into English in 1858 by James Reynolds under the title, Kitab-i-Yamini.

== Sources ==
- Bosworth, C. Edmund (2000). "Sistan and Its Local Histories". Iranian Studies. 33 (1/2 (Winter – Spring)).
- Dunlop, D.M. (1991). "Farighunids". In Lewis, B.; Pellat, CH.; Schacht, J. (eds.). The Encyclopaedia of Islam. Vol. II: C-G. Brill. pp. 798–800.
- Farooqui, Salma Ahmed (2011). A Comprehensive History of Medieval India: From Twelfth to the Mid-Eighteenth Century. Dorling Kindersley.
- Frye, Richard Nelson (1999). "The Samanids". In Frye, R. N. (ed.). The Cambridge History of Iran. Vol. 4. Cambridge University Press.
- Khan, M. S. (1969). "Miskawaih and Arabic Historiography". Journal of the American Oriental Society. 89 (4 (Oct. – Dec.)). American Oriental Society.
- Khan, M.S. (1976). "al-Bīrūnī and the Political History of India". Oriens. 25/26. Brill.
- Levi, Scott C. (2002). "Hindus beyond the Hindu Kush: Indians in the Central Asian Slave Trade". Journal of the Royal Asiatic Society. Third Series, Vol. 12, No. 3 (Nov.).
- Mitra, Devirupa (2016). "Romas Left India When Ghazni Invaded Kannauj, Claims Professor". The Indian Express.
- Raza, Jabir (1994). "The Afghans and their relations with the Ghaznavids and the Ghurids". Proceedings of the Indian History Congress. 55. Indian History Congress: 786–791.
- Sharma, Tej Ram (2005). Historiography: A History of Historical Writing. Concept Publishing Company.
- Siddiqui, Iqtidar Husain (1996). "The Process of Acculturation in Regional Historiography:The Case of the Delhi Sultanate". In Qaisar, Ahsan Jan; Verma, Som Prakash; Habib, Mohammad (eds.). Art and Culture: Endeavours in Interpretation. Vol. 1. Abhinav Publications.
- Wink, André (1997). Al-Hind, the Slave Kings and the Islamic Conquest, 11th–13th Centuries. Brill.
