= Madanapala (Gahadavala dynasty) =

- Parama-bhattaraka Maharajadhiraja Parameshvara Parama-Maheshvara

Gahadavala king
- Reign: c. 1104–1113 CE
- Predecessor: Chandradeva
- Successor: Govindachandra
- Spouse: Ralhadevi, Prithvishrika
- Issue: Govindachandra
- Dynasty: Gahadavala
- Father: Chandradeva

Madana-pala (IAST: Madanapāla, r. c. 1104–1113 CE), also known as Madana-chandra, was an Indian king from the Gahadavala dynasty. He ruled the Antarvedi country in present-day Uttar Pradesh, including Kanyakubja and Varanasi.

Madanapala's son Govindachandra played an active role in his administration, and repulsed the Ghaznavid and Pala invasions.

== Early life ==
Madanapala was a son of the Gahadavala king Chandradeva. An 1107 CE inscription gives his titles and name as Parama-bhattaraka Maharajadhiraja Parameshvara Parama-Maheshvara Shriman Madanapala-deva.

Inscriptional evidence suggests that Madanapala married at least two women: Ralhadevi (IAST: Rālhadevi) and Prithvishrika (IAST: Pṛthvīśrīkā). Ralhadevi was the mother of his successor Govindachandra.

== Military career ==
Find-spots of inscriptions from Madanapala's reign

The Gahadavala inscriptions attribute grand military victories to Madanapala using conventional praises, but do not provide any specific details. His son Govindachandra appears to have led the major wars that happened during his reign. These wars were of defensive nature, and did not lead to annexation of any enemy territory.

=== Conflict with the Ghaznavids ===
Madanapala's 1104 CE Bashai inscription states that his father Chandradeva had made Kanyakubja his capital, which suggests that he continued to rule from the same city. However, his 1105 CE Kamauli inscription omits the verse about Kanyakubja, although it contains the other introductory verses from the Bashai inscription. It appears that the Gahadavalas lost Kanyakubja somewhere between 1104 CE and 1105 CE.

The enemy to whom they temporarily lost Kanyakubja was most probably a general of the Ghaznavid ruler Mas'ud III. Diwan-i-Salman by the contemporary Muslim historian Salman states that Mas'ud III launched a holy war against Hindustan (or Hind). According to Salman, the Hind was ruled by the "god-forsaken" chief Malhi, and its capital was Kanauj (Kanyakubja). Salman further states that Kannauj (Kanyakubja) was like the Qibla for the infidels (non-Muslims), and all the treasures of Hindustan were concentrated there. The 13th-century text Tabaqat-i Nasiri also states that a general named Hajib Tughatigin invaded India during the reign of Mas'ud III. This general crossed the Ganga river, and reached places so far that no previous invader other than Mahmud of Ghazni had reached.

The "Malhi" mentioned by Salman appears to be Madanapala, as he was the ruler of Kanyakubja during 1104-1105 CE. According to Salman, the Ghaznavids captured Malhi, and released him only after the payment of a ransom. The inscriptions issued by prince Govindachandra indicate that he managed to restore the Gahadavala power in Kanyakubja and its surrounding area by 1109 CE. A peace treaty was probably concluded between the two parties, as indicated by the 1109 CE Rahin inscription. According to this epigraph, Maharajaputra (prince) Govindachandra fought repeatedly against "Hammira", and made him lay aside his enmity. Hammira is the Sanskrit form of the Arabic title "Amir", which was used by the Ghaznavids.

Subsequently, the Ghaznavids appear to have launched another attack on the Gahadavala kingdom, which was not successful. Kṛtya-Kalpataru, written by the Gahadavala courtier Lakshmidhara, states that Govindachandra killed the Hammira. This incident may have happened during the reign of Madanapala, or early in the reign of Govindachandra.

=== Conflict with the Palas ===
Sometime before 1109 CE, the Palas of eastern India invaded the Gahadavala kingdom, probably as a retaliation of Chandradeva's earlier invasion of their kingdom. The 1109 CE Rahin inscription boasts that prince Govindachandra subdued the elephants of Gauda (the Pala kingdom). The Kṛtya-Kalpataru declares that the mere sport of Govindachandra threatened the elephants of Gauda. This war appears to have ended with a peace treaty concluded through a matrimonial alliance: Govindachandra married a relative of the Pala king Ramapala.

== Successor ==
Madanapala was succeeded by his son Govindachandra, who had played an important part in administration and military campaigns during his father's reign. Even as a prince, Govindachandra issued multiple inscriptions, which record grants approved by what appears to be a regency council. Based on these inscriptions, the historians earlier speculated that Madanapala was only a nominal ruler, possibly because of an illness. However, in 1929, an inscription issued by Madanapala himself was discovered, which invalidated this theory.

== Coins ==
Some silver and copper coins featuring "bull-and-horseman" design have been attributed to Madanapala. Such coins were prevalent in the contemporary northern India. One side of the coins features the horseman, encircled by the king's short name (Madana, Mada or Shri-Ma). The other side features a humped bull with the legend Madha[va]-Shri-Sama[nta].

However, numismatist P. C. Roy believes that these coins have been wrongly attributed to the Gahadavala king. According to him, these coins were issued by a Tomara king of same name. He points out that there is no epigraphic or literary evidence about the issue of coins by the Gahadavala ruler Madanapala.

== Inscriptions ==
The following inscriptions from Madanapala's reign have been discovered:

Date of issue (CE)	Place of discovery	Issued at	Issued by	Purpose
25 December 1104	Etawah district: Bashai (Basahi)	Asatika on Yamuna	Govindachandra (prince)	Village grant issued with the consent of Purohita Jaguka, Mahattaka Balhana, and Pratihara Gautama
24 October 1105	Varanasi district: Kamauli	Vishnupura on Ganga	Govindachandra (prince)	Village grant issued with the consent of Queen Ralhadevi, Purohita Jaguka, Mahattaka Balhana, and Pratihara Gautama
1107	Pratapgarh district: Barera (or Badera)	Varanasi	Madanapala	Village grant
16 December 1109	Unknown	Varanasi (Adikeshava Ghatta)	Prithvishrika (Maharajni or queen)	Village grant
3 January 1109	Etawah district: Rahin (or Rahan)	Asatika on Yamuna	Lavanapravaha (ranaka or feudatory), approved by Govindachandra (prince)	Village grant issued with the consent of Mahattaka Gangeya.
