= Barera =

Village in Uttar Pradesh, India

Coordinates: 24°34′N 79°04′E

Barera (also Bharera) is a village in Prayagraj, Uttar Pradesh, India. It is located on the outskirts of Bijnor near New Delhi.
