= Muhammad ibn Abd al-Jabbar al-Utbi =

Medieval Arab historian

Al-Utbi
- Born: Muhammad ibn Abd al-Jabbar al-Utbi c. 961; Rayy, Buyid Empire
- Died: 1036/1040
- Occupations: Historian, Poet

Academic work
- Era: Samanid era, Ghaznavid era
- Notable works: Kitab al-Yamini

Muhammad ibn Abd al-Jabbar al-Utbi, called al-Utbi (c. 961 – 1036/1040), was an Arab historian, poet, and courtier. Born in Rayy, al-Utbi traveled to Nishapur with his uncle, Abu Nasr al-Utbi, who was a courtier for the Samanids. Al-Utbi became sahib al-barid, working as a secretary for the Turkic general Abū ʿAlī Simjūr and for the Ziyarid ruler Qabus ibn Wushmagir. He later worked for the Ghaznavid Sabuktigin, alongside the poet Abu 'l-Fath al-Busti. He was neither an official court historian nor a trained scholar, so his writing lacks precise dates and a consistent chronological order.

In 999, al-Utbi, as an envoy for Sultan Mahmud of Ghazni, was sent to Gharchistan to convince that ruler to recognize Mahmud as his overlord. He was patronized by the vizier Ahmad b. Hasan al-Maymandi. Later al-Utbi was removed from his position as sahib al-barid, due to plots by the governor. He spent the rest of his life in retirement, dying in the later period of Sultan Masʽud I's reign (1036/1040).

The history of his family goes back to Utba ibn Ghazwan, the founder of the city of Basra.

== Legacy ==
Around 1021, al-Utbi finished his work, Kitab al-Yamini. The al-Yamini, an embellished flowery rhetorical rhymed prose, is a history of the reigns of Sabuktigin and Mahmud. The al-Yamini starts in 965 CE, but the Samanids are not mentioned until Nuh ibn Mansur's reign in 976, while it details the Buyids prior to 983. Utbi had direct knowledge of Sultan Mahmud's personality and the actions of his officials, and he was well-informed about the background of Mahmud's campaigns in India, though he likely never took part in those expeditions himself. His work recounts the rise of Ghaznavid power under Sebuktegin and details Mahmud's character and military achievements up to the year 1020. Utbi was unfamiliar with Indian languages and had a poor grasp of Indian geography, leading to numerous errors in his accounts of Mahmud's Indian campaigns.

According to the historian al-Tha'alibi, al-Utbi wrote numerous works, which included poetry. His sole surviving work is the Kitab al-Yamini. Jurji Zaydan's Tarikh Adab al-Lughat al-Arabiya, regarded the al-Yamini superior in style to al-Tha'alibi's Yatima, while stating it was comparable to Hilal al-Sabi's Tarikh al-Wuzara.

== Sources ==
- Bosworth, C.E. (2000a). "Al-Utbi". In Bearman, P.J.; Bianquis, TH.; Bosworth, C. E.; Van Donzel, E.; Heinrichs, W. P. (eds.). Encyclopaedia of Islam. Vol. X: T-U. Brill. p. 945. ISBN 90 04 11211 1.
- Bosworth, C. Edmund (Winter–Spring 2000b). "Sistan and Its Local Histories". Iranian Studies. 33 (1/2). JSTOR 4311333.
- Khan, M. S. (October–December 1969). "Miskawaih and Arabic Historiography". Journal of the American Oriental Society. 89 (4). JSTOR 596943.
- Khan, M.S. (1976). "al-Bīrūnī and the Political History of India". Oriens. 25/26. JSTOR 1580658.
- Levi, Scott C.; Sela, Ron, eds. (2010). Islamic Central Asia: An Anthology of Historical Sources. Indiana University Press. ISBN 978-0-253-35385-6.
- Mehta, J.L. (1986). Advanced Study in the History of Medieval India. Vol. I: 1000-1526 A.D. Sterling Publishers. ISBN 978 81 207 0617 0.
- Nazim, M. (1993). "Al-Utbi, Abu Nasr Muhammad b. Muhammad al-Djabbar". In Houtsma, M. Th.; Wensinck, A.J.; Gibb, H.A.R.; Heffening, W.; Levi-Provencal, E. (eds.). First Encyclopaedia of Islam, 1913-1936. Vol. VIII: Ta'if-Zurkhana. Brill. pp. 1059–1060. ISBN 90 04 09794 5.
- Shagrir, Iris; Goldberg, Ilana (2019). The Parable of the Three Rings and the Idea of Religious Toleration in European Culture. Springer International Publishing. ISBN 978-3-030-29695-7.
