= Chandradeva =

Indian king, ruled c. 1072 – c. 1103

- Parama-bhattaraka Maharajadhiraja Parameshvara Parama-Maheshvara

Gahadavala king
- Reign: c. 1089 – c. 1103 CE
- Successor: Madanapala
- Issue: Madanapala
- Dynasty: Gahadavala
- Father: Mahichandra

Chandradeva (IAST: Candradeva, ruled c. 1089 – c. 1103 CE), also known as Chandraditya, was an Indian king from the Gahadavala dynasty. He ruled the Antarvedi country in present-day Uttar Pradesh, including Kanyakubja and Varanasi.

Although the Gahadavala inscriptions mention two of his ancestors, he was the first sovereign monarch of his family. Amid the chaos resulting from the decline of Kalachuri power and Ghaznavid invasions, Chandradeva established a government in the Kanyakubja-Varanasi region of the Gangetic plains.

== Rise to power ==
Location of Chandrawati (or Chandravati), where inscriptions of Chandradeva have been found

According to the Gahadavala inscriptions, Chandradeva was a son of Mahichandra (alias Mahitala or Mahiyala), and a grandson of Yashovigraha.

The Gahadavala inscriptions give the titles and name of Chandradeva as "Parama-bhattaraka Maharajadhiraja Parameshvara Parama-Maheshvara Shriman Chandra-deva". They portray Chandradeva as the saviour of the earth (that is, the region which they ruled). The 1104 CE Bashai (Basahi) inscription states that Chandradeva saved the distressed earth, after the death of Bhoja and the destruction of Karna's fame. The 1109 Rahin (or Rahan) inscription states that Chandradeva was born after the destruction of the solar and the lunar Kshatriya dynasties, when the voice of the Vedas had almost disappeared. These descriptions suggest that the region suffered from chaos during the interregnum following the deaths of Bhoja (r. c. 1010-1055 CE) and Karna (r. c. 1038-1080 CE), probably as a result of the Turushka (Ghaznavid) invasions.

In these troubled times, Chandradeva established a new government, and brought peace to the region. The 1093 CE Chandrawati inscription states that Chandradeva's dynasty captured Kanyakubja, after the destruction of the descendants of the Gurjara-Pratihara king Devapala. In his 1090 CE Chandrawati inscription, Chandradeva assumes the imperial title Parama-bhattaraka Maharajadhiraja Parameshvara, which indicates that he had become a sovereign by this time.

== Territorial extent ==
The 1090 CE Chandrawati inscription states that Chandradeva protected (that is, ruled) the sacred places of Kashi (Varanasi), Kushika (Kannauj), Uttara Koshala (the area around Ayodhya) and Indrasthaniyaka. The identification of Indrasthaniyaka is not certain, but some scholars believe it to be Delhi (see Indraprastha). According to historian Roma Niyogi, it is possible that the Tomara rulers of Delhi acknowledged the suzerainty of the Gahadavalas. If this assumption is true, then Chandradeva's kingdom extended from Delhi in the north-west to Varanasi in the south-east. However, P. C. Roy does not find this theory convincing. He points out that Delhi was ruled by the Tomara and then the Chahamanas according to historical records, none of which mention the Gahadavalas as rulers of Delhi. Rahin village in Etawah district is the furthest point in the north-west where a Gahadavala inscription has been discovered. Therefore, Roy argues that Indrasthaniyaka should be identified with a place other than Delhi.

The Yamuna river formed the southern boundary of Chandradeva's kingdom; the northern boundary probably did not go far beyond the Ganga river.

According to the 1104 CE Bashai inscription of his successor Madanapala, Chandradeva established his capital at Kanyakbuja. No other Gahadavala inscription mentions Kanyakubja as the kingdom's capital, and the vast majority of the dynasty's inscriptions have been found in and around Varanasi. According to Al-Biruni, most of the Kanyakubja city was in ruins by 1030 CE. Therefore, it appears that Varanasi was the chief seat of Gahadavala power. Chandradeva probably moved his capital to Kanyakubja, since that city was reputed as the capital of earlier emperors. Thus, Kanyakubja became a 'capital of honour' for the Gahadavalas, although Varanasi remained their main seat of power.

== Military career ==
The 1093 CE Chandrawati inscription states that Chandradeva defeated Narapati, Gajapati, Giripati and Trishankupati. These appear to be different classes of feudatories; "Narapati" and "Gajapati" have been used as imperial titles in some Kalachuri inscriptions. Since the Kalachuris controlled the area around Varanasi before the Gahadavalas, it appears that Chandradeva captured this area from them. The Kalachuri king defeated by him was probably Yashah-Karna.

The 1093 CE and 1100 CE inscriptions of Chandradeva mention that his vast army marched in the east (the eastern India). However, no records attribute any military successes to him in the east. It is possible that he unsuccessfully tried to invade the Pala territory. According to Ramacharitam, Ramapala's feudatory in Magadha — Bhimayashas — defeated the ruler of Kanyakubja. This ruler was most probably Chandradeva.

== Religion ==
One of Chandradeva's inscription describes him as "Svayambhu himself born upon the earth to restore dharma and the Veda, whose sounds had almost been silenced." An inscription of his grandson Govindachandra describes him as Hari (Vishnu) born on the earth at the request of Hara (Shiva) to protect Varanasi from "the wicked Turk warrior". The 1197 Kotwa (Machhlishahr) inscription of the last Gahadavala ruler Harishchandra describes Chandradeva as the protector of several holy places including Kashi (Varnaasi).

The inscriptions of Chandradeva, discovered at Chandrawati (or Chandravati) in Varanasi district, record grants to hundreds of Brahmins. His 1093 CE (1150 VS) Chandrawati copper-plate inscription mentions that he visited Ayodhya to worship Vasudeva (Vishnu) and perform other religious rites. The Ayodhya-mahatmya section of the Vrindavan manuscript of the Skanda Purana mentions that the Vasudeva temple at the Svarga-dvara ghata in Ayodhya had an idol named "Chandra-hari", believed to be installed by a pilgrim named Chandra, who had visited Ayodhya to worship Vishnu. This may be a reference to Chandradeva's construction of a temple and the installation of an idol there.

== Inscriptions ==
The following inscriptions from Chandradeva's reign have been discovered:

Date of issue (CE)	Place of discovery	Issued at	Issued by	Purpose
7 November 1090	Varanasi district: Chandrawati	Sauri-Narayana	Chandradeva	Village grant, lunar eclipse
23 October 1093	Varanasi district: Chandrawati	Ayodhya	Chandradeva	Village grants to 500 Brahmins
8 January 1098	Unknown	Varanasi (Trilochana Ghatta)	Chandradeva	Village grant made by Chandradeva in 1098 CE. Inscription issued by Madanapala after his death.
14 April 1100	Varanasi district: Chandrawati	Varanasi (Adikeshava Ghatta)	Chandradeva	Village grants to 500 Brahmins and Chandra-Madhava temple
