= India's Struggle for Independence =

1987 book

- Authors: Bipan Chandra; Mridula Mukherjee; Aditya Mukherjee; Sucheta Mahajan; K. N. Panikkar
- Language: English
- Publisher: Penguin Random House
- Publication date: 1987
- Publication place: India
- Media type: print
- ISBN: 9780140107814

India's Struggle for Independence is a book written by historians Bipan Chandra, Mridula Mukherjee, Aditya Mukherjee, Sucheta Mahajan, and K. N. Panikkar, and published by Penguin Random House in 1987. The book examines the Indian independence movement.

== Reception ==
=== 'Revolutionary Terrorist' controversy ===
Bhagat Singh along with Chandra Shekhar Azad, Surya Sen and others have been referred as 'revolutionary terrorist' in chapter 20 of book. Bhagat Singh's family objected the use of term in April of 2016. In parliamentary upper house Rajya Sabha, K. C. Tyagi, Janata Dal (United) politician, demanded to delete "objectionable references" for Bhagat Singh. P. J. Kurien, deputy chairman of house, urged government to remove all references which refer Bhagat Singh as "revolutionary terrorist" which was assured by Mukhtar Abbas Naqvi, then Ministry of Parliamentary Affairs. Samajwadi Party politician Naresh Agarwal along with BJP MPs demanded action against authors while Left MPs opposed it in Rajya Sabha.

In May 2016, Hindutva activist Dinanath Batra wrote a letter to HRD Ministry to sought ban on the book for the very same reason. He also demanded action against Delhi University officials who printed it in Hindi.

Mridula Mukherjee, co-author of the book had clarified that word didn't have a pejorative meaning when it was published. Professors of Jawaharlal Nehru University claimed that Bipan Chandra praised Bhagat Singh when he referred him as 'revolutionary terrorist'. Later, the book was red-flagged by the Delhi University. Indian History Congress had passed a resolution in favor of book and demanded to end 'virtual ban' on the book in 2017.
