= Bhagwan Singh Josh =

Bhagwan Josh
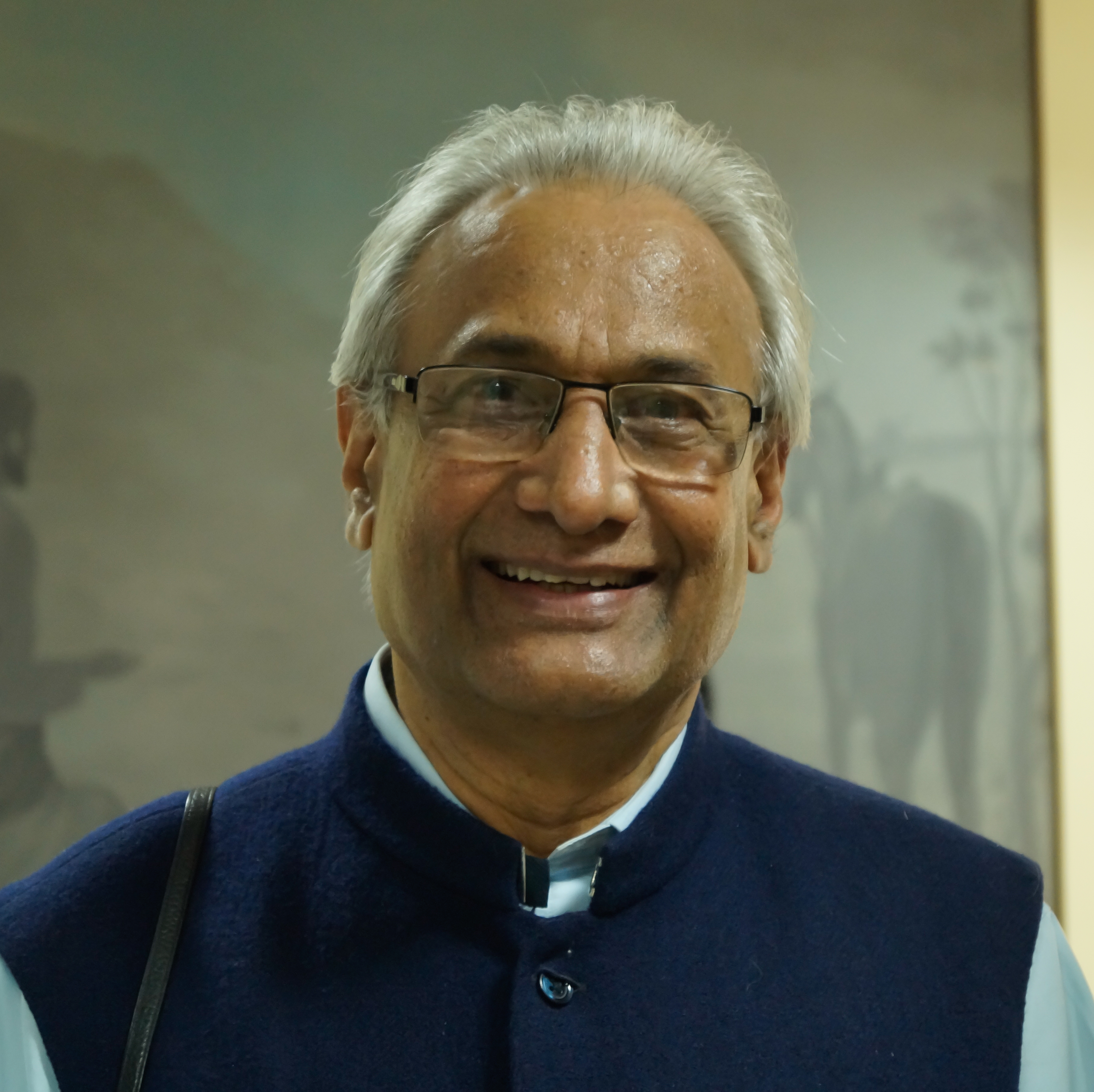
- Born: 1949 (age 76–77) bhagsar
- Citizenship: Indian
- Education: Panjab University, Chandigarh; Jawaharlal Nehru University, New Delhi
- Scientific career
- Fields: History

Bhagwan Singh Josh (born 1949) is an Indian historian, specialising in social and political history of modern India. He is Professor of Contemporary History at the Centre for Historical Studies, Jawaharlal Nehru University, New Delhi. He is one of the project committee members of the Europe–South Asia Maritime Heritage Project. He has also been co-director of the Indian Council of Social Science Research (ICSSR) project, History of the Indian National Congress, 1885–1947. He has specialized on the Indian national liberation movement and is considered to be one India's foremost scholars on communist movements in India. His best known book is Struggle for Hegemony in India which combines the various perspectives of India's history—the colonial state, the various political parties, the trade unions, and the mobilization of the work force—to form a cohesive whole on the basis of Antonio Gramsci's hegemonic concepts.

== See also ==
- Marxist historiography
- Bipan Chandra
