= Daudhar =

- village
- location in Punjab, India
- Coordinates: 30.724313°N 75.341277°E
- country: India
- States and union territories of India: Punjab
- District: Moga
- Founder: Daud rai 1233
- Block: Moga-1

Population
  - Total: 28,345

languages
  - official: Punjabi (Gurmukhi)
  - Regional: Punjabi
- Time zone: UTC+5:30 (IST)
- PIN: 142053
- Vehicle registration: Pb 29

Daudhar is one of the biggest village in the Punjab, India, with a population of 10,222 in 2011. Daudhar is divided into two parts; one is known as Daudhar Garbhi and another part is known as Daudhar Sharki. There are two Sarpanch in Daudhar. A historical Gurudwara of Guru Hargobind Sahib ji is situated in Daudhar. Pind Daudhar is famous for its Babe ke Medical College. Daudhar has a hockey team, football team, kabaddi team. Punjabi is the mother tongue as well as the official language of the village, predominated by the Jatt people. It is in Moga district, Block Moga-1. Daudhar is 16 km (9.9 mi) from Jagroan and 20 km (12 mi) from Moga.

== History of Vada Dera Daudhar ==
Daudhar Dera, a school for training Sikh musicians popularly known as Vadda Dera, was established in 1859 by Sant Suddh Singh (d. 1882) at Daudhar, village in Faridkot district of the Punjab. Suddh Singh was a disciple of Thakur Didar Singh, a Nirmala saint of Manuke, with whom he studied Sikh texts. According to local tradition, a chance meeting with a bairagi sadhu, formerly a court musician to a chief in Uttar Pradesh from where he had migrated at the time of the uprising of 1857, led Suddh Singh to invite him to his Dera to teach classical music to the inmates.

Mahant Vir Singh (d. 1902), who succeeded Suddh Singh as head of the Dera, was himself an accomplished musician. He and his equally talented disciple Khushal Singh trained their pupils in the subtleties of Sikh devotional music, instrumental as well as vocal. The instruments taught were saranda, sitar, tanpura, taus, tabla and dholaki (drums); cymbals, chimta khartals (concussion); and harmonium. The next mahant or head priest, Mangal Singh (c. 1860-1937), himself an adept at playing tabia, not only continued instruction in devotional and classical music but also added to the curriculum lessons in recitation and interpretation of the Guru Granth Sahib, in Gurmukhi calligraphy and in classical Punjabi prosody.

He admitted to the Dera the blind, the crippled and the orphans, whose number during his time rose to about 150. Free board and lodging were provided for them. The Dera set up branches at some other villages such as Badhni Khurd, Maliana, Buttar and Jagraon. After the death on 28 July 1937 of Mahant Mangal Singh the pace of activity slackened somewhat, and yet the daily routine of kirtan in the morning, followed by katha or discourse on gurbani, and chauki or a session of kirtan in the evening continues, with the Guru ka Langar catering to the needs of the inmates, casual visitors and travellers. Special congregations mark important days on the Sikh calendar and the death anniversary of Mahant Mangal Singh.
