= Vidya Dhar Mahajan =

Indian historian, political scientist, and advocate

- Born: 1913; Punjab, British India
- Died: 10 July 1990 (aged 76–77); New Delhi, India
- Occupations: Historian; Political Scientist; Advocate
- Spouse: Savitri Shori Mahajan
- Children: Mridula Mukherjee (daughter); Sucheta Mahajan (daughter) Ajay Mahajan (son)

Academic background
- Education: Master of Arts (History and Political Science); Doctor of Philosophy; Bachelor of Laws
- Alma mater: D.A.V. College, Lahore; Punjab University Law College, Lahore; University of Delhi
- Thesis: Executive Control Over Municipalities in the Punjab (Ph.D.)

Academic work
- Discipline: History; Political Science; Law
- Institutions: Former professor of "history and politics" at the Sanatan Dharma College in Lahore, British India (now in Pakistan); Former professor of history at the Panjab University in Chandigarh, Independent India; Advocate at the Supreme Court of India

Vidya Dhar Mahajan (1913 — 10 July 1990) was an Indian historian, political scientist, and advocate.

== Biography ==
Mahajan was born in 1913 in the Punjab Province of British India. He did M.A. twice – in History at the D.A.V. College, Lahore and in Political Science and Law at the Punjab University Law College. In 1945, he completed Ph.D. in Political Science from the University of the Punjab, and later did Law from the University of Delhi. He served as a professor of "history and politics" at the Sanatan Dharma College in Lahore, and later as a professor of history at the Pantas U. College in New Delhi and at the Panjab University in Chandigarh. Mahajan was a member of the Indian History Congress Association. He studied India's early, ancient, modern, and constitutional history. He also studied the Indian nationalist movement and international politics. He was also an advocate at the Supreme Court of India.

He was married to Savitri Shori Mahajan who was a historian. Their daughters Sucheta Mahajan and Mridula Mukherjee are also historians. Sucheta and Mridula have been professors of history at the Jawaharlal Nehru University's Centre for Historical Studies. Sucheta had been a visiting scholar at the College of Wooster in Ohio and Fondation Maison des Sciences de l'Homme (Foundation House of Human Sciences) in Paris. Mahajan died on 10 July 1990 at the age of around 77 years.

== Written work ==
In The Constitution of India (1954), Mahajan presented an "analytical objective study" of India's constitution. In the book, he also briefly summarized the statements of India's Supreme Court and High Courts on 18 cases which declared the constitutional law on "important controversial matters". Assessing his work, Vidya Dhar Chaturvedi stated that he treated the subject matter in a "logical and lucid" manner. According to Chaturvedi, he was "not wedded to any political dogma, or party" and that his work was "free from doctrinaire or party bias". Assessing Mahajan's International Law (1956), D. R. Bhandari stated that he provided a detailed study of the topics in International Law and presented opinions of various scholars on them. Bhandari, while noting the Joseph Gabriel Starke dismissed the Law of War "in a few pages", opined that Mahajan did "full justice to it". According to Bhandari, Mahajan gave "equal attention to both the aspects of the law of nations viz., the Law of Peace and the Law of War".

Mahajan's Chief Justice Gajendragadkar (1966) was a legal biography of the former Chief Justice of India P. B. Gajendragadkar. K. M. Sharma noted that, along with other biographical details, Mahajan presented a "trend analysis" of his thoughts as unveiled through his judgements in the court and pronouncements outside the court but did not provide an in-depth analysis of his decisions and his other works. Mahajan's General Clauses Acts: Central and States was primarily a Case law study with the General Clauses Act, 1897 as its subject matter. It also covered the Adoption of Law Orders, the English Act, and the State General Clauses Acts. Assessing the book, (Note: Assessed the 6th edition which was published in 1990.) P. M. Bakshi (then-member of the Law Commission of India) stated that Mahajan did not organize the work on a number of clauses under enough headings and sub-headings. Bakshi noted that he also focused on the "questions which are normally dealt with in books devoted to general rules of statutory interpretation", resulting in their limited coverage in the book. The Law Commission of India suggested that the book would have been better titled as "Interpretation of Statute or some similar expression".

=== On Germany Between Two Wars ===
Mahajan described Lindley Fraser's Germany Between Two Wars (1944) as a propaganda work which was written to serve the BBC and was of the view that its excerpts were broadcast to the Germans with the motive of influencing the opinion of the Germans in favor of the Allies. Mahajan suggested that Fraser did a "good survey" of the history of Germany from 1918 to 1939 but presented the Armistice of 11 November 1918, the defence of settlements from Paris Peace Conference (1919–1920) by the Allies, the factors responsible for Adolf Hitler's rise to power in 1933, the preparation for war by the Nazi Germany from 1933 to 1939, and the circumstances which lead to Hitler's declaration of war against Britain in 1939 in "a lucid style". According to Mahajan, Fraser laid "no claim to originality and impartiality".

== Works ==
=== Books ===
- Mahajan, Vidya Dhar (2018) [First published 1991]. History of Medieval India: Muslim Rule in India – Sultanate Period Mughal Period (11th, revised, enlarged ed.). New Delhi, India: S. Chand. ISBN 978-8121903646. OCLC 1240697987.
- Mahajan, Vidya Dhar (2016) [First published 1960]. Ancient India (revised ed.). New Delhi, India: S. Chand. ISBN 978-9352531325. OCLC 1000593117.
- Mahajan, Vidya Dhar (2000). India Since 1526 (17th, revised, enlarged ed.). New Delhi, India: S. Chand. ISBN 978-8121911450. OCLC 956763986.
- Mahajan, Vidya Dhar (1995). Modern Indian History (17th, revised, enlarged ed.). New Delhi, India: S. Chand. ISBN 978-8121904988. OCLC 896649265.
- Mahajan, Vidya Dhar; Mahajan, Savitri (1971). Constitutional History of India: Including the Nationalist Movement (8th, revised, enlarged ed.). New Delhi, India: S. Chand. OCLC 258677576.

=== Selected papers ===
- Mahajan, Vidya Dhar (July–September 1944). Prasad, Beni (ed.). "Some Aspects of Gokhale's Political Thought". The Indian Journal of Political Science. 6 (1). Indian Political Science Association: 18–27. JSTOR 42753605.
- Mahajan, Vidya Dhar (July–September 1943). Prasad, Beni (ed.). "The Working of the Punjab and North–West Frontier Province Joint Public Service Commission". The Indian Journal of Political Science. 5 (1). Indian Political Science Association: 84–93. JSTOR 42743055.
