= Indian feudalism =

India's social structure till the 20th century

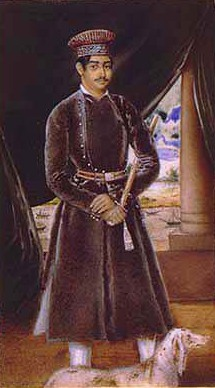
Mehtab Chand (1820–79), the zamindar of the Burdwan feudal estate in Bengal.

Indian feudalism refers to the feudal society that made up India's social structure until the formation of the Republic of India in the 20th century.

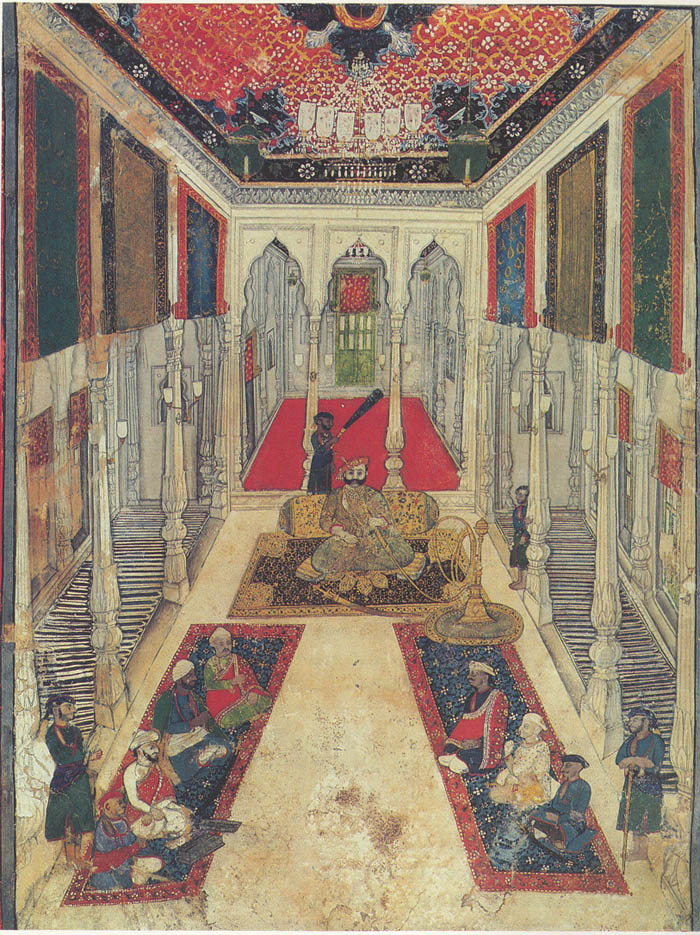
A Maratha Durbar showing the King (Raja) and the nobles (Sardars, Jagirdars, Istamuradars & Mankaris) of the princely state.

== Terminology ==
Use of the term feudalism to describe India applies a concept of medieval European origin, according to which the landed nobility held lands from the Crown in exchange for military service, and vassals were in turn tenants of the nobles, while the peasants (villeins or serfs) were obliged to live on their lord's land and give him homage, labor, and a share of the produce, notionally in exchange for military protection. The term Indian feudalism is used to describe taluqdars, zamindars, and jagirdars. Most of these systems were abolished after the independence of India and the rest of the subcontinent. D. D. Kosambi and R. S. Sharma, together with Daniel Thorner, brought peasants into the study of Indian history for the first time.

== Bihar ==
The Bihar region (now a state) of India was a hotbed for feudalism. Feudal lords ruled the region for decades; semi-feudal conditions still exist. As a result, child malnourishment is common, in spite of modern Bihar's status as having the fastest growth in gross domestic product in India.

== Bengal ==
The zamindars of Bengal managed plantation economy in the Bengal Presidency that produced cotton, jute, indigo, rice, wheat, tea, spices, and other commodities. Like the British landed gentry, they were bestowed with titles; their plantation economy has been studied by many scholars and can be compared with historic plantation complexes in the Southern United States. The land was cultivated by tenant farmers who paid rent to the zamindars. A big portion of the rent was in turn paid to the imperial government as taxes. The zamindars were the principal revenue collectors for the imperial administration under Mughal and British rule. The system was abolished by 1951.

== Telangana ==
The region implemented a feudal system known as the ‘Zamindari system’ and was largely controlled by doras and deshmukhs until Hyderabad's annexation. The landlords or feudal lords held large tracts of land in their fief and were responsible for collecting taxes from the peasants who worked the land, a portion of which would be paid to the Nizam of Hyderabad. The peasants were tenants under the feudal lords and cultivated this land, paying rent in the form of a share of their produce or money to the feudal lords. The peasants had very little security and were often subjected to high taxes, forced labor, and various forms of abuse and exploitation. The oppression experienced by the lower class in the Telangana region (now a state) ultimately led to the Telangana Rebellion against the feudal lords (known in Telugu as Vetti Chakiri Udhyamam) which took place from 1946 to 1951. The feudal lords used to reside in a high fortress called as Gadi, for entering it they leave their footwear at the threshold of the gadi. The Madigas and other lower castes were required to carry their footwear in their hands if they were passing in front of the gadi or dora.

The phrase "Banchen Dora née Kalmoktha“ became a popular saying during the rebellion, capturing the peasants’ deep-rooted resentment towards the feudal lords. The phrase literally means “I am your slave my lord, I bow to your feet" and reflected the severe exploitation of the peasants under the oppressive feudal system. Shyam Benegal's films Ankur and Nishant graphically depict feudalism in Telangana, while the Telugu film Maa Bhoomi accurately portrays the lifestyle of peasants under feudal lords as well as the socio-economic struggles which led to the rebellion.

The Srikrishna Committee on Telangana has stated in its findings that there is still gross injustice to the land tillers of the region, the villains, in this case, being the landlords of Telangana and not those of other regions.

== Kerala ==
There were a number of feudal states in Kerala in the Middle Ages and Early Modern Era between the rule of Chera dynasty and the British Raj (smaller feudal estates remained even during British rule). In Kerala, Kshatriyas, Nairs, and Samantha Kshatriyas were prominent during feudalism. Nairs acted as both feudal lords as well as warriors.

== Bombay ==
Initially, Bombay was inhabited by numerous tribes who lived in densely forested regions with no semblance of authority. However, sometime after the fall of the Yadavas of Devagiri, a feudal structure began emerging among these tribes. Many petty chieftains belonging to tribes such as the Gonds began ruling small areas in Madhya Pradesh which they sometimes fortified as a defensive measure against Islamic kingdoms such as the Malwa Sultanate and Bijapur Sultanate. Gond chieftains such as that of Lanji in Balaghat district ruled from strong forts called garhs. These tribal zamindars served their overlord kingdom in times of war but could also be a nuisance when they rebelled.

These zamindars enjoyed privileges under the native Gond kingdoms such as Garha-Mandla, Chanda and Deogarh. However, after the Maratha conquest of these regions by General Raghuji Bhonsle, these zamindars were displaced from the plains and were forced to retreat into the forest areas. They had to pay tribute to Raghuji Bhonsle and his descendants from then on, and often rebelled against the later oppressive Maratha rule. Many of these zamindars rebelled in the Revolt of 1857 against the English East India Company, were defeated, their leaders executed and the feudal lands annexed to direct British territory as a result. However, some of them were still ruling after 1857 but their family lines died out and those who survived gave up their estates in exchange for pensions.

== Madras Presidency ==
Several zamindaris were established in the Madras Presidency (present-day Tamil Nadu and adjoining areas) from 1799 onwards. The largest of these were Arni, Ramnad, Ganapur and Sivaganga. The zamindari settlement was based on a similar settlement established in Bengal. The Zamindari settlement of Madras was largely unsuccessful and was wrapped up in 1852. However, a few zamindaris remained till India's independence in 1947.

== North Arcot ==
North Arcot region was under jagirdars until the Indian independence. The largest estate was that of Arni, a Deshastha family. Arni estate was larger than Sandur princely state.

== Northern Andhra ==
The Northern Andhra region was under Telaga doras until the Indian independence. The largest estate was that of Vizianagaram under the Poosapati kshatriya family.

== Rayalaseema ==
The Rayalaseema region was under Ayyagaru until the independence. The largest estate was that of Panyam; which was ruled by a Deshastha family of Vishvamitra gotra (lineage).

== In literature ==
- Indian Feudalism by Ram Sharan Sharma
- Saraswatichandra by Govardhanram Madhavaram Tripathi, later adapted into film by the same name in 1968.

== See also ==
- Debt bondage in India
- Caste system in India
- Feudalism in Pakistan
- Princely states of India
- Zerat, Ryot

== Bibliography ==
- R.S. Sharma, Perspectives in Social and Economic History of Early India, paperback edn., (Munshiram Manoharlal, Delhi, 2003). Translated into Hindi, Russian and Bengali. Gujarati, Kannada, Malayalam, Marathi, Tamil and Telugu translations projected.
- R.S. Sharma, Material Culture and Social Formations in Ancient India, (Macmillan Publishers, Delhi, 1985). Translated into Hindi, Russian and Bengali. Gujarati, Kannada, Malayalam, Marathi, Tamil and Telugu translations projected.
- R.S. Sharma, Urban Decay in India (c.300-1000), (Munshiram Manoharlal, Delhi, 1987). Translated into Hindi and Bengali
- R.S. Sharma, Early Medieval Indian Society: A Study in Feudalisation (Orient Longman Publishers Pvt. Ltd., Delhi, 2003)
- R.S. Sharma, India's Ancient Past, (Oxford University Press, 2005, ISBN 978-0-19-568785-9)
- R.S. Sharma, Indian Feudalism (Macmillan Publishers India Ltd., 3rd Revised Edition, Delhi, 2005)
- R.S. Sharma, The State and Varna Formations in the Mid-Ganga Plains: An Ethnoarchaeological View (New Delhi, Manohar, 1996)
- R.S. Sharma, Origin of the State in India (Dept. of History, University of Bombay, 1989)
- R.S. Sharma, Land Revenue in India: Historical Studies, Motilal Banarsidass, Delhi, 1971
- Historiography of Indian Feudalism Towards a Model of Early Medieval Indian Economy, C. A.D. 600–1000, by Vijay Kumar Thakur. Commonwealth Publishers, 1989. ISBN 81-7169-032-7.
- Dora and. Gadi: Manifestation of Landlord Domination in Telangana, I Thirumali, 1992
- Against Dora and Nizam : People's Movement in Telangana 1939–1948, I Thirumali
- "Chillarollu's Defiances in Telangana, 1900–1944" Indian Historical Review, XXII, 1995–1996
- Origin and Growth of Feudalism in Early India: From the Mauryas to AD 650, by Gian Chand Chauhan. Munshiram Manoharlal Publishers, 2004. ISBN 81-215-1028-7.
