= Randhir Singh (academic) =

- Born: 11 January 1922; Manuke, Punjab, India
- Died: 31 January 2016 (aged 94); Delhi, India
- Education: University of the Punjab
- Occupation: Professor
- Known for: Marxist history
- Spouse: Mohinder Kaur
- Children: Shima, Priyaleen Singh

Randhir Singh (11 January 1922 – 31 January 2016) was a Marxist scholar, political theorist and teacher from India. He was born in Manuke in what was later the Moga district of Punjab, India, and was raised in Lahore, where his father was a doctor. He studied at Sikh National College, Lahore, and at University of the Punjab. He was a founder of the Indian student movement in the 1930s, was greatly influenced by Bhagat Singh, and was a freedom fighter who was jailed during India's freedom movement in the 1940s.

Singh joined the Communist Party of India before Partition, though it is unclear how long for.

After first teaching at Delhi College (now Zakir Hussain National College) for nearly 20 years and a brief stint at Jawaharlal Nehru University, Singh joined the Department of Political Science at Delhi University in 1972. He was one of the founders of the Delhi University Teachers Association. He retired from teaching in 1987.

Former Prime Minister of Nepal, Baburam Bhattarai has called him "one of the greatest Marxist scholars of our time."

Singh and Bipan Chandra brought out a Marxist research journal in the 1960s called Enquiry.

He was related to Gursharan Singh by marriage.

== Publications ==
- Ghadar Heroes: A Forgotten Story of the Punjab Revolutionaries of 1914-15 (1945)
- Rahan Di Dhudh (Dust of the Paths) (1950)
- Reason, Revolution and Political Theory: Notes on Oakeshott's Rationalism in Politics (1976)
- Of Marxism and Indian Politics (1990)
- Five Lectures in Marxist Mode (1993)
- Crisis of Socialism: Notes in Defence of a Commitment (2006)
- Contemporary Ecological Crisis: A Marxist View (2006)
- Marxism, Socialism, Indian Politics: A View from the Left (2008)
- Indian Politics Today: An Argument for Socialism-Oriented Path of Development (2009)
- Contemporary ecological crisis: a Marxist View (2009)
- On Nationalism and Communalism in India (2010)
- Struggle for socialism: some issues (2010)
- The World After the Collapse of the Soviet Union (2011)
- What was built and what failed in the Soviet Union (2011)
- The right lesson and the wrong conclusion (2011)
- Selected Writings of Randhir Singh (2017)
