= Ram Sharan Sharma =

Indian historian and Indologist (1919–2011)

- Born: 26 November 1919; Barauni, Bihar and Orissa Province, British India
- Died: 20 August 2011 (aged 91); Patna, Bihar, India
- Known for: Indian Historiography
- Awards: Vishwanath Kashinath Rajwade Award, H. K. Barpujari Award

Academic background
- Education: University of Patna, School of Oriental and African Studies
- Thesis: Sudras in Ancient India (1956)
- Doctoral advisor: A. L. Basham

Academic work
- Discipline: Ancient India, Early Medieval India

Ram Sharan Sharma (26 November 1919 – 20 August 2011) was a Marxist historian and Indologist who specialised in the history of Ancient and early Medieval India. He taught at Patna University and Delhi University (1973–85) and was visiting faculty at University of Toronto (1965–1966). He also was a senior fellow at the School of Oriental and African Studies, University of London. He was a University Grants Commission National Fellow (1958–81) and the president of Indian History Congress in 1975. It was during his tenure as the dean of Delhi University's History Department that major expansion of the department took place in the 1970s. The creation of most of the positions in the department were the results of his efforts. He was the founding Chairman of the Indian Council of Historical Research (ICHR) and a historian of international repute.

During his lifetime, he authored 115 books published in fifteen languages. He influenced major decisions relating to historical research in India in his roles as head of the departments of History at Patna and Delhi University, as Chairman of the Indian Council of Historical Research, as an important member of the National Commission of the History of Sciences in India and UNESCO Commission on the history of Central Asian Civilizations and of the University Grants Commission and, above all, as a practising historian. At the instance of Sachchidananda Sinha, when Professor Sharma was in Patna College, he worked as a special officer on deputation to the Political Department in 1948, where prepared a report on the Bihar-Bengal Boundary Dispute. His pioneering effort resolved the border dispute forever as recorded by Sachchinand Sinha in a letter to Rajendra Prasad.

== Early life ==
Sharma was born in Barauni, Begusarai, Bihar in a poor family. With great difficulty his father sponsored his education till matriculation. After that he kept on getting scholarships and even did private tuition to support his education. In his youth he came in contact with peasant leaders like Karyanand Sharma and Sahajanand Saraswati and scholars like Rahul Sankrityayan and perhaps from them he imbibed the determination to fight for social justice and an abiding concern for the downtrodden which drew him to left ideology. His later association with Dr. Sachchidananda Sinha, a social reformer and journalist, broadened his mental horizon and firmly rooted him in the reality of rural India and thus strengthened his ties with the left movement and brought him into the front rank of anti-imperialist and anti-communal intellectuals of the country.

Sharma was foremost among the Indian intellectuals who wanted historians to realise that the discipline of history was not just about what happened in the past but what its lessons were for imaginatively and intelligently responding to the challenges of the present.

== Education and achievements ==
He passed matriculation in 1937 and joined Patna College, where he studied for six years from intermediate to postgraduate classes. He did his PhD from the School of Oriental and African Studies, University of London under Professor A. L. Basham. His PhD thesis on the history of Sudras in Ancient India was published as a book by Motilal Banarsidass in 1958, with a revised edition in 1990.

Sharma taught at colleges in Arrah (1943) and Bhagalpur (July 1944 to November 1946) before coming to Patna College, Patna University in 1946. He became the head of the Department of History at Patna University from 1958 to 1973. He became a university professor in 1958. He served as professor and dean of the History Department at Delhi University from 1973 to 1978. He got the Jawaharlal Fellowship in 1969. He was the founding chairperson of Indian Council of Historical Research from 1972 to 1977. He has been a visiting fellow at the School of Oriental and African Studies (1959–64); University Grants Commission National Fellow (1958–81); visiting professor of history in University of Toronto (1965–66); President of Indian History Congress in 1975 and recipient of Jawaharlal Nehru Award in 1989. He became the deputy-chairperson of UNESCO's International Association for Study of Central Asia from 1973 to 1978; he has served as an important member of the National Commission of History of Sciences in India and a member of the University Grants Commission.

Sharma got the Campbell Memorial Gold Medal (for outstanding Indologist) for 1983 by the Asiatic Society of Bombay in November 1987; received the H. K. Barpujari Biennial National Award by Indian History Congress for Urban Decay in India in 1992 and worked as national fellow of the Indian Council of Historical Research (1988–91). He was a member of many academic committees and associations. He has also been recipient of the K. P. Jayaswal Fellowship of the K. P. Jayaswal Research Institute, Patna (1992–94); he was invited to receive Hem Chandra Raychaudhuri Birth Centenary Gold Medal for outstanding historian from Asiatic Society in August 2001; and in 2002 the Indian History Congress gave him the Vishwanath Kashinath Rajwade Award for his lifelong service and contribution to Indian history. He got D.Litt. (Honoris Causa) from The University of Burdwan and a similar degree from Central Institute of Higher Tibetan Studies, Sarnath, Varanasi. He was also the president of the editorial group of the scholastic magazine Social Science Probings. He was a member of the board of Khuda Bakhsh Oriental Public Library. His works have been translated into many Indian languages apart from being written in Hindi and English. Fifteen of his works have been translated into Bengali. Apart from Indian languages many of his works have been translated into many foreign languages like Japanese, French, German, Russian, etc.

In the opinion of fellow historian Professor Irfan Habib, "D. D. Kosambi and R. S. Sharma, together with Daniel Thorner, brought peasants into the study of Indian history for the first time." Prof. Dwijendra Narayan Jha published a book in his honour in 1996, titled "Society and Ideology in India: ed. Essays in Honour of Professor R. S. Sharma" (Munshiram Manoharlal, Delhi, 1996). In his honour, a selection of essays was published by the K. P. Jaiswal Research Institute, Patna in 2005.

Journalist Sham Lal writes about him, "R. S. Sharma, a perceptive historian of Ancient India, has too great a regard for the truth about the social evolution in India over a period of two thousand years, stretching from 1500 BC to 500 AD, to take refuge in a world of make-believe."

Professor Sumit Sarkar opines: "Indian historiography, starting with D. D. Kosambi in the 1950s, is acknowledged the world over – wherever South Asian history is taught or studied – as quite on a par with or even superior to all that is produced abroad. And that is why Irfan Habib or Romila Thapar or R. S. Sharma are figures respected even in the most diehard anti-Communist American universities. They cannot be ignored if you are studying South Asian history."

== As an institution builder ==
Impatient with inefficiency and guided by his radicalism, Sharma had experience as a builder of institutions. Under his guidance the department of History, Patna University, drastically changed its syllabi and made a sharp departure from the communal and imperialist historiographical legacy of the colonial period. He invigorated the department which was suffering from inertia and of initiating academic programmes which gave a distinct character to the History department of Patna University and thereby bringing it into the vanguard of secular and scientific historiography.

In Delhi, where he spent a smaller part of his teaching career, Sharma's achievements are no less significant. The development of the department of History, Delhi University, owes a great deal to the efforts of Professor Sharma who radicalised it by converting it into a citadel of secular and scientific History and waged an all out war against communalist historiography.

It is largely because of his efforts that the largest body of professional Indian historians, the Indian History Congress, of which he was the general president in 1975 and which honoured him with H.K. Barpujari Award in 1989, has now become the symbol of secular and scientific approach to History.

== Writing style ==
In his writings Professor Sharma has focused on early Indian social structure, material and economic life, state formation and political ideas and the social context of religious ideologies and has sought to underline the historical processes which shaped Indian culture and civilisation. In his study of each of these aspects of Ancient Indian History he has laid stress on the elements of change and continuity. This has significantly conditioned his methodology which basically rests on a critical evaluation of sources and a correlation between literary texts with archaeology and ethnography. His methodology is being increasingly extended to the study of various aspects of Indian history just as the problems studied by him and the questions raised by him have generated a bulk of historical literature in recent years.

== Major works ==
- Aspects of Political Ideas and Institutions in Ancient India (Motilal Banarsidass, Fifth Revised Edition, Delhi, 2005)
- Sudras in Ancient India: A Social History of the Lower Order Down to Circa AD 600 (Motilal Banarsidass, Third Revised Edition, Delhi, 1990; Reprint, Delhi, 2002)
- India's Ancient Past (Oxford University Press, 2005)
- Looking for the Aryans (Orient Longman Publishers, 1995, Delhi)
- Indian Feudalism (Macmillan Publishers India Ltd., 3rd Revised Edition, Delhi, 2005)
- Early Medieval Indian Society: A Study in Feudalisation (Orient Longman Publishers Pvt. Ltd., Delhi, 2003)
- Perspectives in Social and Economic History of Ancient India (Munshiram Manoharlal, Delhi, 2003)
- Urban Decay in India c. 300- c. 1000 (Munshiram Manoharlal, Delhi, 1987)

=== Theory of Feudalism ===
The publication of his monograph Indian Feudalism in 1965 caused almost a furore in the academia, generating intense debate and sharp responses both in favour of and against the applicability of the model of "feudalism" to the Indian situation at any point of time. The concept of "feudalism" was initially used by D. D. Kosambi to analyse the developments in the socio-economic sphere in the late ancient and medieval periods of Indian history. Sharma, while differing from Kosambi on certain significant points, added a great deal of depth to the approach with his painstaking research and forceful arguments. The work has been called his magnum opus. Criticism goaded Sharma into reinforcing his thesis by producing another work of fundamental importance, Urban Decay in India (c.300-1000), in which he marshalled an impressive mass of archaeological data to demonstrate the decline of urban centres, a crucial element of his thesis on feudalism. It won him the H.K. Barpujari award instituted by the Indian History Congress. However, the redoubtable professor was unstoppable, and in his Early Medieval Indian Society: A Study in Feudalisation (Orient Longman, 2001), he further rebutted the objections of his critics point by point.

Sharma applied the tool of historical materialism not only to explain social differentiation and stages of economic development, but also to the realm of ideology. His investigations into the "feudal mind" and "economic and social basis of tantrism" are thought-provoking, opening up new lines of inquiry. In an earlier article, he examined "the material milieu of the birth of Buddhism", which now forms a part of his Material Culture and Social Formations in Ancient India (Macmillan, 1983). The monograph, full of seminal ideas, has been translated into several Indian and foreign languages and has had 11 editions.

=== Other writings ===
Sharma wrote two books, Looking for the Aryans (Orient Longman, 1995) and Advent of the Aryans in India (Manohar, 1999), "to demolish the myth assiduously cultivated by Hindu communalist historiography that the Aryans were the original inhabitants of India and Harappa culture was their creation." After that, Sharma was part of a Government of India appointed committee to examine the historical veracity of claims made regarding Ram Sethu by certain Hindus, that Ram Sethu was made by the Hindu God Ram and not a result of natural formation (the result of continuous wave action). Sharma, who was the historian on the committee, submitted his report in December 2007 and thus helped in defusing the crisis. Incidentally, work on the report occasioned his last visit to Delhi.

== Views on communalism ==
Sharma has denounced communalism of all types. In his booklet, Communal History and Rama's Ayodhya, he writes, "Ayodhya seems to have emerged as a place of religious pilgrimage in medieval times. Although chapter 85 of the Vishnu Smriti lists as many as 52 places of pilgrimage, including towns, lakes, rivers, mountains, etc., it does not include Ayodhya in this list." Sharma also notes that Tulsidas, who wrote the Ramcharitmanas in 1574 at Ayodhya, does not mention it as a place of pilgrimage nor does he refer to any temple of Rama in Ayodhya, let alone the Ramjanmabhumi temple. After the demolition of Babri masjid, he along with historians Suraj Bhan, M. Athar Ali and Dwijendra Narayan Jha came up with the Historian's report to the nation on how the communalists were mistaken in their assumption that there was a temple at the disputed site and how it was sheer vandalism in bringing down the mosque. However, the Supreme Court of India refused to give credence to this report and said, "At the highest, this report can be taken as an opinion."

== Political controversies ==
In 1977, Janata Dal banned his book Ancient India. The ban was withdrawn by Congress in 1980. In October 2001, the BJP government found seven out of ten passages of the book to be objectionable. Later, Sharma wrote the revised version of Ancient India and he tried to "incorporate new facts based on recent archeological findings".

He supported the addition of the Ayodhya dispute and the 2002 Gujarat riots to school syllabus calling them 'socially relevant topics' to broaden the horizons of youngsters. This was his remark when the NCERT decided to include the Gujarat riots and the Ayodhya dispute besides the 1984 anti-Sikh riots in the Class XII political science books, arguing that these events influenced the political process in the country since Independence.

== Reception ==
André Wink has criticised Sharma for drawing too close parallels between European and Indian feudalism and blames his works for "misguid[ing] virtually all historians of the period"; Sanjay Subrahmanyam deemed Wink's attacks to be polemical.

== Legacy ==
On his death, at a function organised by the Indian Council of Historical Research and hosted by the Nehru Memorial Museum and Library, historians Romila Thapar, Irfan Habib, D. N. Jha, Satish Chandra, Kesavan Veluthat and ICHR Chairperson Basudev Chatterji paid rich tributes to Sharma and emphasised his influence. Professor Bipan Chandra considered him to be "greatest historian of India", after D.D. Kosambi. Irfan Habib said, "D. D. Kosambi and R.S. Sharma, together with Daniel Thorner, brought peasants into the study of Indian history for the first time."

== Bibliography ==
=== Select bibliography of works in English ===
- Aspects of Political Ideas and Institutions in Ancient India, (Motilal Banarsidass, Fifth Revised Edition, Delhi, 2005), ISBN 81-208-0898-3. Translated into Hindi and Tamil.
- Sudras in Ancient India: A Social History of the Lower Order Down to Circa AD 600 (Motilal Banarsidass, Third Revised Edition, Delhi, 1990; Reprint, Delhi, 2002). Translated into Bengali, Hindi, Telugu, Kannada, Urdu and Marathi (two volumes).
- Perspectives in Social and Economic History of Early India, paperback edn., (Munshiram Manoharlal, Delhi, 2003). Translated into Hindi, Russian and Bengali.
- Material Culture and Social Formations in Ancient India, (Macmillan Publishers, Delhi, 1985). Translated into Hindi, Russian and Bengali.
- Urban Decay in India (c.300–1000), (Munshiram Manoharlal, Delhi, 1987). Translated into Hindi and Bengali.
- Advent of the Aryans in India (Manohar Publishers, Delhi, 2003)
- Early Medieval Indian Society: A Study in Feudalisation (Orient Longman Publishers Pvt. Ltd., Delhi, 2003)
- Higher Education, ISBN 81-7169-320-2.
- Looking for the Aryans, (Orient Longman, Madras, 1995, ISBN 81-250-0631-1).
- India's Ancient Past, (Oxford University Press, 2005, ISBN 978-0-19-568785-9).
- Indian Feudalism (Macmillan Publishers India Ltd., 3rd Revised Edition, Delhi, 2005).
- The State and Varna Formations in the Mid-Ganga Plains: An Ethnoarchaeological View (New Delhi, Manohar, 1996).
- Origin of the State in India (Dept. of History, University of Bombay, 1989)
- Land Revenue in India: Historical Studies, Motilal Banarsidass, Delhi, 1971.
- Light on Early Indian Society and Economy, Manaktala, Bombay, 1966.
- Survey of Research in Economic and Social History of India: a project sponsored by Indian Council of Social Science Research, Ajanta Publishers, 1986.
- Communal History and Rama's Ayodhya, People's Publishing House (PPH), 2nd Revised Edition, September 1999, Delhi. Translated into Bengali, Hindi, Kannada, Tamil, Telugu and Urdu. Two versions in Bengali.
- Social Changes in Early Medieval India (Circa A.D.500–1200), People's Publishing House, Delhi.
- In Defence of "Ancient India", People's Publishing House, Delhi.
- Rahul Sankrityayan and Social Change, Indian History Congress, 1993.
- Indo-European languages and historical problems (Symposia papers), Indian History Congress, 1994.
- Some economic aspects of the caste system in ancient India, Patna, 1952.
- Ancient India, a Textbook for Class XI, National Council of Educational Research and Training, 1980. Translated into Bengali, Hindi, Japanese, Korean, Kannada, Tamil, Telugu and Urdu. Revised and enlarged book as India's Ancient Past, (Oxford University Press, 2005, ISBN 978-0-19-568785-9).
- Transition from antiquity to the Middle Ages in India (K. P. Jayaswal memorial lecture series), Kashi Prasad Jayaswal Research Institute, Patna, 1992.
- A Comprehensive History of India: Volume Four, Part I: the Colas, Calukyas and Rajputs (AD 985–1206), sponsored by Indian History Congress, People's Publishing House, 1992, Delhi.
- Economic History of Early India, (Viva books, 2011, ISBN 978-81-309-1012-3).
- Rethinking India's Past, (Oxford University Press, 2009, ISBN 978-0-19-569787-2).

=== Select bibliography of works in Hindi ===
- Vishva Itihaas ki Bhumika, Volume I & II Patna, 1951–52.
- Vishva Itihaas ki Bhumika, (new revised edition in single volume), Rajkamal Prakashan, 2010.
- Bharatiya Samantvaad, Rajkamal Prakashan, Delhi.
- Prachin Bharat Mein Rajnitik Vichar Evam Sansthayen, Rajkamal Prakashan, Delhi.
- Prachin Bharat Mein Bhautik Pragati Evam Samajik Sanrachnayen, Rajkamal Prakashan, Delhi.
- Shudron Ka Prachin Itihaas, Rajkamal Prakashan, Delhi.
- Bharat Ke prachin Nagaron Ka Patan, Rajkamal Prakashan, Delhi.
- Purva Madhyakalin Bharat ka Samanti Samaj aur Sanskriti, Rajkamal Prakashan, Delhi.
- Prarambhik Bharat ka Parichay, Orient Blackswan, Delhi, 2004, ISBN 978-81-250-2651-8.
- Vishva Itihaas ki Bhumika, Rajkamal Prakashan, Delhi 2010.

=== Edited works ===
- Proceedings of Seminar on Undergraduate Teaching in History, Patna, 1968.
- Land Revenue in India, Historical Studies (Motilal Banarsidass, Delhi, 1970)
- Indian Society: Historical Probings (In Memory of D. D. Kosambi); Sponsored by Indian Council of Historical Research; Fourth Edition:December 1993; People's Publishing House (PPH) with eminent contributors like Arthur Llewellyn Basham, Irfan Habib, Romila Thapar, Bipan Chandra, Daniel H. H. Ingalls, Sr., A. K. Warder, Satish Chandra, Sumit Sarkar, Raymond Allchin, Bridget Allchin and others.
- A survey of research in Social and Economic history of India, (New Delhi: ICHR and Ajanta Press, 1986)
- Comprehensive History of India, IV, Part I, People's Publishing House, New Delhi, 1990.
- Comprehensive History of India, IV, Part II along with K. M. Shrimali, New Delhi, Manohar, 2008, 974 p., 124 ills., ISBN 81-7304-561-5.

=== Contributions in edited volumes ===
- "Feudal Elements in Rashtrakuta Polity". Journal of Bihar Research Society (Dr. T.P. Choudhary Volume, XLVI, 1960, pp. 241–52)
- "Historiography of the Ancient Indian Social Order", Historians of India, Pakistan and Ceylon, ed., C. H. Philips, Clarendon Press, Oxford, 1963, pp. 102–14.
- Articles on Town in Northern India (In alphabetical order from A to L) W.Grolier's International Encyclopedia, New York, 1963.
- "Land Grants and Early Indian Economic History", Readings in Economic History, ed., B.N. Ganguli, Asia Publishing House, Bombay, 1965.
- "Early Indian Feudalism (c.AD 400–1200)" Historical Writings in India, ed., Sarvepalli Gopal and Romila Thapar, India International Centre, New Delhi, 1963, pp. 70–75 also in Kunwar Mohammad Ashraf Memorial Volume, ed. Horst Krüger, Berlin, 1966.
- "Communication and Propaganda in Indian Civilization", Communication and change in the developing countries, ed., Daniel Lerner et al., Honolulu, East-West Centre Press, 1967.
- "Material Background of the Origins of Buddhism", Das Kapital Centenary Volume, eds., Mohit Sen and M.B. Rao, People's Publishing House, New Delhi, 1968, pp. 59–66.
- "Post-Gupta Polity in Bihar (c. AD 550–750)", Ramanath Jha Abhinandan Granth, Patna 1968, pp. 329–35.
- "Ancient Values and Modern Reform in the 19th Century Society", Ideas in History, ed., Bisheswer Prasad, Bombay, 1969.
- "Feudal Elements in Pala and Pratihara Polity", Studies in Asian History (Proceedings of the Asian History Congress 1961), ed., K. S. Lal, Asia Publishing House, Bombay, 1969.
- "An Approach to Astrology and Divination in Medieval India", New Indology, Walter Ruben Volume, Berlin, 1970.
- "Central Asia and Early Indian Cavalry (c.200 BC-AD 1200)", Central Asia, Amalendu Guha, ICCR, New Delhi, 1970.
- "Material Milieu of Tantricism", Indian Society, Historical Probings (in memory of D. D. Kosambi), ed., R.S. Sharma and Vivekanand Jha, People's Publishing House, New Delhi, 1974.
- "Economic and Social Conditions under the Guptas", The Comprehensive History of Bihar, ed., B.P. Sinha, K.P. Jayaswal Research Institute, Patna, 1974.
- "Government and Political Institutions (550–1200 AD)", The Comprehensive History of Bihar, ed., B.P. Sinha, K.P. Jayaswal Research Institute, Patna, 1974.
- "Gupta Administration", The Comprehensive History of Bihar, ed., B.P. Sinha, K.P. Jayaswal Research Institute, Patna, 1974.
- "Social and Economic Conditions (500–1200 AD)", The Comprehensive History of Bihar, ed., B.P. Sinha, K.P. Jayaswal Research Institute, Patna, 1974.
- "Stages in the Evolution of Early Indian Society", Man and Scientist: Essays in Honour of Professor Balbhadra Prasad, ed., G.P. Sinha et al., People's Publishing House, New Delhi, 1979, pp. 205–14.
- "The Social Economic Bases of 'Oriental Despotism' in Early India", Essays in Honour of Dr. Gyanchand, ed., S.K. Bose, People's Publishing House, New Delhi, 1981.
- "How Feudal was Indian Feudalism?", Feudalism and Non-European Societies, ed., T. J. Byres, Harbans Mukhia, Routledge, London, 1985.
- "The Kali-Age: A Period of Social Crisis", Indian History and Thought (Essays in Honour of Arthur Llewellyn Basham), ed., S.N. Mukherjee, Calcutta, 1992, pp 186–203.
- "Material Progress, Taxation and State Formation in the Age of the Buddha", History and Culture (Dr. B.P. Sinha Felicitation Volume), ed., Bhagwant Sahai, Ramanand Vidya Bhawan, Delhi, 1987.
- "Rare Example of Dedication, A Tribute paid to Professor Radha Krishna Choudhary", Journal of Bihar Puravid Parishad (Chaudhary Commemoration Issue), VI and VIII, ed., Bhagwant Sahai, The Bihar Puravid Parishad, Patna, 1989.
- "A Tribute to Liugo Pio Tessitori", Liugo Pio Tessitori, ed., Carlo Dello Casa et al., Bresacisa, Paideia editrice, 1990.
- "Keynote Address" at the National Seminar, Department of Archaeology, University of Calcutta, in Historical Archaeology of India (A dialogue between Archaeologists and Historians), ed., Amita Ray and Samir Mukherjee, Books and Books, New Delhi, 1990, pp. 1–11.
- "A Tribute to Professor J.N.Sarkar", Studies in Cultural Development of India (Collection of Essays in Honour of Professor Jagdish Narayan Sarkar), ed., N.R. Ray and P.N. Chakrabarti, Punithi Pustak, Calcutta, 1991, pp. 12–13.
- "Urbanism in Early Historic India", The City in Indian History, ed. Indu Banga, Manohar Publications, New Delhi, 1991, pp. 9–18.
- "Freedom Struggle in Barauni in 1930", Alok Purush: Dr. A.K.Sen Smriti Grantha, ed., D.N. Sharma et al., Lekshakti Prakashan, Patna, 1989, pp. 73–81.
- "A.K.Sen: A Tribute", Alok Purush: Dr. A.K.Sen Smriti Grantha, ed., D.N. Sharma et al., Lekshakti Prakashan, Patna, 1989, pp. 73–81.
- "Basawon Sinha; A revolutionary patriot" Commemorative Volume, "He Humbled Pride", ed., Rita Sinha and R. Manikaran, Delhi (1999).

=== Papers and articles ===
- "Economic position of the Sudras in the Dharmasutras", Patna University Journal, vol. I, 1950.
- "Social position of the Sudras in the Dharmasutras", Current Studies, I, no. 1.
- "Prachina Bharatiya Sahitya mein Stri aur Shudra ke Sammilita Ullekha", JBRS, XXXVI (iii–iv), 1950, pp. 183–91.
- "Manu aur Yajnavalkaya mein Sudron ki Rajnitika aur Kanuni avastha", Sahitya, Journal of the Bihar Hindi Sahitya Sammelan, no.1, 1950.
- "Manu aur Yajnavalkaya mein Sudron ki Samajik avastha", Sahitya, Journal of the Bihar Hindi Sahitya Sammelan, no.2, 1950.
- "Manu aur Yajnavalkaya mein Sudron ki Arthik avastha", Sahitya, Journal of the Bihar Hindi Sahitya Sammelan, no.3, 1950.
- "Role of Property, Family and Caste in the Origin of the State in Ancient India", PIHC, 14th session, Jaipur, 1951, pp. 45–52, Also in JBRS, XXXVIII (i), 1952, pp. 117–133.
- "The Vidhatha", PIHC, 15th Session, Gwalior, 1952, pp. 85–91. Also published as "Vidhatha: The Earliest Folk Assembly of the Indi-Aryans", JBRS, XXXVIII (iii–iv), 1952, pp. 429–48.
- "Politico-Legal Aspects of the Caste System (600 BC – 500 AD)", JBRS, xxxix (III), 1953, PP. 306–330.
- "Superstition and politics in the Arthashastra of Kautilya", JBRS, XL (iii), 1954, pp. 223–231.
- "The Vedic Gana and the origin of the Post-Vedic Republics", JBRS, XXXIX(iv), 1953, pp. 413–426.
- "Caste and Marriage in Ancient India" JBRS, XXI(i), 1954, pp. 39–54.
- "Ideological background of research works on Ancient Indian Polity", Patna University Journal, VII, 1954.
- "Traces of promiscuity in Ancient Indian Society", PIHC, 19th Session, Agra, 1956, pp. 153–157.
- "Some Economic aspects of the Caste system in Ancient India", correspondence with Dr. D.C. Sirkar, Current Studies, no.3.
- "Irrigation in Northern India during the post-Maurya period c. 200 BC – C. AD 200", PIHC, 20th Session, Anand, 1957.
- "Notes on land revenue system in pre-Maurya period (600–300 BC)", Proceedings of the All India Oriental Conference, 1957, also in the Bulletin of the G.D. College, Begusarai.
- "Kusana Polity", PIHC, 21st session, Trivendrum, 1958. Also in JBRS, XLII (iii–iv), 1957, p. 188f.
- "The Origins of Feudalism in India (AD 400–650)", JESHO, 1, 1958, pp. 279–328.
- "A survey of land system in India from c. 200 BC to AD 650", JBRS, XLIV(iv), 1958, pp 225–34.
- "Gaps in non-political history of northern India (500–1200)", JBRS, XLV(iv), 1959, pp. 261–264, Hindi translation entitled "Uttara Bharat ke Rajnitikettar itihas mein antaral" by Rajendra Ram in Parishad Patrika, Varsha 7, Anka 4 (1968), pp. 30–36.
- "La Vie Et L' Organisation economiques Dans L' inde Ancienne", Cahiers D'histoire Mondial (Journal of World History), UNESCO, VI, 1960, pp. 234–64, English version published as "Stages in Ancient Indian Economy", Enquiry, no. 4, 1960, pp. 12–45.
- "Land System in Medieval Orissa, c 750–1200", PIHC, 23rd Session, Aligarh, part I, 1960, pp. 89–96.
- "Land grants to Vassals and Officials in North India (c. AD 1000–1200)", JESHO, IV, 1961, pp. 70–105. Also in Proceedings of the XXV International Congress of Orientalists, Moscow, 1963.
- "Historical Research in Patna University", Quarterly Review of Historical Studies, 1961–62, pp. 71–72.
- "Disarming of the Peasants under the Mauryas", Enquiry, no.6, 1962, pp. 129–33.
- "Heritage of Early Bihar", 67th Indian National Congress, Souvenir Volume, Patna, 1962, pp 128–30.
- "Gupt kalin Bihar ki Shashan vyavastha", 67th Indian National Congress, Souvenir Volume, Patna, 1962.
- "Feudal Economy under the Palas and Pratiharas", Vishwabharati Quarterly, XXVIII, no.2, 1963, pp. 68–83.
- "Post Independence Work on Early Indian History", Proceedings of the Indo-Pakistan Cultural Conference, Delhi, 1963.
- "Problems of Research in History in Indian Universities", Quarterly Review of Historical Studies, 1, no.2, 1963.
- "Rate of Interest in the Dharmasastras", PIHC, 25th session, Patna, 1963, pp. 78–85. Also in N.K.Bhattasali Commemoration Volume, ed., A.B.M. Habibullah, Dhaka, 1966, pp. 12–13.
- "The Organisation of Historical Research in Indian Universities", Quarterly Review of Historical Studies, III, 1963–64, pp. 127–29.
- "Kinds of Interest in the Dharmasastras", PIHC, 26th session, Ranchi, 1964, part I, pp. 121–29.
- "26th International Congress of Orientalists: A Retrospect", Afro-Asian and World Affairs, no.2, Summer 1964.
- "Land Rights in Early Medieval India (500–1200)", Proceedings of XXVI International Congress of Orientalists, New Delhi, 1964.
- "Central Asia and Early Medieval Indian Polity", Quarterly Review of Historical Studies, IV, 1964–65, PP56–77.
- "Usury in Early Medieval India(AD 400–1200)", Comparative Studies in Society and History, VIII, 1965–66, pp. 56–57.
- "Satavahana Polity", PIHC, 28th session, Mysore, 1966, pp. 81–93.
- "Coordination of research in History in Indian Universities", Quarterly Review of Historical Studies, V 1965–66, pp25–27.
- "Material Background of the Vedic Warfare" (Review of Ancient Indian Warfare with special reference to the Vedic Period by Sarva Daman Singh), JESHO, IX, 1966, pp. 302–7.
- "Some General Suggestions, Undergraduate Teaching in History", Proceedings of Seminar on Undergraduate Teaching of History, Patna University, 1968, pp. 6–11.
- "Coins and Problems of Early Indian Economic History", PIHC, 30th session, Bhagalpur, 1968, pp. 103–108. Also in The Journal of Numismatic Society of India, XXXI, 1969, pp. 1–8.
- "Obituary (Devraj Chanana)", Enquiry, Spring, 1969, pp. 129–30.
- "Decay of Gangetic Towns in Gupta and post-Gupta Times", PIHC, 33rd Session, Muzaffarpur, 1972, pp. 94–105.
- "Material Milieu of the Birth of Buddhism," paper presented at the XXIX International Congress of Orientalists, Paris, July 1973 (unpublished).
- "Forms of Property in the Early Portions of the Rg Veda", PIHC, 34th Session, Chandigarh, 1973, Vol. I, pp. 94–103. Also in Essays in Honour of S.C. Sarkar, People's Publishing House, New Delhi, 1976, pp. 39–50.
- "The Economic History of India up to AD 1200: Trends and Prospects" (jointly with D.N. Jha), JESHO, XVII, pt.1, 1974, pp. 48–80.
- "Indian Feudalism Retouched", IHR, vol.1, no.1, September 1974, pp. 320–330.
- "Iron and Urbanisation in the Ganga Basin", IHR, Vol.1, No.1, March 1974, pp. 98–103.
- "Method and Problems of the study of Feudalism in Early Medieval India (Notes and Documents)", IHR, Vol.1, No.1, March 1974, pp. 81–84.
- "Problems of Transition from Ancient to Medieval in Indian History", IHR, Vol.1, No.1, March 1974, pp. 1–9.
- "Class Formation and its Material Basis in the Upper Gangetic Plain (c. 1000–500 BC)", IHR, Vol.II, No.1, July 1975, pp. 1–13.
- "Problems of Social Formation in Early India", General President's Address, PIHC, 36th session, Aligarh, 1975, pp. 1–14.
- "Later Vedic Phase and the Painted Grey Ware", Puratatva, No.8, 1975–76, pp. 63–67. Also published in Debiprasad Chattopadhyaya, ed., History and Society: Essays in Honour of Professor Niharranjan Ray, Calcutta, 1978, pp. 133–141.
- "Rajsasana: Meaning, Scope and Application", PIHC, 37th Session, Calicut, 1976, pp. 76–87.
- "The Socio-Economic Bases of 'Oriental Despotism' in Early India", paper presented at the 30th International Congress of the Human Sciences in Asia and North Africa, Mexico, 1976. Later published in S.K. Bose, ed., Essays in Honour of Dr. Gyanchand (1981).
- "Conflict, Distribution and Differentiation in Rigvedic Society", PIHC, 38th Session, Bhubaneshwar, 1977, pp. 177–91. Also in IHR, Vol.IV, No.1, July 1977, PP.1–12.
- "From Gopati to Bhupati (a review of the changing position of the king)", Studies in History, (Old Series), Vol.II, No.2, July–December 1980, pp. 1–10.
- "Taxation and State Formation in Northern India in Pre-Mauryan Times", Social Science Probings, Vol.1, No.1, March 1984, pp. 1–32.
- "From Kin to Class" (Review of From Lineage to State by Romila Thapar), Economic and Political Weekly, Vol.XX, No.22, 1 June 1985, 960–61.
- "How Feudal was Indian Feudalism?", The Journal of Peasant Studies, XII, nos.2&3, January/April 1985, pp. 19–43.
- "Stages in State Formation in Ancient India", Social Science Probings, Vol.II, No.1, March 1985, pp. 1–19.
- "Introduction" in Survey of Research in Economic and Social History of India, ed., R.S. Sharma, Ajanta Book International, Delhi, 1986, pp.xi-xviii.
- "L.P.Tessitori – A Centenary Tribute", IHR, Vol. XIII, Nos.1–2, July 1986 and January 1987, pp. 323–30.
- "Problems of Peasant Protest in Early Medieval India", Social Scientist, No.184, Vol.16, No.9, September 1988, pp. 3–16.
- "Inaugural Address", PIHC, Golden Jubilee Session, Gorakhpur, 1989, pp. i–iv.
- "The Segmentary State and the Indian Experience", IHR, Vol. XVI, Nos.1–2, July 1989 and January 1990, pp. 90–108.
- "General President's Address", Proceedings of Andhra Pradesh History Congress, 14th Session, Wrangal, 1990, pp. 1–8.
- "Urbanism and the Use of Metal Money in Early India", 12th Conference of International Association of Historians of Asia, University of Hong Kong, June 1991.
- "Obituary (K.K.Sinha)", PIHC, 52nd Session, Delhi, 1991–92, pp. 120–23.
- "Brauni ke Itihas ki Jhalak", Bhaktiyog Pustakalaya Swarnajayanti Smarika, ed. M.N. Dutt, Barauni, 1993.
- "Applied Sciences and Technology" and "South Asia from AD 300 to 700: The Northern Sub-Continent in History of Humanity", Vol.III, From the Seventh Century BC to the Seventh Century AD, ed. J. Herrmann and E. Zurcher, UNESCO, Paris, 1996.
- "The Ayodhya Issue", Destruction and Conservation of Cultural Property, ed. Robert Layton, Peter J. Stone and Julian Thomas, Routledge, London, 2001, pp. 127–38.
- "Rig Vedic and Harappan Cultures: Lexical and Archaeological Aspects", Social Scientist, Vol. 30, Nos.7–8, July–August 2002, pp. 3–12.
- "From Jana to Janapadanivesa", India and Indology: Past, Present and Future, ed., Deepak Bhattacharya et al., National Book Agency Pvt. Ltd., Kolkata, 2003, pp. 563–567.
- "Rural Relics of Communal Share and Social Inequality", Social Science Probings, Vol.15, Nos.3–4, Winter, 2003, pp. 1–9.
- "Some Western Views on the State and Economy in Early India", Vikramshila Journal of Social Sciences, Vol.1, No.1, Bhagalpur, pp. 27–34.
- "Migration and Archaeological Cultures", Indian Archaeology Since Independence, ed. K. M. Shrimali, ASHA, Delhi, 1996, pp. 47–52.
- "Mode of Production in Ancient India", in D.N. Gupta (ed.), Changing Modes of Production (Delhi: Hindu College, 1995)
- "Exploiting History through Archaeology", The Statesman Festival, 1995
- "Issues in the Identity of the Harappan Culture", in Joachim Heidrich, Hiltrud Rustau, and Diethelm Weidemann (eds), Indian Culture: Continuity and Discontinuity Walter Ruben Commemoration Volume, Berlin, 2002, pp. 33–38.
- "Identity of the Indus Culture", East and West, Vol.49, nos. 1–4, (December 1999), pp. 35–45.
- "Problems of Continuity and Interaction in Indus and Post-Indus Cultures", Social Scientist, Vol.28, Nos.1–2, Jan.-Feb. 2000, pp. 3–11.
- "The Kali Age: A Period of Social Crisis", "Material Milieu of Tantricism" and "The Feudal Mind", in D.N. Jha, ed., The Feudal Order, Manohar, New Delhi, 2000, pp. 61–77, 441–454 and 455–468 respectively.

=== Reviews ===
- History and culture of the Indian people, Vol IV, The Age of Imperial Unity, ed., R. C. Majumdar, JBRS, XXXVII, 1951, pp. 261–63.
- Arya Kaun Hain by Ram Charitra Singh, JBRS, XXXVIII (iv), pp. 497–99.
- Sources of Hindu Dharma by A.S. Altekar, JBRS, XXXIX, 1953, pp. 221–22.
- Yuga Purana by D.R. Mankad, JBRS, XXXIX, 1953, pp. 219–20.
- Sacrifice in the Rig Veda, by K.P. Potdar, JBRS, XL, 1954, pp. 83–85.
- History and Culture of the Indian People, Vol.III, The Classical Age, ed., R.C. Majumdar, JBRS, XL, 1954, pp. 195–98.
- "Transactions of the Archaeological Society of South India", JBRS, XL, II.
- Studies in the Origins of Buddhism by G.C. Pande, JBRS, XLII, 1956.
- The cult of Brahma by T.P. Bhattacharya, JBRS, XLII, 1957.
- Valmiki Ramayana, Balakanda, 10 Sargas, Baroda edn., JBRS, XL, II.
- A Comprehensive History of India, II, ed., K. A. Nilakanta Sastri, Calcutta, 1957, JBRS, XLV, 1959, pp. 235–40.
- Socio-Economic History of Northern India (c 1030–1194 AD) by B.P. Majumdar, Calcutta, 1960, JBRS, XV, 1959, p. 520.
- Early Chauhana Dynasties by Dasharatha Sharma, Delhi, 1961, JBRS, XLVI, 1960, pp. 370–72.
- The Economic Life of Northern India in Gupta Period by S.K. Maity, JESHO, II, 1959, pp. 342–47.
- L'esclavage dans L'inde Ancienne d'apres Les Texts Palis et Sanskrits by Dev Raj Chanana, JESHO, II, 1959, pp. 347–49.
- An Introduction to the Study of Indian History by D.D. Kosambi, Popular Prakashan, Bombay, 1956, Enquiry, no.1, pp. 121–124.
- Aśoka and the Decline of the Mauryas by Romila Thapar, Oxford, 1961, JBRS, XLVI, 1961, pp. 372–73.

== See also ==
- NCERT controversy
- Marxist historiography
- List of Indian writers

== Notes ==
=== Also refer ===
- Delhi Historians Group's Publication Communalization of Education: The History Textbooks Controversy, A report in 2002, New Delhi: Jawaharlal Nehru University, India
