= Zamindar =

Indian hereditary aristocrat

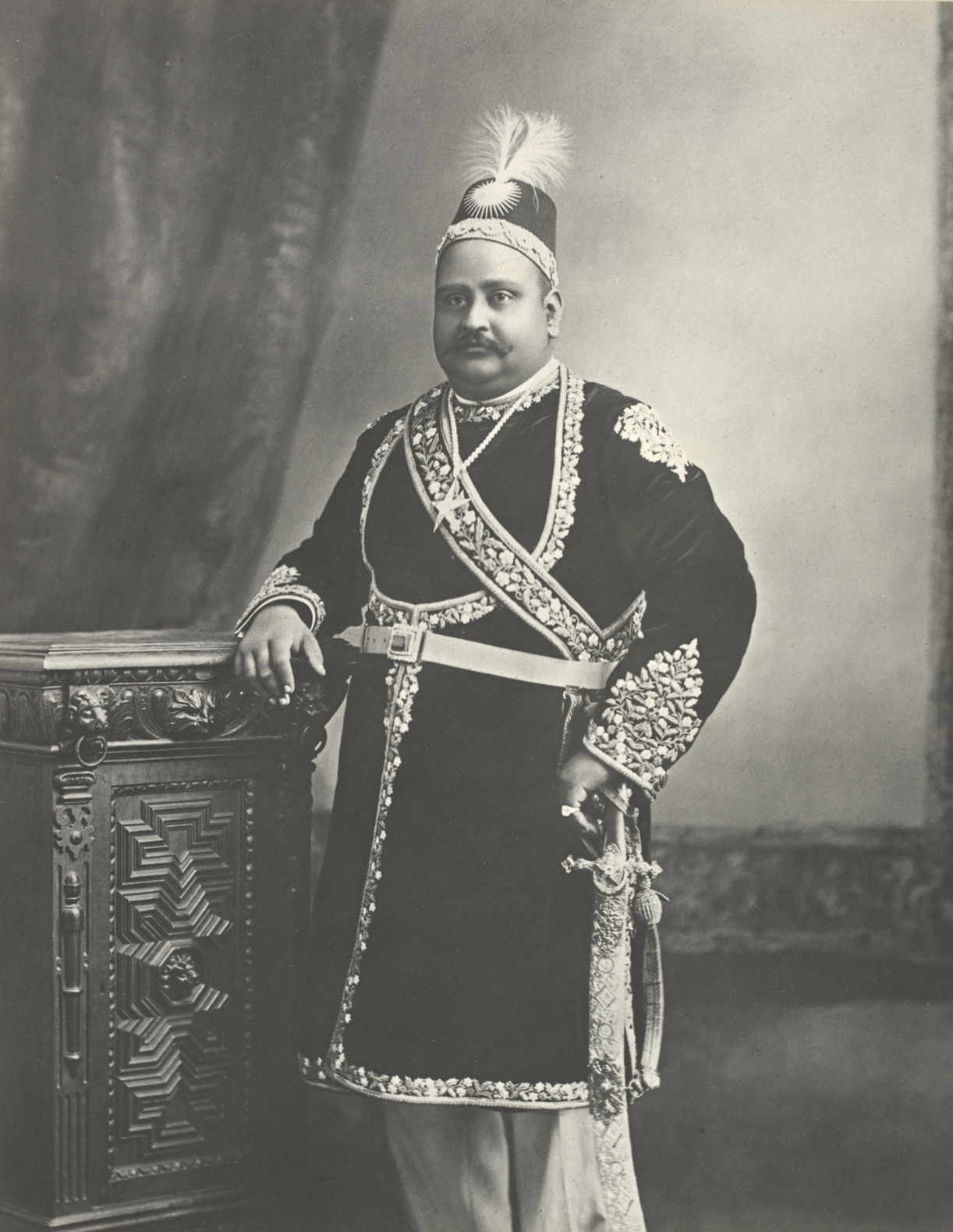
Khwaja Salimullah was a zamindar with the title of Nawab. His family's landholdings in Bengal were one of the largest in British India.

A zamindar (Note: Alternative spellings: zomindar, zomidar, jomidar and jamindar) in the Indian subcontinent was an autonomous or semi-autonomous feudal lord of a zamindari (feudal estate). The term itself came into use during the Mughal Empire, when Persian was the official language; zamindar is the Persian for landowner. During the British Raj, the British began using it as a local synonym for "estate". Subsequently, it was widely and loosely used for any substantial landed magnates in British India. Zamindars as a class were equivalent to lords and barons; in some cases, they were independent sovereign princes. Similarly, their holdings were typically hereditary and came with the right to collect taxes on behalf of imperial courts or for military purposes. This continued in states like Bihar, Haryana, Rajasthan, Uttar Pradesh, and West Bengal even after independence until the abolition of zamindari in 1950.

During the Mughal Empire, as well as the British rule, zamindars were the land-owning nobility of the Indian subcontinent and formed the ruling class. Emperor Akbar granted them mansabs, and their ancestral domains were treated as jagirs. Most of the big zamindars belonged to the Hindu high-caste, usually Brahmin, Rajput, Bhumihar, or Kayastha. During the colonial era, the Permanent Settlement consolidated what became known as the zamindari system. The British rewarded supportive zamindars by recognising them as princes. Many of the region's princely states were pre-colonial zamindar holdings elevated to a greater protocol. The British also reduced the land holdings of many pre-colonial princely states and chieftaincies, demoting their status to noble zamindars from previously higher ranks of royalty. During the period of British colonial rule in India, many wealthy and influential zamindars were bestowed with noble and royal titles such as Maharaja, Raja/Rai, Babu, Rai Sahib, Rai Bahadur, Nawab, and Khan.

The system was abolished during land reforms in East Pakistan (present-day Bangladesh) in 1950, India in 1951, and West Pakistan (present-day Pakistan) in 1959. The zamindars often played an important role in the regional histories of the subcontinent. One of the most notable examples is the 16th-century confederation formed by twelve zamindars in the Bhati region (Baro-Bhuyans), which, according to the Jesuits and Ralph Fitch, earned a reputation for successively repelling Mughal invasions through naval battles. The zamindars were also patrons of the arts. The Tagore family produced India's first Nobel laureate in literature in 1913, Rabindranath Tagore, who was often based at his estate. Similarly, many zamindars also promoted neoclassical and Indo-Saracenic architecture.

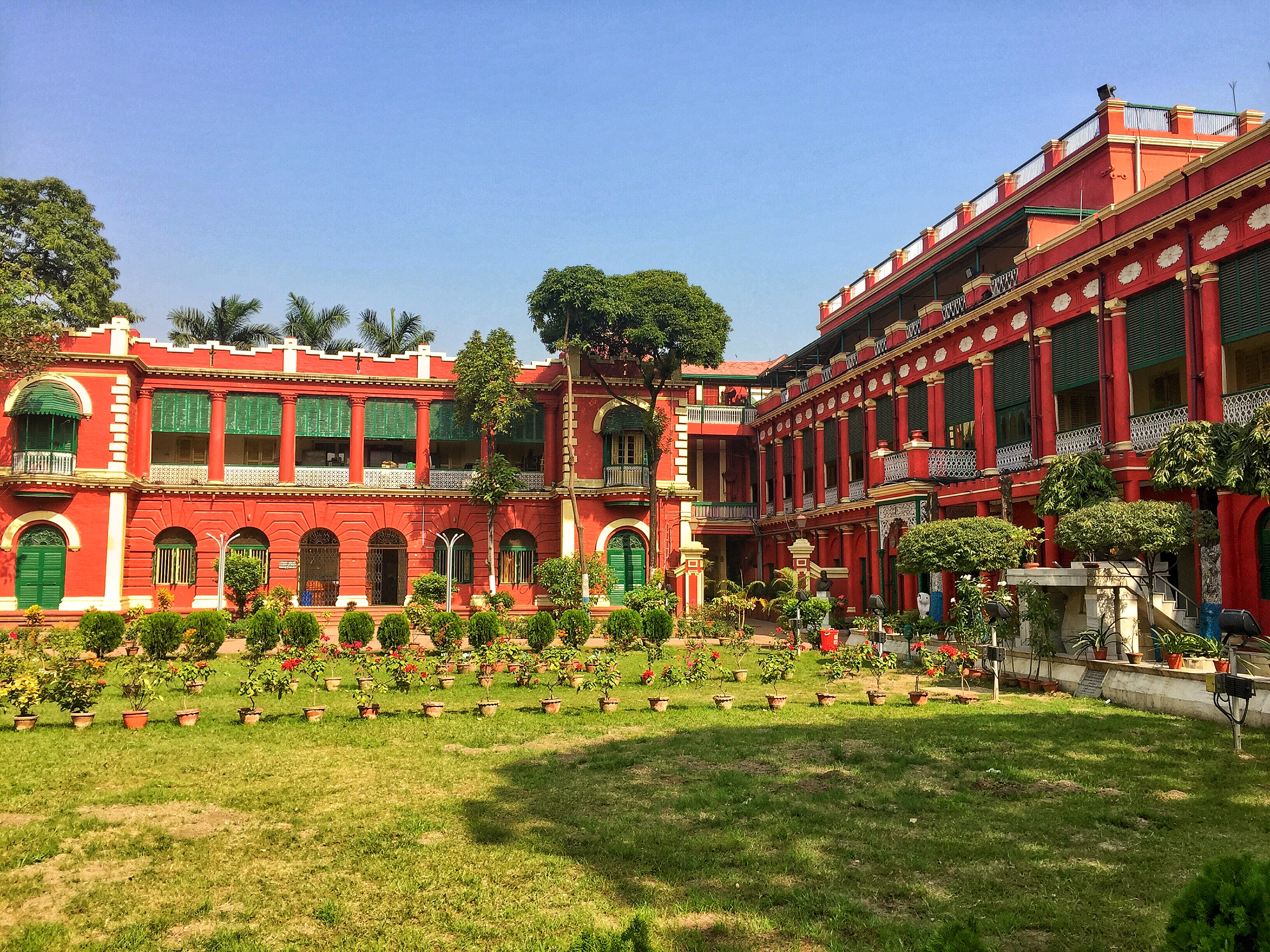
Jorasanko Thakur Bari, the seat of the Tagore family

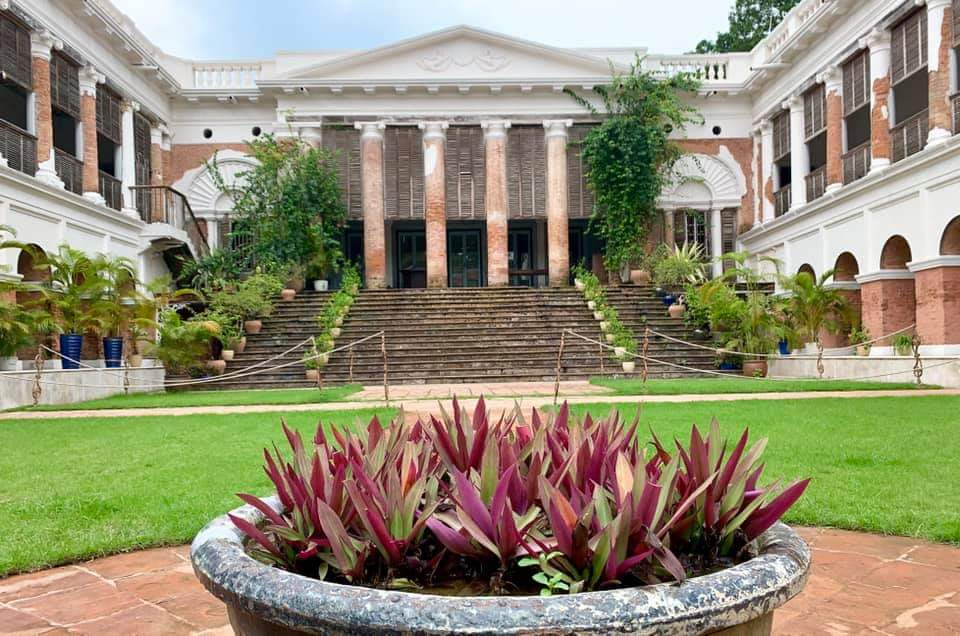
Façade of the 300-year-old Bawali Rajbari, with Corinthian pillars, the seat of the Bawali Raj family

== Mughal era ==
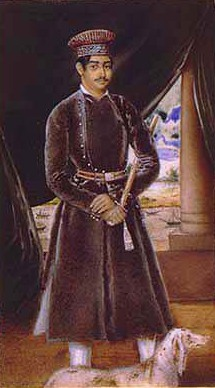
Mehtab Chand (1820–79) (zamindar of the Burdwan Raj) as a young man, c. 1840–45 AD.

When Babur conquered North India, there were many autonomous and semiautonomous rulers who were known locally as Rai, Raja, Rana, Rao, Rawat, etc., while in the various Persian chronicles, they were referred to as zamindars and marzabans. They were vassals who ruled, mostly hereditarily, over their respective territories. They commanded not only a considerable part of the economic resources of the empire but also military power. After the conquest of Hindustan, Babur informs us that one-sixth of its total revenues came from the territories of the chiefs. He writes, "The revenue of the countries now held by me (1528 A.D.) from Bhira to Bihar, is fifty-two crores as will be known in detail. Eight or nine crores of this are from the parganas of rais and the rajas who have submitted in the past (to the Sultans of Delhi), receive allowance and maintenance."

According to Arif Qandhari, one of the contemporary historians of Akbar's reign, there were around two to three hundred rajas or rais and zamindars who ruled their territory from strong forts under the emperor's suzerainty. Each of these rajas and zamindars commanded an army of their own, generally consisting of their clansmen, and the total numbers of their troops, as Abul Fazl tells us, stood at forty-four lakhs, comprising 384,558 cavalry, 4,277,057 infantry, 1,863 elephants, 4,260 guns, and 4,500 boats. During the Mughal Era, there was no clear difference between the princely states and zamindari estates. Even the ruling autonomous chiefs of princely states were called zamindars. Moreland was one of the first historians to draw our attention to the importance of zamindars in medieval India. He defines zamindars as "vassal chiefs". He points out that there were areas under direct control of the Mughals where there were no zamindars, and then there were territories of the vassal chiefs who had autonomy over their state, but were subjugated by the Mughals and paid a tribute/nazarana to the Mughal Emperor. However, Irfan Habib, in his book Agrarian System of Mughal India, divided the zamindars into two categories: the autonomous chiefs who enjoyed "sovereign power" in their territories and the ordinary zamindars who exercised superior rights in land and collected land revenue and were mostly appointed by the Mughals. These people were known as the zamindars (intermediaries), and they collected revenue primarily from the ryots (peasants). The zamindari system was more prevalent in the north of India because Mughal influence in the south was less apparent.

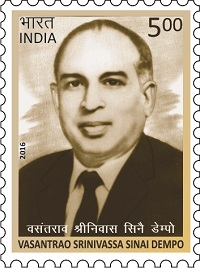
Vasantrao S. Dempo, Barao Dempo, zamindar and richest man of Goa and one of the wealthiest in India post-independence

Historian S. Nurul Hasan divided the zamindars into three categories: (i) The autonomous rai/rajas or chiefs, (ii) the intermediary zamindars, and (iii) the primary zamindars.

== British era ==
The East India Company established themselves in India by first becoming zamindars of three villages: Calcutta, Sultani, and Govindpur. Later, they acquired the 24-Parganas and, in 1765, got control of Bengal, Bihar, and Orissa. Later in 1857, the British Crown was established as the sovereign.

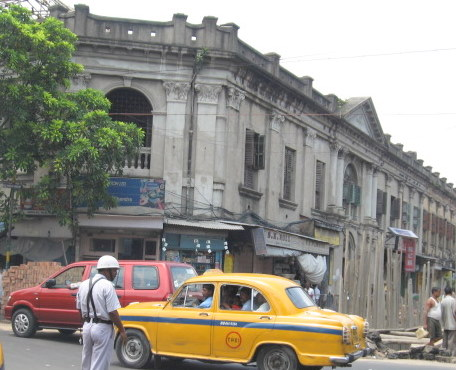
The Palace of the Janbazar Raj, the family of Rani Rashmoni

During the Mughal Era, the zamindars were not proprietors. The Mughal emperor was considered the supreme owner of the land. Zamindars only had the right to collect revenue (tax) from peasants, not to own the land itself. By the late 18th century, the British East India Company had already gained control over Bengal, Bihar, and Odisha after the Battle of Plassey (1757) and the Battle of Buxar (1764). The East India Company, under Lord Cornwallis, made the Permanent Settlement in 1793 with the zamindars and made them proprietors of their land in return for a fixed annual rent and left them independent for the internal affairs of their estates. This Permanent Settlement created the new zamindari system as we know it today. After 1857, the armies of the majority of zamindars were abolished with the exception of few forces for policing/digwari/kotwali in their respective estates. If the zamindars were not able to pay the rent until sunset, parts of their estates were acquired and auctioned. This created a new class of zamindars in the society. As the rest of India came later under the control of the East India Company (EIC), different ways were implemented in different provinces with regard to the ruling authorities in the region to get them to accede to Company authority.

The British generally adopted the extant zamindari system of revenue collection in the north of the country. They recognised the zamindars as landowners and proprietors as opposed to the Mughal government and, in return, required them to collect taxes. Although some zamindars were present in the south, they were not so in large numbers, and the British administrators used the ryotwari (cultivator) method of collection, which involved selecting certain farmers as being landowners and requiring them to remit their taxes directly.

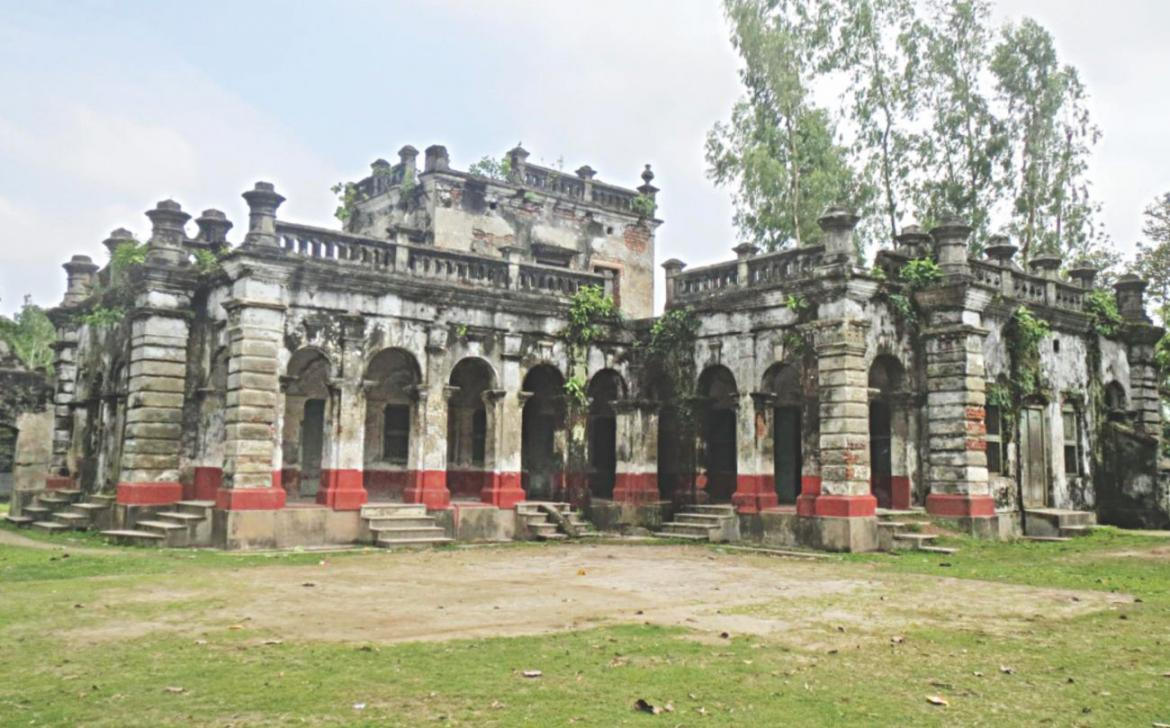
Former estate of the Zamindari Munshi family of Ulipur in Northern Bangladesh

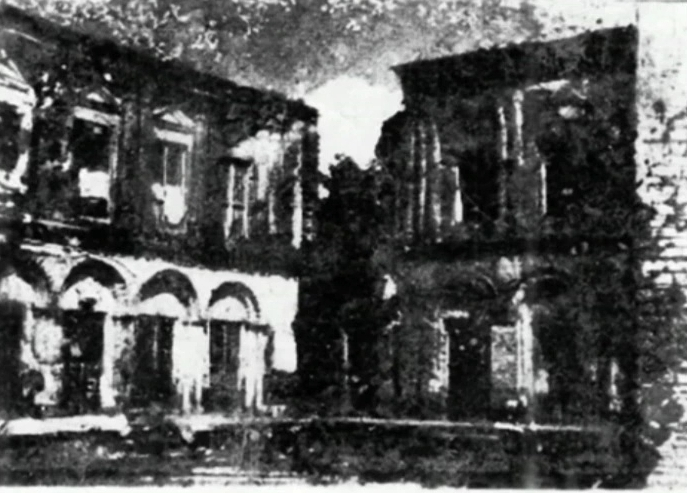
An old photograph of Kadirpara Munshi Bari

The zamindars of Bengal were influential in the development of Bengal. They played a pivotal role during the Indian Rebellion of 1857. Similarly, they were largely influential in philanthropy and the development of the arts.

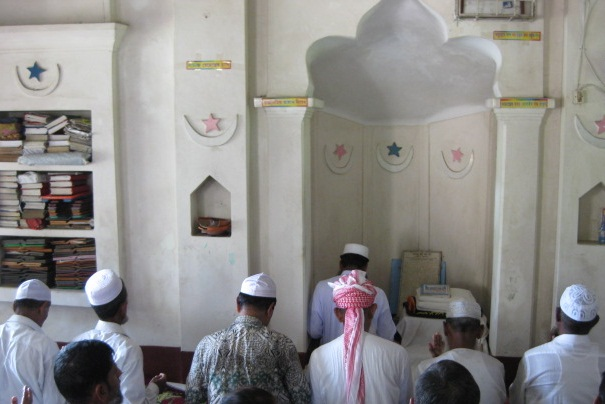
Mosque constructed by the Zamindari Munshi family of Comilla in Bengal

The British continued the tradition of bestowing both royal and noble titles on zamindars who were loyal to the paramount. The titles of Raja, Maharaja, Rai Saheb, Rai Bahadur, Rao, Nawab, Munshi, and Khan Bahadur were bestowed on princely state rulers and on many zamindars from time to time. According to an estimate in the Imperial Gazetteer of India, there were around 2000 ruling chiefs holding the royal title of Raja and Maharaja, which included the rulers of princely states and several large chiefdoms. This number increases tenfold if zamindar/jagirdar chiefs with other non-royal but noble titles are taken into account.

=== Accession ===
Unlike the autonomous or frontier chiefs, the hereditary status of the zamindar class was circumscribed by the Mughals, and the heir depended to a certain extent on the pleasure of the sovereign. Heirs were set by descent or, at times, even adoption by religious laws. Under the British Empire, the zamindars were to be subordinate to the Crown and not act as hereditary lords, but at times family politics was at the heart of naming an heir. At times, a cousin could be named an heir with closer family relatives present; a lawfully wedded wife could inherit the zamindari if the ruling zamindar named her an heir.

== Abolition ==
The zamindari system was mostly abolished in independent India soon after its creation with the First Amendment of the Constitution of India, which amended the right to property as shown in Articles 19 and 31. In East Pakistan, the East Bengal State Acquisition and Tenancy Act of 1950 had a similar effect of ending the system.

== In global health and tropical medicine ==
Critics have likened the discipline of global health and tropical medicine to having a feudal structure where individuals and institutions in high-income nations act as zamindars over health issues of low- and- iddle-income nations, thus sustaining the imperial nature of global health.

== See also ==
- Indian honorifics
- Ghatwals and Mulraiyats
- Mankari
- Thakur
- Zerat
