= The Myth of the Holy Cow =

2001 book by D. N. Jha

- Author: D. N. Jha
- Language: English
- Subject: Hinduism, History
- Published: 2001
- Publisher: Matrix Books, republished by Verso in 2002
- Publication place: India
- Pages: 183
- ISBN: 978-1-8598-4676-6

The Myth of the Holy Cow is a 2001 book by historian D. N. Jha published by Matrix Books. The book was republished by Verso in 2002. The book aims to dispel the myth of the holiness of cows in ancient India. The author received death threats by Hindu nationalists over it and the book was later banned by Hyderabad civil court.

== Overview ==
The book stated that cows were eaten in ancient India. Cattle, including cows, were neither inviolable nor as revered in ancient times as they were later.

== Reception ==
The book was reviewed by historian of religions, David M. Knipe of the University of Wisconsin, Madison and by Matthew Sayers of University of Texas, who noted it to be a "well-organized, well-focused, and concerted effort to demonstrate that the modern understanding that the cow has been sacred since Vedic times is a mistake."

== Attacks from Hindu nationalists ==
Since 2001, Jha has received death threats over his book The Myth of the Holy Cow in which he outlined the practice of eating beef in ancient India as documented in Vedic and Post-Vedic texts. Since Hindus consider the cow holy and deny the claims of beef consumption during Vedic period, the Hindu activist groups created controversy over his book. The book was banned by Hyderabad civil court.

== See also ==
- Cattle in religion and mythology
