= Zerat =

Indigo plant

Indigo manufacturing factory in Bengal

Zerat is a land ownership system in early colonial India. The zerat system was particularly common in Bengal and Bihar. It refers to the private land of the landlord, which would often be cultivated by peasants. Zerat was mainly responsible for a change in traditional forms of agricultural organization in some parts of India, replacing the ryot system. It produced a strain on the peasant economy, despite peasants being free to grow their own crops.

In indigo cultivation practiced by planters in Bihar and Bengal, the rayat and zerat were common practices which represented two labour hiring processes. The ryot (or raiyat) ("peasant") was a small land holder who took financial support from the planter and in return had to come to a written understanding to turn over the produce from his land to the planter at a predetermined amount.

Zerat cultivation, which is direct cultivation by the planter, however, was an exclusive practice of the planter in which he hired labour to work on his fields to grow crops of his choice. 'Zerat' literally means "the Zamindars private land, demesne", which had a direct impact on the peasants. The ploy of the planter in demesne was to encroach the land of the peasant and eventually claim it as his own and expand his control over the peasantry as a Zamindar.

In the Magistrate of Darbhanga's Administration Report for the year 1876–77, he reports that indigo cultivation in Bengal is divided into three methods that planters refer to as "tirhut". These are characterized as systems of tenure and conditions of indigo cultivation. The first of these, "zerat", is used if the land is in the planter's sole possession, and the ryot employed to work the land is a hired labourer. The term "assamiviar" is relevant when the land is in the rayat's possession and he is compelled (being the planter's tenant) to grow indigo on it at fixed rates. Lastly, the term "khooshgee" is appropriate when the rayat, under no compulsion, grows the plant as a remunerative crop. Sometimes referred to as "compulsory labour", expropriated peasants made up the largest group of the zerat labour force.

The ryot option was preferred by the planter, as his involvement was limited only to finance the cultivation and not pay for any other costs of labour and other inputs required to raise the crop or even loss of crop, particularly in indigo cultivation. The risk was entirely that of the peasant, who at times of loss of crop suffered losses and was even unable to cover the loan taken from the planter. The basic difference in the Zerat system was the planter had not only to pay for the labour costs but also bear all risks involved with raising the crop, and as such he did not prefer this option.

== See also ==
- Indian feudalism
