= Indian Feudalism (book) =

2005 book by Ram Sharan Sharma

- Third edition cover
- Author: Ram Sharan Sharma
- Language: English
- Subject: History of India, Ancient India
- Publisher: Macmillan Publishers India Ltd., 3rd Revised Edition, Delhi
- Publication date: 2005
- Publication place: India
- Preceded by: India's Ancient Past
- Followed by: Early Medieval Indian Society: A Study in Feudalisation, Perspectives in Social and Economic History of Early India

Indian Feudalism is a book by Indian professor Ram Sharan Sharma. The book analyses the practice of land grants, which became considerable in the Gupta period and widespread in the post-Gupta period. It shows how this led to the emergence of a class of landlords, endowed with fiscal and administrative rights superimposed upon a class of peasantry which was deprived of communal agrarian rights.

Professor Sharma studies in detail the basic relationships in early medieval society down to the eve of the Ghorian conquests. He argues in favour of a "feudalism largely realising the surplus from peasants mainly in kind through superior rights in their land and through forced labour, which is not found on any considerable scale... after the Turkish conquest of India."

The third revised edition of the book was published by Macmillan Publishers in 2005.

== See also ==
- Indian feudalism
