= Satish Chandra (historian) =

Indian historian (1922–2017)

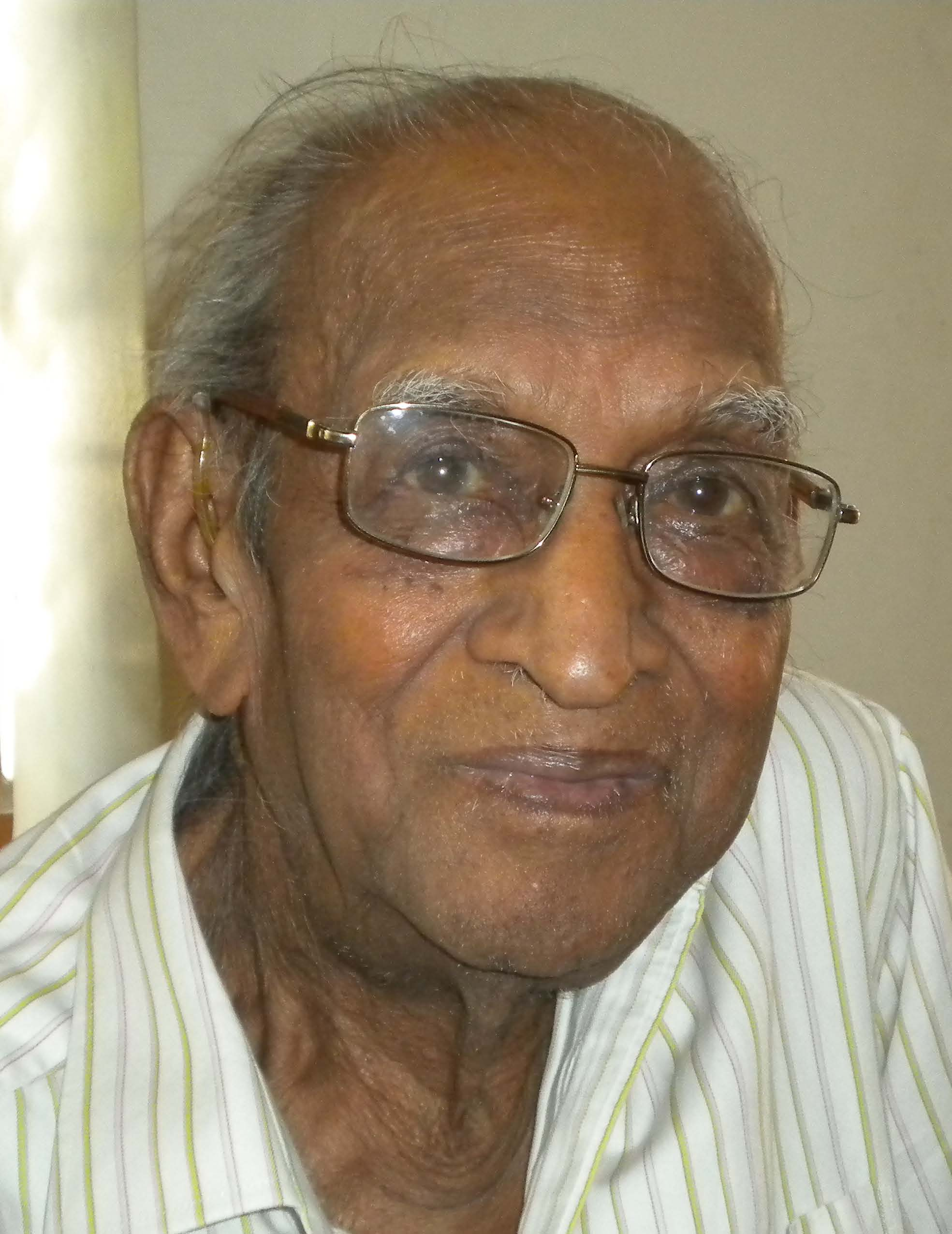
- Chandra in 2016
- Born: 20 November 1922; Meerut, Uttar Pradesh
- Died: 13 October 2017 (aged 94)
- Education: Allahabad University
- Occupation: Historian
- Known for: Authoring books about medieval Indian history

Satish Chandra (20 November 1922 – 13 October 2017) was an Indian historian whose main area of specialisation was medieval Indian history. He is often considered as a left-leaning historian, influenced by Marxian approach.

== Personal life ==
Satish Chandra was born in Meerut, Uttar Pradesh (then the United Provinces) to Sir Sita Ram, who later become the first Indian High Commissioner to Pakistan, and his wife, Basudevi.

He attended Allahabad University where he earned his B.A. (1942), M.A. (1944), and D.Phil. (1948) under the supervision of R.P. Tripathi. His doctoral thesis was on the Parties and Politics in 18th century India.

He was married to Savitri and had three sons.

== Career ==
He taught at Allahabad University, Aligarh Muslim University, Delhi University, and Rajasthan University and was the Smuts' Visiting Professor at Cambridge in 1971. He was Professor of History at Jawaharlal Nehru University (JNU) in New Delhi. Along with S. Gopal, Bipan Chandra, and Romila Thapar, he co-founded the Centre for Historical Studies at the School of Social Sciences in JNU. He was chairperson of the centre for a few years. He was the Secretary and President of the Indian History Congress.

Through the 1970s, he served as the vice chairman and chairman of the University Grants Commission of India. Among his various other appointments, he served in the council of the United Nations University, Tokyo between 1980 and 1986. He was an associated director of research at the Maison des Sciences de l'Homme as well as an executive board member at the International Congress of Historical Sciences, both in Paris. In 1988, he was asked by Union Public Service Commission to head a committee to review the system of appointments to the higher civil services.

== Research and ideology ==
Chandra has been described as one of India's leading scholars of the Mughal period and one of India's most influential historians. His book, Medieval India, has been widely used as a textbook in schools and colleges around India.

He belonged to the group of historians, along with Romila Thapar, R. S. Sharma, Irfan Habib, Bipan Chandra and Arjun Dev, who are sometimes referred to as "left-leaning", influenced by Marxian approach In 2004, his textbook was reintroduced in the national curriculum after a hiatus of six years.

== Selected books ==
Books authored

- The 18th Century in India: Its Economy and the Role of the Marathas, the Jats, the Sikhs, and the Afghans. Calcutta: Centre for Studies in Social Sciences. 1986. OCLC 17970100.
- Essays in Medieval Indian Economic History. New Delhi: Munshiram Manoharlal Publishers. 1987. ISBN 978-8121500852.
- Mughal Religious Policies, the Rajputs & the Deccan. New Delhi: Vikas Pub. House. 1993. ISBN 978-0-7069-6385-4.
- Historiography, religion, and state in medieval India. New Delhi: Har-Anand Publications. 1996. ISBN 978-8124100356.
- Medieval India: From Sultanat to the Mughals. Vol. 2 volumes. New Delhi: Har-Anand Publications. 1997. ISBN 978-8124105221.
- Parties and Politics at the Mughal Court, 1707-1740. Oxford University Press. 2002. ISBN 978-0-19-565444-8.
- Essays on Medieval Indian History. New Delhi: Oxford University Press. 2003. ISBN 978-0-19-566336-5.
- History of Medieval India. New Delhi: Orient Blackswan. 2007. ISBN 978-93-5287-457-6.
- State, Pluralism, and the Indian Historical Tradition. Oxford University Press. 2008. ISBN 978-0-19-569621-9.
- State, Society, and Culture in Indian History. Oxford University Press. 2012. ISBN 978-0-19-807739-8.

Books edited

- The Indian Ocean: Explorations in History, Commerce and Politics. Sage Publications. 1987. ISBN 978-81-7036-059-9.
- With Arunalacham, B.; Suryanarayan, V., eds. (1993). The Indian Ocean and its Islands: Strategic, Scientific, and Historical Perspectives. Sage Publications. ISBN 978-0-8039-9455-3.
- India's Islamic Traditions, 711-1750 by Richard Maxwell Eaton, Oxford University Press 2003, ISBN 9780195683349
