= D. N. Jha =

Indian historian (1940–2021)

Dwijendra Narayan Jha
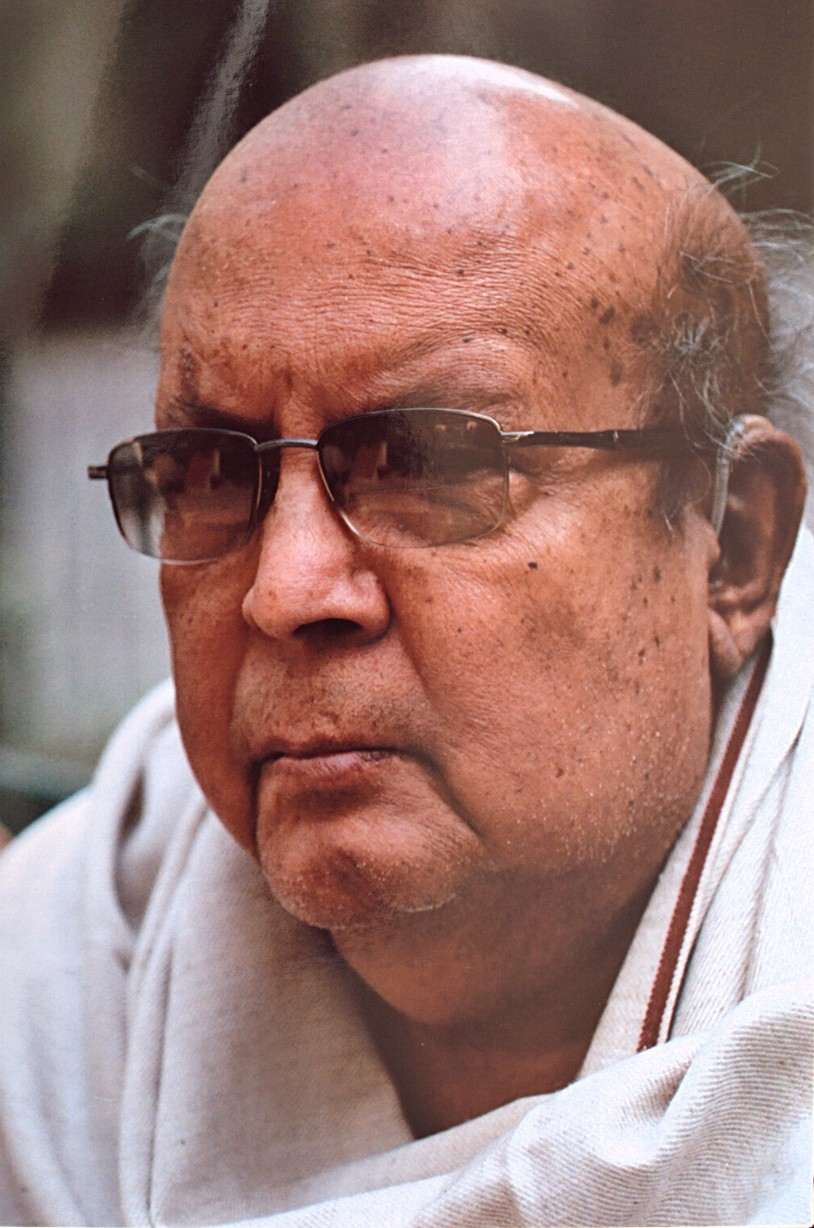
- Jha in November 2012
- Born: 1 July 1940; Ganauli, Darbhanga district, British India
- Died: 4 February 2021 (aged 80); Delhi, India
- Education: Presidency College, Calcutta; Patna University
- Occupation: Historian
- Notable work: The Myth of the Holy Cow (2001)

Dwijendra Narayan Jha (1 July 1940 – 4 February 2021) was an Indian Marxist historian who studied and wrote on ancient and medieval India. He was a professor of history at Delhi University and a member of the Indian Council of Historical Research. His books include Ancient India: In Historical Outline (1997), The Myth of the Holy Cow (2001), and Early India: A Concise History (2004). Through his works he argued against the communal distortions of history and challenged popular beliefs about the sanctity of the cow and tradition of eating beef in India.

== Education ==
Jha completed his Senior Secondary Schooling at the Board of Secondary Certification, West Bengal with a First Division. He then completed his Intermediate Examination of Arts with First Division followed by Bachelor of Arts (honours) in History at University of Calcutta and then his MA in History at Patna University where he was a student of Professor R.S. Sharma, who was among the first modern Indian historians to study history through socio-economic analysis.

== Career ==
Jha was a professor at the history department of the Delhi University specializing in ancient and medieval history. In a career of over three decades, he spoke against communal distortions of history. Through his works, he studied the socio-economic structures of early India and used India's ancient texts to draw linkages between culture and technology and the resulting social and state setup. In some of his early works he studied revenue systems and linkages between economy and society in ancient India. His study was a breakaway from both imperialist historians who studied India without problematising colonialism and nationalist historians who studied Indian history using folklore, wars, and royalties. In doing so, he was a among group of historians who believed that post independence India's nation building efforts hinged on a professional attempt at writing history. Jha repeatedly took positions against Hindu nationalist ideology, arguing against what he claimed to be communalism and saffronisation. He was critical of the view that "tolerance is the very essence of 'Hinduism qua Hinduism'", and had claimed what he termed as Brahmanical intolerance since early India. He was credited with identifying inconsistencies in Indian history and his efforts to bring a contemporary relevance to ancient history.

He was an author of multiple history text books for India's National Council of Educational Research and Training, the organization which developed the textbooks and course curricula for Indian schools. He also served as the secretary of the Indian History Congress and a member of the Indian Council of Historical Research He was a member of visiting faculty at the Institute of Oriental Culture in the University of Tokyo.

In 1991, he wrote a paper, with other historians R.S. Sharma, Suraj Bhan, and Athar Ali, making a case that there was no evidence to prove that the Babri Masjid, a mosque in Ayodhya, was built over a temple at the same site. The findings were documented in Ramjanmabhoomi-Baburi Masjid: A Historians’ Report to the Nation (1991) which he co-wrote. The mosque was demolished a year later by right wing activists. The paper diverged in its findings from the Archaeological Survey of India's findings and was later dismissed by the Supreme Court of India in 2019 as an opinion.

In his 2001 book, The Myth of the Holy Cow, he made a case that beef was part of the early Indian diet and used also for medicinal purposes. He quoted religious and non-religious texts from ancient periods to dispel the prevailing belief that cow was holy and its meat not a part of historical Indian consumption. The book quoted Charaka Samhita to say that it was used in soups for intermittent fevers, emaciation, and tuberculosis, while the fat was used in the treatment of rheumatism. He used text from the Vedas and Upanishads to argue that cattle were routinely offered in sacrifice to various ancient deities. He then argued that the sacred status afforded to cows was a much more recent development.

He also challenged the notion that the age of the Gupta Empire (320 CE to 550 CE) was the "golden age" of Indian history. He argued that the notion of a gilded age before the Mughal Empire was a creation of historians during the Indian freedom movement and provided an ideological support to participants of the movement, but, served no purpose after.

Jha was accused by BJP politician, Arun Shourie of distorting the history of the destruction of Nalanda University in 12th century AD. In an article in the Indian Express, Jha responded that Shourie was distorting what he had said, and that Shourie's allegations of plagiarism are baseless. Jha also criticized Shourie's book Eminent Historians, saying that it contains "slander" and "has nothing to do with history."

His last published book, Drink of Immortality (2020) studied alcohol distillation and consumption in ancient India. He argued that there were more than 50 varieties of alcohol that were available and consumed by men and women of ancient India. He further quoted religious texts including the epics like Ramayana and Mahabharata as well as the Vedas mentioning of alcohol consumption.

== Works ==
=== The Myth of the Holy Cow ===
In his book The Myth of the Holy Cow, he alleged that cow formed part of the diet in ancient India. Cattle, including cows, were neither inviolable nor as revered in ancient times as they were later. Quoting from the Vedas and the Upanishads, he alleged that cattle were offered in sacrifice to various deities and that hardly any prayer was complete without animal sacrifice. He pointed out that during Rama's exile, Sita asked her husband for meat. And Ram obliged by getting her deer meat.

Jha has received death threats over his book The Myth of the Holy Cow in which he outlined the practice of eating beef in ancient India as documented in Vedic and Post-Vedic texts. Since Hindus consider the cow holy and deny the claims of beef consumption during Vedic period, the Hindu activist groups created controversy over his book.

Jha discussed the events surrounding the publication in the introduction of the book The Myth of the Holy Cow.

"Shortly afterwards, I began to get threats from unidentified callers asking me not to go ahead with the publication. Undeterred by all this Matrix Books, a new enterprising publishing house based in Delhi, mustered enough courage to publish the book promptly in the first week of August 2001. But some right-wing politicians and groups of religious fanatics, without reading a single page, termed it ‘blasphemous’, demanded my arrest and succeeded in obtaining a court order restraining the circulation of the book, and a self-appointed custodian of ‘Hinduism’ even sentenced me to death. The book was therefore published abroad by Verso (London)."

== Personal life ==
Jha had two brothers and one sister. Jha died on 4 February 2021 in Delhi, at age 80 (often misreported as 81); he suffered a paralytic attack a few years earlier and had lost much of his hearing.

== Publications ==
As author:

- 1980, Studies in early Indian economic history, Anupama Publications, ASIN: B0006E16DA.
- 1993, Economy and Society in Early India: Issues and Paradigms, ISBN 81-215-0552-6.
- 1997, Society and Ideology in India, ISBN 81-215-0639-5.
- 1997, Ancient India: In Historical Outline, ISBN 81-7304-285-3.
- 2002, Holy cow: beef in Indian dietary traditions. Matrix Books. 2002. OCLC 988874461.; paperback (2004) ISBN 1-85984-424-3
- 2004, Early India: A Concise History, ISBN 81-7304-587-9
- 2009, Myth of the Holy Cow, ISBN 81-8905-916-5
- 2009, Rethinking Hindu Identity, Routledge, ISBN 978-1-84553-459-2
- 2016, Brahmanical Intolerance in Early India, ISSN 0970-0293
- 2018, Against The Grain: Notes on Identity, Intolerance and History, ISBN 978-9350981689
- 2020, Drink of Immortality: Essays on Distillation and Alcohol Use in Ancient India, ISBN 978-9390035212

As editor:

- 1988, Feudal Social Formation in Early India, ISBN 81-7001-024-1
- 1996, Society and Ideology in India: Essays in Honour of Professor R.S. Sharma (Munshiram Manoharlal, Delhi, 1996).
- 2000, The Feudal Order: State, Society, and Ideology in Early Medieval India, ISBN 81-7304-473-2; a collection of critical essays by 20 specialists on medieval Indian society, politics, ideology and religion.
