= Manuke =

Manuke may refer to:

- Manuke, Moga district, a village in Moga district of Punjab, India
- Manuke, Ludhiana district, a village in Ludhiana district of Punjab, India
