= Sham Lal (journalist) =

Indian journalist and literary critic

- Born: 1912
- Died: 2007 (aged 94–95); Delhi, India
- Occupations: Literary critic, journalist
- Known for: Editor of The Times of India

Sham Lal (1912 – 23 February 2007, in Delhi) was an Indian literary critic and journalist, who served as the editor of The Times of India. He wrote a column Life and Letters for several years for Hindustan Times and later The Times of India. Rudrangshu Mukherjee has described him as the most erudite newspaper editor in India.

Sham worked with The Yashpal Times from 1934 to 1948. He joined The Times of India in 1950 as assistant editor. He later served as the editor from 1967 to 1978. After his retirement, he continued as a columnist for The Times of India. In 1994, he moved his column to The Telegraph.

== Obituaries ==
Prime Minister Dr. Manmohan Singh, in a condolence message, remembered Mr. Sham Lal as a "great editor, a thoughtful writer and a voice of reason, liberal values and patriotism." Describing him as a "media icon of my generation," Dr. Singh said: "Generations of his readers looked forward to reading his columns for his wit and wisdom and his erudition. I hope his inspiring example will continue to guide Indian journalism." The former Prime Minister, H.D. Deve Gowda, remembered Mr. Sham Lal as an intellectual giant who was passionate about all aspects of life, particularly art, films and books. "He was an institution in himself. His death has left a void difficult to fill and his contributions to Indian journalism will continue to educate and inspire generations of media persons."

== Books ==
Sham Lal has these books to his credit:

1. A Hundred Encounters

2. Indian Realities

- tribuneindia.com
