= Mridula Mukherjee =

Indian historian (born 1950)

- Born: 1950 (age 75–76); New Delhi, India
- Education: Delhi University (B.A.); Jawaharlal Nehru University (M.A., Ph.D.)
- Spouse: Aditya Mukherjee

Mridula Mukherjee (née Mahajan) is an Indian historian known for her work on the role of peasants in the Indian independence movement. She is an ex-chairperson of the Centre for Historical Studies at the Jawaharlal Nehru University, Delhi, and former director of the Nehru Memorial Museum and Library.

== Early life and education ==
Mukherjee was born in 1950 in New Delhi, India. Her parents, Vidya Dhar Mahajan and Savitri Shori Mahajan, had been renowned teachers of history in Lahore, from where they emigrated to New Delhi following the Partition of India in 1947. Her sister, Sucheta Mahajan, is a professor of Indian history at JNU, and her brother is Ajay Mahajan. Mukherjee is married to the historian Aditya Mukherjee. They have a daughter, Madhavi.

Mukherjee graduated from Lady Shri Ram College in New Delhi. She joined Jawaharlal Nehru University (JNU) as a post-graduate student in 1971, from where she obtained a PhD degree. Her doctoral thesis advisor was Bipan Chandra.

== Career ==
In 1972, while working on her doctoral thesis, Mukherjee was hired by the Centre for Historical Studies, JNU, as a faculty member, from where she retired as a professor of history. She was a chairperson of the Centre as well. In 2005, she was appointed the director of the Nehru Memorial Museum and Library, New Delhi.

== Research ==
She investigated agrarian history in the Punjab. She argued that despite extensive irrigation works, colonialisation caused agricultural involution, with the number of workers per unit area rising and production dropping. She also analysed peasant movements in the erstwhile princely states of the Punjab across the pre- and post-1947 periods. Her critical analysis of a Marxian orientation of peasant consciousness has been highlighted.

A common thread running through Mukherjee's work has been a criticism of the Subaltern mode of historical inquiry, which informs her analysis of peasant movements as well as her other major contribution: modern Indian history. This is encapsulated by the two books co-written with Bipan Chandra et al: India's Struggle for Independence and India after independence: 1947-2000. In the former book, the authors sought to "demolish the influence of the Cambridge and Subaltern 'schools' reflected in the writing on colonialism and nationalism in India".

== Ideology ==
After Mukherjee was appointed the director of the Nehru Memorial Museum and Library (NMML) two letters, written between February 2008 and June 2009 and signed by various academics, including Ramchandra Guha and Sumit Sarkar were sent to the NMML's executive council complaining of alleged deterioration in scholarly standards of the centre.

Supporting Mukherjee, another set of academics, including Irfan Habib and Madhu Kishwar, wrote to the Prime Minister of India protesting her treatment. Mukherjee herself pointed out that under her tenure, the NMML had completed a ten-volume publication of the selected works of Jayaprakash Narayan, besides initiating a digitisation project.

The executive council disregarded the petition and extended Mukherjee's tenure for another two years.

Following the end of her appointment, a search for her replacement ended up in a court case with accusations of irregularities. The Delhi High Court struck down the appointment of Mukherjee's successor on the grounds that the process was faulty and against norms.

== Selected publications ==
=== Books ===
- Chandra, Bipan; Mukherjee, Mridula (14 October 2000). India's Struggle for Independence. Penguin. ISBN 978-81-8475-183-3.
- Mukherjee, Mridula (8 September 2004). Peasants in India's Non-Violent Revolution: Practice and Theory. SAGE Publications. ISBN 978-81-321-0289-2.
- Mukherjee, Mridula (23 November 2005). Colonizing Agriculture: The Myth of Punjab Exceptionalism. SAGE Publications. ISBN 978-0-7619-3404-2.
- Chandra, Bipan; Mukherjee, Aditya; Mukherjee, Mridula (2008). India Since Independence. Penguin. ISBN 978-0-14-310409-4.
- Mukherjee, Aditya; Mukherjee, Mridula; Mahajan, Sucheta (5 August 2008). RSS, School Texts and the Murder of Mahatma Gandhi: The Hindu Communal Project. SAGE Publications. ISBN 978-81-321-0047-8.

=== Articles ===
- Mukherjee, Mridula (1973). "Premchand and the Agrarian Classes". Proceedings of the Indian History Congress. Chandigarh.
- Mukherjee, Mridula (1979). "Peasant Movement in Patiala State, 1937-48". Studies in History. I (2): 215–283.
- Mukherjee, Mridula (28 June 1980). "Some Aspects of Agrarian Structure of Punjab, 1925-47". Economic and Political Weekly. XV (26): A46–A58.
- Mukherjee, Mridula (1985). "Commercialisation and Agrarian Change in Pre-Independence Punjab". In Raj, K.N. (ed.). Essays on the Commercialisation of Indian Agriculture. Oxford University Press.
- Mukherjee, Mridula (1995). "The Bardoli Peasants Struggle, 1928". In Dayal, Ravi (ed.). We Fought Together for Freedom. Oxford University Press.
- Mukherjee, Mridula (2002). "Indian Historiography: Ideological and Political Challenges". In Raghavan, Hema V. (ed.). Contending Ideologies: A Quest for New Moorings. Gargi.
