= Bipan Chandra =

Indian historian (1928–2014)

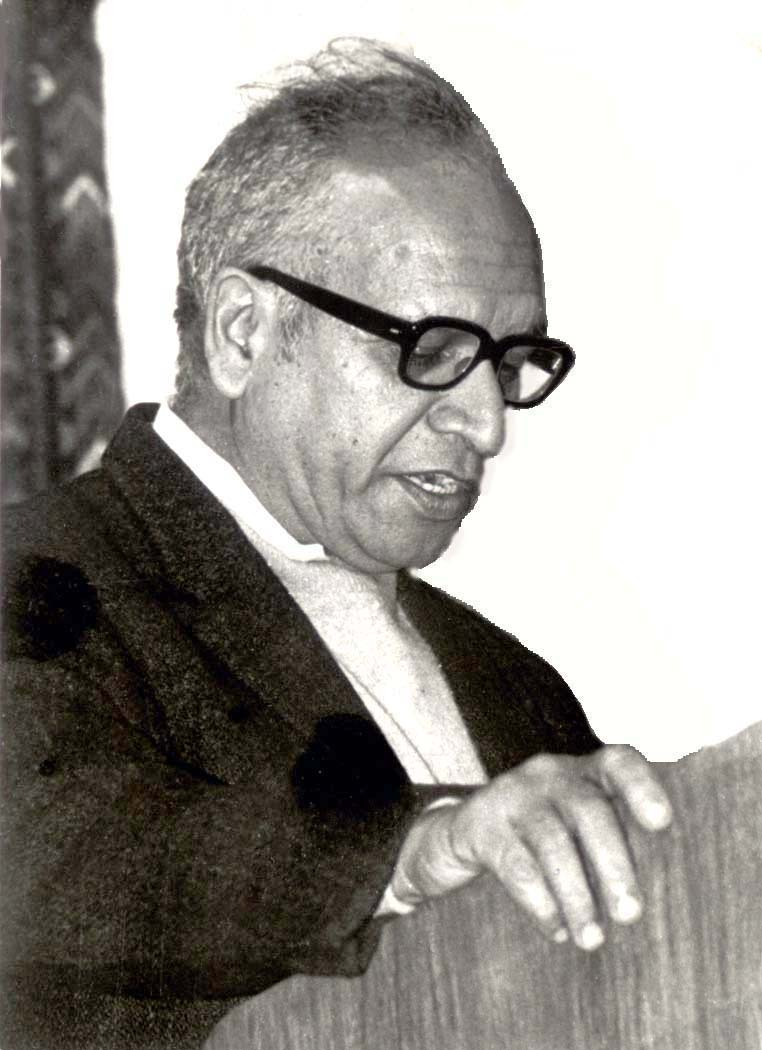
- Born: 24 May 1928; Kangra, Punjab, British India, now Kangra, Himachal Pradesh
- Died: 30 August 2014 (aged 86); Gurgaon, Haryana, India
- Citizenship: Indian
- Education: Forman Christian College, Lahore; Stanford University; Delhi University
- Works: India's Struggle for Independence
- Awards: Padma Bhushan (2010), Royal Asiatic Society of Bihar plaque

Bipan Chandra (24 May 1928 – 30 August 2014) was an Indian historian, specialising in economic and political history of modern India. An emeritus professor of modern history at Jawaharlal Nehru University, he specialized on the Indian independence movement is considered a leading scholar on Mahatma Gandhi. He is referred to as a "nationalist-Marxist" historian influenced by the Marxian approach. He authored several books, including The Rise and Growth of Economic Nationalism.

== Early life and education ==
Chandra was born in Kangra in Punjab, British India (now in Himachal Pradesh). He graduated from Forman Christian College, Lahore in 1946 after which the Partition forced him to leave. Thereafter, he went to the United States where he studied at the Stanford University, California. He established relationships with Communists in the United States; later, he was forced to leave the country as the anti-Communist crusade of Joseph McCarthy hit a fever pitch. Back in Delhi in the early 1950s, Bipan Chandra was appointed lecturer in history at Hindu College, Delhi. He would go on to complete his PhD from Delhi University in 1959.

== Career ==
Chandra taught for many years as lecturer and then as reader at Hindu College. He moved to Jawaharlal Nehru University when it was established in 1969, and established the Centre for Historical Studies, along with colleagues including Romila Thapar, Sarvepalli Gopal, and Satish Chandra.

He founded the journal Enquiry with his colleague Randhir Singh at Delhi University.

In 1985 Chandra was a sectional president and then the general president of the Indian History Congress at Amritsar. In 1993, he became a member of the University Grants Commission. From 2004 to 2012, he was the chairman of the National Book Trust, New Delhi. As Chairman of National Book Trust, India, he started many new series such as Popular Social Science, Autobiography, Afro-Asian Countries series, Indian Diaspora Studies etc.

In 2010, the Government of India conferred the Padma Bhushan on Chandra for his distinct contribution in the fields of literature and education.

== Research ==
Chandra was at the forefront of the communist movement in India since Independence. His historiography was influenced by Marxian approach. Chandra is referred to as a "nationalist-Marxist" historian. His co-authored book, Freedom Struggle, was censored by the new central government that came to power in India in 1977. He collaborated with many historians, including Nurul Hasan, Ram Sharan Sharma, Sarvapalli Gopal, Satish Chandra, Romila Thapar, Irfan Habib, Barun De and Arjun Dev and his students, such as Mridula Mukherjee, Aditya Mukherjee, Sucheta Mahajan and Vishalakshi Menon, some of whose textbooks have previously been prescribed in the history syllabi of schools in India.

== Death ==
After a prolonged illness, Chandra died on 30 August 2014 at the age of 86 at his home in Gurgaon. Jawaharlal Nehru University, Delhi organised a commemorative event on his birth anniversary.

== Publications ==
- The rise and growth of economic nationalism in India: economic policies of Indian national leadership, 1880-1905. People's Publishing House. 1966. ISBN 8170071410.
- Chandra, Bipan; Tripathi, Amales; De, Barun (1972). Freedom struggle. Delhi: National Book Trust. ISBN 9788123702490.
- Nationalism and Colonialism in Modern India. New Delhi: Orient Longman. 1979. ISBN 0861312821.
- The Indian left: critical appraisals. Vikas. 1983. ISBN 0706921038.
- Communalism in Modern India, (New Delhi, 1984)
- Indian National Movement: The Long Term Dynamics, (New Delhi, 1988)
- India's Struggle for Independence, 1857-1947, (New Delhi, 1989)
- The Epic Struggle, (New Delhi, 1992)
- Essays on Contemporary India, (New Delhi, 1993)
- Essays on Indian Nationalism, (New Delhi, 1993)
- Ideology and Politics in Modern India, (New Delhi, 1994)
- History of Modern India, Orient Blackswan, 1990
- Essays on Colonialism, (New Delhi, 1999)
- India Since Independence, (jointly with Mridula Mukherjee and Aditya Mukherjee), (New Delhi, 1999)
- The Making of Modern India: From Marx to Gandhi, Orient Blackswan, 2000
- In the Name of Democracy: The JP Movement and the Emergency, (New Delhi, 2003)
- Communalism: A Primer, (New Delhi, 2008)
- " History of modern india" ( orient blackswan, 2009
