= Manuke, Moga district =

Village located in Punjab, India

Manooke Manuke
- Village

Māṇūkē transcription(s)
- Location in Punjab, India Manooke (India)
- Coordinates: 30.62964358495033°N 75.19125907520178°E
- Country: India
- State: Punjab
- District: Moga

Area
  - Total: 24.5841 km^{2} (9.4920 sq mi)

Population (2011)
  - Total: 10,406

Languages
  - Official: Punjabi

Manuke, alternatively spelt as Manooke or Manuki, is a village situated in the Nihal Singhwala tehsil of the Moga district of the state of Punjab, India. It is located approximately 9 km away from the sub-district headquarter of Nihal Singhwala (tehsildar office), and 28 km south away from Moga, the eponymous city of the district. The total literacy rate of Manooke is 64.79%, out of which the individual literacy values by sex are 67.26% for males and 61.99% for females of the locality. There are about 1,987 houses located in the village. 3,358 persons of the village belong to Scheduled Castes. The village belongs to the Malwai culture and the Malwai dialect of Punjabi is spoken by the locals.

== History ==
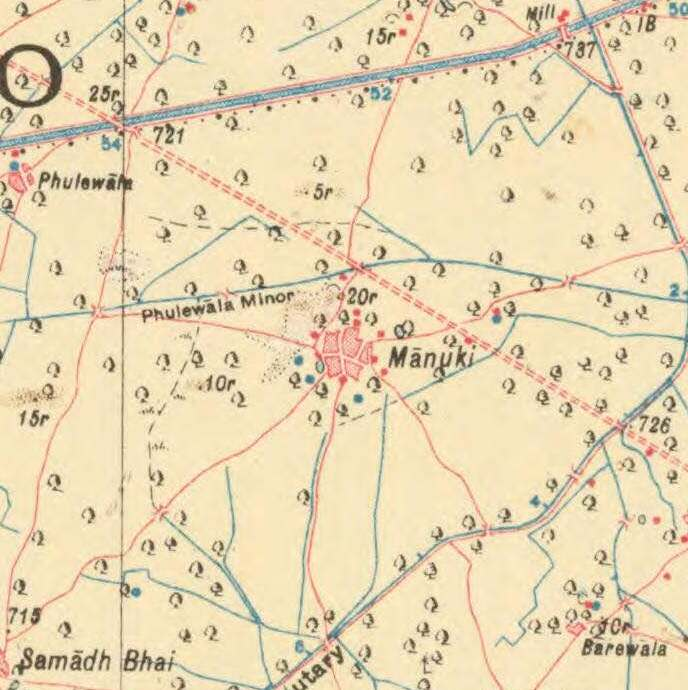
Manuke village in Moga tehsil, Survey of India geographical block-map for 44 N NW Ferozepore (1921)

The Kakar fair was held in Manuke village during the end of the traditional month of Har (June-July) as per A. H. Bingley's Sikhs (1899). During World War I, at-least ninety-five local men of Manuke served in the British Indian Army during the war, with at-least two dying during it.

== Land records ==
Shajjra Nasb (also known as Kursee Nama (Note: Kursee Nama is also spelt as 'Kurseenama' or 'Kursinama'.)) records of Manuke village from 1952–1953 have been digitized by the Church of Jesus Christ of Latter-day Saints via FamilySearch and are available for online viewing. These records detail land ownership pedigrees for families of the village.
