= Indian History Congress =

Indian historical body

Indian History Congress is the largest professional and academic body of Indian historians with over 35,000 members. It was established in 1935. The name of any new applicant for membership needs to be proposed and seconded by existing Ordinary or Life Members.

== History ==
The lead to establish an all-India national congress of historians was taken by Poona historians during the period of British colonial rule. The first session took place in Bharat Itihas Sanshodhak Mandal, Poona, in 1935. Historians such as Datto Vaman Potdar, Surendra Nath Sen (who later became the first director of the National Archives of India), and Sir Shafaat Ahmad Khan attended the first session.

Historians Mohammad Habib and Susobhan Sarkar and later Nurul Hasan, Ram Sharan Sharma, Radha Krishna Chaudhary, Satish Chandra, Bipan Chandra, Romila Thapar, Irfan Habib, Athar Ali, Barun De, Iqtidar Alam Khan, B. N. Mukherjee, K. N. Panikkar, Brajadulal Chattopadhayay, Dwijendra Narayan Jha, Sumit Sarkar, Sabyasachi Bhattacharya and Pritam Saini have had a long association with the Indian History Congress.

== Awards ==
H.K. Barpujari Award

- 1985: Sumit Sarkar
- 1987: M. Athar Ali
- 1989: R.S. Sharma
- 1991: S. Settar
- 1993: No Award
- 2017: Sabyasachi Bhattacharya

Vishwanath Kashinath Rajwade Award (for lifelong service and contribution to Indian history)

- 2002: R.S. Sharma
