= The Insider (Rao novel) =

Book by Narasimha Rao

- Author: P. V. Narasimha Rao
- Language: English
- Published: 1998
- Publication place: India
- Pages: 833

The Insider is a roman à clef by P. V. Narasimha Rao, former Prime Minister of India, that was first published in 1998. It was Rao's first novel and created a storm when excerpts from the original manuscript were published in the launch issue of the Outlook magazine in 1995.

== History ==
P. V. Narasimha Rao had a long association with the literary world beginning with his founding of the Telugu magazine Kakatiya, dating back to his years of political activism against the Nizam's rule in Hyderabad. A polyglot, writer and translator in six Indian languages, Rao is credited with translating Thomas Gray's Elegy and the Constitution of India into Telugu. Rao has also translated the Telugu Jnanapith awardee Viswanatha Satyanarayana's Veyipadagalu into Hindi, and Hari Narayan Apte's Marathi novel Pan Lakshat Kon gheto into Telugu. He also wrote a short story in English titled "The Blue Silk Saree".

When Rao began writing his novel, it was titled The Other Half. It told the story of Niranjan, a member of the Indian National Congress party who goes on to become the Chief Minister of Andhra Pradesh. It was as much a novel as also a series of essays on independent India's history. Rao sent the completed manuscript to Nikhil Chakravartty, editor of Mainstream weekly. Rao was a long-time contributor to the weekly, writing under the pseudonym "Insider". Rao also contacted Mallika Sarabhai, who ran Mapin publishing house, and the New York literary agent Lynn Franklin who asked him to complete the novel for publication. Rao initially planned to end his novel with the end of Niranjan's term as chief minister. Rao, who had by this time served as a Union minister under Indira and Rajiv Gandhi was looking to retire politically and had intended to complete The Other Half by 1991. However, he was called upon to become the Prime Minister of India. Rao then informed Franklin that he would keep the novel's publication in abeyance during his term in office.

When Outlook magazine was launched in 1995 it was given the manuscript of The Other Half by Nikhil Chakravartty as a major scoop for the inaugural issue. Outlook, however, focused on the book's amorous passages, which infuriated Franklin and Rao. After the Congress comprehensively lost the elections the next year, Rao's resigned as prime minister and finally found time to complete his novel.

Rao was paid a ₹ 1,00,000 advance by David Davidar of Penguin India for publication rights. The manuscript was edited to exclude much of the sexual content and Anand substituted Niranjan as the central character. It has been noted that the book draws on material from The Reshuffle, a satirical political skit by Rao that was published by Mainstream in 1984. The book was renamed The Insider, the new title suggested by Kalyani Shankar, political editor at The Hindustan Times. The Insider was released in 1998 by Prime Minister Atal Bihari Vajpayee at a function in Delhi that had two former prime ministers and a president in attendance.

== Synopsis ==
The novel is set in the fictional State of Afrozabad, which is modeled on the Indian city of Hyderabad, the capital of the state of the then Andhra Pradesh and present Telangana and follows the political career of its protagonist Anand a naive idealist who goes on to become the prime minister of the nation. Much of the story corresponds closely to Rao's own experiences and political career albeit fictionalised. Anand begins his political career by rebelling against Afrozabad's tyrannical ruler. As he rises within the political party of which he is a member, Anand is drawn into the tussle between Chief Minister Mahendranath, a character modeled on Neelam Sanjiva Reddy, and his political rival Chaudhury, who is based on Kasu Brahmananda Reddy. As Chaudhary and his partner Shekhar successfully replace Mahendranath with Chaudhury as Chief Minister, Anand is made a minister under Chaudhary.

While serving as minister, Anand has a steamy affair with another legislator, Aruna whose character is said to have been based on the three-time Congress MP Lakshmi Kantamma. Described as "the most convincing of the characters" and "Anand's only weakness besides his addiction to Congress politics", the two eventually break up. In the meanwhile power in Delhi shifts from Nehru to Indira Gandhi and Anand becomes her unwavering loyalist. Under her, Chaudhury resigns and Anand becomes the first high command "nominated Chief Minister" of Afrozabad. When he tries however to pilot a bill on land reforms through the legislature, the inability to do so being the original cause for Chaudhury's replacement, he encounters a strong landlord lobby and is moved out of the state by Indira Gandhi to undertake party work.

The novel then breezes through an epilogue that covers the political ascendancy of Indira Gandhi in the 1970s, the Emergency, the Janata interregnum, Indira's second coming and assassination, the rise and death of Sanjay Gandhi and the premiership of Rajiv Gandhi. As Anand opts to retire from politics, he is however called upon to become the Prime Minister and the novel ends.

== Reception ==
The Insider was Rao's first novel and had been in the making for 20 years before it was published in 1998 by Penguin India. The book largely received negative reviews from both reviewers and politicians. Reviewing Indian roman à clefs in 2010, Nilanjana Roy noted that "This 1998 novel by a former Indian PM is now justly forgotten [...] At 767 pages, [The Insider] suffered from the defects of a great deal of Indian political writing—the gossip wasn’t good enough to justify the prolixity". Similarly, Sunanda Ray of The Telegraph noted that "though grateful for the gift, I did not find the book gripping reading. Therefore, I have no idea whether Anand, the central figure, matches Narasimha Rao in every detail". A revised and expanded edition of the book that was published by Penguin in 2000 was reviewed by The Hindu as "a book making heavy demands on the doggedness of a reader for withstanding an 833-page infliction from a former Prime Minister". On political grounds members of the Congress Party including Najma Heptullah were critical of Rao's novel while many BJP supporters dismissed it as a piece of sleazy writing.

The novel was reviewed favourably by Vir Sanghvi and welcomed by Mulk Raj Anand as an attempt at recording contemporary history by the players themselves.

== Sequel ==
Plans for writing a sequel to The Insider were announced by Rao after the book hit the markets and was to have covered his term as prime minister. In 2003 it was announced that the sequel was at a crucial point of evolution and that it would be published soon. In his last years as he fought several cases on charges of corruption it was reported that periodic receipts of royalty from the book helped Rao pay his lawyers. The sequel was however never published although Ayodhya 6 December 1992, Rao's book on the demolition of the Babri Masjid came out posthumously.
