= P. V. R. K. Prasad =

Indian civil servant (1941–2017)

P. V. R. K. Prasad IAS
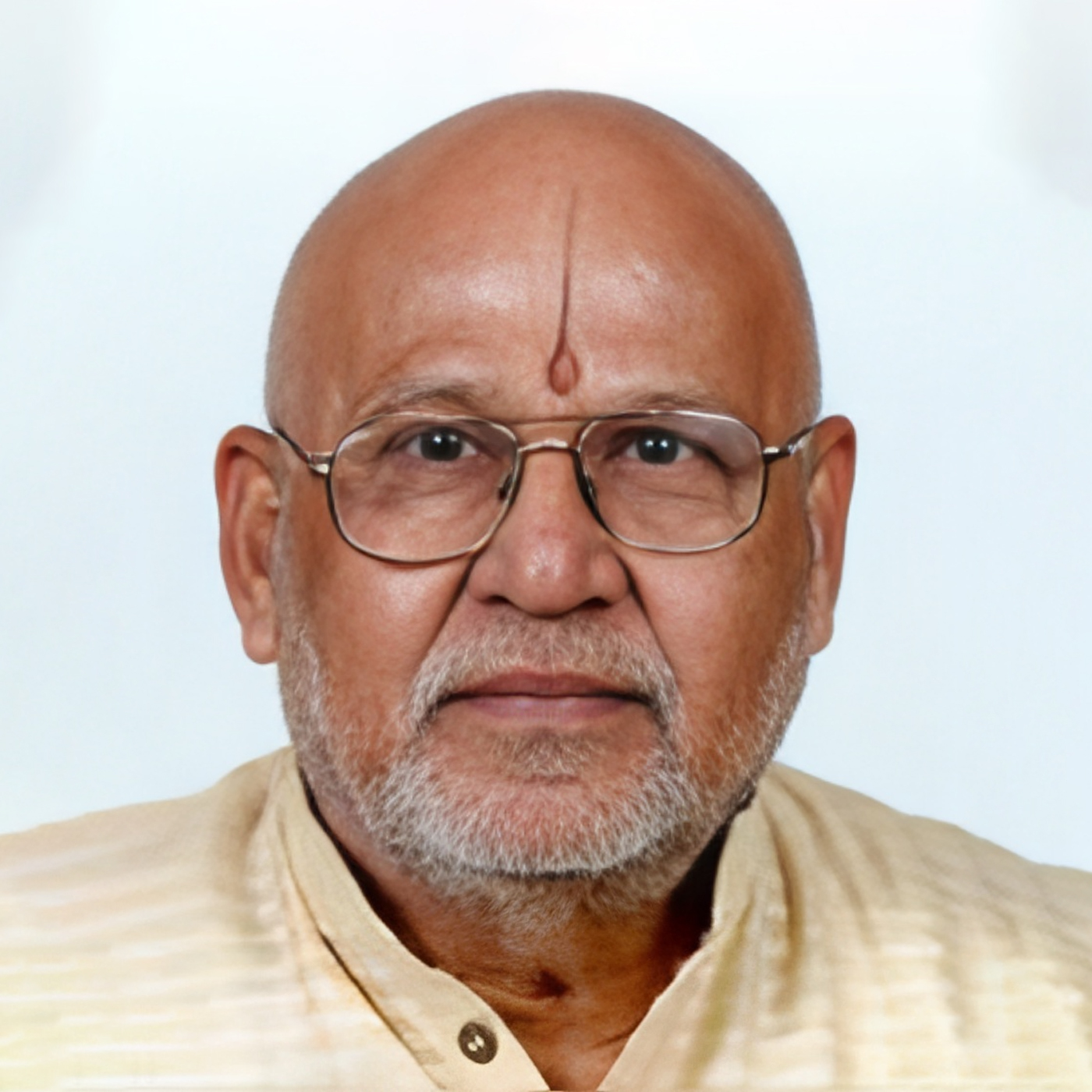

Media Advisor to the Prime Minister of India
- In office 1991–1996
- Prime Minister: P. V. Narasimha Rao

Personal details
- Born: Patri Venkata Rama Krishna Prasad; 22 August 1941 Siripuram, Guntur district
- Died: 21 August 2017 (aged 75) Hyderabad, Telangana
- Spouse: Gopika Prasad
- Children: Sanjeev, Madhavi
- Education: Master of Arts in English and LL.B. (Gold Medallist) from Nagpur University and Master's degree from Cambridge University
- Alma mater: Nagpur University; Cambridge University
- Occupation: IAS Officer
- Profession: Civil servant

P. V. R. K. Prasad (22 August 1941 – 21 August 2017), was an Indian civil servant who served as Media Advisor to the Prime Minister of India, P. V. Narasimha Rao from 1991 to 1996. Prasad is an Indian Administrative Service (IAS) officer belonging to 1966 batch of Andhra Pradesh cadre. He held several important posts in the center and state including media advisor to former Indian prime minister P. V. Narasimha Rao, executive officer (EO) of Tirumala Tirupati Devasthanams, and Director General of Dr. Marri Channa Reddy Human Resource Development Institute of Telangana. He brought a lot of reforms in the management of Tirumala temple to make it more people friendly. He continued to be an advisor of this temple even after retiring as an executive officer. He wrote several books about his experience working in with P. V. Narasimha Rao and working as an executive officer of Tirumala temple.

== Early life ==
Prasad was born on 22 August 1941 in Gudur in Nellore district into a Telugu-speaking Deshastha Madhva Brahmin family. His father Patri Krishna Rao was a head master of a school and his mother Subhadra Devi was a Housewife.

== Career ==
He belongs to 1966 I.A.S Batch. He worked as a collector of Khammam district and as a secretary to Chief minister. During his tenure as an executive officer with TTD from 1978 to 1982, and later as an advisor took up several reforms and important projects.

=== Posts Held ===
Prasad held several important positions throughout his career, among the most important of them were media advisor of former Indian prime minister P. V. Narasimha Rao, and executive officer of Tirumala Tirupati Devasthanams.

- Sub collector, Bhuvanagiri (1968-1969)
- Project Director, Small Farmers Development Board (1969-1971)
- Secretary to Chief Minister of Andhra Pradesh (1971-1972)
- Collector, Khammam (1974-1977)
- Executive Officer of Tirumala Tirupati Devasthanams (1978-1982)
- Commissioner, State Cultural Department (1984-1986)
- Commissioner, Excise Department (1986-1988)
- Chairman of Visakhapatnam Port Trust (1988-1992)
- Media Advisor and Additional Secretary of Prime Minister's Office (1992–96)
- Director General to Marri Chenna Reddy Human Resource Development Institute (1997-2004)
- Chairman of Hindu Dharma Parirakshana Trust

== Personal life ==
=== Family ===
Prasad is survived by his wife Gopika, a son, and a daughter. Though a Telugu native, he knew Kannada and Tamil. His son's name is Sanjeev and his daughter's name is Madhavi.

=== Views ===
P. V. R. K. Prasad is a follower Dvaita Vedanta of Hinduism, and a strong believer of spirituality. Prasad's family belongs to Uttaradi Math, hence he is an ardent devotee of his guru Satyapramoda Tirtha and Satyatma Tirtha of Uttaradi Math. Their family deity is Lord Venkateshwara of Tirupati. He is also a practitioner of rituals prescribed by Madhvacharya and meditation. Prasad has religiously visited major Hindu temples when he was an IAS officer and also during the latter part of his life; for instance, when he was serving as the EO of Tirumala Tirupati Devasthanams he experienced many miracles of Lord Venkateshwara. He wrote many books on Lord Venkateshwara and Tirumala. The most popular among them is "Naham Kartha Hari Kartha", a Telugu book in which he described the spiritual experience he had in Tirumala. This book was later translated to English, Tamil, Kannada and Hindi as "When I Saw Tirupati Balaji".

== Death ==
Prasad died on 21 August 2017 (his 76th birthday) of cardiac arrest in a private hospital in Hyderabad.

== Books ==
- Asalem Jarigindante (What actually happened): This book is about his experiences in various posts in the center and state administrative divisions. Later this book was translated to English with the title Wheels behind the veil (CMs, PMs, and beyond).
- Sarva Sambhavam-Naham Kartah Hari Kartah (I am not the doer, Hari is the doer): This book is about his spiritual experiences when he was working as an executive officer of T.T.D.

 When I Saw Tirupati Balaji: This book is the English translation of 'Sarva Sambhavam-Naham Kartah Hari Kartah'.

- Tirumala Leelamrutham
- Tirumala Charitamrutham

== Bibliography ==
- Prasad, P. V. R. K. (2008). When I Saw Tirupati Balaji. Gyan Publishing House. ISBN 978-8121209335.
