= P. V. Narasimha Rao =

Prime Minister of India from 1991 to 1996

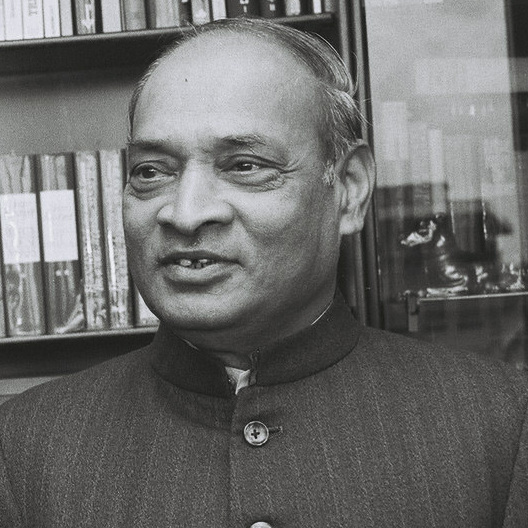
- Rao in 1983

Prime Minister of India
- In office 21 June 1991 – 16 May 1996
- President: Ramaswamy Venkataraman; Shankar Dayal Sharma
- Vice President: Shankar Dayal Sharma; K. R. Narayanan
- Preceded by: Chandra Shekhar
- Succeeded by: Atal Bihari Vajpayee
Additional ministries
In office 21 June 1991 – 16 May 1996
Ministry and Departments	Personnel, Public Grievances and Pensions; Department of Space; Department of Atomic Energy
Preceded by	Chandra Shekhar
Succeeded by	Atal Bihari Vajpayee

Union Minister of Defence
- In office 6 March 1993 – 16 May 1996
- Prime Minister: Himself
- Preceded by: Shankarrao Chavan
- Succeeded by: Pramod Mahajan
- In office 31 December 1984 – 25 September 1985
- Prime Minister: Rajiv Gandhi
- Preceded by: Rajiv Gandhi
- Succeeded by: Shankarrao Chavan

Union Minister of External Affairs
- In office 31 March 1992 – 18 January 1994
- Prime Minister: Himself
- Preceded by: Madhavsinh Solanki
- Succeeded by: Dinesh Singh
- In office 25 June 1988 – 2 December 1989
- Prime Minister: Rajiv Gandhi
- Preceded by: Rajiv Gandhi
- Succeeded by: V. P. Singh
- In office 14 January 1980 – 19 July 1984
- Prime Minister: Indira Gandhi
- Preceded by: Shyam Nandan Prasad Mishra
- Succeeded by: Indira Gandhi

Union Minister of Home Affairs
- In office 12 March 1986 – 12 May 1986
- Prime Minister: Rajiv Gandhi
- Preceded by: Shankarrao Chavan
- Succeeded by: Sardar Buta Singh
- In office 19 July 1984 – 31 December 1984
- Prime Minister: Indira Gandhi; Rajiv Gandhi
- Preceded by: Prakash Chandra Sethi
- Succeeded by: Shankarrao Chavan

Chief Minister of Andhra Pradesh
- In office 30 September 1971 – 10 January 1973
- Governor: Khandubhai Kasanji Desai
- Preceded by: Kasu Brahmananda Reddy
- Succeeded by: President's rule Jalagam Vengala Rao

Member of Parliament, Lok Sabha
- In office 15 May 1996 – 4 December 1997
- Preceded by: Gopinath Gajapati
- Succeeded by: Jayanti Patnaik
- Constituency: Brahmapur, Odisha
- In office 20 June 1991 – 10 May 1996
- Preceded by: Gangula Prathapa Reddy
- Succeeded by: Bhuma Nagi Reddy
- Constituency: Nandyal, Andhra Pradesh
- In office 31 December 1984 – 13 March 1991
- Preceded by: Barve Jatiram Chitaram
- Succeeded by: Tejsinghrao Bhosle
- Constituency: Ramtek, Maharashtra
- In office 23 March 1977 – 31 December 1984
- Preceded by: Constituency established
- Succeeded by: Chendupatla Janga Reddy
- Constituency: Hanamkonda, Andhra Pradesh

Member of Andhra Pradesh Legislative Assembly
- In office 1957–1977
- Preceded by: Gulukota Sriramulu
- Succeeded by: Chandrupatla Narayana Reddy
- Constituency: Manthani

Personal details
- Born: 28 June 1921 Laknepalli, Hyderabad State, British India
- Died: 23 December 2004 (aged 83) AIIMS New Delhi, Delhi, India
- Party: Indian National Congress
- Spouse: Satyamma (m. 1931; died 1970)
- Children: 8, including P. V. Ranga Rao, P. V. Rajeshwar Rao and Surabhi Vani Devi
- Education: Osmania University (BA); University of Mumbai; Nagpur University (LL.M.)
- Occupation: Lawyer; independence activist; statesman; writer
- Awards: Bharat Ratna

Pamulaparthi Venkata Narasimha Rao (28 June 1921 – 23 December 2004) was an Indian independence activist, lawyer, and politician from the Indian National Congress who served as the prime minister of India from 1991 to 1996. He was the first person from South India and the second person from a non-Hindi speaking background to be prime minister. He is known for his role in initiating India's economic liberalisation following an economic crisis in 1991, a process that has been sustained and expanded by every successive prime minister of the country.

Prior to his premiership, he served as the chief minister of Andhra Pradesh, and later also held high-order portfolios of the union government, such as Defence, Home Affairs and External Affairs. In 1991 Indian general election, the Indian National Congress led by him, won 244 seats, and thereafter, he, along with external support from other parties, formed a minority government with him being the prime minister. (Note: Gangula Prathap Reddy vacated his Nandayal seat)As prime minister, Rao adopted to avert the impending 1991 economic crisis, the reforms progressed furthest in the areas of opening up to foreign investment, reforming capital markets, deregulating domestic business, and reforming the trade regime. Trade reforms and changes in the regulation of foreign direct investment were introduced to open India to foreign trade while stabilising external loans.

In 2024, he was posthumously awarded the Bharat Ratna, India's highest civilian award, by the government of India. In 2025, his portrait was unveiled at Raj Bhavan on the eve of his birth anniversary by the Governor of Telangana Jishnu Dev Varma.

== Early life and background ==
P. V. Narasimha Rao was born on 28 June 1921 in a Telugu Niyogi Brahmin family in the village of Laknepalli village of Narsampet mandal, Warangal district of present-day Telangana (then part of Hyderabad State). His father Sitarama Rao and mother Rukma Bai hailed from agrarian families. Later, he was adopted by Pamulaparthi Ranga Rao and Rukminamma and brought to Vangara, a village in Bheemadevarpalle mandal of present-day Hanamkonda district in Telangana when he was three years old. Popularly known as P. V., he completed part of his primary education in Katkuru village of Bheemdevarapalli mandal in Hanamkonda district by staying in his relative Gabbeta Radhakishan Rao's house and studying for his bachelor's degree in the Arts college at the Osmania University. He was part of Vande Mataram movement in the late 1930s in the Hyderabad State. He later went on to Hislop College, now under Nagpur University, where he completed a master's degree in law. He completed his law from Fergusson College in Pune of the University of Bombay (now Mumbai).

Along with his distant cousin Pamulaparthi Sadasiva Rao, Ch. Raja Narendra and Devulapalli Damodar Rao, P. V. edited a Telugu weekly magazine called Kakatiya Patrika in the 1940s. Both P. V. and Sadasiva Rao contributed articles under the pen-name Jaya-Vijaya. He served as the Chairman of the Telugu Academy in Andhra Pradesh from 1968 to 1974.

He had wide interests in a variety of subjects (other than politics), such as literature and computer software (including computer programming). He was a polyglot and spoke 17 languages.

Rao died in 2004 of a heart attack in New Delhi. He was cremated in Hyderabad.

== Political career ==
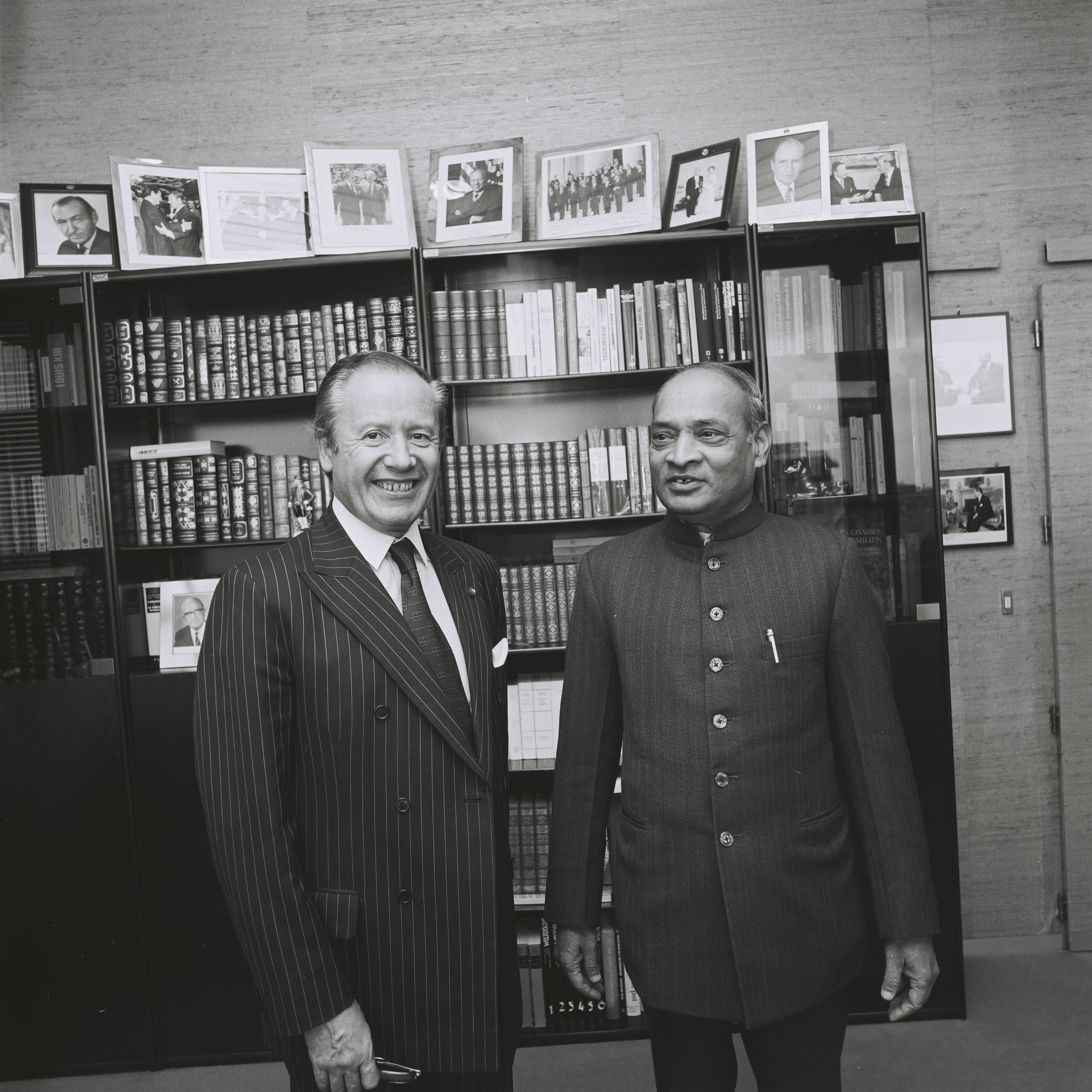
Visit of Narasimha Rao, Indian Minister for Foreign Affairs, to the CEC

Rao was an active freedom fighter during the Indian Independence movement and joined full-time politics after independence as a member of the Indian National Congress. He served as an elected representative for Andhra Pradesh State Assembly from 1957 to 1977. He served in various ministerial positions in Andhra government from 1962 to 1973. He became the Chief minister of Andhra Pradesh in 1971 and implemented land reforms and land ceiling acts strictly. He secured reservations for lower castes in politics during his tenure. President's rule had to be imposed to counter the Jai Andhra movement during his tenure.

He supported Indira Gandhi in the formation of the New Congress party in 1969 by splitting the Indian National Congress. This was later regrouped as Congress (I) party in 1978. He served as Member of Parliament, Lok Sabha from Andhra Pradesh. He rose to national prominence for handling several diverse portfolios, most significantly Home, Defence and Foreign Affairs, in the cabinets of both Indira Gandhi and Rajiv Gandhi. He served as Foreign minister from 1980 to 1984 and then from 1988 to 1989. In fact, it is speculated that he was in the running for the post of India's President along with Zail Singh in 1982.

Rao very nearly retired from politics in 1991. He was the Indian National Congress President from 29 May 1991– Sept.1996. It was the assassination of the Congress President Rajiv Gandhi that persuaded him to make a comeback. When Congress leaders asked slain leader's widow Sonia took to over, She recommended Rao As the Congress had won the largest number of seats in the 1991 elections, he had an opportunity to head the minority government as Prime Minister. He was the first person outside the Nehru–Gandhi family to serve as Prime Minister for five continuous years, the first to hail from the State of Telangana, then Part of United Andhra Pradesh and also the first from Southern India. Since Rao had not contested the general elections, he then participated in a by-election in Nandyal to join the parliament. Rao won from Nandyal with a victory margin of a record 5 lakh (500,000) votes, and his win was recorded in the Guinness Book Of World Records; later on, in 1996, he was MP from Berhampur, Ganjam District, Odisha. His cabinet included Sharad Pawar, himself a strong contender for the Prime Minister's post, as Defence Minister. He also broke a convention by appointing a non-political economist and future prime minister, Manmohan Singh as his Finance Minister. He also appointed Subramanian Swamy, an opposition party (Janata Party) member as the Chairman of the Commission on Labour Standards and International Trade. This has been the only instance that an opposition party member was given a Cabinet rank post by the ruling party. He also sent opposition leader Atal Bihari Vajpayee, to represent India in a UN meeting at Geneva.

Narasimha Rao won elections from different parts of India such as Andhra Pradesh, Maharashtra and Odisha.

=== Electoral performance ===
#	Position	Took office	Left office	Constituency	State
1	Member of Legislative Assembly	1957	1977	Manthani	Andhra Pradesh (Note: On 2 June 2014, Andhra Pradesh was split to form two separate states. Both Manthani Assembly constituency and Hanamkonda Lok Sabha constituency are now in the present-day state of Telangana.)
2	Member of Parliament, Lok Sabha	1977	1980	Hanamkonda	Andhra Pradesh
3	Member of Parliament, Lok Sabha	1980	1984	Hanamkonda	Andhra Pradesh
4	Member of Parliament, Lok Sabha	1984	1989	Ramtek	Maharashtra
5	Member of Parliament, Lok Sabha	1989	1991	Ramtek	Maharashtra
6	Member of Parliament, Lok Sabha	1991	1996	Nandyal	Andhra Pradesh
7	Member of Parliament, Lok Sabha	1996	1997	Berhmapur	Odisha

=== Parliament: Lok Sabha ===
Year	Constituency	Party	Votes	%	Opponent	Opponent Party	Opponent Votes	%	Result	Margin	%
1977	Hanamkonda	INC	231,593	59.32	P. Janardhan Reddy	BLD	153,910	39.43	Won	77,683	19.89
1980	Hanamkonda	INC(I)	257,961	65.90	P. Janardhan Reddy	INC(U)	95,012	24.27	Won	162,949	41.63
1984	Ramtek	INC	290,905	65.00	Gedam Shankarrao Daulatrao	IC(S)	104,933	23.44	Won	185,972	41.56
1989	Ramtek	INC	257,800	45.45	Hajare Pandurang Jairamji	JD	223,330	39.38	Won	34,470	6.07
1991 (By-election)	Nandyal	INC	626,241	89.48	Bangaru Laxman	BJP	45,944	6.56	Won	580,297	82.92
1996	Nandyal	INC	366,431	50.42	Bhuma Nagi Reddy	TDP	267,901	36.86	Won	98,530	13.56
1996	Berhampur	INC	340,555	62.57	V. Sugnana Kumari Deo	JD	172,015	31.61	Won	168,540	30.96

== Prime Minister of India (1991–1996) ==
=== Economic reforms ===
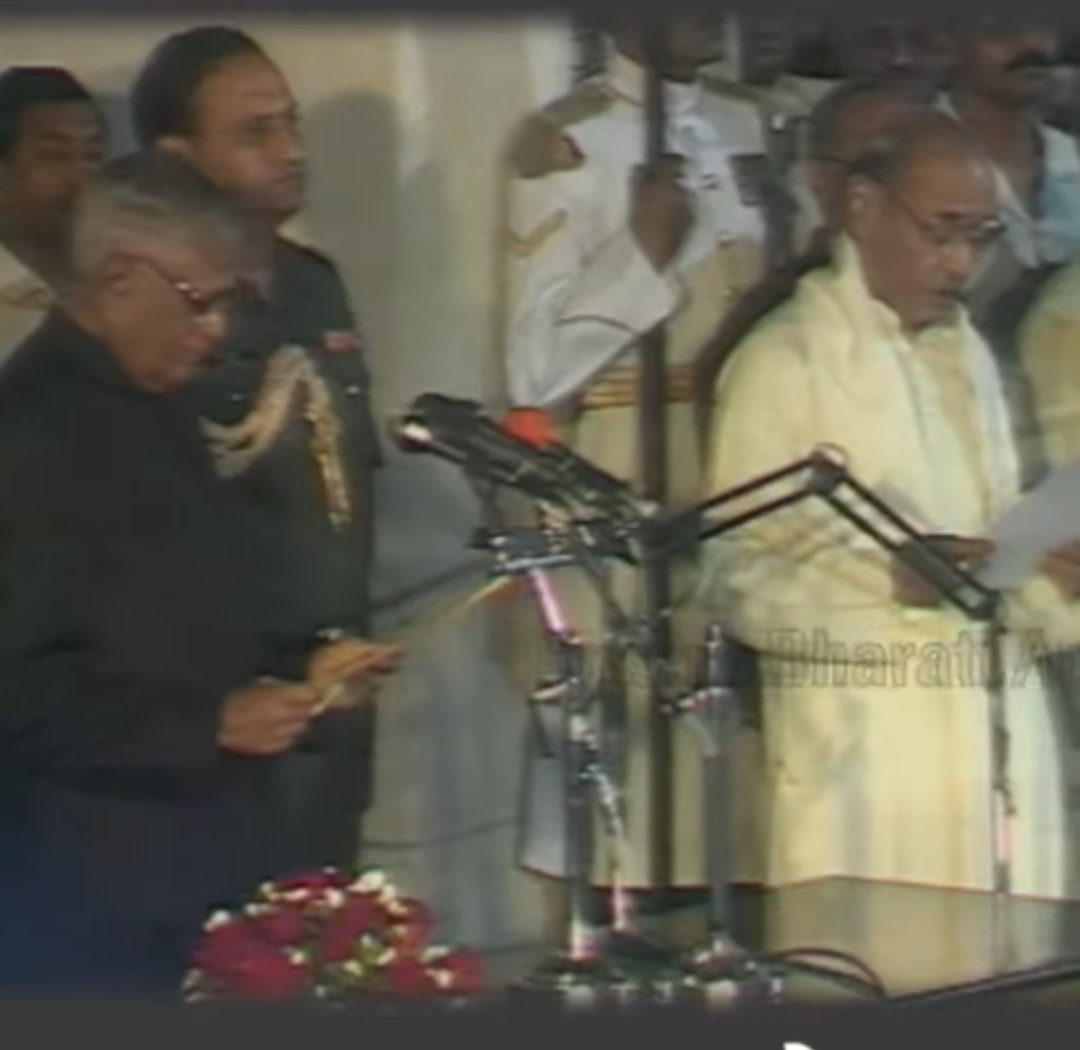
P. V. Narasimha Rao taking the oath of office as India's 9th Prime Minister on 21 June 1991

Rao addressing the inaugural function at National Science Centre, New Delhi in 1992

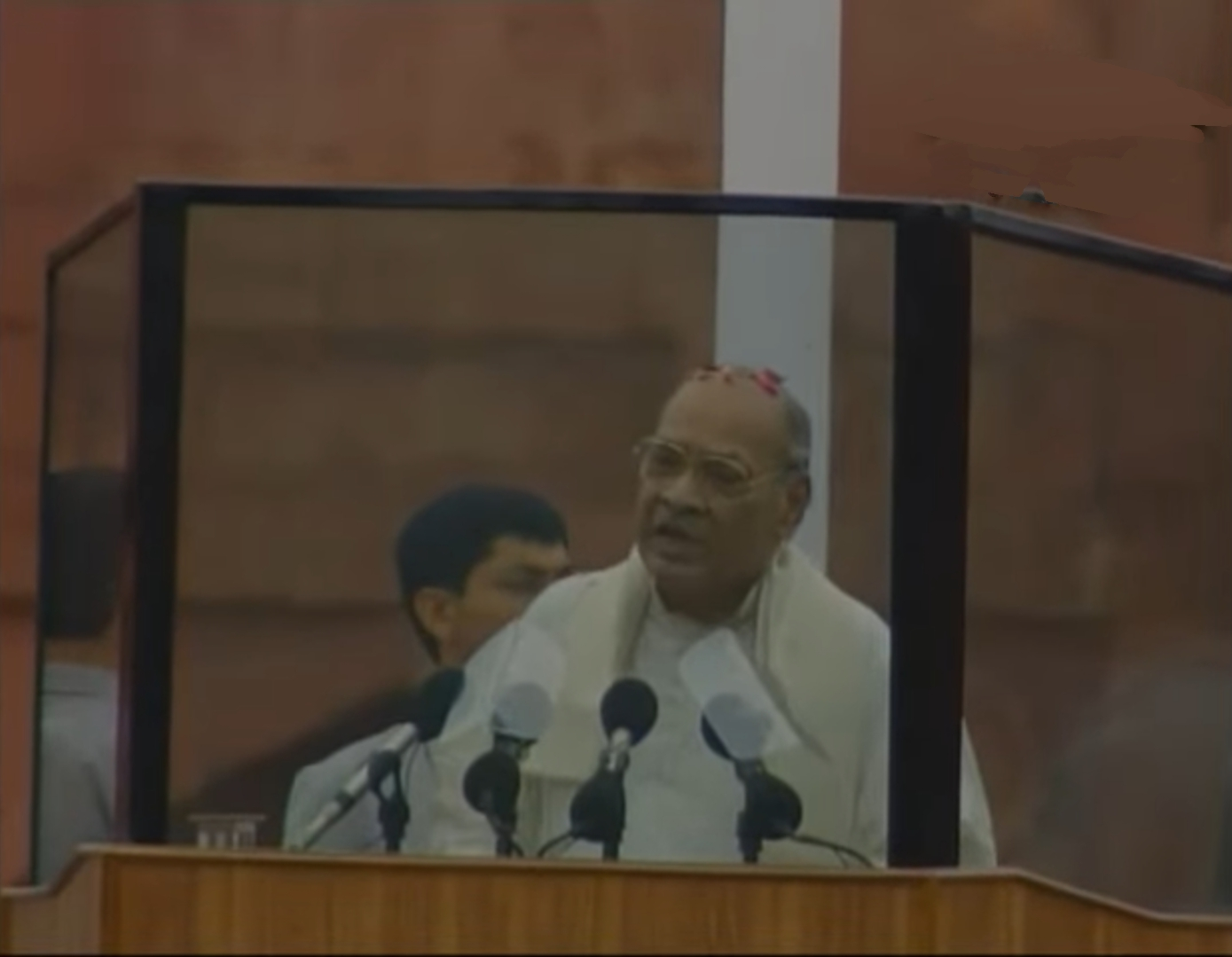
Prime Minister P. V. Narasimha Rao delivering his Independence Day address from the Red Fort, New Delhi (1995)

Adopted to avert the impending 1991 economic crisis, the reforms progressed furthest in the areas of opening up to foreign investment, reforming capital markets, deregulating domestic business, and reforming the trade regime. Rao's government's goals were reducing the fiscal deficit, privatisation of the public sector and increasing investment in infrastructure. Trade reforms and changes in the regulation of foreign direct investment were introduced to open India to foreign trade while stabilising external loans. Rao wanted I. G. Patel as his Finance Minister. Patel was an official who helped prepare 14 budgets, an ex-governor of the Reserve Bank of India and had headed The London School of Economics. But Patel declined. Rao then chose Manmohan Singh for the job. Manmohan Singh, an acclaimed economist, played a central role in implementing these reforms.

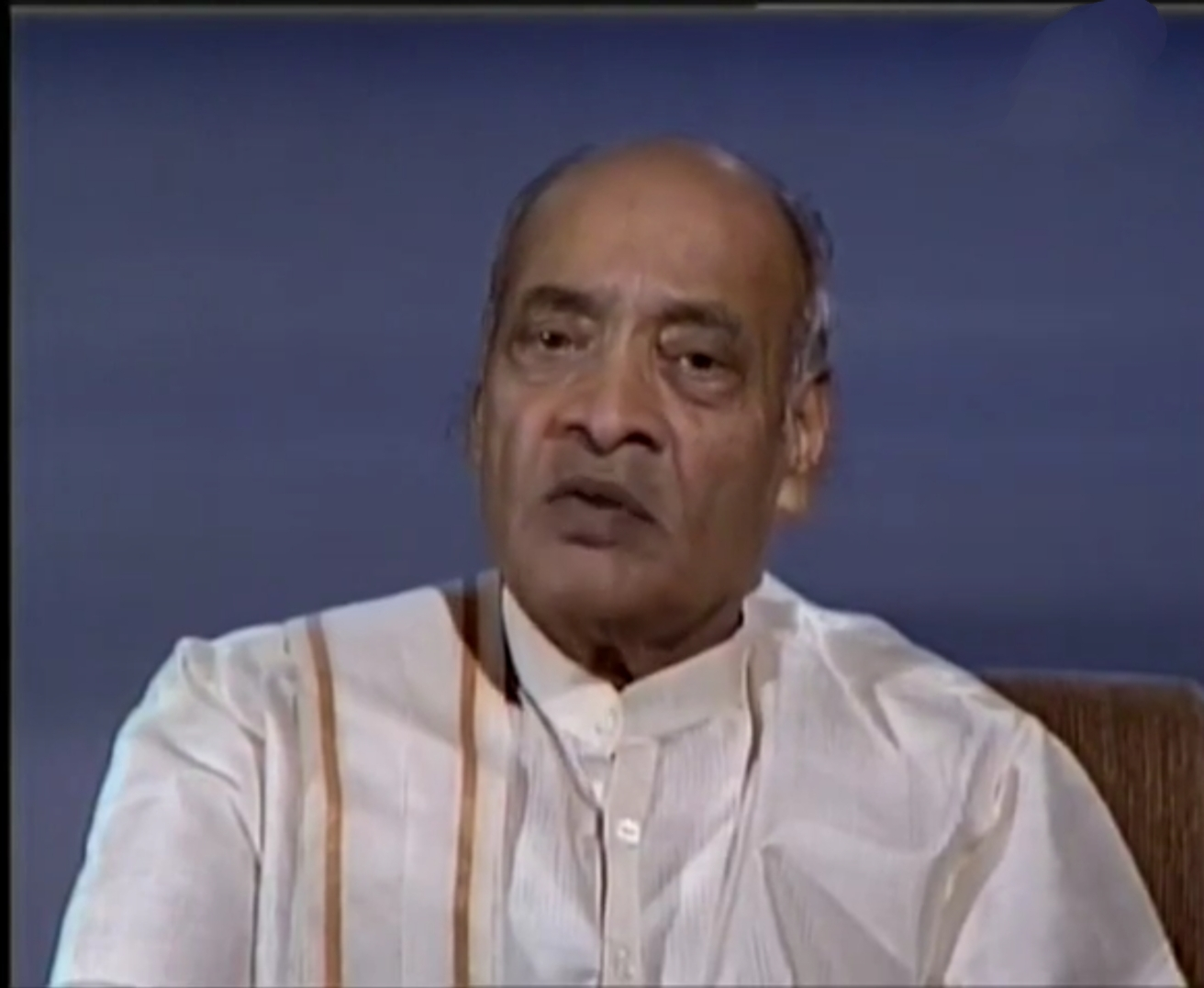
Prime Minister P. V. Narasimha Rao delivering a televised address to the nation in July 1991, outlining the government's economic reforms and liberalisation measures.

Major reforms in India's capital markets led to an influx of foreign portfolio investment. The major economic policies adopted by Rao include:

- Abolishing in 1992 the Controller of Capital Issues which decided the prices and number of shares that firms could issue.
- Introducing the SEBI Act of 1992 and the Security Laws (Amendment) which gave SEBI the legal authority to register and regulate all security market intermediaries.
- Opening up in 1992 of India's equity markets to investment by foreign institutional investors and permitting Indian firms to raise capital on international markets by issuing Global Depository Receipts (GDRs).
- Starting in 1994 of the National Stock Exchange as a computer-based trading system which served as an instrument to leverage reforms of India's other stock exchanges. The NSE emerged as India's largest exchange by 1996.
- Reducing tariffs from an average of 85 per cent to 25 per cent, and rolling back quantitative controls. (The rupee was made convertible on trade account.)
- Encouraging foreign direct investment by increasing the maximum limit on share of foreign capital in joint ventures from 40 to 51% with 100% foreign equity permitted in priority sectors.
- Streamlining procedures for FDI approvals, and in at least 35 industries, automatically approving projects within the limits for foreign participation.

The impact of these reforms may be gauged from the fact that total foreign investment (including foreign direct investment, portfolio investment, and investment raised on international capital markets) in India grew from a minuscule US$132 million in 1991–92 to $5.3 billion in 1995–96. Rao began industrial policy reforms with the manufacturing sector. He slashed industrial licensing, leaving only 18 industries subject to licensing. Industrial regulation was rationalised.

=== National security, foreign policy and crisis management ===
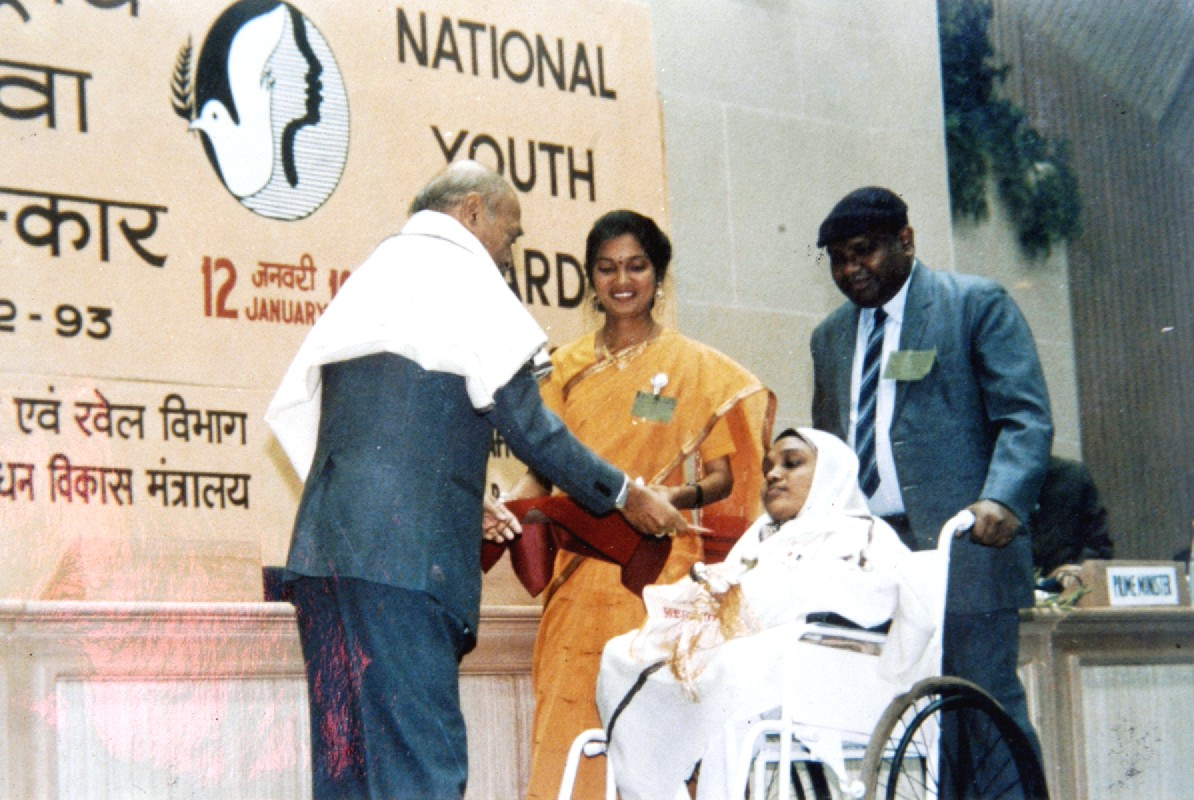
P. V. Narasimha Rao at an awards function, 1993

Rao energised the national nuclear security and ballistic missiles programme, which ultimately resulted in the 1998 Pokhran nuclear tests. It is speculated that the tests were actually planned in 1995, during Rao's term in office, and that they were dropped under American pressure when the US intelligence got the whiff of it. Another view was that he purposefully leaked the information to gain time to develop and test the thermonuclear device which was not yet ready. He increased military spending, and set the Indian Army on course to fight the emerging threat of terrorism and insurgencies, as well as Pakistan and China's nuclear potentials. It was during his term that Khalistani terrorism in the Indian state of Punjab was finally defeated. Also scenarios of aircraft hijackings, which occurred during Rao's time ended without the government conceding the terrorists' demands. He also directed negotiations to secure the release of Doraiswamy, an Indian Oil executive, from Kashmiri terrorists who kidnapped him, and Liviu Radu, a Romanian diplomat posted in New Delhi in October 1991, who was kidnapped by Sikh terrorists. Rao also handled the Indian response to the occupation of the Hazratbal holy shrine in Jammu and Kashmir by terrorists in October 1993. He brought the occupation to an end without damage to the shrine. Similarly, he dealt with the kidnapping of some foreign tourists by a terrorist group called Al Faran in Kashmir valley in 1995 effectively. Although he could not secure the release of the hostages, his policies ensured that the terrorists demands were not conceded to, and that the action of the terrorists was condemned internationally, including Pakistan.

Rao also made diplomatic overtures to Western Europe, the United States, and China. He decided in 1992 to bring into the open India's relations with Israel, which had been kept covertly active for a few years during his tenure as a Foreign Minister, and permitted Israel to open an embassy in New Delhi. He ordered the intelligence community in 1992 to start a systematic drive to draw the international community's attention to Pakistan's sponsorship of terrorism against India and not to be discouraged by US efforts to undermine the exercise. Rao launched the Look East foreign policy, which brought India closer to ASEAN. According to Rejaul Karim Laskar, a scholar of India's foreign policy and ideologue of Rao's Congress Party, Rao initiated the Look East policy with three objectives in mind, namely, to renew political contacts with the ASEAN-member nation; to increase economic interaction with South East Asia in trade, investment, science and technology, tourism, etc.; and to forge strategic and defence links with several countries of South East Asia. He decided to maintain a distance from the Dalai Lama in order to avoid aggravating Beijing's suspicions and concerns, and made successful overtures to Tehran. The 'cultivate Iran' policy was pushed through vigorously by him. These policies paid rich dividends for India in March 1994, when Benazir Bhutto's efforts to have a resolution passed by the UN Human Rights Commission in Geneva on the human rights situation in Jammu and Kashmir failed, with opposition by China and Iran.

Rao's crisis management after the 12 March 1993 Bombay bombings was highly praised. He personally visited Bombay after the blasts and, after seeing evidence of Pakistani involvement in the blasts, ordered the intelligence community to invite the intelligence agencies of the US, UK and other Western European countries to send their counter-terrorism experts to Bombay to examine the facts for themselves.

=== Economic crisis and initiation of liberalisation ===
Rao decided that India, which in 1991 was on the brink of bankruptcy, would benefit from opening its economy. He appointed economist Manmohan Singh, a former governor of the Reserve Bank of India, as Finance Minister to accomplish his goals. This liberalisation was criticised by many socialist nationalists at that time.

He is often referred as 'Father of Indian Economic Reforms'. PV Narasimha Rao: The 10th Prime Minister who changed the face of Indian economy under Rao's mandate and leadership, then finance minister Manmohan Singh launched a series of pro-globalisation reforms, including International Monetary Fund (IMF) policies, to rescue the almost-bankrupt nation from economic collapse.

=== Indian nuclear programme ===
Kalam recalls that Rao ordered him not to test, since "the election result was quite different from what he anticipated". The BJP's Atal Bihari Vajpayee took over as prime minister on 16 May 1996. Narasimha Rao, Abdul Kalam and R Chidambaram went to meet the new prime minister "so that", in Kalam's telling, "the smooth takeover of such a very important programme can take place".

Rao knew he had only one chance to test before sanctions kicked in, i.e., he could not both test conventional atomic bombs in December 1995 as well as the hydrogen bomb separately in April 1996. As Shekhar Gupta – who has had unprecedented access to Rao as well as the nuclear team – speculates: "By late 1995, Rao's scientists told him that they needed six more months. They could test some weapons but not others...thermonuclear etc. So Rao began a charade of taking preliminary steps to test, without intending to test then."

National elections were scheduled for May 1996, and Rao spent the next two months campaigning. On 8 May at 21:00, Abdul Kalam was asked to immediately meet with the prime minister. Rao told him, "Kalam, be ready with the Department of Atomic Energy and your team for the N-test and I am going to Tirupati. You wait for my authorisation to go ahead with the test. DRDO-DAE teams must be ready for action." Rao energised the national nuclear security and ballistic missiles programme. His efforts resulted in the 1998 Pokhran nuclear tests.

Vajpayee said that, in May 1996, a few days after he had succeeded Rao as prime minister, "Rao told me that the bomb was ready. I only exploded it."

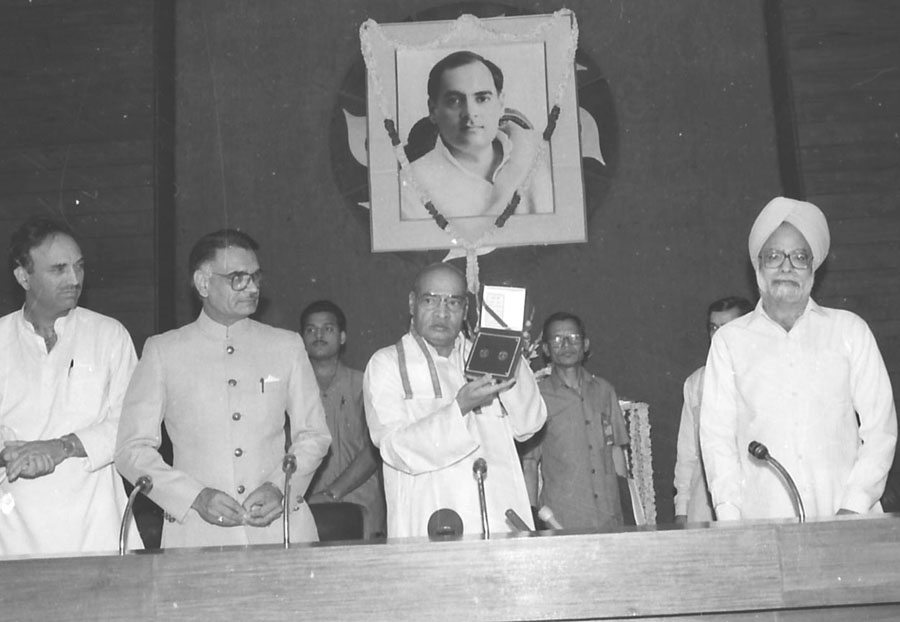
The Prime Minister Shri P.V. Narasimha Rao releasing an onerupee commemorative coin on late Shri Rajiv Gandhi former prime Minister, on the occasion of his first death anniversary in New Delhi on 21 May 1992

"Saamagri tayyar hai," Rao had said. ("The ingredients are ready.") "You can go ahead." The conventional narrative at the time was that prime minister Rao had wanted to test nuclear weapons in December 1995. The Americans had caught on, and Rao had dithered – as was his wont. Three years later, prime minister Atal Bihari Vajpayee fulfilled his party's campaign promise by ordering five nuclear tests below the shimmering sands of Rajasthan.

=== Handling of separatist movements ===
Rao successfully decimated the Sikh separatist movement and neutralised the Kashmiri separatist movement to a certain extent. It is said that Rao was 'solely responsible' for the decision to hold elections in Punjab, no matter how narrow the electorate base would be. In dealing with Kashmir, Rao's government was highly restrained by the US government and its president, Bill Clinton. Rao's government introduced the Terrorist and Disruptive Activities (Prevention) Act (TADA), India's first anti-terrorism legislation, and directed the Indian Army to eliminate the infiltrators from Pakistan. Despite a heavy and largely successful Army campaign, Pakistani Media accuses the state of descending into a security nightmare. Tourism and commerce were also largely disrupted.

=== Babri Mosque demolition ===
In the late 1980s, the Bharatiya Janata Party (BJP) brought the Ram Janmabhoomi issue to the centre stage of national politics, and the BJP and VHP began organising large-scale protests in Ayodhya and around the country.

Members of the Vishva Hindu Parishad (VHP) demolished the Babri Mosque (which was constructed by Mir Baqi, a general of India's first Mughal Emperor, Babur) in Ayodhya on 6 December 1992. The site is believed to be the birthplace of the Hindu god Rama. The destruction of the disputed structure, which was widely reported in the international media, unleashed large scale communal violence, the most extensive since the Partition of India. Hindus and Muslims were involved in massive rioting across the country and almost every major city, including Delhi, Mumbai, Kolkata, Ahmedabad, Hyderabad and Bhopal, struggled to control the unrest.

Rao had assured the Muslims that the Babri Mosque would be rebuilt. The Liberhan Commission, after extensive hearing and investigation, exonerated Rao. It pointed out that Rao was heading a minority government and accepted the centre's argument that central forces could not be deployed by the Union, nor could President's Rule be imposed "on the basis of rumours or media reports". Taking such a step would have created a "bad precedent" damaging the federal structure and would have "amounted to interference" in the state administration, it said. The state "deliberately and consciously understated" the risk to the disputed structure and general law and order. The commission also stated that the Governor's assessment of the situation was either badly flawed or overly optimistic and was thus a major impediment to the central government. The Commission further said, "... knowing fully well that its facetious undertakings before the Supreme Court had bought it sufficient breathing space, it (state government) proceeded with the planning for the destruction of the disputed structure. The Supreme Court's own observer failed to alert it to the sinister undercurrents. The Governor and its intelligence agencies, charged with acting as the eyes and ears of the central government, also failed in their task. Without substantive procedural prerequisites, neither the Supreme Court nor the Union of India was able to take any meaningful steps."

In another interview with journalist Shekhar Gupta, Rao spoke further about the demolition. He said he was wary of the impact of hundreds of deaths on the nation and that it could have been far worse. He also argued that he had to consider the possibility that some of the troops would have turned around and joined the mobs instead. Regarding the dismissal of Uttar Pradesh Chief Minister Kalyan Singh, he said, "mere dismissal does not mean you can take control. It takes a day or so to appoint advisers, send them to Lucknow, and take control of the state. Meanwhile, what had to happen would have happened, and there would have been no Kalyan Singh to blame either."

=== Latur earthquake ===
In 1993, a strong earthquake in Latur, Maharashtra, killed nearly 10,000 people and displaced hundreds of thousands. Rao was applauded by many for using modern technology and resources to organise major relief operations to assuage the stricken people, and for schemes of economic reconstruction.

=== Purulia arms drop case ===
Narasimha Rao was charged for his facilitating safe exit of accused of 1995 Purulia arms drop case. Although, it was never proved.

=== Corruption charges and acquittal ===
In the early 1990s, one of the earliest accusations came in the form of stockbroker Harshad Mehta, who through his lawyer, Ram Jethmalani, revealed that he had paid a sum of one crore rupees to the then prime minister Rao for help in closing his cases.

Rao's government faced a no-confidence motion in July 1993, because the opposition felt that it did not have sufficient numbers to prove a majority. It was alleged that Rao, through a representative, offered millions of rupees to members of the Jharkhand Mukti Morcha (JMM), and possibly a breakaway faction of the Janata Dal, to vote for him during the confidence motion. Shailendra Mahato, one of those members who had accepted the bribe, turned approver. In 1996, after Rao's term in office had expired, investigations began in earnest in the case. In 2000, after years of legal proceedings, a special court convicted Rao and his colleague, Buta Singh (who is alleged to have escorted the MPs to the Prime Minister). Rao was sentenced to rigorous imprisonment up to three years and a fine of 100,000 rupees ($2,150) for corruption. Rao appealed to the Delhi High Court and remained free on bail. In 2002, the Delhi High Court overturned the lower court's decision mainly due to the doubt in credibility of Mahato's statements, which were extremely inconsistent, and both Rao and Buta Singh were acquitted of the charges.

Rao, along with fellow minister K. K. Tewary, Chandraswami and K. N. Aggarwal, were accused of forging documents showing that Ajeya Singh had opened a bank account in the First Trust Corporation Bank in Saint Kitts and deposited $21 million in it, making his father V. P. Singh its beneficiary. The alleged intent was to tarnish V. P. Singh's image. This supposedly happened in 1989. However, only after Rao's term as PM had expired in 1996, was he formally charged by the Central Bureau of Investigation (CBI) for the crime. Less than a year later, the court acquitted him due to lack of evidence linking him with the case.

Lakhubhai Pathak, an Indian businessman living in England, alleged that Chandraswami and K. N. Aggarwal alias Mamaji, along with Rao, cheated him out of $100,000. The amount was given for an express promise for allowing supplies of paper pulp in India, and Pathak alleged that he spent an additional $30,000 entertaining Chandraswami and his secretary. Narasimha Rao and Chandraswami were acquitted of the charges in 2003 and before his death, Rao was acquitted of all the cases charged against him.

== Later life and financial difficulties ==
In spite of significant achievements in a difficult situation, in the 1996 general elections the Indian electorate voted out Rao's Congress Party.

Rao rarely spoke of his personal views and opinions during his 5-year tenure. After his retirement from national politics, he published a novel called The Insider. The book, which follows a man's rise through the ranks of Indian politics, resembles events from Rao's own life.

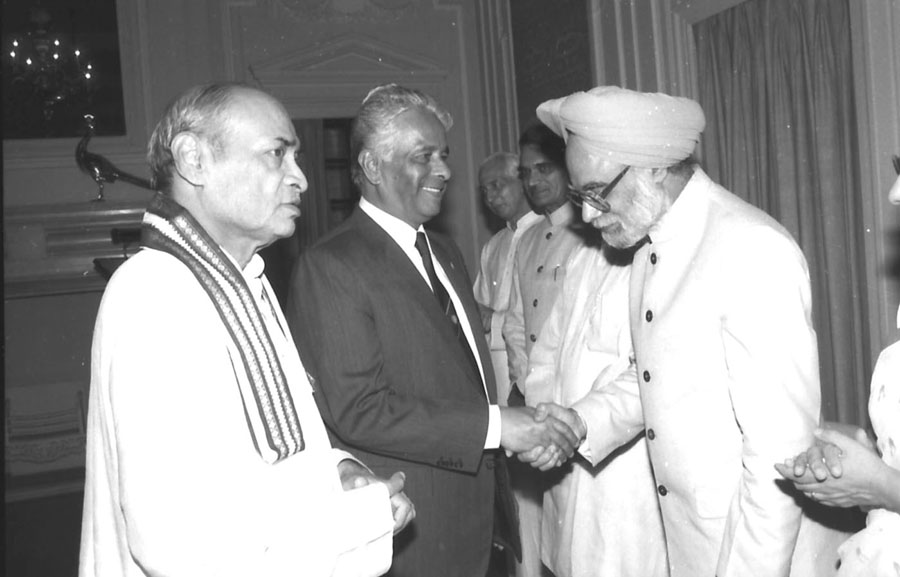
The Mauritius Prime Minister, Mr. Anerood Jugannath greeting the Union Finance Minister Manmohan Singh at the dinner hosted in the former's honour, by Prime Minister Shri P. V. Narasimha New Delhi on 24 July 1991

According to a vernacular source, despite holding many influential posts in the Government, he faced many financial troubles. One of his sons was educated with the assistance of his son-in-law. He also faced trouble paying fees for a daughter who was studying medicine. According to P. V. R. K. Prasad, an Indian Administrative Service (IAS) officer who was Narasimha Rao's media advisor when the latter was Prime Minister, Rao asked his friends to sell away his house at Banjara Hills to clear the dues of lawyers.

== Death ==
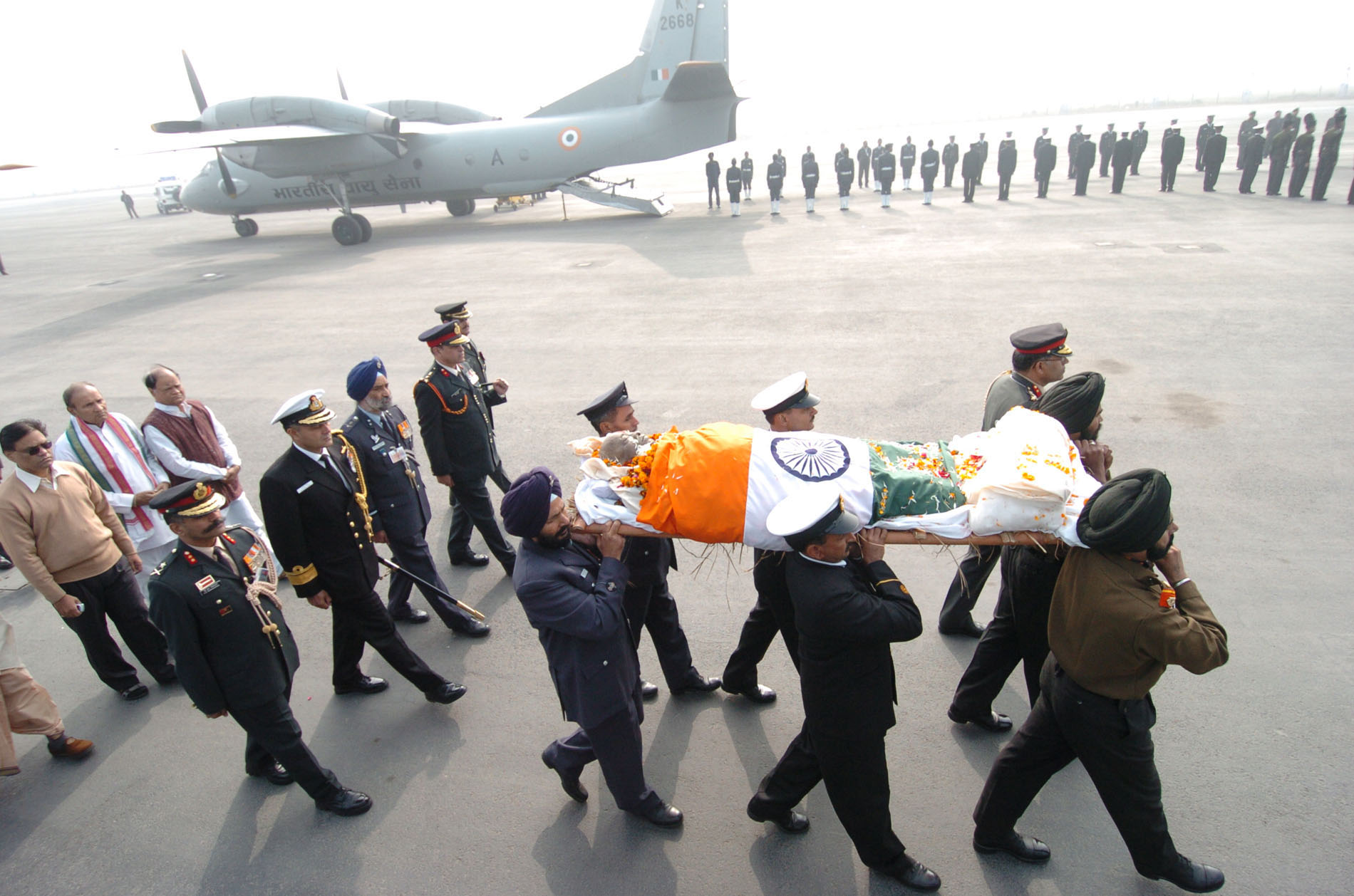
The three wings of India's military services, carrying the mortal remains of P.V. Narshima Rao towards service aircraft at Palam Airport, New Delhi on 24 December 2004 for onward journey to Hyderabad where cremation was performed.

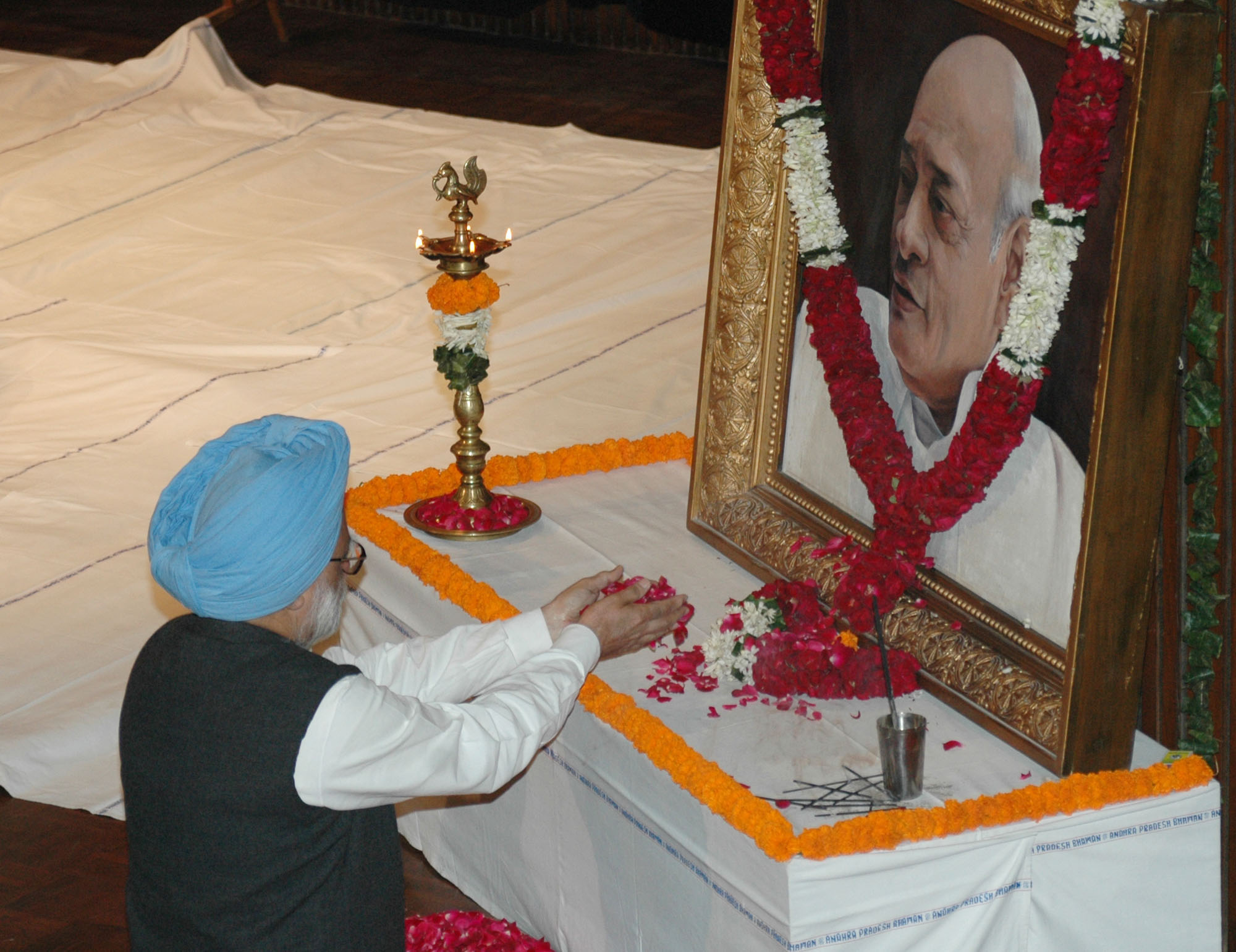

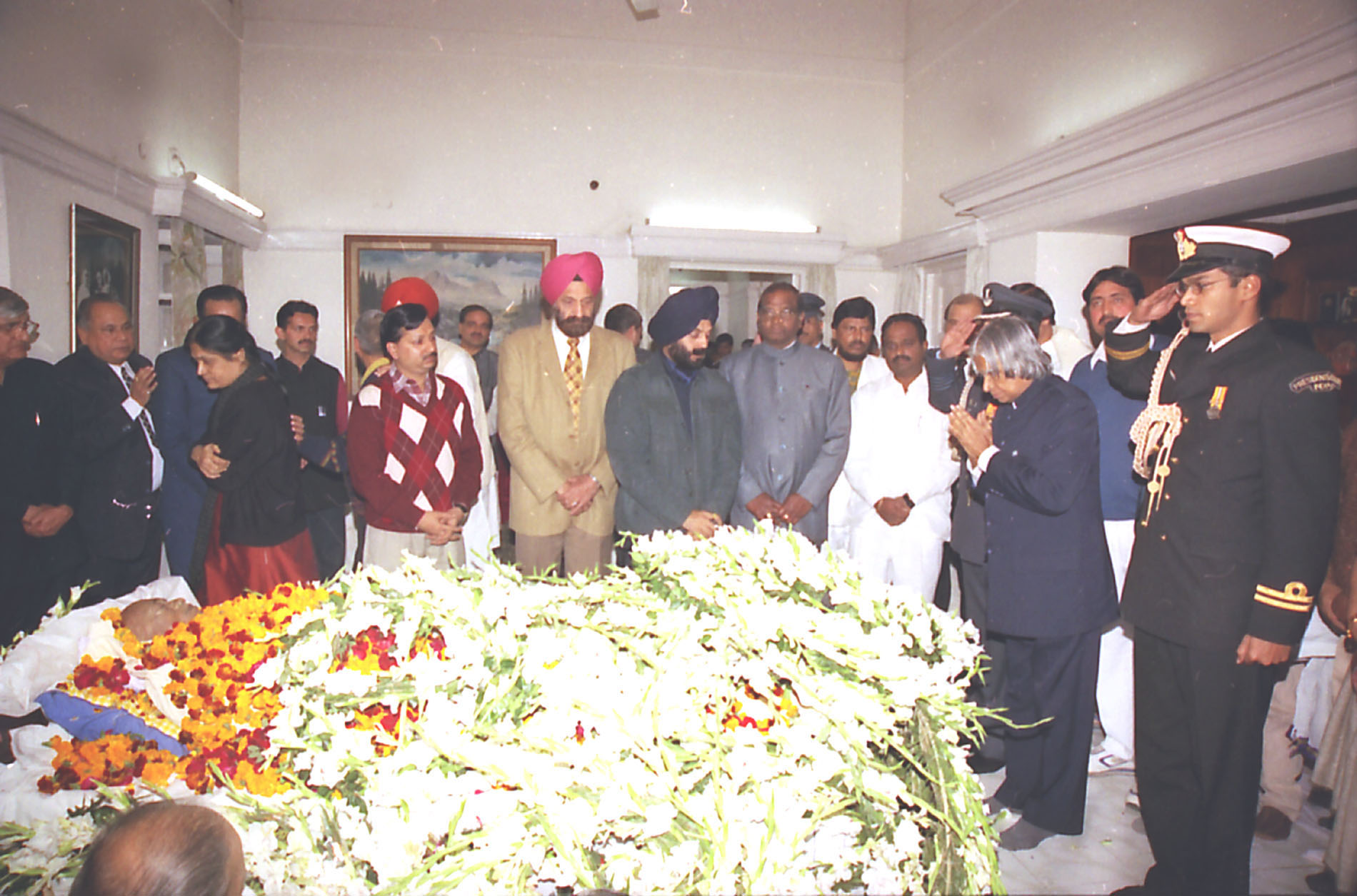
The President, A.P.J. Abdul Kalam paying tributes at the mortal remains of the former Prime Minister Late Shri P.V. Narasimha Rao in New Delhi on 23 December 2004

Rao suffered a heart attack on 9 December 2004, and was taken to the All India Institute of Medical Sciences where he died 14 days later at the age of 83. His funeral was attended by the Prime Minister of India Manmohan Singh, the Home Affairs Minister Shivraj Patil, the Bharatiya Janata Party (BJP) president L. K. Advani, the Defence Minister Pranab Mukherjee, the Finance Minister P. Chidambaram and many other dignitaries. Rao was a long-time widower, since his wife died in 1970 and he was survived by his eight children. A memorial was built for P. V. Narasimha Rao located adjacent to Sanjeevaiah Park, developed in 2005 on 1.2 hectares (2.9 acres) of land known as Gyan Bhumi. The Government of Telangana declared his birthday to be celebrated as a Telangana State function in 2014. Seven days of state mourning was declared upon his death.

In 2015, Narasimha Rao was accorded a memorial in Delhi at Ekta Sthal, which is now integrated with Rashtriya Smriti, a common place for erecting memorials for former Presidents, PMs and others. The memorial is raised on a plinth in marble bearing text highlighting briefly his contributions. The plaque describes Rao: "Known as the scholar Prime Minister of India, Shri P V Narasimha Rao was born on 28 June 1921 in Vangara, Karimnagar District in Telangana state. He rose to prominence as a freedom fighter who fought the misrule of the Nizam during the formative years of his political career. A reformer, educationist, scholar, conversant in 15 languages and known for his intellectual contribution, he was called the 'Brihaspati' (wiseman) of Andhra Pradesh."

== Awards and honours ==
- India:
  - Bharat Ratna (9 February 2024, posthumous)

Rao was honoured with India's highest civilian award, the Bharat Ratna (posthumously) on 9 February 2024 by the Government of India. Rao was awarded the Pratibha Murthy Lifetime Achievement Award. Many people across party lines supported the name of P.V. Narasimha Rao for Bharat Ratna, including Telangana Chief Minister K. Chandrashekhar Rao, and BJP leader Subramanian Swamy. Earlier in 2015, Sanjay Baru said that former PM Manmohan Singh wanted to award the Bharat Ratna to Rao but failed.

In September 2020, Telangana Legislative Assembly adopted a resolution seeking to confer Bharat Ratna on Rao. The resolution also requested the Central Government to rename the University of Hyderabad after him.

== Personal life ==
In 1931, the 10-year-old Narasimha Rao was married to Satyamma, a girl of his own age, belonging to his own community and coming from a family of a similar background. They were married for the entirety of their lives. Smt. Satyamma died on 1 July 1970.

The couple had three sons and five daughters. Their eldest son, P. V. Ranga Rao, was the education minister in Kotla Vijaya Bhaskara Reddy's cabinet and an MLA from Hanamakonda Assembly Constituency, in Warangal District for two terms. The second son, P. V. Rajeshwar Rao, was a Member of Parliament of the 11th Lok Sabha (15 May 1996 – 4 December 1997) from Secunderabad Lok Sabha constituency. The third son is P. V. Prabhakar Rao.

The five daughters of P. V. Narasimha Rao are N. Sharada Devi, wife of N. Venkata Krishna Rao; K. Saraswati Devi, wife of K. Sarath Chandra Rao; Surabhi Vani Devi, wife of S. Divakara Rao; Vijaya Somayaji, wife of Ramakrishna Somayaji; and K. Jaya Devi, wife of K. Revathi Nandan.

Narasimha Rao was a lacto-vegetarian.

== Legacy ==
=== Biographical and political evaluation ===
On the occasion of 25 years of economic liberalisation in India, there have been several books published by authors, journalists and civil servants evaluating Rao's contributions. While Vinay Sitapati's book Half Lion: How P.V. Narasimha Rao transformed India (2016) gives a renewed biographical picture of his entire life, Sanjay Baru's book 1991: How P V Narasimha Rao made history (2016) and Jairam Ramesh's book From the brink to back: India's 1991 story (2015) focuses on his role in unleashing the reforms in the year 1991 as the Prime Minister of India.

=== Literary achievements ===
Rao was a polyglot and could speak 17 languages. In addition to his mother tongue Telugu, he had an excellent command of 10 Indian languages, Bengali, Gujarati, Hindi, Kannada, Malayalam, Marathi, Odia, Sanskrit, Tamil and Urdu, and also spoke 6 foreign languages including Arabic, English, French, German, Persian and Spanish. Due to his college education in Fergusson College in Pune, then an affiliated college of the University of Mumbai (but now with Pune University), he became a very prolific reader and speaker of Marathi. He translated the great Telugu literary work Veyipadagalu of Kavi Samraat Viswanatha Satyanarayana into Hindi as Sahasraphan. He also translated Hari Narayan Apte's Marathi novel Pan Lakshat Kon Gheto (But Who Pays Attention?) into Telugu. He was also invited to be the chief guest of Akhil Bharatiya Marathi Sahitya Sammelan in 2003, where he gave a speech in Marathi.

In his later life, he wrote his autobiography, The Insider, which depicts his experiences in politics.

=== Centenary celebrations ===
In June 2020, Government of Telangana, led by Telangana Rashtra Samithi has declared to organise one-year-long centenary celebrations of Rao. The state government also decided to set up a memorial and five bronze statues at various places, including Hyderabad, Warangal, Karimnagar, Vangara and Delhi.

=== In popular culture ===
In the year 2019, an independent biographical documentary film named P V: Change with Continuity (2019) directed and produced by Sravani Kotha and Srikar Reddy Gopaladinne released on the streaming platform Vimeo. The documentary features rare archival footage and interviews of several distinguished people closely related to Rao's life and work.

Suresh Kumar appeared as Rao in the 2019 film NTR: Mahanayakudu directed by Krish which charts the life of the Indian actor-politician N. T. Rama Rao. The same year, Ajit Satbhai portrayed Rao as the former Prime Minister of India in the film The Accidental Prime Minister by Vijay Gutte, about Manmohan Singh.

Pradhanmantri (lit. 'Prime Minister'), a 2013 Indian docudrama television series which aired on ABP News and covers the various policies and political tenures of Indian PMs, based the twentieth episode – "P. V. Narasimha Rao and Corruption charges against him" – on his term as the country's leader; Ravi Jhankal portrayed the role of Rao.

== See also ==
- 1993 Bombay bombings
- Demolition of the Babri Masjid
- 1993 Latur earthquake
- The Insider (Rao novel)
- P.V. Narasimha Rao Expressway
- List of heads of state and government who were later imprisoned

Party political offices
Preceded by Rajiv Gandhi	President of the Indian National Congress; 1991–1996	Succeeded by Sitaram Kesri
Political offices
Preceded by Kasu Brahmananda Reddy	Chief Minister of Andhra Pradesh; 1971–1973	Succeeded by Jalagam Vengala Rao
Preceded by Shyam Nandan Prasad Mishra	Minister of External Affairs; 1980–1984	Succeeded by Indira Gandhi
Preceded by Prakash Chandra Sethi	Minister of Home Affairs; 1984	Succeeded by Shankarrao Chavan
Preceded by Rajiv Gandhi	Minister of Defence; 1984–1985	Succeeded by Shankarrao Chavan
Preceded by Shankarrao Chavan	Minister of Home Affairs; 1986	Succeeded by Sardar Buta Singh
Preceded by Rajiv Gandhi	Minister of External Affairs; 1988–1989	Succeeded by Vishwanath Pratap Singh
Preceded by Chandra Shekhar	Prime Minister of India; 1991–1996	Succeeded by Atal Bihari Vajpayee
Preceded by Madhavsinh Solanki	Minister of External Affairs; 1992–1993	Succeeded by Dinesh Singh
Preceded by Sharad Pawar	Minister of Defence; 1993–1996	Succeeded by Pramod Mahajan
Diplomatic posts
Preceded by Khaleda Zia	Chairperson of SAARC; 1995	Succeeded by Maumoon Abdul Gayoom
