= Thimmampet =

- Village
- Location in Telangana, India Thimmampet (India)
- Coordinates: 17°58′11″N 79°50′18″E
- Country: India
- State: Telangana
- District: Warangal district

Population (2011)
  - Total: 3,776

Languages
  - Official: Telugu
- Time zone: UTC+5:30 (IST)
- PIN: 506333
- Vehicle registration: TS

Thimmampet is a village in Duggondi Mandal of Warangal district in Telangana state in India.

== Geography ==
Thimmampet is located 30 km (19 mi) from Warangal City, 9 km (5.6 mi) from Narsampet town, and 2 km (1.2 mi) from Laknepalli, a village located in Warangal - Narsampet state highway. It is a village panchayat which also includes another habitation Narayana Thanda. Thimmampet is surrounded by villages Mahammadapuram (North), Rekhampally and Venkatapur (West), Chalaparti and Laknepalli (South), Narayana Thanda and Ramaram (East) and Kammapalli (North-East).

== Population ==
As per 2011 census:

Village population - 3776;

No of households - 800;

No of voters - 2402 (Excluding Narayana Thanda).

== Education and other facilities ==
There is one ZPSS high school and two private schools, however a significant number of students are studying outside of the village.

A mineral water plant is set up by villagers and provides 20 litres of water for just one rupee. Now it became 4 rupees for 20 litres as of 2026

== Agriculture ==
The majority of people are dependent on agriculture and allied activities. Sources of irrigation for cultivation, is mainly Rain Water, Ground Water (Open and Bore wells) and tanks Cheruvulu. Major crops are rice, cotton, chillies (Mainly Tomato Chilli or Warangal Chappatta type), ground nut, maize, vegetables and fruits. Agriculture is in crisis, as in other villages in the district, due to uncertainty, low rainfall, high expenditure, shortage of labour, fluctuations in market price and lack of awareness.
