= Surendra Kumar Yadav =

Surendra Kumar Yadav may refer to:

- Surendra Kumar Yadav (politician), Nepalese politician
- Surendra Kumar Yadav (judge), Indian judge
