= Vangara =

Vangara may refer to:

- Vangara, Srikakulam, a village and mandal in the state of Andhra Pradesh, India
- Vangara, Telangana, a village in the state of Telangana, India
- Vangara Venkata Subbaiah, Telugu actor
