= Satyabhijna Tirtha =

Hindu philosopher

Sri Satyabhijna Tirtha
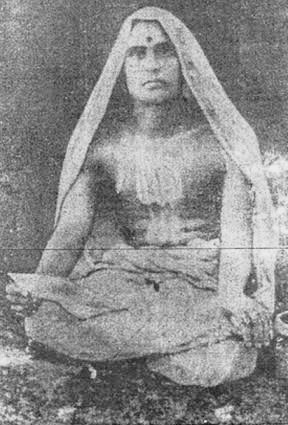

Personal life
- Born: Katti Venkannacharya
- Died: 2 February 1948 Ranebennur

Religious life
- Religion: Hinduism
- Order: Vedanta (Uttaradi Math)
- Philosophy: Dvaita Vedanta

Religious career
- Teacher: Satyaprajna Tirtha
- Successor: Satyapramoda Tirtha

Satyabhijna Tirtha was a Hindu philosopher, scholar and saint. He served as the pontiff of Uttaradi Math from 14 April 1945 – 2 February 1948. He was the 40th in succession from Madhvacharya.

== Bibliography ==
- Sharma, B. N. Krishnamurti (2000). A History of the Dvaita School of Vedānta and Its Literature, Vol 1. 3rd Edition. Motilal Banarsidass (2008 Reprint). ISBN 978-8120815759.
- Rao, C. R. (1984). Srimat Uttaradi Mutt: Moola Maha Samsthana of Srimadjagadguru Madhvacharya.
- Naqvī, Ṣādiq; Rao, V. Kishan (2005). A Thousand Laurels--Dr. Sadiq Naqvi: Studies on Medieval India with Special Reference to Deccan, Volume 2. Department of Ancient Indian History, Culture & Archaeology, Osmania University.
