= Ramayana Kalpavruksham =

Telugu-language epic poetry work

Srimadramayana Kalpavrukshamu
- Author: Viswanatha Satyanarayana
- Original title: శ్రీమద్రామాయణ కల్పవృక్షము
- Language: Telugu
- Genre: Epic poetry
- Publication place: India
- Awards: Jnanpith Award (1970)

Srimadramayana Kalpavrukshamu (transl. Holy Ramayana, the Wish-fulfilling Divine Tree), commonly referred to as Ramayana Kalpavruksham, is an Indian Telugu-language epic poetry work written by Viswanatha Satyanarayana. It is a Telugu rendering of Valmiki's Ramayana. In 1970, Satyanarayana won India's highest literary award, Jnanpith Award for the book. He became the first Telugu writer to receive the Jnanpith Award through this work.

Ramayana Kalpavruksham is considered to be the magnum opus of Viswanatha Satyanarayana and one of the most prominent works of modern Telugu literature. The book written in traditional metre and style is considered a neo-traditionalist work of 20th century Telugu literature. Satyanarayana followed Valmiki in the narration of the story, but made some alterations to the characters and their motivations.

== Reception ==
Gandavarapu Pullamamba reviewed the book positively in the 3rd California Telugu Literary Convention in 2008. Cheemalamarri Brundavana Rao wrote, "Viswanatha's work somewhat deviates from Valmiki's. While Valmiki's Rama is a great human, Viswanatha's Rama is a Bhagawan (God). Since the deviations are meritorious, it is not much of a problem." In 2020, Vice President of India Venkaiah Naidu noted that Viswanatha Satyanarayana was the first writer to impart a true Teluguness to Ramayana through his work.

Peri Ravikumar, a literary critic, calls Kalpavruksam "the first truly Telugu Ramayana". He notes, “The Ramayana was written in Telugu earlier by many great writers. But when you read Viswanatha Satyanarayana’s Ramayana Kalpavruksham it is like reading a book set in a land of the Telugus. You get an impression that Lord Rama is a Telugu and the place where the epic unfolds is Telugu land. The food served is Telugu cuisine and the entire epic is filled with Telugu nativity.”
