= Demolition of the Babri Masjid =

1992 communal riot in India

- Part of the Ayodhya dispute
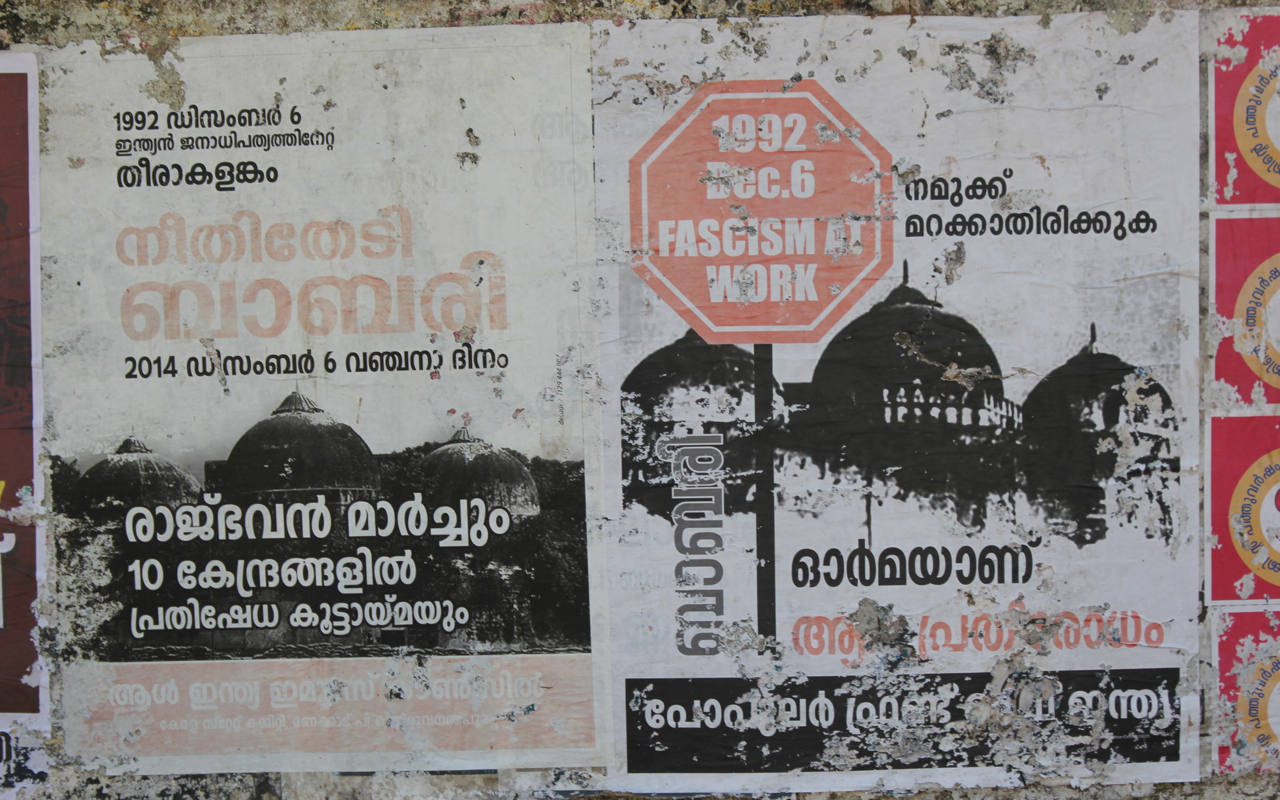
- A poster in Kerala condemning the Babri Masjid demolition

- Ayodhya (India)
- Location: Ayodhya, Uttar Pradesh, India
- Date: 6 December 1992; 33 years ago
- Target: Babri Masjid
- Attack type: Vandalism, cultural destruction, sectarian and communal riots
- Deaths: 2,000-3,000 (including ensuing riots)
- Perpetrators: Vishva Hindu Parishad, Rashtriya Swayamsevak Sangh, Shiv Sena, Bharatiya Janata Party and Bajrang Dal supporters

The Babri Masjid, a 16th-century mosque in the Indian city of Ayodhya, was destroyed on 6 December 1992 by a large group of activists of the Vishva Hindu Parishad and allied organisations. The mosque had been the subject of a lengthy socio-political dispute, and was targeted after a political rally organised by Hindu nationalist organisations turned violent.

In Hindu tradition, the city of Ayodhya is the birthplace of Rama. In the 16th century, the Mughal commander Mir Baqi built a mosque, known as the Babri Masjid, at a site identified by some Hindus as Ram Janmabhoomi, the legendary birthplace of Rama. The Archaeological Survey of India states that the mosque was built on land where a non-Islamic structure had previously existed. In the 1980s, the Vishva Hindu Parishad (VHP) began a campaign for the construction of a temple dedicated to Rama at the site, with the Bharatiya Janata Party (BJP) as its political voice. Several rallies and marches were held as a part of this movement, including the Ram Rath Yatra led by L. K. Advani.

On 6 December 1992, the VHP and the BJP organised a rally at the site involving 150,000 people. The rally turned violent, and the crowd overwhelmed security forces and tore down the mosque. A subsequent inquiry into the incident found 68 people responsible, including several leaders of the BJP and the VHP. The demolition resulted in several months of intercommunal rioting between India's Hindu and Muslim communities across India, causing the death of at least 2,000-3,000 people. Retaliatory violence against Hindus also occurred in Pakistan and Bangladesh.

== Background ==
In Hinduism, the birthplace of the deity Rama, known as "Ram Janmabhoomi", is considered a holy site. This site is often believed to be at the place where the Babri Masjid stood in the city of Ayodhya in Uttar Pradesh: historical evidence to support this belief is scarce. There is a rough scholarly consensus that in 1528, following the Mughal conquest of the region, a mosque was built at the site by the Mughal commander Mir Baqi, and named the "Babri Masjid" after the Mughal emperor Babur. (Note: For opposing views, see Srivastava, Sushil (1991). The Disputed Mosque: A Historical Inquiry. Vistaar Publications. pp. 67–97.) Popular belief holds that Baqi demolished a temple of Rama to build the mosque; historical basis for the belief is debated. Archaeological evidence has been found of a structure pre-dating the mosque. This structure has been variously identified as a Hindu temple, Buddhist structure, Jain temple, earlier mosque, and a secular building.

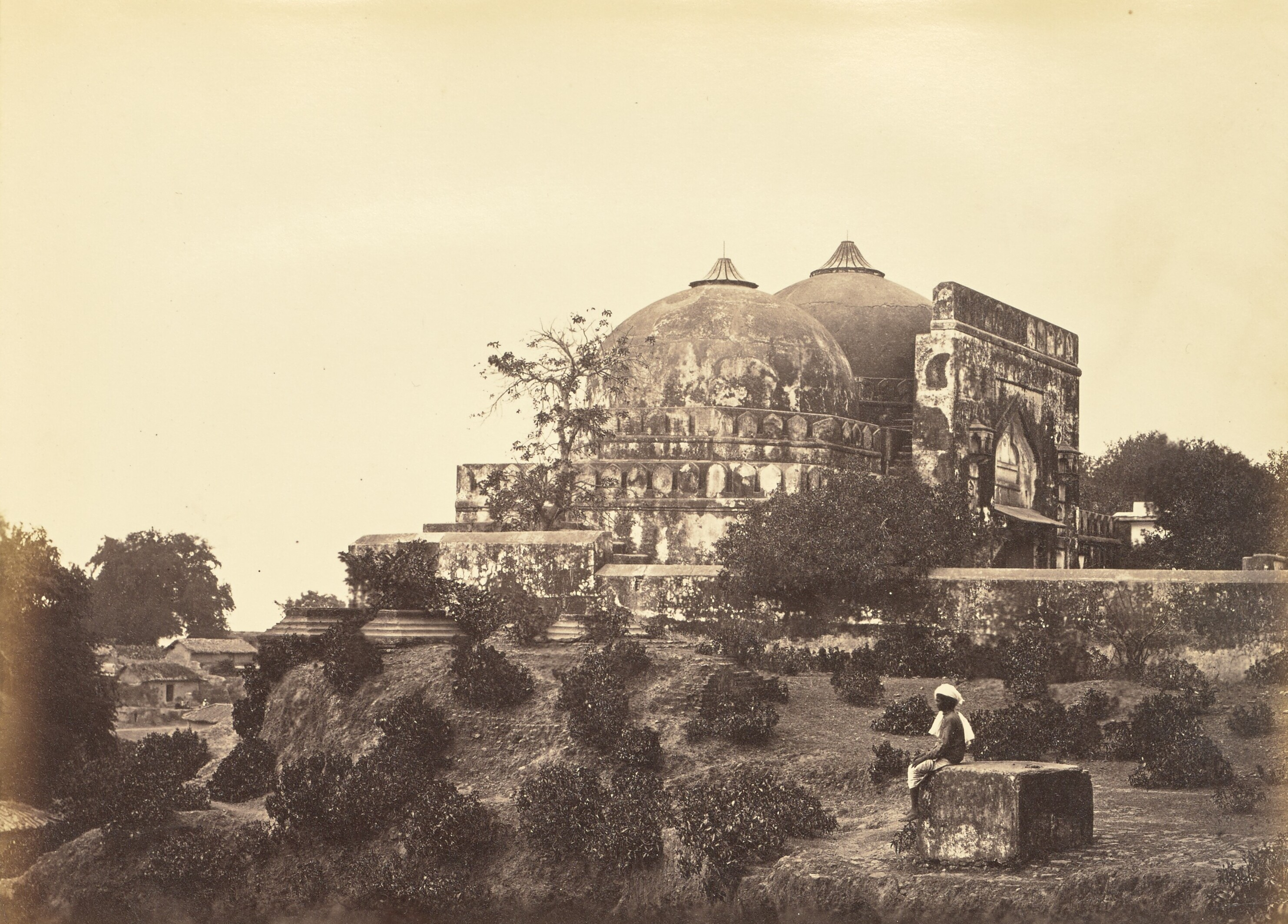
19th-century photo of Babri Masjid

The claim that the mosque stood on the site of a temple was first made in 1822, by an official of the Faizabad court. The Nirmohi Akhara sect cited this statement in laying claim to the site later in the 19th century, leading to the first recorded incidents of religious violence at the site in 1855. The British colonial administration set up a railing in 1859, to separate the outer courtyard of the mosque to avoid disputes. The status quo persisted until 1949, when idols of Rama were reportedly placed inside the mosque, allegedly by Hindu Mahasabha activists. This led to an uproar, with both parties filing civil suits laying claim to the land. The placement of the idols was seen as a desecration by the users of the Masjid. The site was declared to be in dispute, and the gates to the Masjid were locked.

In the 1980s, the Vishva Hindu Parishad (VHP) began a campaign for the construction of a temple dedicated to Rama at the site, with the Bharatiya Janata Party (BJP) as its political voice. The movement was bolstered by the decision of a district judge, who ruled in 1986 that the gates would be reopened and Hindus permitted to worship there. This decision was endorsed by Indian National Congress politician Rajiv Gandhi, at that time the Prime Minister of India, who sought to regain support from Hindus he had lost over the Shah Bano controversy. Nonetheless, the Congress lost the 1989 general election, and the BJP's strength in parliament grew from 2 members to 88, making its support crucial to the new government of V. P. Singh.

In September 1990, BJP leader L. K. Advani began a Rath Yatra, a political rally travelling across much of north India to Ayodhya. The yatra sought to generate support for the proposed temple, and also sought to unite Hindu votes by mobilizing anti-Muslim sentiment. Advani was arrested by the Government of Bihar before he could reach Ayodhya. Despite this, a large body of Sangh Parivar supporters reached Ayodhya and attempted to attack the mosque. This resulted in a pitched battle with the paramilitary forces that ended with the death of several rioters. The BJP withdrew its support to the V. P. Singh ministry, necessitating fresh elections. The BJP substantially increased its tally in the union parliament, as well as winning a majority in the Uttar Pradesh assembly.

== Demolition ==
On 6 December 1992, the Rashtriya Swayamsevak Sangh (RSS) and its affiliates organised a rally involving 150,000 VHP and BJP supporters at the site of the disputed structure. The ceremonies included speeches by BJP leaders such as Lal Krishna Advani, Murli Manohar Joshi and Uma Bharti. During the first few hours of the rally, the crowd grew gradually more restless, and began raising slogans. A police cordon had been placed around the structure in preparation for attack. However, around noon, a young man managed to slip past the cordon and climb the structure itself, brandishing a saffron flag. This was seen as a signal by the mob, who then stormed the structure. The police cordon, vastly outnumbered and unprepared for the size of the attack, fled. The mob set upon the building with axes, hammers, and grappling hooks, and within a few hours, the entire structure, made from mud and chalk, was levelled.

The then Prime Minister P. V. Narasimha Rao has been often criticized for his mishandling of the situation. Rao in his book Ayodhya 6 December 1992 wrote that the demolition was a "betrayal" by the then Chief Minister of Uttar Pradesh, Kalyan Singh, who repeatedly assured the Congress government that the mosque would be protected.

A 2009 report, authored by Justice Manmohan Singh Liberhan, found 68 people to be responsible for the demolition of the Masjid, mostly leaders from the BJP. Among those named were Vajpayee, Advani, Joshi and Vijaya Raje Scindia. Kalyan Singh, who was then the Chief Minister of Uttar Pradesh, also faced severe criticism in the report. Liberhan wrote that he posted bureaucrats and police officers to Ayodhya whose record indicated that they would stay silent during the mosque's demolition. Anju Gupta, a police officer who had been in charge of Advani's security on that day, stated that Advani and Joshi made speeches that contributed to provoking the behaviour of the mob. The report notes that at this time several BJP leaders made "feeble requests to the kar sevaks to come down... either in earnest or for the media's benefit". No appeal was made to the rioters not to enter the sanctum sanctorum or not to demolish the structure. It further noted: "This selected act of the leaders itself speaks of the hidden intentions of one and all being to accomplish demolition of the disputed structure." The report holds that the "icons of the movement present [that day]... could just as easily have... prevented the demolition."

=== Allegations ===
In a March 2005 book, former Intelligence Bureau head Maloy Krishna Dhar claimed that the Babri mosque demolition was planned 10 months in advance by top leaders of the RSS, BJP and VHP, and criticised the manner in which the then Prime Minister P. V. Narasimha Rao handled the issue. Dhar claimed that he was directed to arrange security for a meeting between individuals from the BJP and other constituents of the Sangh Parivar, and that the meeting "proved beyond doubt that they (RSS, BJP, VHP) had drawn up the blueprint of the Hindutva assault in the coming months and choreographed the pralaya nritya (dance of apocalypse) at Ayodhya in December 1992".

The RSS, BJP, VHP and the Bajrang Dal leaders present in the meeting amply agreed to work in a well-orchestrated manner." Claiming that the tapes of the meeting were personally handed over by him to his boss, he asserts that he has no doubts that his boss had shared the contents with the Prime Minister (Rao) and the Home Minister (Shankarrao Chavan). The author claimed that there was silent agreement that Ayodhya offered "a unique opportunity to take the Hindutva wave to the peak for deriving political benefit."

In April 2014, a sting operation by Cobrapost claimed that the demolition was not an act of frenzied mobs but an act of sabotage planned with so much secrecy that no government agency got wind of it. It further said that the sabotage was planned several months in advance by VHP and Shiv Sena, but not jointly.

== Aftermath ==
In protest against the arrest of karsevaks after the demolition, a man later identified as Satish Chandra Pandey attempted to hijack Indian Airlines Flight 810 from Lucknow to Delhi on 22 January 1993. Pandey demanded the release of the arrestees and the construction of a temple at the site of the mosque. Pandey eventually surrendered, and was sentenced to four years in prison.

=== Communal violence ===
The destruction of the Babri Masjid sparked Muslim outrage around the country, provoking several months of inter-communal rioting in which Hindus and Muslims attacked one another, burning and looting homes, shops and places of worship. Several of the BJP leaders were taken into custody, and the VHP was briefly banned by the government. Despite this, the ensuing riots spread to cities like Mumbai, Surat, Ahmedabad, Kanpur, Delhi, Bhopal and several others, eventually resulting in over 2,000–3,000 deaths. The Mumbai Riots alone, which occurred in December 1992 and January 1993 and which the Shiv Sena played a big part in organising, caused the death of around 900 people, and estimated property damage of around ₹ 9,000 crore ($3.6 billion). The demolition and the ensuing riots were among the major factors behind the 1993 Mumbai bombings and many successive riots in the coming decade. Jihadi groups including the Indian Mujahideen cited the demolition of the Babri Masjid as a reason for their terrorist attacks.

=== Investigation ===
On 16 December 1992, the Union home ministry set up the Liberhan Commission to investigate the destruction of the mosque, headed by retired High Court Judge M. S. Liberhan. After 399 sittings over sixteen years, the Commission submitted its 1,029-page report to Indian Prime Minister Manmohan Singh on 30 June 2009. According to the report, the events of 6 December 1992, in Ayodhya were "neither spontaneous nor unplanned". In March 2015, the Supreme Court of India admitted a petition alleging that, with a BJP government in power, the Central Bureau of Investigation (CBI) would not pursue conspiracy charges against senior BJP leaders including L. K. Advani and Rajnath Singh. The Court asked the CBI to explain its delay in filing an appeal. In April 2017, a special CBI court framed criminal conspiracy charges against Advani, Murli Manohar Joshi, Uma Bharti, Vinay Katiyar, and several others.

=== Judicial verdict ===
On 30 September 2020, the court acquitted all the 32 accused including L. K. Advani, Murli Manohar Joshi, Uma Bharti, Vinay Katiyar and several others in the case on account of inconclusive evidence. The special court judge Surendra Kumar Yadav said, "The demolition was not pre-planned."

== International reactions ==
=== Pakistan ===
In Pakistan, the government closed offices and schools on 7 December to protest against the demolition of the Babri Masjid. The Pakistani Foreign Ministry summoned the Indian ambassador to lodge a formal complaint, and promised to appeal to the United Nations and the Organisation of the Islamic Conference to pressure India to protect the rights of Muslims. Strikes were held across the country, while Muslim mobs attacked and destroyed as many as 30 Hindu temples in one day by means of fire and bulldozers, and stormed the office of Air India, India's national airline, in Lahore. The retaliatory attacks included rhetoric from mobs calling for the destruction of India and of Hinduism. Students from the Quaid-i-Azam University in Islamabad burned an effigy of Prime Minister P. V. Narasimha Rao, and called for "jihad" against Hindus. In subsequent years, thousands of Pakistani Hindus visiting India sought longer visas, and in some cases citizenship of India, citing increased harassment and discrimination in the aftermath of the demolition.

=== Bangladesh ===
Following the demolition, Muslim mobs in Bangladesh attacked and burned down Hindu temples, shops and houses across the country. An India-Bangladesh cricket match was disrupted when a mob of an estimated 5,000 men tried to storm the Bangabandhu National Stadium in the national capital of Dhaka. The Dhaka office of Air India was stormed and destroyed. 10 people were reportedly killed, 11 Hindu temples and several homes destroyed. The aftermath of the violence forced the Bangladeshi Hindu community to curtail the celebrations of Durga Puja in 1993 while calling for the destroyed temples to be repaired and investigations be held.

=== Middle East ===
At its summit meeting in Abu Dhabi, the Gulf Cooperation Council (GCC) strongly condemned the Babri Masjid demolition. It adopted a resolution that described the act as a "crime against Muslim holy places". Among its member states, Saudi Arabia severely condemned the act. The United Arab Emirates (UAE), home to large expatriate communities of Indians and Pakistanis, conveyed a more moderate reaction. In response, the Indian government criticised the GCC for what it regarded as interference in its internal affairs. Ayatollah Ali Khamenei, the supreme leader of Iran, condemned the demolition, and called upon India to do more to protect its Muslim population. Although its government condemned the events, the UAE experienced severe public disturbances due to the demolition of the Babri Mosque. Street protests broke out, and protesters threw stones at a Hindu temple and the Indian Consulate in Dubai. In Al-Ain, 250 kilometres (160 mi) east of Abu Dhabi, angry mobs set fire to the girls' wing of an Indian school. In response to the violence, UAE police arrested and deported many expatriate Pakistanis and Indians who had participated in the violence. The Commander-in-Chief of the Dubai Police Force, Dhahi Khalfan Tamim, condemned the violence by foreign nationals in the country.

=== United Kingdom ===
Several temples were attacked by Muslims in the UK, in what were suspected to be acts of revenge. Attacks included petrol bombings and arson. Hindu temples and Sikh gurdwaras, Hindu community centres and other cultural buildings were attacked. One temple was reportedly completely destroyed by fire. Hindu and Muslim leaders appealed for peace following the attacks.

== In popular culture ==
Malayalam author N. S. Madhavan's short story Thiruthu is based on the Babri Masjid demolition. The Ayodhya dispute and the riots following the demolition form part of the backdrop to Antara Ganguly's 2016 novel, Tanya Tania. Lajja (Shame), a 1993 novel by Bangladeshi author Taslima Nasrin, was partially inspired by the persecution of Hindus in Bangladesh that intensified after the demolition of the Babri Masjid.

The documentary Ram ke Naam (lit. 'In the name of Ram') by Anand Patwardhan examines the events preceding the demolition. The Bollywood film Mausam (2011) is based on the events surrounding the demolition. The riots that followed the demolition are an important part of the plot of several films, including Bombay (1995) set in the Bombay riots. Daivanamathil (2005) explores the repercussions of the demolition on Muslims in Kerala. Both Bombay and Daivanamathi won the Nargis Dutt Award for Best Feature Film on National Integration at the respective National Film Awards. The 2007 film Black Friday was based on the 1993 Bombay bombings, which were considered to be a response to the demolition of the mosque.
