= Vangara, Hanamkonda district =

Vangara
- Village
- Location in Telangana, India Vangara (India)
- Coordinates: 18.12°N 79.33°E
- Country: India
- State: Telangana
- District: Hanamkonda
- Mandal: Bheemadevarpalle

Government
  - Type: Gram panchayat
  - Body: Vangara Grama Panchayiti

Population (2011 census)
  - Total: 6,081

Languages
  - Official: Telugu
- Time zone: UTC+5:30 (IST)
- Postal code: 505468
- Telephone code: +91–8727
- Vehicle registration: TS 02
- Nearest city: Huzurabad
- Website: telangana.gov.in

Vangara is a village in Bheemadevarpalle mandal in Hanamkonda district of Telangana, India.

Vangara is well connected with Warangal, Hyderabad and Karimnagar. Nearest Railway Station is Uppal (23 km away). Nearest Airport is Rajiv Gandhi International Airport (185 km away). It got AP Girls Residency School during P.V. Narasimha Rao's rule.

It is famous as the hometown of P. V. Narasimha Rao, a former Prime Minister of India.

== Demographics ==
As of 2011 census, Vangara had a population of 6,081. The total population constitute, 2,973 males and 3,108 females —a sex ratio of 1045 females per 1000 males. 538 children are in the age group of 0–6 years. The average literacy rate stands at 55.84% with 3,396 literates.

== Government and politics ==
Vangara falls under the assembly constituency is Husnabad, which was represented by MLA Vodithela Sathish Kumar from 2018. to 2023 while present MLA is Ponnam Prabhakar.

== Prominent people ==
- P. V. Narasimha Rao, former Prime Minister of India
- P. V. Rajeshwar Rao, former Member of parliament
- Surabhi Vani Devi, Member of Legislative Council
