= Satyaprajna Tirtha =

Indian Hindu philosopher

His Holiness Śri Śri 1008 Satyaprajna Tirtha Sripad
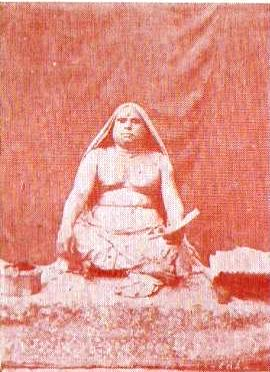

Personal life
- Born: Pandurangi Jayacharya North Karnataka
- Died: 14 April 1945 Athakuru
- Honors: Shri

Religious life
- Religion: Hinduism
- Order: Vedanta (Uttaradi Math)
- Philosophy: Dvaita Vedanta

Religious career
- Teacher: Satyadhyana Tirtha
- Successor: Satyabhijna Tirtha

Satyaprajna Tirtha was an Indian philosopher, Hindu spiritual leader, guru, saint and the pontiff of Uttaradi Math, a matha (mutt) dedicated to the Dvaita philosophy, which has a large following in southern India. He was the 39th pontiff of Uttaradi Math since Madhvacharya, reformer of the Dvaita philosophy from 24 March 1942 to 14 April 1945.

== Bibliography ==
- Sharma, B. N. Krishnamurti (2000). A History of the Dvaita School of Vedānta and Its Literature, Vol 1. 3rd Edition. Motilal Banarsidass (2008 Reprint). ISBN 978-8120815759.
- Rao, C. R. (1984). Srimat Uttaradi Mutt: Moola Maha Samsthana of Srimadjagadguru Madhvacharya.
- Naqvī, Ṣādiq; Rao, V. Kishan (2005). A Thousand Laurels--Dr. Sadiq Naqvi: Studies on Medieval India with Special Reference to Deccan, Volume 2. Department of Ancient Indian History, Culture & Archaeology, Osmania University.
