= Vishwa Madhwa Maha Parishat =

Religious and social organization

- Abbreviation: VMMP
- Founded: 1998; 28 years ago
- Founder: Jagadguru Satyatma Tirtha
- Type: Non-Profit Organization
- Purpose: Interactive Seminars on Dharma Shastra, Dharma Jnana Vahini, Research and Publication
- Location: Bangalore, Karnataka
- Key people: Jagadguru Satyatma Tirtha; Mahuli Vidyasimhacharya
- Website: VMMP Official website

Vishwa Madhwa Maha Parishat (VMMP) (IAST: Viśva-Madhva-Mahā-Pariṣat) is a non-profit, religious and social organization founded in 1998 by Jagadguru Satyatma Tirtha. It is based at the Uttaradi Matha near Bangalore, India. VMMP is striving for more than two decades in the field of publishing the hitherto unpublished texts for the advancement of Sanskrit. Having established units throughout the country, it is imparting Sanskrit education and pravachanas.

== Bibliography ==
- Tripathi, Radhavallabh (2012). Ṣaṣṭyabdasaṃskr̥tam: India. Rashtriya Sanskrit Sansthan. ISBN 9788124606292.
