= Veyi Padagalu =

Novel by Viswanatha Satyanarayana

- Author: Viswanatha Satyanarayana
- Original title: వేయి పడగలు
- Translator: Hindi : PV Narasimha Rao as Sahasraphan
- Language: Telugu
- Publication place: India

Veyi Padagalu (pronunciation: veɪjɪ pədəgɑlʊ, English: "A Thousand Hoods") is an epic Telugu novel written by Viswanatha Satyanarayana. It is a critically acclaimed work of 20th century Telugu literature and has been called "a novel of Tolstoyan scope". The novel has been translated into several other Indian languages. The "hoods" in the title refer to the hoods of the thousand-hooded serpent god who serves as the divine protector of the village where the story is set.

== Background ==
This novel was written for a competition organised by Andhra University in 1934, in which this entry shared the prize with Adivi Baapiraju's Narayana Rao. Viswanatha dictated the novel extemporaneously to his younger brother, Venkateswarlu, who wrote it down. It was completed in 29 days, taking up 999 broadsheets. Many of the author's close associates say the book was influenced by his own life.

Later, it was published in 1937–38 in Andhra Patrika as a serial, and again once more later. Again in 1987–88, it was republished in the golden jubilee edition of the same newspaper.

== Characters ==
- Rameswara Sastry, the hereditary chief minister of Subbannapeta
- Dharama Rao, the son of Rameswara Sastry by his Brahmin wife Savitramma
- Ramachandra Raju, the son of Rameswara Sastry by Rangajamma, his Kshatriya wife
- Pasirika, the son of Rameswara Sastry by Mangamma, his Shudra wife
- Krishnama Naidu, the zamindar of the village
- Ranga Rao, the westernized, England-educated son of Krishnama Naidu
- Harappa Naidu, the only son of Ranga Rao
- Ganachari, the hereditary virgin-oracle of the Subrahmanyeswara, the deity of one of the local temples and a representation of Shiva, who is given the ability to glance into the future
- Girika, a devadasi in the service of Venugopala Swamy, the deity of one of the local temples and a representation of Vishnu

== Summary ==
The story chronicles the lives of those living in a village named Subbannapeta over three centuries. The village's fortunes have a close relationship to the change in traditional social structures like the caste system, the temple, the family, and the farm. These aspects are symbolically represented by the families of Harappa Naidu, Rameswara Sastry, and Ganachari. At the start of the novel, Veeranna Naidu discovers a treasure trove and is convinced by a Brahmin astrologer to found Subbannapeta as a zamindari. He establishes temples for Subrahmanyeswara and Venugopala Swamy, representations of Shiva and Vishnu respectively, and constructs a fort, which offers safety and acts as a seat of traditional learning. The villagers' commitment to the two local temples decreases over the centuries and mirrors the gradual decline and disappearance of traditional culture and the village itself. The hoods of the thousand-hooded serpent that embodies the village's patron god Subrahmanyeswara disappear with this decline, with scarcely two remaining with the passage of time.

== Translations & Adaptations ==
This novel was translated into Hindi by PV Narsimha Rao, former PM of India, as Sahasra Phan ("A Thousand Hoods") in 1968. In turn, it was translated from Hindi into Sanskrit with the same name by Prabhavati Devi, but only as a limited edition spiral book form. In 1995, it was aired on Doordarshan as a TV serial. The radio adaptation of Veyipadagalu as a serial play was broadcast by All India Radio, Hyderabad ‘A’ station with effect from 20 July 2013 every Saturday. The adaptation was scripted by Dr Dittakavi Syamala Devi who penned it in a record time of one month; the role of protagonist Dharma Rao was enacted by Uppaluri Subbaraya Sarma, and that of Arundhati (Dharma Rao's wife) by Vasantha Lakshmi Ayyagari. In 1976, Chandrakant Mehta and Mahendra Dhave translated this novel into Gujarati. Later, R.V.S. Sundaram translated the work into Kannada. In 1998, it was published in a Kannada newspaper as "Nootana". The novel was translated into English by five translators over two and a half years. The five translators are Aruna Vyas, Atreya Sarma Uppaluri, Vaidehi Sasidhar, S. Narayana Swamy, and C. Subba Rao, who edited the volume.
