= Viswanatha Satyanarayana =

Indian Telugu-language writer

Viswanadha Satyanarayana
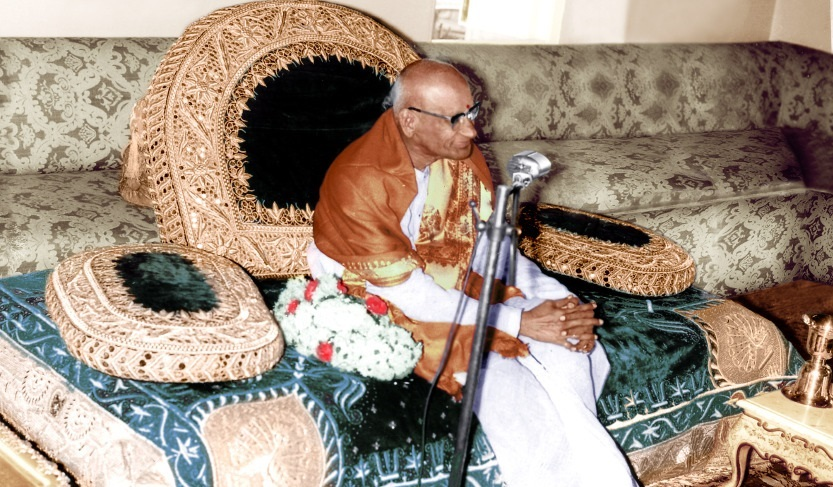
- Born: 10 September 1895; Nandamuru, Krishna District, Madras Presidency, British Indian (now Andhra Pradesh, India)
- Died: 18 October 1976 (aged 81); Guntur, Andhra Pradesh
- Occupation: Poet
- Spouse: Varalakshmi
- Children: 5
- Writing career
- Period: 1919–1976
- Notable awards: Kavisamrat; Kalaprapurna; Padmabhushan; Jnanpith Awardee
- Website: www.viswanadhasatyanarayana.com

Viswanatha Satyanarayana (10 September 1895 – 18 October 1976) was a 20th-century Telugu writer. His works included poetry, novels, dramatic play, short stories and speeches, covering a wide range of subjects such as analysis of history, philosophy, religion, sociology, political science, linguistics, psychology and consciousness studies, epistemology, aesthetics and spiritualism. He was a student of the illustrious Telugu writer Chellapilla Venkata Sastry, of the Tirupati Venkata Kavulu duo. Viswanatha's wrote in both a modern and classical style, in complex modes. His popular works include Ramayana Kalpavrukshamu (Ramayana the wish-granting divine tree), Kinnersani Patalu (Mermaid songs) and the novel Veyipadagalu (The Thousand Hoods). Among many awards, he was awarded the Jnanpith Award in 1970, the first for a Telugu writer, and Padma Bhushan in 1971.

The parallel "free-verse" movement in easy prose of Telugu literature criticised him as a bigot who hung onto the strict rules of poetry such as Yati, Prasa (rhyme) and Chandas (meter). However this only covers a part of the wide variety of literature he created. At the same time, there was no contemporary in Telugu literature who could match his depth of the subjects he covered and his mastery of literature. A book with his memories compiled has been released.

== Early life ==
Viswanatha Satyanarayana was the son of Shobhanadri, a Brahmin landlord, and his wife Parvathi. He was born in their forefathers' place Nandamuru, Krishna District, Madras Presidency (currently in Unguturu Mandal, Krishna district in Andhra Pradesh) on 10 September 1895. He went to Veedhi Badi (literal translation: street school) which were recognized informal schools during 19th and early 20th century in India. During his childhood village culture has made a long-lasting impression on Satyanarayana and he learnt a lot from it.

His upper primary education shifted to well-known Nobel College in near-by Bandar at age 11. His father Shobhanadri, who almost lost his wealth due to his charity by then, thought that English-centric education can help his son to get a good living.

He worked as the first principal of Karimnagar Government College (1959–61). Some of Viswanatha’s disciples formed a committee with Tummalapalli Ramalingeswara Rao and Cherakupalli Jamadagni Sarma as Secretaries and organized Sahasra Purna Chandrodayam celebrations (శ్రీ కవిసమ్రాట్ విశ్వనాథ సహస్ర చంద్రదర్శనశాంతి పౌష్టికోత్సవం) for two days at Vijayawada (14 and 15 September) in 1976. Vedic rituals in the morning followed by Sahithya goshti (meeting) in the evenings marked the occasion.

== Historical Novels ==
Viswanatha was of the view that history is not the story of kings but the narrative that gives one an understanding of the sociological, political, economic, cultural, scientific, spiritual and aesthetic lives of man in a given time, and their evolution. Based on Kota Venkatachalam's chronology Vishwanatha wrote three series of novels depicting all these aspects of ancient and medieval society, along with stories woven around the famous characters of three royal lineages:

1. Purana Vaira granthamala is a series of 12 novels about the Magadha Royal dynasties after Mahabharata war. In this series, there are two tendencies – Krishna representing Dharma, and Jayadratha representing the darker side of human psyche, the unrighteous side. The primary characters in each of the 12 novels behave under the influence of these two tendencies, each having its temporal victories.
2. Nepala Rajavamsa caritra is a series of 6 novels about the Nepali Royal dynasties. This series expounds Carvaka school of thought, its intricacies and sub-schools, social life and values influenced by carvakas.
3. Kashmira Rajavamsa caritra is a series of 6 novels woven around the Royal dynasties that ruled Kashmir.

== Literary career ==
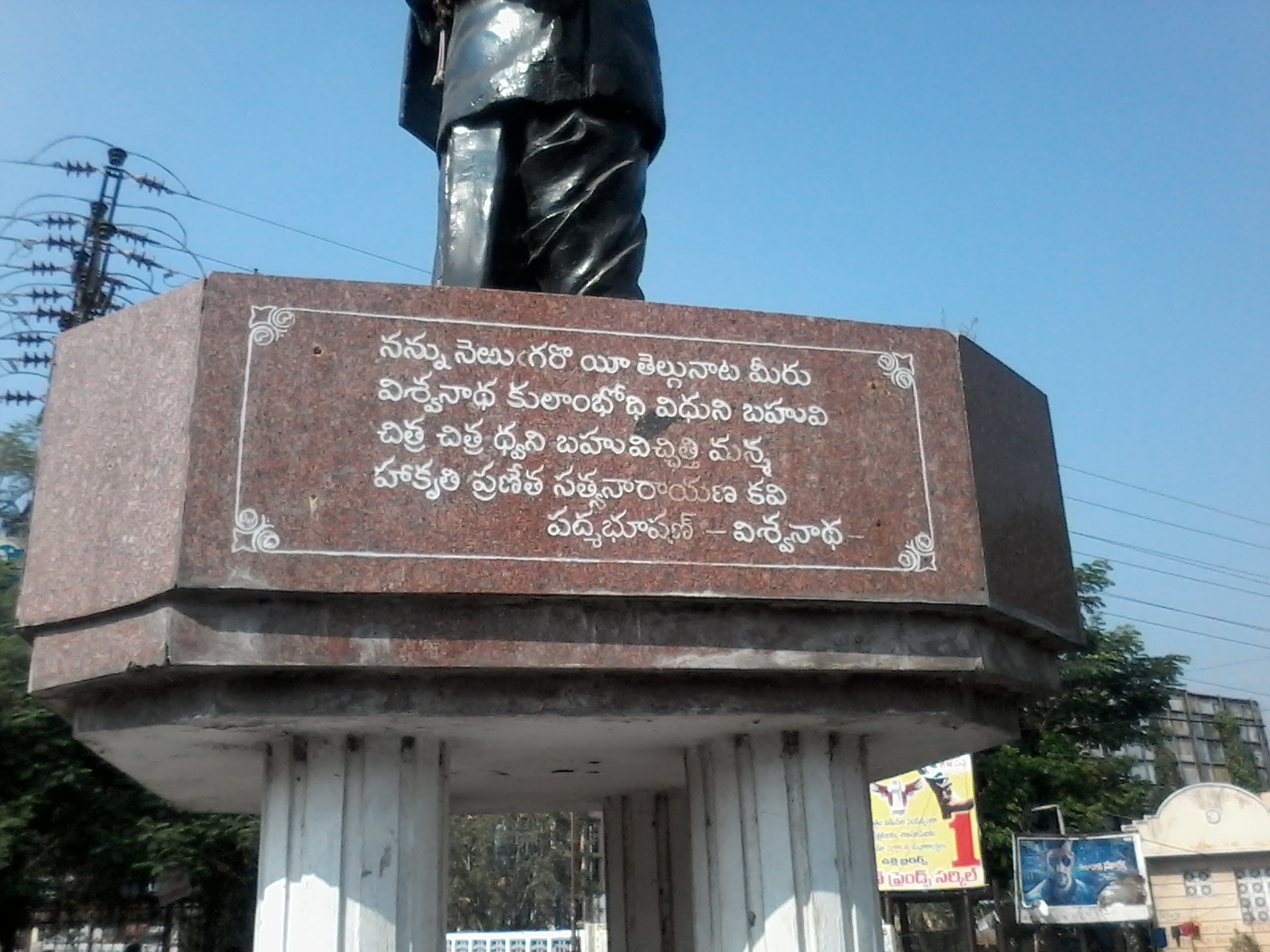
poem of viswanatha satyanarayana about himself

Viswanatha's literary works includes 30 poems, 20 plays, 60 novels, 10 critical estimates, 200 Khand kavyas, 35 short stories, three playlets, 70 essays, 50 radio plays, 10 essays in English, 10 works is Sanskrit, three translations, 100 introductions and forewords as well as radio talks. Some of his poems and novels have been translated into English, Hindi, Tamil, Malayalam, Urdu and Sanskrit.

Veyipadagalu was later translated into Hindi by former Prime Minister PV Narasimha Rao as Sahasraphan.

=== Novels ===
Most of Viswanatha's novels depict evolving social conditions, and involve an in-depth analysis of culture as well as human nature and consciousness.

- Veyipadagalu (The Thousand Hoods)
- Swarganiki Nicchenalu (Ladders to Heaven)
- Terachi Raju (Checkmate)
- Cheliyali Katta (The Seawall)
- Maa Babu (Our babu(babu is a word that suits for son, dad and owner))
- Jebu Dongalu (Pickpocketers)
- Veera Valladu (Valla the valorous)
- Vallabha Mantri (The Minister Vallabha), after Sardar Vallabhai Patel
- Vishnu Sharma English Chaduvu (Vishnu Sharma Learning English), in which Tikkana and Vishnu Sarma two great literary figures of India attempt to learn English from the author. This parody is a critique of English and its grammar. The Novel is being dramatised and Staged in Ravindra Bharati, Hyderabad.in 2006 and made as a tele film by Doordarsanin 2008 and won the Golden Nandi Award.Dr. G.B. Ramakrishna Sastry acted as Viswanadha Satyanarayana and secured the Nandi Award for Best Acting.
- Pulula Satyagraham (Tigers Satyagraha)
- Devatala Yuddhamu (The Battle of Gods)
- Punarjanma (Rebirth)
- Pariksha (Exam)
- Nandigrama Rajyam (Kingdom of Nandigam)
- Banavati
- Antaratma (The Conscient Self)
- Ganguly Prema Katha (Ganguly's Love Story)
- Aaru Nadulu (Six Rivers)
- Chandavolu Rani (The Queen of Chandavolu)
- Pralayanaadu
- Ha Ha Hu Hu, the name of a horse-faced demigod who does a mythical landing in London
- Mroyu Tummeda (The Humming Bee), an in-depth analysis of Traditional Indian Music, sound and consciousness
- Samudrapu Dibba (Ocean Dune)
- Damayanti Swayamvaram (Swayamvara of Princess Damayanti)
- Neela Pelli (Neela's Wedding)
- Sarvari Nundi Sarvari Daka (From Night to Night)
- Kunaluni Sapamu (The curse of Kunala)
- Ekaveera (The sacred Love of two warriors)
- Dharma Chakramu (The Wheel of Righteous Order)
- Kadimi Chettu (A Tree)
- Veera Puja
- Sneha Phalamu (Fruit of Friendship)
- Baddana Senani (The General Baddana)

(The twelve below form Purana Vaira Granthamala Series)

- Bhagavantuni meeda paga (vengeance against god)
- Nastika Dhumamu (the smoke of disbelief)
- Dhumarekha (the line of smoke)
- Nando raja bhavishyati (Nanda will be the king)
- Chandraguptuni Swapnamu (Chandragupta's dream)
- Ashwamedhamu
- Nagasenudu
- Helena
- Puli Muggu (the tiger-rangoli)
- Amrutavalli
- Nivedita

(The six below form Nepala Rajavamsa series)

- Dindu Kindi Poka Chekka (The Betel Nut Under the Pillow)
- Chitli Chitlani Gajulu (The half broken bangles)
- Saudamini
- Lalita Pattanapu Rani (Queen of the town named after Lalita)
- Dantapu Duvvena (Ivory Comb)
- Duta Meghamu (Cloud-messenger)

(The six below form Kashmira Rajavamsa series)

- Kavalalu (Twins)
- Yasovati
- Patipettina Nanemulu (The Buried Coins)
- Sanjeevakarani (The Medicinal Herb)
- Mihirakula
- Bhramara Vasini (Goddess of the Humming Bee)

=== Poetry ===
- Srimad Ramayana Kalpavrukshamu ('Ramayana the divine wish-granting tree', the work for which he was awarded Jnanapith)
- Andhra Pourushamu (The Andhra valor)
- Andhra Prashasti (Fame of Andhras)
- Ritu samharamu (ending of the season cycle)
- Sri Kumarabhyudayamu (emergence of Kumara)
- Girikumaruni prema geetaalu (love songs of Giri Kumara)
- Gopalodaharanamu (about Gopala)
- Gopika geetalu (the gopika's songs)
- Jhansi Rani
- Pradyumnodayamu (rise of Pradyumna)
- Bhramara geetalu (songs of the humming bee)
- Maa swamy (Our Lord)
- Ruru charitramu (Story of Ruru)
- Varalakshmi trishati (300 to Varalakshmi)
- Devi trishati (in Sanskrit, 300 verses in devotion to the mother goddess)
- Vishwanatha Panchashati (500 verses to devatas)
- Vishwanatha madhyaakkaralu (series of poems written in the meter 'madhyaakkara')
- Veni bhangamu (violating the stream/plat)
- Sashi duutamu (moon-messenger)
- Sringara veedhi (the streets of romance)
- Sri Krishna Sangeetamu (Krishna music)
- Naa Ramudu (My Rama, an introductory to his concept of Rama expounded in the Kaplavrikshamu)
- Sivarpanamu (ode to Siva)
- Dharmapatni (consort)
- Bhrashta yogi (fallen yogi)
- Kedara gowla
- Goloka vasi (the lord of Goloka)

=== Drama/Plays ===
- Gupta Pasupatam (the secret Pasupata, in Sanskrit and rewritten in Telugu)
- Amrita Sarmistham (in Sanskrit)
- Anta Natakame (all is drama)
- Anarkali
- Kavyaveda Harischandra
- Talli leni pilla (motherless girl)
- Trishulamu (the trident)
- Nartanashala (the dance theater)
- Pravahamu (the flow)
- Lopala-bayata (in & out)
- Venaraju
- Ashokavanamu
- Shivaji – roshanara
- Dhanya kailasamu
- A collection of 16 short plays

=== Analysis ===
- Kavya Parimalamu (the fragrance of poetry, on aesthetics)
- Kavyanandamu (analysis of aesthetics)
- Shakuntalamu yokka abhijnanata (apprisal of Kalidasa's Abhijnana Shakuntalam)
- Allasani vari allika jigibigi (an apprisal of Peddana's poetry)
- Okadu nachana somanna (an apprisal of Nachana Somanna's poetry)
- Nannayyagari prasanna katha kalitartha yukti (an apprisal of Nannayya's poetry)
- Sitaayaascharitam mahat (great is the story of Sita)
- Kalpavriksha rahasyamulu (secrets of the Kalpavrikshamu)
- Vishwanatha sahityopanyasamulu (a collection of speeches on literature)
- Niti Gita (moral stories)
- Sahitya Surabhi (a primer on poetry and literature)

=== Other Writings ===
- Kinnerasani Patalu
- Yati geetamu
- Kokilamma Pelli
- Paamu paata
- Chinna kathalu
- What is Ramayana to me
- Atma katha

== Awards ==
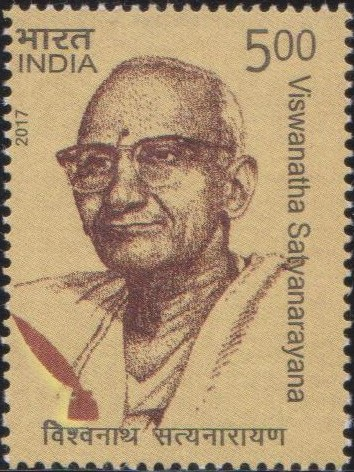
Satyanarayana on a 2017 stamp of India

- He was given the honorific "Kavi Samrat" (emperor of poets).
- In 1964 Andhra Viswa Kala Parishat gave him the honorific "Kalaprapoorna".
- In 1942 on Sankranthi at Gudivada he was honored by climbing him on the elephant(gajarohana). 60 years completion celebrations(shashtipoorthi) was also held at Gudivada in 1956.
- Sri Venkateswara University honored him by giving D. Lit. Degree.
- In 1962 Kendra Sahitya Academy Puraskaram was given for "viswanatha madhyakkaralu".
- In 1970 he was honored as Andhra Pradesh Government's laureate.
- In 1970 Indian government awarded Padma Bhushan.
- In 1971 he was awarded with Jnanpith Award for his book Ramayana Kalpavruksham. He was the first Telugu writer to receive Jnanpith Award.
