= Ayodhya 6 December 1992 =

2006 book by Narasimha Rao

- Author: P. V. Narasimha Rao
- Language: English
- Series: Ayodhya dispute
- Publisher: Penguin Books
- Publication date: 2006
- Publication place: India
- ISBN: 0-670-05858-0
- Website: At Google books

Ayodhya 6 December 1992 is a book written by P. V. Narasimha Rao, the tenth Prime Minister of India, and published by Penguin Books on 1 August 2006.

== Introduction ==
Narasimha Rao had decreed that the book be published after his death, and accordingly it was published in August 2006. He claims that the book is not an “exercise in self-righteousness or justification”, the content of the book indicate an attempt by him to absolve himself and his government of the responsibility for the failure to prevent the removal of the controversial structure known as Babri Masjid. Narasimha Rao had assumed office in June 1991, and by that time the Ramjanamabhoomi-Babri Masjid issue was already in a state of serious alarm requiring intervention, including state intervention, to resolve the issue.

== Reason ==
The book attempts to offer the explanation rather than an answer to two baffling questions, namely,

- In view of thousands of Karsevaks converging in the Hindu holy city of Ayodhya from all over India, including some of them from Nepal and other countries of the world, why did the federal government did not take necessary and adequate steps to protect the controversial structure (that is, the Babari Masjid) from possible damage?
- The reason for non-dismissal of the state government of Uttar Pradesh, headed by Kalyan Singh, by invoking Article 356 of the Indian constitution.

The book endeavors to convince the readers that there was no lapse on his part as the head of the government of India or his government to protect the controversial structure. He concluded “there was no lapse on the part of the Central Government and that if the State Government had at least made use of the central force in time and meaningfully, the Babari structure could certainly have been saved on December, 1992.”

== Book reviews ==
- Frontline India
