= Satyatma Tirtha =

Hindu guru

His Holiness Śrī Śrī 1008 Śrī Satyātma Tīrtha Śrīpād
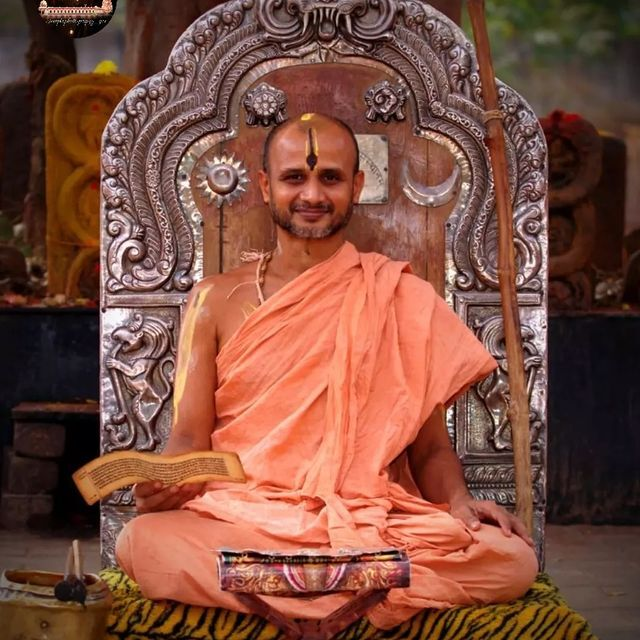
- Sri Satyatma Tirtha in 2022

Personal life
- Born: Sarvajnacharya Guttal; 8 March 1973 Mumbai, Maharashtra
- Parents: Rangacharya Guttal (father); K. S. Rukmabai (mother)
- Honors: Abhinava Raghūttama

Religious life
- Religion: Hinduism
- Order: Vedānta (Uttaradi Math)
- Founder of: Vishwa Madhwa Maha Parishat
- Philosophy: Dvaita Vedānta
- Ordination: 3 November 1997
- Consecration: 24 April 1996

Religious career
- Teacher: Satyapramoda Tīrtha

Sri Satyatma Tirtha (IAST: Śrī Satyātma-tīrtha) (born 8 March 1973), is an Indian Hindu philosopher, guru, scholar, spiritual leader, saint and the present pontiff of Uttaradi Math. He is the 42nd pontiff of Uttaradi Math since Madhvacharya, the chief proponent and the one who rejuvenated the Dvaita philosophy (Tattvavada). Satyatma Tirtha founded Vishwa Madhwa Maha Parishat, a non-profit, religious and social organization in 1998.

== Early life ==
He was born in a prominent family of scholars on 8 March 1973 to Pandit Rangacharya Guttal and K.S. Rukmabai in Mumbai, Maharashtra, India and was named Sarvajna (Sarvajnacharya). He was also known as Vidyadhiraja. Pandit Rangacharya is the pūrvāśrama (previous to sannyāsa order) son of Shri Satyapramoda Tīrtha Swamiji.

== Sannyasa ==
Sarvajna became a sannyāsi at the age of 23, directly from brahmacharya at Raghūttama Tīrtha Brundāvana, Tirukoilur (in Tamil Nadu) in the presence of Shri Satyapramoda Tīrtha Swamiji on 24 April 1996 and was renamed as Satyātma Tīrtha. He is also known as Abhinava Raghūttama Tīrtharu since he received sannyasa directly from brahmacharya. Shri Satyātma Tīrtha Swamiji is only the second pontiff of Uttaradi Math to receive sannyāsa from brahmacharya.

== Social responsibility ==
Shri Satyatma Tirtha, through Uttaradi Math, encouraged water harvesting and management expert, the waterman of India and Ramon Magsaysay Award winner Rajendra Singh to give lecture on water conservation and other topics. Through Uttaradi Math and jointly with Vishwa Madhwa Maha Parishat, he gives needy students about ₹5 lakhs (about US$10,000) each year.

=== Flood relief ===
He has supplied relief materials to flood victims of Bellary, Vijayapura, Raichur and Bagalkot districts during 2009 floods and also took measures to construct 100 low cost houses to those who lost houses in the flood. He has also adopted a rural village in Raichur, Karnataka for integrated development of the village. He is reportedly trying to redefine the role of religious "math" in modern-day society, so that present day "math" should try to get rid of evils of modern society.

== Spiritual discourses ==
His spiritual discourses (pravacana) attract large gatherings, mainly from followers of Madhvacharya and he specialises in talks on Vedic subjects. He has given spiritual discourses at several places like Bangalore, Kalaburgi, Malkheda, Udupi, Rajahmundry, Bhagyanagara (Hyderabad (India),) Pune, Raichur, Dharwad and Chennai. He has also conducted personality development programmes and has written several books on topics like personality development, religion and philosophy. Satyatma Tirtha, as the present head of Uttaradi Matha, has also encouraged other authors to write books on religious experiences. He has given discourses in various languages including Kannada, Telugu, Hindi, Marathi and English. He also has a good knowledge of contemporary religions.

=== Books based on his discourses ===
Book	Description	Author/Editor	Language(s)	First edition	Publisher	ISBN
Satyātma Sudhā	An Anthology of Lectures by Shri Satyatma Tirtha Swamiji	Kadaramandalagi Kanteshacharya (Original compilation-Kannada); E. D. Narahari (English)	Kannada, English and Hindi	2012	Vishwa Madhwa Maha Parishat	ISBN 978-81-903-3362-7

Book	Description	Author/Editor	Language(s)	First edition	Publisher
The Quest	A compilation of Question-and-Answer sessions held at the famous Kala Bhavan	Kadaramandalagi Kanteshacharya (Original compilation-Kannada); E. D. Narahari (English)	Kannada, English and Hindi	2012	Vishwa Madhwa Maha Parishat
Dheemahi: The Glory of Gayatri Mantra	A compilation on discourses of Satyatma Tirtha Swamiji on Gayatri Mantra	Kadaramandalagi Kanteshacharya (Original compilation-Kannada); E. D. Narahari (English)	Kannada, English and Hindi	2018	Vishwa Madhwa Maha Parishat
Atma Lahari	A compilation on collection of lectures by Satyatma Tirtha	Kadaramandalagi Kanteshacharya (Original compilation-Kannada); E. D. Narahari (English)	Kannada, English and Hindi	2017	Vishwa Madhwa Maha Parishat

== Chaturmasya deeksha ==
Generally "Parivrajakas" (Dandi Swamis) are to be on the move as the word "Vraja" indicates but during the Chaturmasa period they have to stay-put in one place. Moving out either for yatra or for other reasons is violation of Shastras and Yati Dharma. During this season of Chaturmasya, the wandering mendicants (Yatis) takes Chaturmasya deeksha, stay at a suitable place and become fully engrossed in contemplation of God. In 2017, Satyatma Tirtha spent his Chaturmasya deeksha in Palamoor in Telangana from (18 July 2017 – 6 September 2017).

== See also ==
- Dvaita Vedanta
- Works of Madhvacharya
- Works of Jayatirtha
- Uttaradi Matha

== Bibliography ==
- Sharma, B. N. Krishnamurti (2000). A History of the Dvaita School of Vedānta and Its Literature, Vol 1. 3rd Edition. Motilal Banarsidass (2008 Reprint). ISBN 978-81-208-1575-9.
- Olivelle, Patrick (1992). The Samnyasa Upanisads. Oxford University Press. ISBN 978-0-19-507045-3.
- Deussen, Paul; Bedekar, V.M.; Palsule, G.B. (1 January 1997). Sixty Upanishads of the Veda. Motilal Banarsidass. ISBN 978-81-208-1467-7.
- Naqvī, Ṣādiq; Rao, V. Kishan (2005). A Thousand Laurels--Dr. Sadiq Naqvi: Studies on Medieval India with Special Reference to Deccan, Volume 2. Department of Ancient Indian History, Culture & Archaeology, Osmania University.
- Bhushan, Ravi (2005). Reference India: Biographical Notes about Men & Women of Achievement of Today & Tomorrow, Volume 3. Rifacimento International.
