= Satyapramoda Tirtha =

Indian Philosopher (1918–1997)

His Holiness Śrī Śrī 1008 Śrī Satyapramoda Tirtha Śrīpād
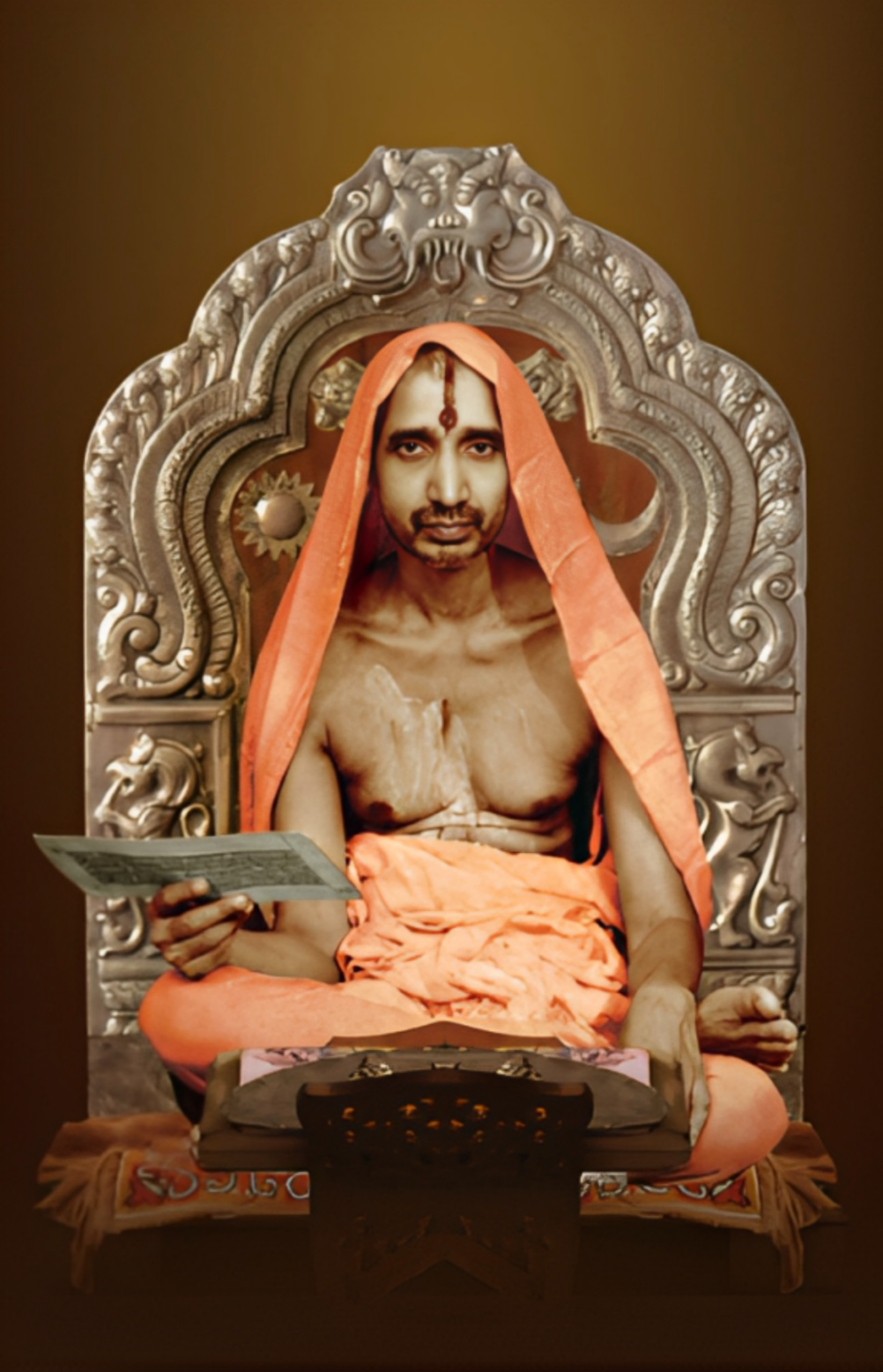
- Satyapramoda Tirtha

Personal life
- Born: Gururajacharya Guttal; 28 August 1918 Dharwad, Karnataka
- Died: 3 November 1997 (aged 79) Tirukoilur, Tamil Nadu
- Notable work(s): Nyayasudha Mandanam, Yuktimallika Vyakhyana
- Honors: Tarka Shiromani

Religious life
- Religion: Hinduism
- Order: Vedanta (Uttaradi Math)
- Founder of: Jayateertha Vidyapeetha
- Philosophy: Dvaita Vedanta

Religious career
- Teacher: Satyabhijna Tirtha
- Successor: Satyatma Tirtha

Satyapramoda Tirtha (IAST:Satyāpramoda Tīrtha; 28 August 1918 – 3 November 1997) was an Indian Hindu philosopher, spiritual leader, guru, saint and the pontiff of Uttaradi Math, a math (monastery) dedicated to Dvaita philosophy, which has a large following in southern India. He served as the 41st pontiff of Madhvacharya Peetha - Uttaradi Math from 2 February 1948 – 3 November 1997. He had established Jayateertha Vidyapeetha in Bangalore in 1989.

== Jayateertha Vidyapeetha ==
Sri Satyapramoda Tirtha established Jayateertha Vidyapeetha in 1989, which presently holds more than 200 students and 15 teaching faculty members, in the subjects of Dvaita Vedanta, Vyakarana, Nyaya and Nyayasudha, a work on Dvaita Vedanta which has been published by this institution. It has in its custody vast collection of thousands of palm-leaf manuscripts.

== Notable works ==
Satyapramoda Tirtha composed six major works, most of them are commentaries, glosses and few independent works. His work Nyayasudha Mandanam is an answer to Anantakrishna Sastri's, (an advaita scholar) criticism of Jayatirtha's Nyaya Sudha and the general criticism of the post-Sankara Advaita thinkers of Dvaita.

- Nyayasudha Mandanam
- Yuktimallika Vyakhyana
- Vaishnava Sidhantarjavam
- Vijayendra Vijaya Vaibhavam
- Bhagavataha Nirdoshattva Lakshanaha
- Vayustuti Mandanam

== See also ==
- Dvaita Vedanta
- Works of Madhvacharya
- Uttaradi Matha

== Bibliography ==
- Sharma, B. N. Krishnamurti (2000). A History of the Dvaita School of Vedānta and Its Literature, Vol 1. 3rd Edition. Motilal Banarsidass (2008 Reprint). ISBN 978-8120815759.
- Rao, C. R. (1984). Srimat Uttaradi Mutt: Moola Maha Samsthana of Srimadjagadguru Madhvacharya.
- Potter, Karl H. (1995). Encyclopedia of Indian philosophies. 1, Bibliography : Section 1, Volumes 1-2. Motilal Banarsidass Publications. ISBN 978-8120803084.
- Dasgupta, Surendranath (1975). A History of Indian Philosophy, Volume 4. Motilal Banarsidass. ISBN 978-8120804159.
- Naqvī, Ṣādiq; Rao, V. Kishan (2005). A Thousand Laurels--Dr. Sadiq Naqvi: Studies on Medieval India with Special Reference to Deccan, Volume 2. Department of Ancient Indian History, Culture & Archaeology, Osmania University.
- Tripathi, Radhavallabh (2012). Ṣaṣṭyabdasaṃskr̥tam: India. Rashtriya Sanskrit Sansthan. ISBN 978-8124606292.
- Raghunathacharya, S. B (2002). Modern Sanskrit Literature: Tradition & Innovations. Sahitya Akademi. ISBN 978-8126014118.
