= Surendra Kumar Yadav (judge) =

Justice Surendra Kumar Yadav is currently the Deputy Lokayukta of Uttar Pradesh, and a former special CBI judge in the Demolition of the Babri Masjid case. The Babri Masjid was demolished in Ayodhya on 6 December 1992, after which proceedings went on under a lengthy filing process. As a judge in the special CBI court, he gave the verdict in the demolition of the Babri Masjid case on 30 September 2020.

== Life ==
Yadav was born on September 10, 1959, in Pakhanpur village of Jaunpur of Uttar Pradesh to Ram Krishna Yadav. After receiving the degree in Master of Law, he was selected for the Higher Judicial Service in 1990. He worked as Munsif, CJM, District Judge in many districts of Uttar Pradesh, he also gave the verdict in Babri Masjid demolition case as special CBI judge. He was appointed as the Deputy Lokayukta of Uttar Pradesh after his retirement in 2020.
