= Laknepalli =

Village in Telangana, India

Coordinates: 17°57′N 79°50′E

Laknepalli is a village panchayat in Narsampet mandal in Warangal district in the state of Telangana in India. Its PIN code is 506331.
