= Bheemadevarpalle =

Coordinates: 18°06′41″N 79°19′26″E

- Village
- Interactive map of Bheemadevarpalle
- Country: India
- State: Telangana
- District: Hanumakonda district

Languages
  - Official: Telugu
- Time zone: UTC+5:30 (IST)
- Nearest city: Hanumakonda
- Vidhan Sabha constituency: Husnabad
- Website: telangana.gov.in

Bheemadevarpalle is a mandal in hanumakonda district in the state of Telangana in India.
