= Ram Janmabhoomi Nyas =

Trust overseeing The Ram Mandir in Ayodhya

Ram Janmabhoomi Nyas is an organisation which was formed as a trust to promote and oversee the construction and maintenance of the temple to the Hindu deity Rama in Ayodhya, India, following the demolition of the Babri Masjid in 1992. The Nyas was formed by members of the Vishva Hindu Parishad, a Hindutva organisation. On 9 November 2019, the Supreme Court of India ruled that a separate trust should be constituted to build the Ram Mandir. Subsequently, on 5 February 2020, the Indian government established the Shri Ram Janmbhoomi Teerth Kshetra trust for this purpose, under the leadership of Nritya Gopal Das.

== Background ==
In Hindu mythology, the birthplace of the deity Rama, known as "Ram Janmabhoomi", is said to lie in the mythical city of Ayodhya and is regarded to as a holy site. This mythical location does not correspond to the actual city of Ayodhya in Uttar Pradesh, known as Saketa until the 5th century CE, which only emerged as a religious centre in the 18th century CE. Following the Mughal conquest of the region in 1528, Mughal general Mir Baqi built a mosque named the Babri Masjid in Ayodhya. According to hearsay as well as advocates of the Hindutva ideology, Baqi destroyed a pre-existing temple of Rama at the site; in reality, no such temple ever existed. The first recorded claim that the mosque stood on the site of Rama's birth was made in 1822. Citing this claim, the Nirmohi Akhara, a Hindu sect, laid claim to the mosque, resulting in inter-communal violence in the period of 1853 to 55. In 1949, an idol of Rama was surreptitiously placed inside the mosque by Hindu nationalists, and an attempt was made to convince devotees that it had appeared miraculously. In the 1980s, the Bharatiya Janata Party (BJP), alongside other Hindutva groups, organised a religious-political rally, named the Ram Rath Yatra, to build a temple to Rama at the site of the Babri Masjid, and the mosque was attacked and demolished on 6 December 1992 by members of the BJP and the Vishva Hindu Parishad.

== History ==
On 25 January 1993, the Ram Janmabhoomi Nyas (RJN) was founded as a trust by members of the Vishva Hindu Parishad to take charge of the site of demolished Babri Masjid and oversee the construction of the proposed Rama Temple. Ramchandra Paramhans was the first head of the Ram Janmabhoomi Nyas, succeeded upon his death in 2003 by Nritya Gopal Das. Its members have argued that the organisation was created so that the India government would not control the site and end up involving itself in the construction of the temple.

== 2010 Allahabad High Court verdict on the Ayodhya dispute ==
It has been suggested that a temple to Rama formerly existed at the same site as the Babri Masjid, an idea supported by a court-ordered report of the Archaeological Survey of India following archaeological excavations around the ruins of the mosque, though the existence of this temple and the conclusions of the report are disputed. The Allahabad High Court, based on the report by the Archeological Survey of India ruled that the disputed site should be split into three parts, with one-third going to the Muslim Sunni Waqf Board, another third to the Nirmohi Akhara and the rest to Ram Lalla Virajman with the right to sue and be sued as a juristic person. However, the Nyas claimed that it was the rightful party to take possession of the land and said it would appeal to the Supreme Court of India to seek possession of the entire site.

== 2019 Supreme Court verdict on Ayodhya dispute ==
The final hearing in the Supreme Court ended on 16 October 2019. The bench reserved the final judgment and granted three days to contesting parties to file written notes on 'moulding of relief' or narrowing down the issues on which the court is required to adjudicate.

The final judgement in the Supreme Court was officially declared on 9 November 2019. The Supreme Court dismisses the claim of Sunni Waqf Board and ordered that a trust to be made by the Government of India which be building the Temple. On 5 February 2020, the government announced the creation of the trust to be known as Shri Ram Janmabhoomi Teerth Kshetra. On 5 August 2020, Ram Mandir Bhoomi-poojan was performed in the presence of RSS Chief, Prime Minister and Chief Minister of Uttar Pradesh.

== See also ==
- Ram Mandir
- Ram Janmabhoomi
- Nritya Gopal Das
- Sangh Parivar
- Shri Ram Janmbhoomi Teerth Kshetra
- 2019 Supreme Court verdict on Ayodhya dispute
