= Ram Mandir =

Temple of the Hindu deity Rama in Ayodhya, India

- Rāma Mandira
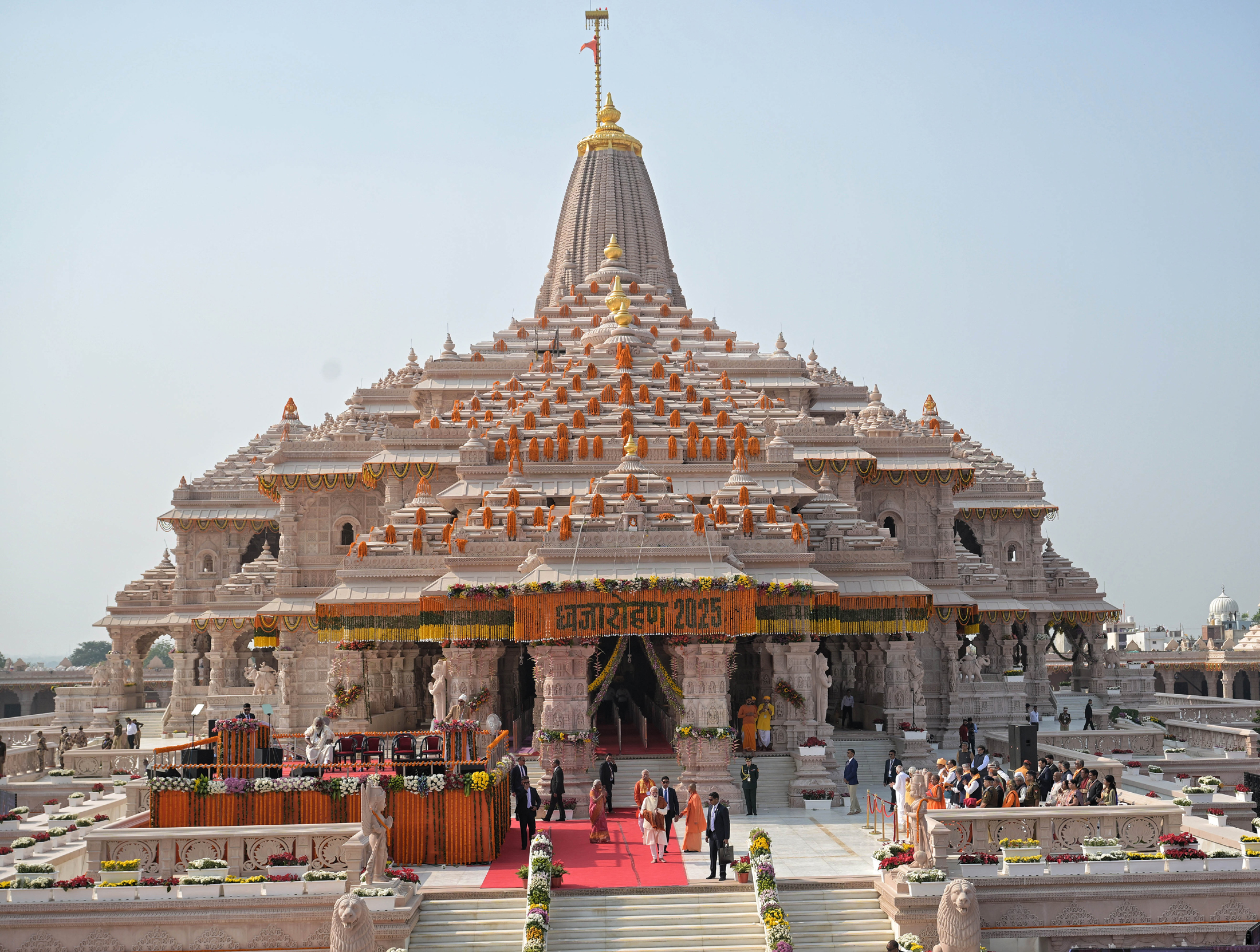

Religion
- Affiliation: Hinduism
- District: Ayodhya district
- Deity: Balak Ram (idol) (infant form of Rama)
- Governing body: Shri Ram Janmbhoomi Teerth Kshetra
- Status: Under construction (Note: Only the main temple construction has completed. The temple complex is still under construction)(consecrated 22 January 2024; 2 years ago)

Location
- Location: Ayodhya (Note: Not to be confused with Ayodhya (Ramayana))
- State: Uttar Pradesh
- Country: India
- Interactive map of Ram Mandir
- Coordinates: 26.7956°N 82.1943°E

Architecture
- Architect: Sompura family (Note: Chandrakant Sompura Nikhil Sompura and Ashish Sompura)
- Style: Maru-Gurjara architecture
- Groundbreaking: 5 August 2020; 6 years ago

Specifications
- Length: 110 metres (360 ft)
- Width: 72 metres (235 ft)
- Height (max): 49 metres (161 ft)
- Site area: 1.1 hectares (2.7 acres)

The Ram Mandir (ISO: Rāma Mandira, lit. 'Rama Temple'), is a Hindu temple complex in Ayodhya, Uttar Pradesh, India. It is one of the most visited Hindu temples in India, as many Hindus believe that it is located at the site of Ram Janmabhoomi, the mythical birthplace of Rama (a principal deity of Hinduism).

The temple sits on the former site of the Mughal-era Babri Masjid, demolished by a Hindu mob in 1992. The site of the temple had been the subject of a dispute between Hindus and Muslims since the mid-1800s. Around 1529, the Babri Masjid was constructed at the site, under the orders of a general of the Mughal ruler Babur. In the 1850s, the British erected a fence and Hindus were allowed to worship in the outer courtyard. In 1949, a group of Hindus placed a murti (transl. sacred Icon) of Rama inside the fence and claimed it was divine intervention. In 1980s, a campaign was launched by Vishwa Hindu Parishad (VHP) to claim the site for Hindus, which led to the structure being attacked and illegally demolished in 1992. In a 2019 judgement, the Supreme Court awarded the disputed site to Hindus for the construction of a temple, while Muslims were given land nearby in Dhannipur in Ayodhya to construct a mosque. The court referenced a report from the Archaeological Survey of India of a non-Islamic structure beneath the demolished Babri Masjid.

A bhūmi pūjana (transl. ground breaking ceremony) for the construction of the Ram Mandir was performed by Indian Prime Minister Narendra Modi in August 2020. The temple's construction was supervised by a trust, the Shri Ram Janmabhoomi Teerth Kshetra. On 22 January 2024, Modi performed the prāṇa pratiṣṭhā (transl. consecration) of the temple. The number of daily visitors to the temple is estimated around 100,000.

An independent trust, Shri Ram Janmbhoomi Teerth Kshetra, has been tasked with the management of the temple complex. There have been controversies over the alleged misuse of donations, sidelining of its major activists, and politicisation of the temple by the Bharatiya Janata Party. In 2026, the alleged theft of temple donations by some staffers led to investigations and changes in the trust leadership.

== Background ==
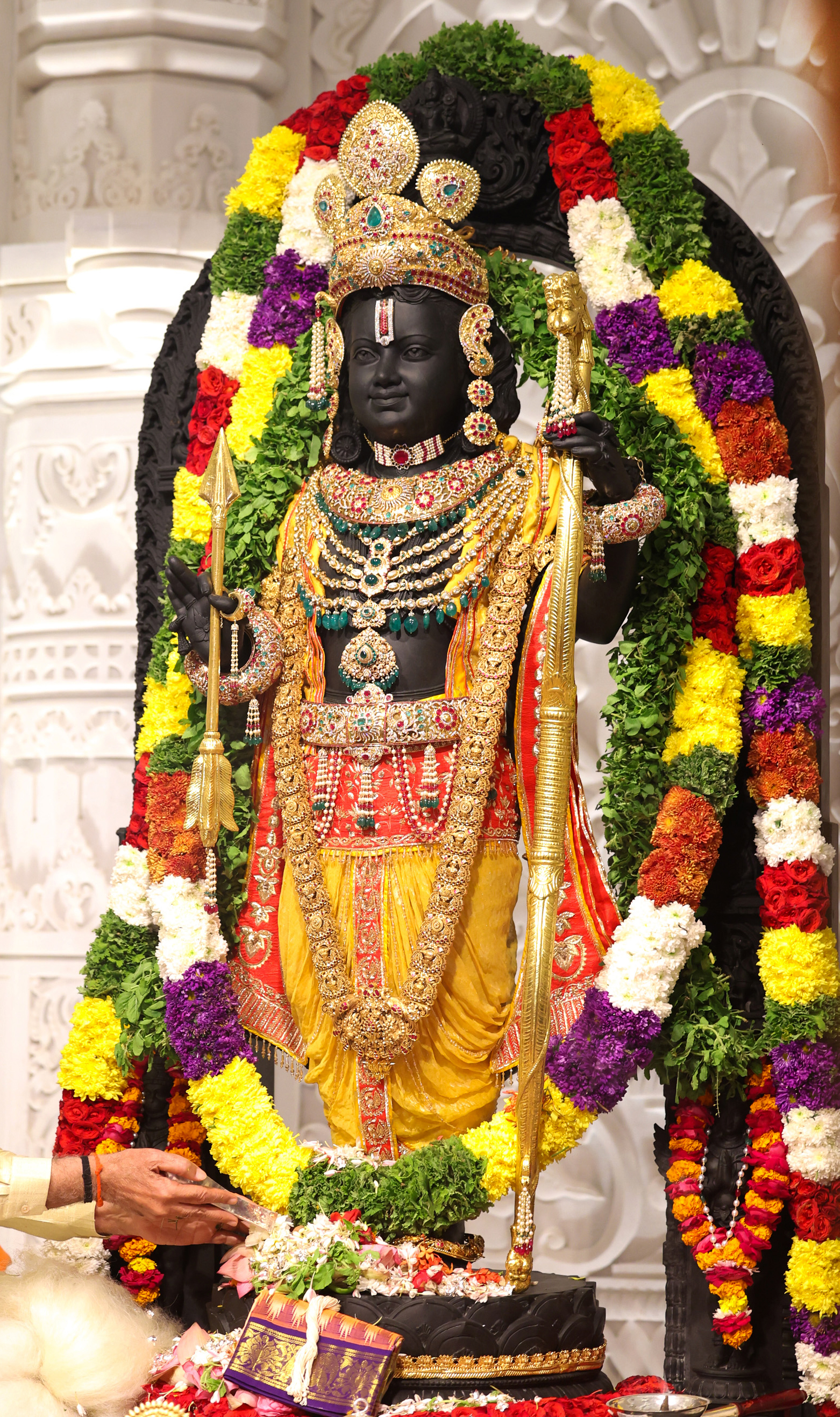
Ram Lalla, the five-year old form of Rama is the principal deity of the Ram Mandir.

Rama is a prominent Hindu deity who is regarded as a Pūrṇāvatāra (lit. 'complete avatar') of the God Vishnu. (Note: The avatars of Vishnu are of two types. Pūrṇā and Amśa (lit. 'A part'). In the former, Vishnu himself was supposed to have descended on Earth from his abode, while in the latter, an equivalent part (or a copy) of him was sent to take the incarnation. Nrisimha, Rama and Krishna are said to be the Purnavataras of Vishnu.) Some Hindus view Rama as Para Brahman (lit. 'The ultimate Brahman'). Rama's story is told in numerous Hindu texts, including the Ramayana, which exists in many versions. As Rama is said to have possessed sixteen ideal qualities, Hindus view Rama as Puruṣottama (lit. 'Ideal man'), Vigrahavān dharmaḥ (lit. 'Embodiment of Dharma'), and Ādi Puruṣa (lit. 'First man' or 'Primordial being'). (Note: As per Valmiki Ramayana, Rama had sixteen qualities. Rama was said to be 1.guṇavān, 2.vīryavān, 3.dharmajñaḥ, 4.kṛtajñaḥ, 5.satyavākyaḥ, 6.dṛḍhavrataḥ, 7.cāritraḥ, 8.sarvabhūteṣu hitaḥ, 9.vidvān, 10.samarthaḥ, 11. priyadarśanaḥ, 12.ātmavān, 13.jitakrodhaḥ, 14.dyutimān, 15. anasūyakaḥ, and 16.jātaroṣasya saṃyuge devāśca bibhyati.)

=== Birthplace of Rama ===
According to the Hindu epic Ramayana, Rama was born in the mythical Ayodhya city on the banks of the Sarayu river. The histories of the contemporary city of Ayodhya and the mythological city of the same name are a matter of debate among scholars. Historian Hans Bakker states that the present-day Ayodhya is distinct from the mythical city, while archaeologist B. B. Lal argues that the archaeological remains at the present-day city are related to the Ayodhya described in the Ramayaṇa. Many historians state that the present-day Ayodhya was likely named "Saketa" until it was renamed in the fifth century CE by a king of the Gupta Empire, though others argue that there is no historical evidence of such a renaming, and state that ancient texts, such as poet Kalidasa's Raghuvaṃśa, use the names Sāketa and Ayodhya interchangeably, suggesting the names refer to a single city.

=== Ram Lalla ===
The presiding deity of the temple is the infant form of Rama. This form was referred to as Ram Lalla (lit. 'Child Rama') by Tulsidas. However, the idol of Rama that was placed in 1949 referred to as Ram Lalla Virajman (lit. 'Installed Child Rama') by local Hindus. Ram Lalla was a litigant in the court case over the disputed site in 1989, being considered a "juristic person" by the law. He was represented by Triloki Nath Pandey, a senior VHP leader who was considered Ram Lalla's closest 'human' friend. As a new idol of the deity got installed in the sanctum sanctorum as the Mūlavirāt mūrti (lit. The main presiding deity), (Note: The presiding deity is also referred by other names such as Acala mūrti (lit. Immovable idol), Dhṛva mūrti(lit. Fixed idol) and Mūlavigraha (lit. The main idol).) the Mandir Trust has informed that the Ram Lalla Virajman idol of 1949 shall henceforth be used as Utsava mūrti (lit. idol for festivals).

== History ==
The site is the former location of the Babri Masjid, which was built in the 16th century. The mosque was attacked and demolished in 1992. In 2019, the Supreme Court of India delivered the verdict to give the disputed land to Hindus for the construction of a temple, while Muslims would be given land elsewhere to construct a mosque.

=== Medieval ===
Around 1529, a commander of the Mughal Empire, Mir Baqi, constructed the Babri Masjid mosque, under the order of Babur. The site chosen for the mosque is identified by many Hindus as Ram Janmabhoomi, the mythical birthplace of Rama. The earliest record of the mosque may be traced back to 1767, in the Latin book Descriptio Indiae, authored by the Jesuit missionary Joseph Tiefenthaler. According to him, the local population believed that the mosque was constructed by destroying the Ramkot temple, believed to be the fortress of Rama in Ayodhya, and the Bedi, where the birthplace of Rama is situated.

=== Modern ===
==== Disputed location ====
The first instance of religious violence was documented in 1853. In December 1858, the British administration created a platform for conducting rituals outside the contested site. In 1859, the British erected a fence to separate the places of worship, allowing the inner court to be used by Muslims and the outer court by Hindus to conduct puja (rituals).

A group of Hindus installed Murtis (transl. sacred idols) of Rama and Sita inside the Babri Masjid fenced area on the night of 22–23 December 1949 and then claimed it was divine intervention.. By 1950, the state took control of the mosque under Section 145 CrPC and allowed Hindus, not Muslims, to perform their worship at the site.

In the 1980s, the Vishwa Hindu Parishad (VHP), belonging to the Hindu nationalist family, Sangh Parivar, launched a new movement to reclaim the site for Hindus and to erect a temple dedicated to the infant Rama (Ram Lalla) at this spot. The VHP began to collect funds and bricks with "Jai Shri Ram" written on them. Later, the government under Prime Minister Rajiv Gandhi gave the VHP permission for Shilanyas (transl. the foundation stone ceremony) to proceed, with the then Home Minister, Buta Singh, formally conveying the permission to the VHP leader, Ashok Singhal. Initially, the Government of India and the Government of Uttar Pradesh had agreed that the shilanyas would be conducted outside of the disputed site. However, on 9 November 1989, a group of VHP leaders and Sadhus laid the foundation stone by digging a 200-litre (7-cubic-foot) pit adjacent to the disputed land. The singhdwar (transl. main entrance) of the sanctum sanctorum was constructed there. The VHP then laid the foundations of a temple on the land adjacent to the disputed mosque.

==== Demolition of the Babri Masjid ====
On 6 December 1992, the VHP and the Bharatiya Janata Party organised a rally at the site involving 150,000 volunteers, known as karsevaks. The rally turned violent, the crowd overwhelmed the security forces and tore down the mosque.

The demolition of the mosque resulted in several months of inter-communal violence between India's Hindu and Muslim communities, causing the death of an estimated 2,000 people in Bombay (now Mumbai) as a direct consequence, and triggering riots all over the Indian subcontinent. A day after the demolition of the mosque, on 7 December 1992, The New York Times reported that over 30 Hindu temples across Pakistan were attacked, some set on fire, and one was demolished. Hindu temples in Bangladesh were also attacked.

On 5 July 2005, five terrorists attacked the makeshift Ram temple at the site of the destroyed Babri Masjid in Ayodhya. All five were shot dead in the ensuing encounter with the Central Reserve Police Force (CRPF), while one civilian died in the grenade attack that the attackers launched to breach the cordoned wall. The CRPF suffered three casualties, two of whom were seriously injured with multiple gunshot wounds.

==== ASI excavations ====
Reports on two archaeological excavations in 1978 and 2003 conducted by the ASI claimed to have found evidence indicating that a temple existed on the site. The claims were heavily disputed by critics as contradictory and unreliable. Archaeologist K. K. Muhammed maintained that remains of a Hindu temple were found in 1978, and accused several historians of averting a settlement for the dispute.

==== Court rulings ====
Over the years, various title and legal disputes took place, such as the passage of the Acquisition of Certain Areas at Ayodhya Act in 1993. In 2010, the Allahabad High Court ruled that the 1.12 hectares (2.77 acres) of disputed land be divided into three parts, one going to the Ram Lalla or Infant Rama, represented by the Hindu Mahasabha for the construction of the Ram temple, one going to the Muslim Sunni Waqf Board, and one going to Hindu religious denomination Nirmohi Akhara. All three parties involved appealed against the division of disputed land to the Supreme Court.

In the Supreme Court's verdict on the Ayodhya dispute in 2019, it was decided that the disputed land would be handed over to a trust formed by the Government of India for the construction of a Ram temple.

The court referenced the 2003 report from the ASI, as evidence suggesting the presence of a structure beneath the demolished Babri Masjid, that was found to be non-Islamic. The Supreme Court, in its landmark judgement concluded that the underlying structure beneath the mosque was not an Islamic structure, and also concluded that no evidence was found that a non-Islamic structure was specifically demolished for the construction of the Babri Masjid. Another salient aspect in the apex court's judgement is on the question on the claim of Hindus that disputed structure as the birthplace of Rama. The court observed that the Hindu claim is 'undisputed' and opined that there is clear evidence that Hindus believed that site to be Rama's birthplace.

==== Terror attack ====
On 5 July 2005, five Lashkar-e-Taiba's terrorists attacked the makeshift Ram temple at the site of destroyed Babri Masjid in Ayodhya, India. All five were shot dead in the ensuing gunfight with the Central Reserve Police Force (CRPF), while one civilian died in the grenade attack that the attackers launched in order to breach the cordoned wall. The CRPF suffered three casualties, two of whom were seriously injured with multiple gunshot wounds.

==== Trust formation and start of construction ====
The trust was eventually formed under the name of the Shri Ram Janmabhoomi Teerth Kshetra. On 5 February 2020, it was announced in the Parliament of India that the government under Prime Minister Narendra Modi had accepted a plan to construct the temple. Two days later, on 7 February, 2.0 hectares (5 acres) of land was allocated for a new mosque to be built 22 km (14 mi) away from Ayodhya city in Dhannipur village.

== Architecture ==
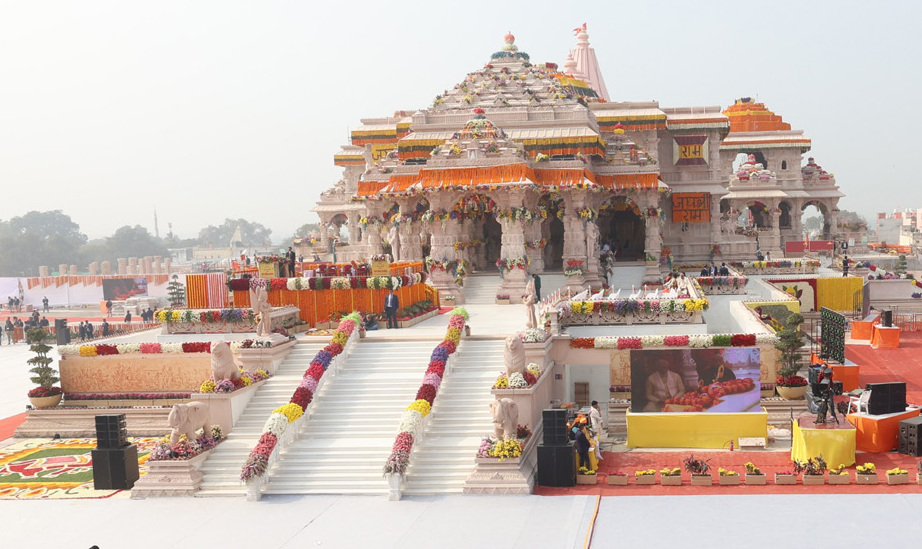
Ram Mandir on January 22, 2024.

The original design for Ram Mandir was devised in 1988 by the Sompura family of Ahmedabad. The Sompuras have contributed to the design of over 100 temples worldwide for at least 15 generations, including the Somnath temple. The chief architect of the temple was Chandrakant Sompura, assisted by his two sons, Nikhil Sompura and Ashish Sompura, who are also architects.

A new design, with some changes from the original, was prepared by the Sompuras in 2020, per the Hindu texts, the Vastu shastra and the Shilpa shastras. The temple will be 250 feet (76 m) wide, 380 feet (120 m) long and 161 feet (49 m) high. Upon completion, the temple complex became the world's third largest Hindu temple. It is designed in the Maru-Gurjara architecture of Nagara style, a type of Hindu temple architecture found primarily in northern India. A model of the proposed temple was showcased during the Prayag Kumbh Mela in 2019.

The temple's main structure has been built on a raised platform with three storeys. It has five mandapas in the middle of the garbhagriha (sanctum sanctorum) and on the entrance passage. The Shri Ram Darbar, located on the first floor, comprises five halls – Nritya Mandap, Rang Mandap, Sabha Mandap, Prarthana Mandap, and Kirtan Mandap. In Nagara style, the mandapas are decorated with shikharas. Adorned with deity statues, the temple includes dedicated mandirs for Surya, Bhagwati, Ganesh, and Shiv at the corners. Annapurna and Hanuman temples are on the northern and southern arms. The foundation features a 14-metre (46 ft)-thick roller-compacted concrete layer resembling artificial rock, with a 21-foot (6.4 m) granite plinth for moisture protection, avoiding iron use. Accessibility is ensured with ramps, lifts, and facilities for the elderly and differently-abled. A pilgrims facility centre for 25,000 people offers medical and locker services. Environmental focus preserves 70% of the 70-acre (28 ha) area as green space, emphasising water conservation.

The temple has a total of 366 columns. The columns have 16 idols each to include the incarnations of Shiva, the 10 Dashavataras, the Chausath Yoginis, and the 12 incarnations of the goddess Saraswati. The width of the stairs are 16 feet (4.9 m). Per scriptures dedicated to the design of temples dedicated to Vishnu, the sanctum sanctorum is octagonal in shape. According to the temple committee, the site has a capability to handle 70,000 visitors. Larsen & Toubro offered to oversee the design and construction of the temple free of cost, and became the contractor of the project. Girish Sahasrabhojanee was the design and construction manager. The Central Building Research Institute, National Geophysical Research Institute and the Bombay, Guwahati and Madras IITs have assisted in areas such as soil testing, concrete supply and design.

The construction work has been accomplished with 600,000 cubic feet (17,000 m^{3}) of sandstone from Baansi in Rajasthan. No iron and steel has been used in the construction of the temple, and the fusing of the stone blocks has required ten thousand copper plates. In a culturally significant move, Thailand also symbolically contributed to the inauguration of the Ram Mandir, by sending soil to the Ram Janmabhoomi, building on their prior gesture of sending water from two rivers in Thailand to honour the temple.

According to the temple trust, the final blueprint of Ram Mandir included temples dedicated to Surya, Ganesha, Shiva, Durga, Vishnu and Brahma in the temple grounds.

== Fundraising ==
The Ram Mandir was built with funds gained through international fundraising drives, involving nearly two million volunteers. Ramnath Kovind was the first to contribute, donating ₹500,000 on 14 January 2021, during his tenure as the president of India. Over 127 million donations amounting to approximately ₹50 billion were received by the temple. Some media outlets in India claimed that the construction of the Ram mandir was one of the world's biggest crowd funded projects. Fundraising by the Mandir trust has ended on 27 February 2021.

The public was warned of instances in which online scammers posed as fundraisers. The temple has also attracted a number of controversies due to alleged misuse of donation, sidelining of its major activists, and politicisation of the temple by the Bharatiya Janata Party.

== Construction ==
The Shri Ram Janmbhoomi Teerth Kshetra trust began the first phase of construction of the Ram Mandir in March 2020. The COVID-19 pandemic lockdown in India caused a temporary suspension of the construction. On 25 March 2020, Ram's idol was moved to a temporary location in the presence of the Chief Minister of Uttar Pradesh, Yogi Adityanath. In preparation for the temple's construction, the Vishva Hindu Parishad (VHP) organised a 'Vijay Mahamantra Jaap Anushthan', in which individuals would gather at different places to chant the 'Vijay Mahamantra' – Shri Ram, Jai Ram, Jai Jai Ram, on 6 April 2020. This was said to ensure "victory over hurdles" in constructing the temple.

It was officially announced by Champat Rai, the General Secretary of the Sri Ram Janmbhoomi Kshetra Trust, that 22 January 2024 would be the scheduled date for the installation of the Ram Lalla idol in the garbhagriha (sanctum sanctorum). On 25 October 2023, a formal invitation was extended to Prime Minister Narendra Modi to attend the ceremony.

In 2020, the national spokesperson of the Nirmohi Akhara, Mahant Sitaram Das, criticised the BJP's decision to have the temple foundation begun by Narendra Modi and said that the work of building the temple should be done only by the religious priests. A number of Hindutva proponents, including online social media influencers, raised objections over the temple's construction with regards to its design and involvement of the Muslims, claiming that they found Islamic motifs in the Ram Mandir. Champat Rai, the general secretary of the Shri Ram Janmabhoomi Teerth Kshetra trust, responded to these concerns by saying that temple was being sculpted by experts, and there could be no question about their religion. The vice-president of the Hindu Mahasabha, Pandit Ashok Sharma, said that the BJP "got the entire thing politicised."

A number of opposition parties, as well as BJP members themselves, have criticised the BJP for using the temple to for gain political mileage. The President of the Congress, Mallikarjun Kharge, had questioned the authority of Home Minister Amit Shah, after he declared the opening date of the temple. The BJP leader Subramanian Swamy questioned Prime Minister Narendra Modi's involvement in Ram Mandir's inauguration. The Congress MP Shashi Tharoor has criticised the Indian media for diverting attention from critical governance issues by overly focusing on the temple.

=== Bhumi Pujan ceremony ===
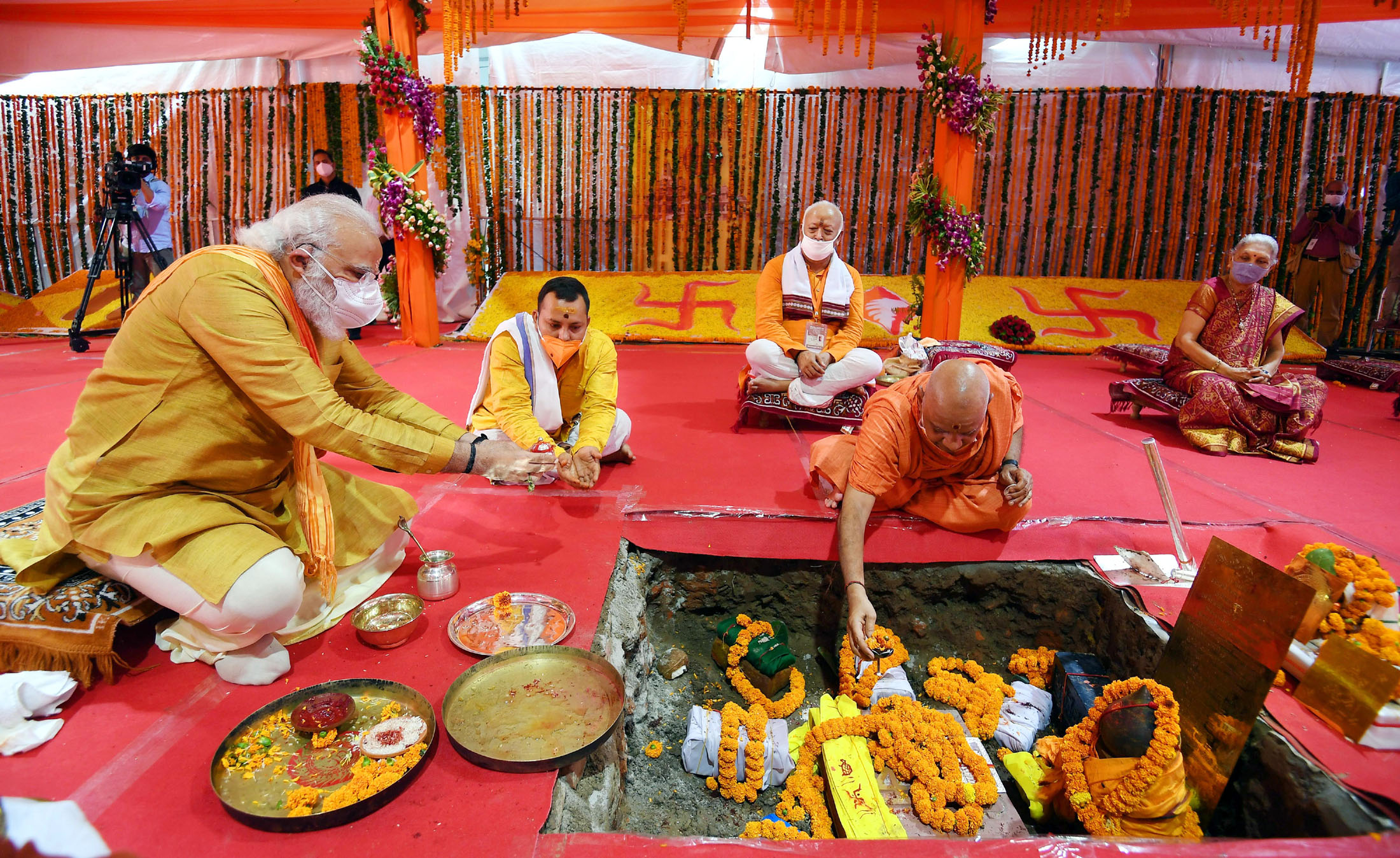
Prime Minister Narendra Modi performing Bhumi Pujan or the groundbreaking ceremony for the Ram Mandir. Also visible are the chief of the Rashtriya Swayamsevak Sangh (RSS), Mohan Bhagwat, and the Governor of Uttar Pradesh, Anandiben Patel.

On the occasion of Bhumi Pujan, the Ram Lalla's dress was stitched by tailors Bhagwat Prasad and Shankar Lal, a fourth generation tailor to Rama's idol.

The temple construction officially started again after a Bhumi-Pujan (transl. ground breaking ceremony) on 5 August 2020. The three-day long Vedic ritual was held ahead of the groundbreaking ceremony, which revolved around the installation of a 40 kg (88 pounds) silver brick as the foundation stone by Prime Minister Narendra Modi. On the day before on 4 August, the Ramarchan Puja (transl. Puja of Rama's feet) was performed, in order to ritually invite all the major deities into the temple.

On the occasion of the Bhoomi Poojan, soil and holy water were collected from several religious places across India, such as the Triveni Sangam of the rivers Ganga, Yamuna, and Saraswati at Prayagraj, the head of the Kaveri River at Talakaveri in Karnataka, and the Kamakhya Temple in Assam. Soil was also sent from various Hindu temples, gurudwaras and Jain temples across the nation, as well as from the four pilgrimage sites in Char Dham, to bless the temple.

Before the ceremony, Prime Minister Narendra Modi sought Hanuman's blessing by praying at the Hanuman Garhi Temple in Ayodhya. The Chief Minister of Uttar Pradesh, Yogi Adityanath, Chief of Rashtriya Swayamsevak Sangh, Mohan Bhagwat, Chief of the Ram Janmabhoomi Nyas and Chief of the Shri Ram Janmabhoomi Teerth Kshetra, Nritya Gopal Das and Narendra Modi gave speeches.

Some priests and religious leaders, such as Swaroopanand Saraswati, complained that 5 August was not a ritually auspicious date and that the ceremony did not follow proper ritual procedures. They also claimed that the function did not include a havan. Writer and activist Arundhati Roy, a noted critic of PM Modi, pointed out that the chosen date marked one year since the revocation of the special status of Jammu and Kashmir. The Pakistan Foreign Office issued a statement criticising India for commencing for constructing a temple on the former site of the destroyed Babri Masjid.

In 2017, the Hindu Mahasabha accused the BJP, Bajrang Dal and other Sangh Parivar organisations of hijacking the Ram Mandir despite having no involvement in its long battle. In 2020, Pramod Joshi, the national spokesperson of the Hindu Mahasabha, said that the real credit of Ram Mandir belongs to Hindu Mahasabha, and that the Hindu Mahasabha should have performed the bhumi pujan, but instead had been kept away. He added that the committee for the temple was formed at the BJP's central office and the Hindu Mahasabha was sidelined.

=== 2021–present ===
The temple trust decided to launch a nationwide "mass contact and contribution campaign" aimed at reaching 55–600 million people. Voluntary donations of ₹1 (1.1¢ US) and higher were accepted. On 1 January 2021, former President Ram Nath Kovind made the first contribution towards the construction of the Ram Mandir by donating more than ₹5 lakh (US$5,300). Several leaders and notable personalities across the nation followed this. By April 2021, around ₹5,000 crore (US$530 million) was collected from donations across India. Nearly 150,000 VHP activists participated in collecting donations. The temple trust also received donations from the members of the Muslim and Christian communities.

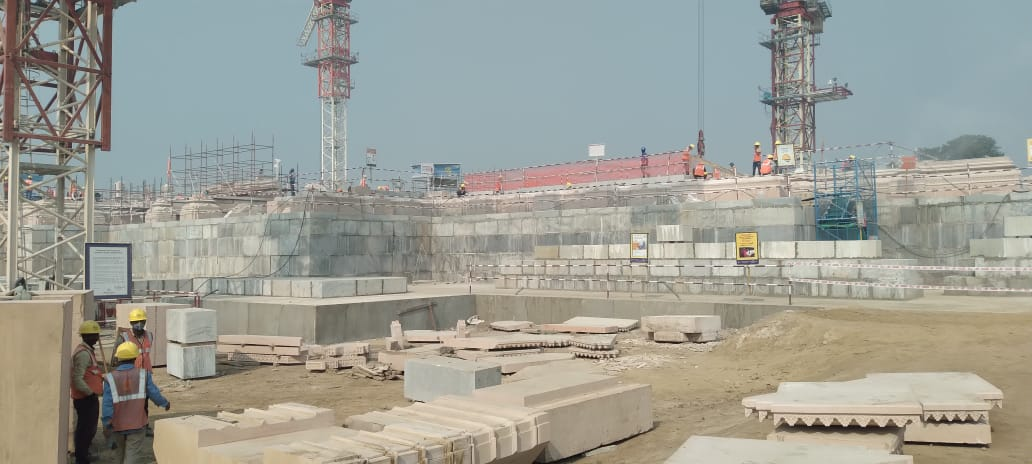
View of the Ram Mandir under construction in 2022

In August 2021, a viewing location was created for the public to observe the construction works in the temple site. Following the groundbreaking ceremony, up to 40 feet (12 m) of debris were removed and the remaining earth compacted. The foundation was made using roller-compacted concrete. A total of 47–48 layers, with each layer 1-foot (0.30 m) high, were completed by mid-September 2021. Due to electricity supply issues in Mirzapur, the cutting of the sandstone was slowed down. In early 2022, a video was released by the temple trust, showing the planned construction of the temple in 3D along with other related information.

In January 2023, two 60-million-year-old Shaligram rocks, 26 tonnes and 14 tonnes respectively, were sent from the Gandaki River in Nepal. These rocks were used to carve the idol of Ram Lalla in the sanctum sanctorum. In August 2023, according to the Shri Ram Janmabhoomi Teerth Kshetra Trust, 70% of the groundwork was completed and 40% of the roof work was completed. In December 2023, the entire base, along with the six smaller temples that surround the main temple, which consists of the sanctum sanctorum, were almost completed. For its consecration, only the ground floor was opened.

== Consecration ==
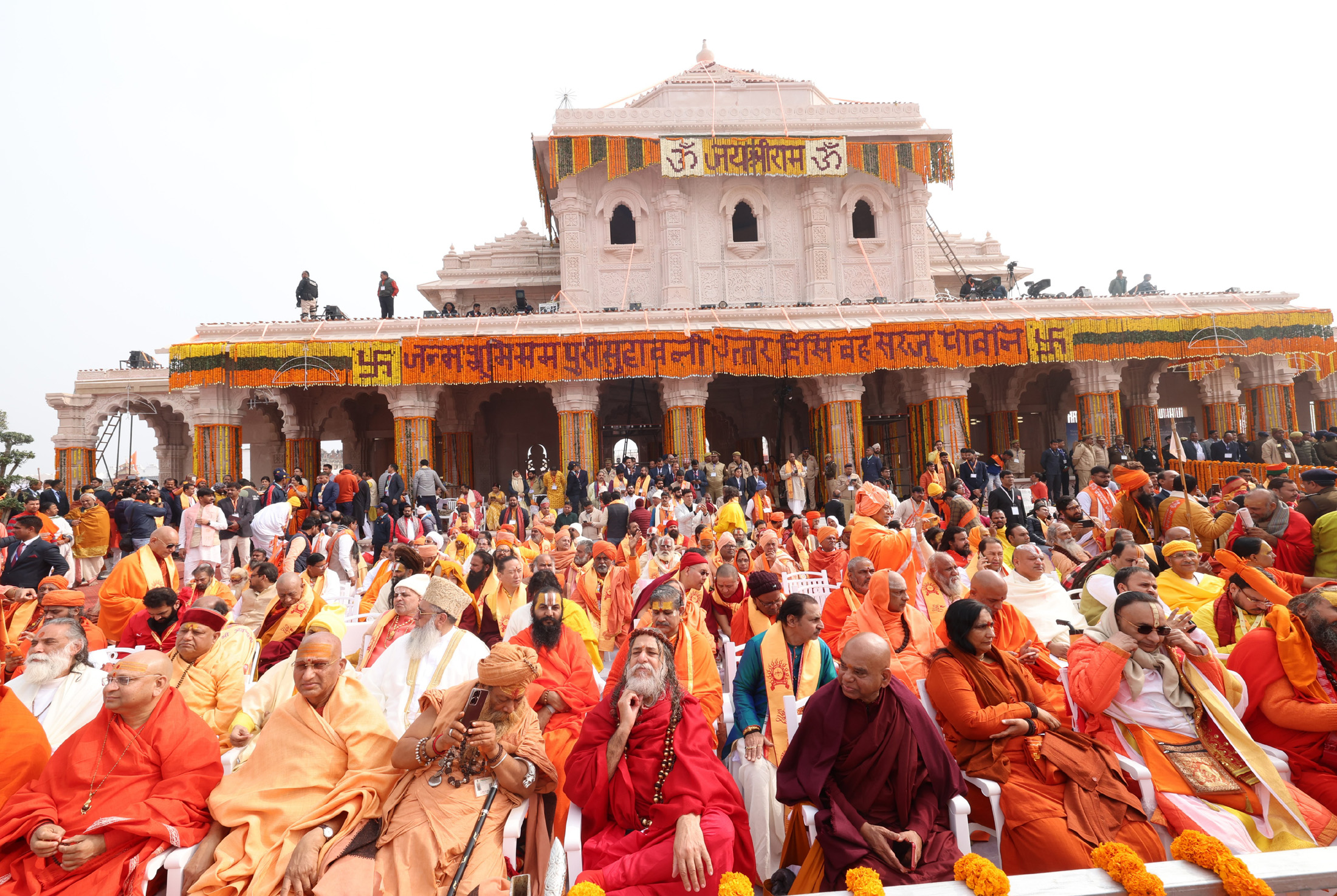
Devotees and visitors celebrating the Prana Pratishtha ceremony outside the temple on 22 January 2024

On 22 June 2023, Temple Construction Committee chairman Nripendra Misra announced that the ground floor of the three-story temple was complete and was expected to open for the devotees in January 2024. The Ram Mandir Teerth Kshetra Trust announced that Hindu astrologers had selected 22 January 2024 as the auspicious date for the consecration ceremony.

In preparation for the Prana Pratishtha (consecration) ceremony, the Government of Uttar Pradesh earmarked ₹100 crore (US$11 million) for 'Ramotsav', a series of religious events that spanned 826 local bodies across Uttar Pradesh along with the Ram Paduka Yatra, commencing in December 2023 and culminating in the grand celebrations from Makar Sankranti on 16 January 2024, and lasting until the inauguration of the Ram Mandir on 22 January. The yatra followed the Ram Van Gaman Path, retracing Rama's 14-year exile from Ayodhya. The trust, the Government of Uttar Pradesh, and Ayodhya city administrators carried out extensive preparations to accommodate the influx of devotees and invited guests from all over the world. Strict security measures were enacted in and around the temple premises. The Government of Uttar Pradesh announced public holiday to mark the occasion. The Government of India and some state governments declared a half day holiday.

Prime Minister Narendra Modi was invited to perform the Prana Pratishtha of the newly made idol in the sanctum sanctorum. In preparation, he undertook an 11-day fast, consuming only coconut water and fruit and sleeping on the ground at night. He performed the consecration ceremony on 22 January 2024 from 12:15 PM to 12:45PM IST. Prime Minister Modi urged every Indian to light up diyas to mark the occasion and celebrate it like Diwali.

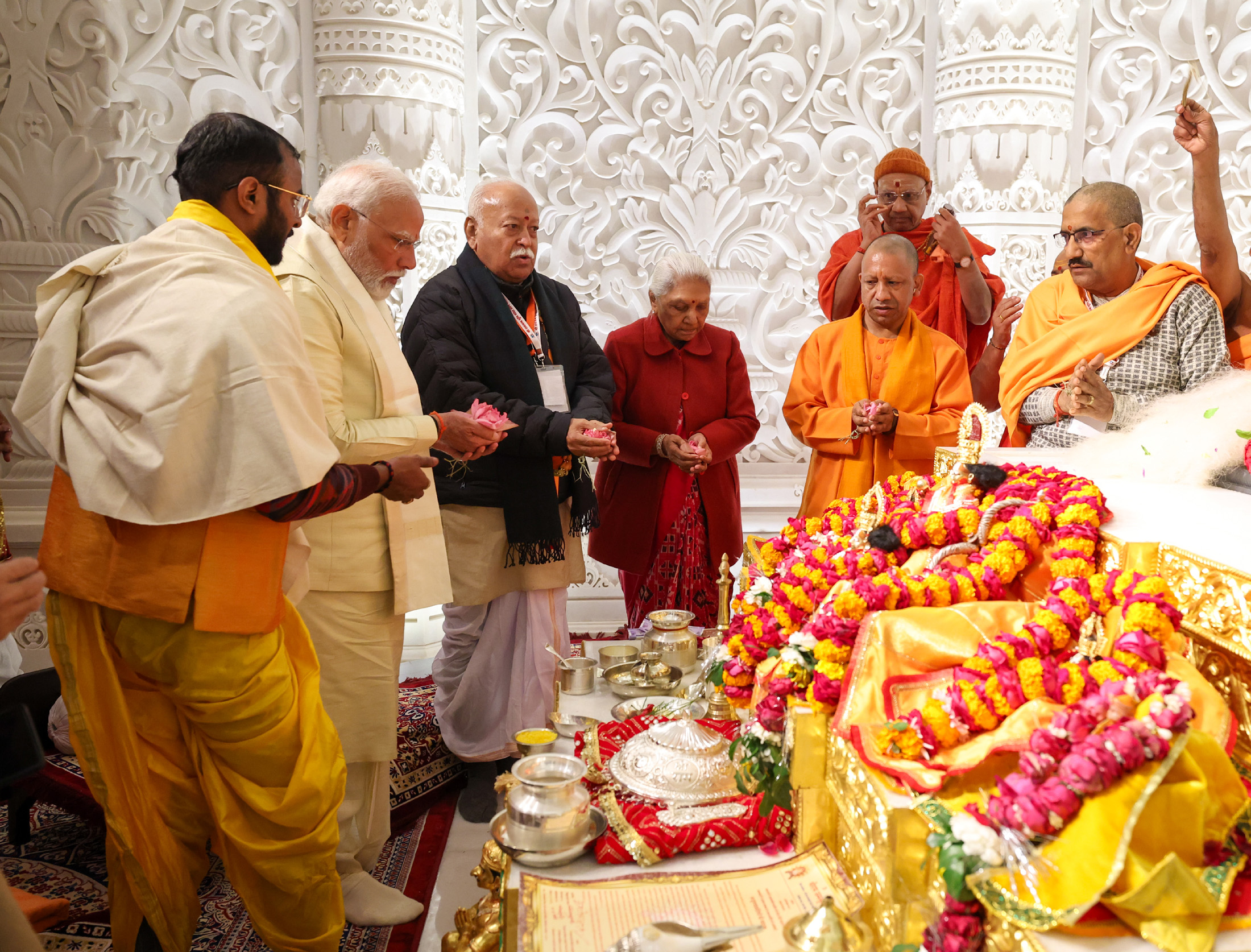
Prime Minister Modi during Prana Pratishtha

The guests were addressed by Chief Minister Yogi Adityanath, RSS Chief Mohan Bhagwat and Prime Minister Modi. Modi also spoke of Rama as a symbol of righteousness and unity.

While Yogi Adityanath's address was steeped in religious fervor, celebrating the Ram Mandir as a victory for faith and perseverance. He praised the devotion of millions who contributed to the temple's construction and acknowledged the divine blessings that guided the process.

Mohan Bhagwat spoke of the Ram Mandir as a symbol of national pride, marking the revival of India's cultural heritage. He emphasised the importance of preserving ancient traditions and values in a rapidly modernising world.

The guest list also included prominent industrialists, scientists, actors, army officers, spiritual leaders and Padma awardees. The event was organised by Shri Ram Janmbhoomi Teerth Kshetra. On the day it opened, the temple received around half a million visitors, and after a month, the number of daily visitors was reported to be between 100,000 and 150,000.

None of the four Shankaracharyas of the four cardinal mathas, citing various reasons, took part in the ceremony. Sringeri Sharada Peetham issued a denial that its head seer Bharathi Tirtha had expressed some displeasure and called the ceremony a "matter of joy" for all Hindu believers. Tirtha blessed the event and sent an administrative officer, Gowrishankar as representative of the matha. The head seer of Govardhan Math, Nischalananda Saraswati said that the ceremony deviated from established tradition. The head seer of Jyotir Math, Swami Avimukteshwaranand has stated that the ceremony is against Hindu sastras as the temple is still under construction. The head seer of the Dwarka Sharada Peetham, Swami Sadanand Saraswati welcomed the ceremony as a "long-awaited moment". He said that none of the four Shankaracharyas were angry and that it was not appropriate for them to attend given, the massive crowd expected.

On 25 November 2025, the temple construction was formally completed with an event called Ram Mandir Dhwajarohan marked by hoisting of the saffron flag, Dharma Dhwaja, atop the temple by PM Modi. The ceremony took place on the auspicious day of Vivah Panchami, with the flag, featuring the Sun, ‘Om’, and the Kovidara tree. The dignitaries at the event included RSS chief Mohan Bhagwat, Governor Anandiben Patel, and Chief Minister Yogi Adityanath.

== Shri Rama Yantra ==
President Droupadi Murmu performing darshan and arti during the Shri Ram Yantra Sthapana ceremony at the Ram Mandir.

The Śrīrāma Yantra (Sanskrit: श्रीराम यन्त्र), a 3 × 3 ft, 150 kg 24-carat gold-plated copper yantra, was installed on the second floor of the Temple on 19 March 2026 in the presence of the President of India, Droupadi Murmu during the Abhijit muhurta. (Note: In the Hindu calendar, the Abhijit Muhurta is a daily, highly auspicious 48-minute window centered around local solar noon. It is considered a highly auspicious period and favorable for starting important activities when no other muhurta is available.) The yantra was a gift to the temple by the Vijayendra Saraswati, the 70th Shankaracharya of the Kanchi Kamakoti Peetham, on behalf of the Peetham. It was modelled after the Ramayantra at the Peetham and it was engraved with Vedic and Beeja mantras. The yantra began its journey to Ayodhya on a Ratha yatra from Tirupati on 27 October 2024, inaugurated by Sri Vijayendra Saraswati. (Note: A yantra is a sacred geometric diagram used in Hinduism and related spiritual traditions as a tool for meditation, worship, and focusing the mind on a particular deity, energy, or spiritual principle.)

== Rama Darbar ==
Idols of the Rama Darbar enshrined at the Ram Mandir.

The Rāma Darbāra Prāṇa Pratiṣṭhā ceremony was held on 5 June 2025 at the temple, marking a significant ritual milestone in the ongoing completion of the temple complex and was referred to as the second ‘Pran Pratishtha’ ceremony. The installation took place on the first floor of the temple and followed the earlier consecration of Ram Lalla in January 2024. The ceremony involved the consecration of the Rāma Darbāra (lit. 'Rama's court'), depicting Lord Rama in his royal form, known as Raja Rāma, along with Goddess Sita, Lakshmana, and Hanuman. Rama Darbar is also referred to by South Indian Hindus as Rāma Pattābhiṣēkam. The rituals were performed through Vedic chants, havan, and traditional Agamic procedures conducted by priests under the supervision of the Shri Ram Janmabhoomi Teerth Kshetra Trust. Before this, the Ram Raja Temple at Orchha, Madhya Pradesh, was the only temple in India, where Rama was worshiped in his royal form.

Uttar Pradesh Chief Minister Yogi Adityanath attended the ceremony as the chief guest and participated in key rituals. The event was held during an auspicious muhurta and was attended by saints, temple trust members, and invited dignitaries. The ceremony is part of the phased development of the Ram Mandir complex, which includes multiple shrines dedicated to various deities within the temple premises.

== Misappropriation of donations ==
In 2015, the Hindu Mahasabha, among the leading organisation involved in the Ram Mandir issue, alleged the BJP-affiliate Vishwa Hindu Parishad (VHP) of carrying out donation scam of over ₹1,400 crore (US$150 million) over the construction of the temple. The VHP denied this allegation.

In 2019, the national spokesperson of the Nirmohi Akhara, Mahant Sitaram Das, accused the VHP of carrying out a ₹1,400 crore (US$150 million) scam over the temple. Political leaders from opposition parties have also questioned the methods of fund collection.

In June 2026, there were reports of alleged misappropriation of donations, especially mishandling of the daily cash collection from devotees' donations at the Ram Temple. An independent trust, Shri Ram Janmabhoomi Teerth Kshetra Trust manages the shrine and faced questions over the collection and audit of daily cash and valuable jewellery donations by the devotees. Uttar Pradesh Chief Minister Yogi Adityanath announced a Special Investigation Team (SIT) to probe the alleged embezzlement of temple donations. After an interim report by SIT, police registered a case of alleged embezzlement against eight people, all of whom were arrested. The preliminary report by the SIT also noted lapses and inadequate supervision by senior trust officials in the handling of cash donations. Champat Rai, the general secretary of the Shri Ram Janmabhoomi Teerth Kshetra Trust, resigned after his driver, Tinnu Yadav, was arrested on charges of theft and embezzlement of daily cash donations. Another trustee, Anil Mishra, also submitted his resignation, following reported links to individuals arrested for the thefts.

Several political leaders from opposition parties, as well as the BJP, requested an investigation into the mismanagement by the trust committee. There were calls for further administrative reforms and regular audits of donations. In July 2026, the trust authorities announced a leadership overhaul in response to allegations of theft of donations. The general secretary was replaced with an interim official, Krishna Mohan, a retired Indian Forest Service (IFS) officer, who said his priority was to prevent any future misappropriation of donations.

== Impact and associated activities ==
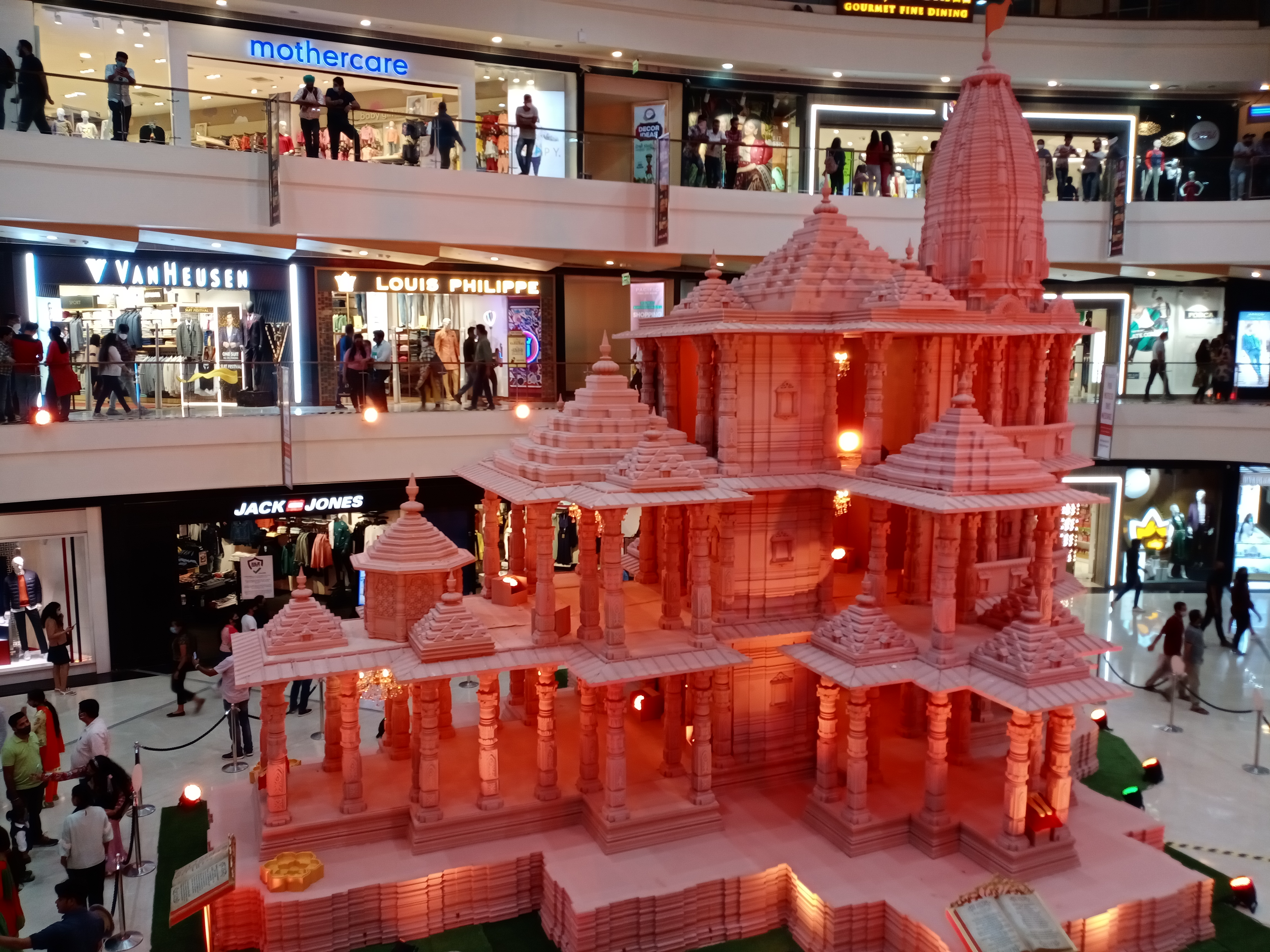
A 9.8-metre (32 ft) model of Ram Mandir displayed during Diwali of 2020 at Pacific Mall in West Delhi

The temple construction has been accompanied by a $10 billion transformation plan for Ayodhya, "encompassing a new airport, revamped railway station, and township development", fostering multiple hotel development projects and stimulating various economic activities. As Hindu devotees all over the world throng to have a darśana (auspicious viewing) of this deity, the subsequent economic impact has been estimated to further enrich the state by the end of the year 2024 by four trillion Indian rupees (equivalent to 48 billion US dollars).

After the opening of the Ram Temple to public on 23 January 2024, Ayodhya has welcomed 2.4 million visitors in just 12 days. Based on the current visitor numbers, the Ayodhya's Ram temple is projected to become one of the most visited pilgrimage sites in the world, surpassing Mecca and the Vatican. Given the temple rush by devotees from all parts of India, it was estimated that spiritual tourism at Ayodhya has potential to create thousands of jobs as more manpower is required to cater the needs of the Ram mandir visitors and also attract huge investments.

On April 17, 2024, the first Ram Navami (Ram's birth) festival after the consecration of the Ram Temple was celebrated by thousands of devotees. On this occasion, the Ram Temple witnessed a unique event at noon as the forehead of the Ram Lalla idol was anointed with a ray of sunlight, known as Sūrya Tilaka (transl. Sun tilak). As the sun rays illuminated the forehead of the Lord Ram Lalla idol, scores of devotees celebrated the event. The development of the Sūrya Tilaka mechanism involved collaboration between scientists from Central Building Research Institute (CBRI), Roorkee, and the Indian Institute of Astrophysics (IIAP), Bangalore, who devised a sophisticated apparatus consisting of mirrors and lenses to direct a beam of light to the deity's forehead, marking a significant scientific feat.

Since its inauguration in January 2024, the Ram Mandir has become one of India's most visited Hindu pilgrimage centres, with estimated 50 million visitors annually.

== In popular culture ==
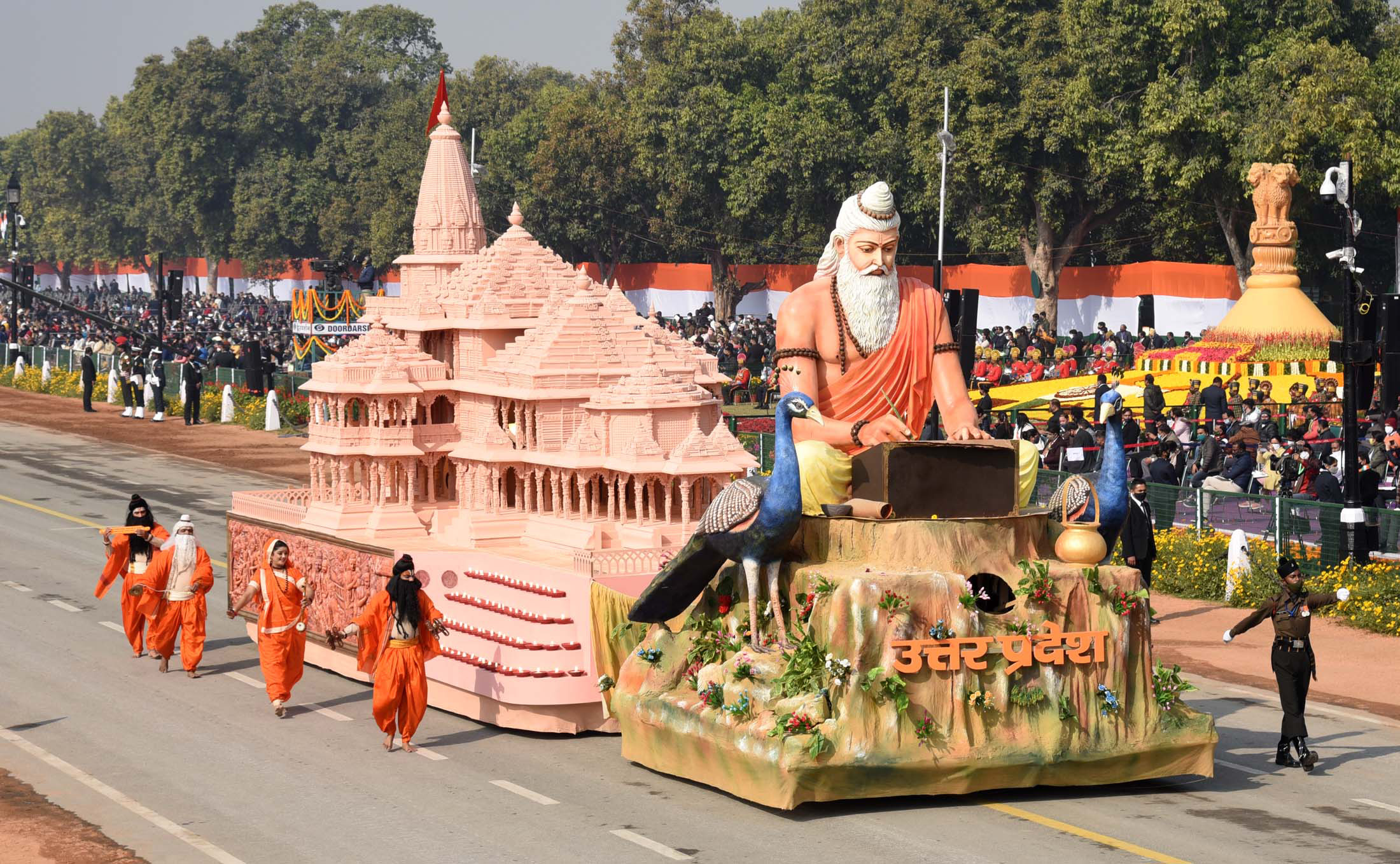
Uttar Pradesh tableau in the Republic Day parade of 2021

During the 2021 Republic Day parade on Rajpath, Uttar Pradesh's tableau showcased a replica of the Ram Mandir. In October 2023, Durga Puja celebrations in Santosh Mitra Square, Kolkata exhibited a replica of Ram Mandir, along with other notable buildings around the world.

=== Slogans ===
Maṁdira vahīṁ banāēm̐gē (transl. The temple will be built exactly there) is an expression in Hindi, and has become one of the most popular slogans concerning the Ram Janmabhoomi movement and the Ram Mandir. It has been used as early as 1985–86, was popularised in the 1990s, and has several variations.

It has been a symbol of hope and it has become a part of festivities, and has also become a part of stand-up comedy, jokes and memes. In 2019, the slogan was used in the Parliament of India, and it has also been used by media houses. The slogan has been used as a threat as well as a vow.

There are variations of the slogan such as one used by Lal Krishna Advani: "Saugaṁdha Rāma kī khātē haiṁ, hama maṁdira vahīṁ banāēm̐gē" (transl. We take a vow of Rama that we will build the temple exactly there). Other variations and adaptations include "Vahīṁ banēgā maṁdira" (transl. A temple will be built there), "Jahām̐ Rāma kā janma huā thā, hama maṁdira vahīṁ banāēm̐gē" (transl. The temple will be built where Rama was born), "Rāmā Lallā hama āēm̐gē, maṁdira vahīṁ banāēm̐gē" (transl. Ram Lalla, we will come, the temple will be built there, or Ram Lalla we will come to construct a Mandir exactly there) and "Pahalē maṁdira, phira sarakāra" (transl. First the temple, then the government).

=== Books ===
- The Battle for Rama: Case of the Temple at Ayodhya by Meenakshi Jain, ISBN 9788173055799, 8173055793
- Sunrise over Ayodhya: Nationhood in Our Times by Salman Khurshid, ISBN 9789354923050, 9354923054

=== Films ===
- Mission Ayodhya directed by Sameer Ramesh Surve

== See also ==
- Shri Raghunath Mandir
- Hindu pilgrimage sites in India
- Hindu pilgrimage sites of world
- List of Hindu festivals
- Rama Navami festival
- Tourism in India
- Devashila Yatra
- Ramnam Bank

== Sources ==
- Dumper, Michael (2020). Power, Piety, and People: The Politics of Holy Cities in the Twenty-First Century. Columbia University Press.
