= K. Parasaran =

Indian lawyer

Keshava Parasaran

MP of Rajya Sabha (Nominated)
- In office 29 June 2012 – 28 June 2018

Attorney General for India
- In office 9 August 1983 – 8 December 1989
- Prime Minister: Indira Gandhi; Rajiv Gandhi
- Preceded by: L.N. Sinha
- Succeeded by: Soli Sorabjee

Solicitor General of India
- In office 6 March 1980 – 8 August 1983
- Prime Minister: Indira Gandhi
- Preceded by: Soli Sorabjee
- Succeeded by: Milon K. Banerji

Advocate General of Tamil Nadu
- In office 1976–1977
- Preceded by: Govind Swaminadhan
- Succeeded by: V. P. Raman

Personal details
- Born: 9 October 1927 (age 99) Srirangam, Tamil Nadu, India
- Spouse: Shrimati Saroja Parasaran (after 1949)
- Children: 5, including Mohan Parasaran
- Parent: R. Kesava Aiyangar (father)
- Education: B.A. (Economics), Presidency College, Chennai; B.L., Law College, Madras
- Occupation: Lawyer/Advocate
- Awards: Padma Bhushan(2003), Padma Vibhushan(2011)

Keshava Parasaran (born 9 October 1927) is a lawyer from India. He was Advocate General of Tamil Nadu during the president's rule in 1976, Solicitor General of India under the then Prime Minister Indira Gandhi, and Attorney General of India under Prime Ministers Indira Gandhi and Rajiv Gandhi between 1983 and 1989 until the end of Rajiv's tenure. Parasaran was awarded the Padma Bhushan in the year 2003 and Padma Vibhushan in the year 2011. In June 2012, he received a presidential nomination to the Rajya Sabha, the upper house of India's parliament, for a period of six years. He is a member of Shri Ram Janmabhoomi Teerth Kshetra. In 2019 the Central Government appointed him to lead the Shri Ram Janmabhoomi Teerth Kshetra. However later, Mahant Nritya Gopal Das was appointed to lead the trust. The trust oversaw the construction of the Ram Temple in Ayodhya.

== Early life and education ==
Born in the Srirangam district of Tamil Nadu, Parasaran is the son of Kesava Iyengar, a lawyer, and Shrimati Ranganayaki. While pursuing his BL (now, BA. LLB), he was awarded the Shri Justice C.V. Kumarasamy Sastri Sanskrit Medal and Justice Shri V. Bhashyam Iyengar Gold Medal in Hindu Law. During the Bar Council examination, he received the Justice Shri K.S. Krishnasamy Iyengar Medal.

== Career ==
Parasaran began his legal practice before the Supreme Court in 1958. He defended the National Judicial Appointments Commission in 2014, as a member of the Rajya Sabha. In a career spanning over six decades, Parasaran is known for his contribution in the following cases:

=== Sabarimala case ===
In the Sabarimala case, Parasaran defended the Nair Service Society by arguing that the ban restricting the entry of menstruating women in the Sabarimala Temple is right. He recited paragraphs from the Ramayana to explain the concept of Naishtika Brahmacharya, that is, the celibate nature of the deity Ayyappan.

=== Ayodhya land dispute case ===
Parasaran successfully fought the Ayodhya land dispute case for the Hindu parties. Furthermore, he has been named as a trustee in the Shri Ram Janmabhoomi Teerth Kshetra. He was described as "Pitamah of the Indian Bar" by Sanjay Kishan Kaul for his contribution.

== Personal life ==
In 1949, Parasaran married Saroja, and has three sons, Mohan Parasaran, who was Solicitor General of India during the Congress led UPA 2 Government, Balaji Parasaran, and Satish Parasaran and two daughters.

== Award ==
- Padma Bhushan (2003)
- Padma Vibhushan (2011)
- Most Eminent Senior Citizen (2019)
- Shri Narayan Guru award (Swarajya award) (2020)
