= Shri Ram Janmbhoomi Teerth Kshetra =

Trust for a Hindu temple in Ayodhya, India

- Abbreviation: SRJBTK
- Formation: 5 February 2020; 6 years ago
- Type: Trust
- Headquarters: R-20, Greater Kailash Part -1, New Delhi, India
- Location: Ram Janmabhoomi
- Region served: Ayodhya, Uttar Pradesh, India
- Members: 15
- Chairman: Mahant Nrityagopal Das
- General Secretary: Krishna Mohan (Interim)
- CEO: Air Marshal Jeetendra Mishra
- Website: srjbtkshetra.org

The Shri Ram Janmbhoomi Teerth Kshetra (SRJBTK) is a trust set up for the construction and management of Ram Mandir, a Hindu temple complex in Ayodhya by the Government of India in February 2020. The trust is composed of 15 trustees.

The trust was formed after the 2019 Supreme Court verdict on Ayodhya dispute, in which the court directed the central government to set up a trust to oversee and manage the construction of the temple. In February 2020, the government nominated 12 of 15 members of the trust, and Kesava Parasaran, the former Attorney General was made the acting chairman. The trust nominated the remaining members and elected Mahant Nrityagopal Das as the chairman. In November 2020, the trust appointed Larsen & Toubro as the design-and-build contractor and Tata Consulting Engineers as the project management consultant for the construction of the temple.

The composition of the trust includes 9 permanent and 6 nominated members. The initial permanent members included attorney K. Parasaran, four religious leaders, a representative from the Nirmohi Akhara, two prominent civilians from Ayodhya district and a Dalit representative. The nominated members included a representative of the central government, who will be an IAS officer, and a representative of the state government, also an IAS officer, while the District Magistrate of Ayodhya will be the ex-officio trustee.

In February 2020, the trust members elected Ram Janmabhoomi Nyas as chief, Nritya Gopal Das as the Chairman and VHP vice-president Champat Rai as the General Secretary. Govind Dev Giri Ji became the Treasurer. The Prana Pratishtha (consecration) took place on 22 January 2024.

The trust has faced several allegations of mismanagement, corruption, and misappropriation of donations. In June 2021, there were allegations of corruption in a land acquisition by the trust around the temple, though the trust denied them. In January 2024, a cyber fraud scheme was uncovered involving an unauthorized website that falsely claimed affiliation with the trust and offered "free delivery" of the temple's prasad, prompting the Court to suspend the website. In June 2026, allegations emerged of embezzlement of devotees' donations, and the Uttar Pradesh government announced the formation of a Special Investigation Team (SIT) to investigate donation management.

== History ==
It was created as per the verdict of the Supreme Court on the M Siddiq(D) Thr Lrs v/s Mahant Suresh Das & Ors case. The court directed the central government to set up a trust to oversee and manage the construction of the temple within three months of the judgement. Prime Minister Narendra Modi announced the formation of the trust in the Lok Sabha on 5 February 2020.

The trust was awarded the disputed 2.77-acre land as well as the 67.703-acre land acquired under the Acquisition of Certain Area at Ayodhya Act, 1993 following the Supreme Court verdict in this regard.

The central government nominated the 12 of 15 members of the trust. K. Parasaran, the former Attorney General who represented Shri Ram Lalla Virajmaan in the Ayodhya case, was made the acting chairman. On 19 February 2020, the trust nominated the rest of its members and elected Mahant Nrityagopal Das as the chairman.

The senior trustees had signed an agreement with C.B. Sompura in 1992 for architecture design services which was revalidated with additional provisions. In November 2020, the trust appointed Larsen & Toubro as the design & build contractor and Tata Consulting Engineers as the project manager consultant for the construction of the temple. In February 2020, further contracts were signed with Tata Consulting Engineers and Design Associates Inc. for the development of the 67-acre temple complex.

== Composition of Trustees ==
The trust will have 15 members, of which 9 are permanent and 6 are nominated members with each member must be a practicing Hindu.

Permanent members:

- K. Parasaran: represented Shri Ram Lalla Virajmaan
- Four religious leaders from various temples across India
- A representative from the Nirmohi Akhara
- Two prominent civilians from Ayodhya district
- A Dalit representative

Nominated members:

- Two prominent persons to be elected by the trust through majority resolution to be part of the trust
- One representative to be nominated by the central government, who will be an IAS officer, at least of joint secretary level
- One representative to be nominated by the state government and would be an IAS officer under the state government
- The District Magistrate of Ayodhya will be the ex-officio trustee (If the serving DM is not a Hindu then the additional magistrate will sit on the board)
- The chairman of the construction committee of the Ram Mandir complex will also be selected by the trust board and will be an ex-officio trustee

The temple trust set up by the government was initially headed by Parasaran was tasked to nominate the remaining three members. On 19 February 2020, the first meeting of trust held at the residence of Parasaran, elected Ram Janmabhoomi Nyas as chief, Nritya Gopal Das as the Chairman and VHP vice-president, Champat Rai as the General Secretary. Both of them were elected unanimously to the trust. Former IAS officer and Principal Secretary, Nripendra Misra was nominated as the Chairman of the construction committee. Govind Dev Giri Ji Maharaj is the Treasurer and K. Parasaran is the Senior Spokesperson of the trust.

Of 15, only 11 trustees have voting rights. The two officers appointed by the state and central government, district collector of Ayodhya and the representative of Nirmohi Akhara will not have any voting rights in the proceedings of the trust.

== Controversies and Allegations ==
=== 2021 Land Purchase Allegations ===
In June 2021, political leaders from the Aam Aadmi Party (AAP) and the Samajwadi Party (SP), including Sanjay Singh and Pawan Pandey, alleged corruption in a land acquisition made by the Shri Ram Janmabhoomi Teerth Kshetra Trust. They claimed that a 1.2-hectare plot of land in Ayodhya was purchased by two individuals for ₹2 crore and then sold to the trust minutes later for ₹18.5 crore. The politicians demanded probes by the Central Bureau of Investigation (CBI) and the Enforcement Directorate (ED), alleging money laundering.

The trust, through its general secretary Champat Rai, denied the allegations. The trust clarified that the initial ₹2 crore transaction was the execution of a prior agreement made years earlier between the original owners and the two individuals. The subsequent sale to the trust at ₹18.5 crore was based on the prevailing market rates, which had surged following the 2019 Supreme Court verdict and the commencement of the temple's construction. The trust maintained that the acquisition process was transparent and the price paid was lower than the actual market value of the prime real estate.

=== 2024 Prasad Cyber Fraud ===
Prior to the temple's consecration ceremony in January 2024, a major cyber fraud scheme was uncovered involving an unauthorized website named khadiorganic.com. The portal falsely claimed affiliation with the trust and the Khadi and Village Industries Commission, offering "free delivery" of the temple's prasad (holy offering) while charging domestic and international delivery fees. The scam collected approximately ₹3.85 crore from over six lakh devotees.

The Delhi High Court intervened, suspending the rogue website for misappropriating trademarks and deceiving the public. The Ayodhya Police subsequently arrested the mastermind, Ashish Singh, and initiated a refund process, returning over ₹2 crore to the defrauded victims.

=== 2026 Donation Embezzlement Probe ===
In June 2026, allegations emerged regarding the massive embezzlement of cash and valuables donated by devotees at the temple. The issue was raised publicly by Samajwadi Party president Akhilesh Yadav, who demanded judicial intervention, claiming that crores of rupees in offerings to the Ram Mandir had gone missing. Former SP MLA Pawan Pandey also alleged that around ₹7 to ₹7.5 crore in donations had been swindled.

Initially, Trust general secretary Champat Rai rejected the claims, maintaining that internal audits were underway and that no evidence supporting the claims had emerged. However, following a request for a formal investigation from the Shri Ram Janmabhoomi Teerth Kshetra Trust itself, the Uttar Pradesh government announced the formation of a three-member Special Investigation Team (SIT) on 13 June 2026 to investigate the financial records and donation management.

The SIT panel comprised Lucknow Divisional Commissioner Vijay Vishwas Pant, Inspector General of Police (Lucknow range) Kiran S., and Special Secretary (Finance) Neel Ratan. The committee was directed to submit a preliminary report within seven days and a final report within 15 days. During the inquiry process, police detained an individual connected to cash-counting for questioning and reportedly recovered significant amounts of cash. Ram Mandir Construction Committee chairman Nripendra Mishra welcomed the rapid government response and the appointment of senior officers to lead the investigation.

== List of chairpersons ==
S. No.	Portrait	Name	Took office	Left office	Term	Background
Acting		K. Parasaran	5 February 2020	19 February 2020	14 days	Former Attorney General of India
1		Nritya Gopal Das	20 February 2020	Incumbent	6 years, 246 days	Chief of Shri Krishna Janmasthan Seva Sansthan Chief of Mani Ram Das ki Chavani

== See also ==
- Ram Janmabhoomi Nyas
