= Ram Rath Yatra =

1990 political–religious rally in India

- The planned route of L. K. Advani's Rath Yatra, beginning in Somnath on 25 September 1990 and ending in Ayodhya on 30 October
- Date: 25 September – 30 October 1990

The Ram Rath Yatra (lit. 'Rama chariot journey') was a political and religious rally that lasted from September to October 1990. It was organised by the Bharatiya Janata Party (BJP) and its Hindu nationalist affiliates, and led by the then-president of the BJP, L. K. Advani. The purpose of the yatra was to support the agitation, led by the Vishva Hindu Parishad (VHP) and its affiliates in the Sangh Parivar, to erect a temple to the Hindu deity Rama on the site of the Babri Masjid.

The masjid, or mosque, had been built in the city of Ayodhya following the Mughal conquest of the region in 1528. According to hearsay, it was built over a temple dedicated to Rama, and stood on the site of his birth. In the 1980s, the VHP and other Sangh Parivar affiliates began an agitation to build a temple to Rama at the site, with the BJP lending political support to the movement. In 1990, the government of India led by V. P. Singh decided to implement some of the recommendations of the Mandal commission, and announced that twenty-seven percent of government jobs would be reserved for people from Other Backward Class. This announcement threatened the electoral constituency of the BJP, which decided to use the Ayodhya dispute to unite the Hindu vote by mobilising anti-Muslim sentiment.

In order to further this movement, the BJP announced a ratha yatra, or "chariot journey" across the country to Ayodhya. The procession was led by L. K. Advani, and involved thousands of karsevaks, or volunteers, from the Sangh Parivar. The yatra began in Somnath on 25 September 1990, and passed through hundreds of villages and cities. It traveled approximately 300 kilometers a day, and Advani often addressed six public rallies in a single day. The yatra caused an outpouring of both religious and militant sentiments among Hindus, and became one of the biggest and greatest mass movements in Indian history.

The yatra also triggered religious violence in its wake, with riots in cities across North India. As a result, Advani was arrested by the government of Bihar as the yatra passed through that state, and 150,000 of his supporters were also arrested by the government of Uttar Pradesh. Tens of thousands of activists nonetheless reached Ayodhya and attempted to storm the mosque, resulting in a pitched battle with security forces which left 15 dead. These events caused further Hindu-Muslim riots to break out across the country, in which hundreds were killed. Muslims were often the victims of these riots, particularly in the state of Uttar Pradesh. Following these riots, the BJP withdrew its support to the Union government, leading to early parliamentary elections. The BJP made significant gains in these elections, both at the national and the state level, on the back of religious polarisation caused by the yatra.

== Background and motivation ==
In Hindu tradition, the birthplace of the deity Rama, known as "Ram Janmabhoomi", is considered a holy site. This site is often believed to be located in the city of Ayodhya in Uttar Pradesh, at the place where the Babri Masjid stood. Historical evidence to support this belief is scarce, and several historians have stated that Ayodhya became a religious centre with a number of temples only in the 18th century AD. Additionally, the location of Ayodhya itself is a matter of dispute, since the city has shifted slightly over the millennia. Following the Mughal conquest of the region in 1528, a mosque was built in Ayodhya by the Mughal general Mir Baqi, who named it the Babri Masjid after the Mughal emperor Babur. According to hearsay, Baqi destroyed a pre-existing temple of Rama at the site. Limited historical evidence exists to support this theory, and the existence of the temple itself is a matter of controversy. Numerous historians have stated that there is limited evidence to support the notion that Rama was born at the precise location of the Babri Masjid, or that a temple to Rama once stood at the site.

For several centuries after the construction of the mosque, the site was used for religious purposes by both Hindus and Muslims. The first recorded claim that the mosque stood on the site of Rama's birth was made in 1822. Citing this claim, the Nirmohi Akhara, a Hindu sect, laid claim to the mosque, resulting in inter-communal violence in the period 1853–55. In 1949, an idol of Rama was surreptitiously placed inside the mosque, and an attempt was made to convince devotees that it had appeared miraculously. An official investigation concluded that the mosque had been desecrated and the idol placed there by three men, together with a large band of supporters. This caused an uproar among Muslim people who used the mosque, and the gates to the mosque were locked on the orders of the state government. In the 1980s a movement led by the Vishva Hindu Parishad (VHP) began advocating demolishing the mosque and building a temple there dedicated to Rama, heightening religious tension across the country. In 1986, the district magistrate of Ayodhya ordered that the gates be opened once more, and Hindus be allowed access to the shrine. Following its poor performance in the 1984 parliamentary election, the Bharatiya Janata Party (BJP) shifted toward a policy of more hardline Hindu nationalism, and lent its support to the demand that a temple be built at Ayodhya. On the strength of this agitation, the BJP won 86 Lok Sabha seats in 1989, a tally which made its support crucial to the National Front government.

In August 1990, then-Prime Minister V. P. Singh, acting on the recommendations of the Mandal Commission, decided to introduce a policy of reserving twenty-seven per cent of state level government posts for people from lower castes. The new policy was partially an attempt to trim the electoral support of the Bharatiya Janata Party. The core constituency of the BJP were people from upper castes, who had until then held a monopoly over government jobs. The new policy thus fed resentment among the upper-castes, and raised inter-caste tensions in some parts of the country. Mobilising Hindus around the Ayodhya dispute was seen by the BJP as a way to unite its electorate, by creating an issue around which all Hindus could be united against Muslims. This effort tied in well with the philosophy of the Sangh Parivar, which professed "cultural nationalism", and believed in the unity of the highly fragmented Hindu population. Since its founding in 1925, supported for the Rashtriya Swayamsevak Sangh (RSS) had been restricted to people of upper castes. The same was true of the Bharatiya Jana Sangh, and its successor, the BJP, which acted as the political wing of the RSS. By supporting the Ram Janmabhoomi agitation, the BJP hoped to spread its influence outside this demographic.

== Rath Yatra ==
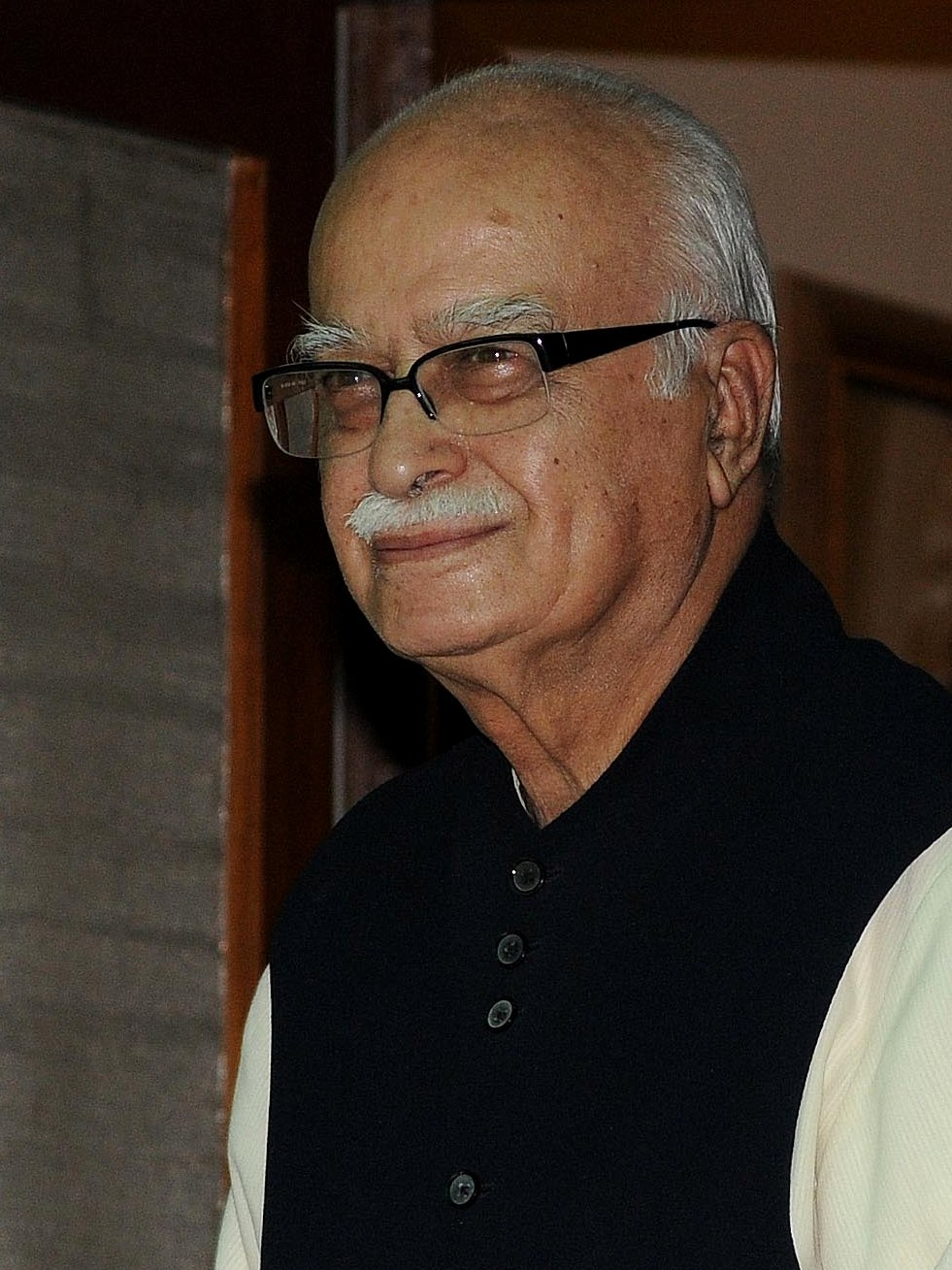
L. K. Advani, then-President of the Bharatiya Janata Party, who led the Ram Rath Yatra

=== Etymology and philosophy ===
As a part of its support for the Ram Janmabhoomi agitation, the BJP organised a rath yatra, or "chariot journey" across the country to Ayodhya in 1990. The yatra was led by then-BJP President L. K. Advani. The Sanskrit word Yatra is variously translated as "journey", "procession", or "pilgrimage": the idea of pilgrimage is a significant one in Hindu traditions. The term Rath Yatra refers to a procession involving a rath, or chariot, a frequent occurrence at religious sites. In recent decades, displays of strength by Hindu nationalist groups have often been described as yatras, and the idea of the pilgrimage itself has often been harnessed by Hindu nationalists to mobilise support. The city of Ayodhya, in particular, is a place of pilgrimage in the Hindu tradition, because it is seen as a site where a devotee may obtain eternal salvation, a belief used to inspire support for the Ram Rath Yatra. Hindu pilgrimages have traditionally been spaces where caste and gender barriers have been broken to a limited extent. Thus the BJP, seeking to unite its electorate, which was divided by caste-based discrimination, found the imagery of a pilgrimage useful. Furthermore, pilgrimages or processions frequently involve an assertion of dominance over a physical space, which was also relevant to the Ayodhya dispute; the ultimate aim of the yatra was to support the agitation of the VHP and its Sangh Parivar affiliates to erect a temple to the Hindu deity Rama on the site of the Babri Masjid.

=== Route and imagery ===
Advani, then the president of the BJP, announced the yatra on 12 September 1990. The rath yatra began on 25 September 1990, seeking to capitalise on the massive protests across north India against the reservation bill. The yatra was supposed to be 10,000 kilometres long, and was planned with the intention of converging on Ayodhya and forcing the government to hand over the site to the Hindutva forces for the construction of a temple. The yatra began at the Hindu holy city of Somnath, and was planned to go through the states of Gujarat, Maharashtra, Andhra Pradesh, Madhya Pradesh, and Bihar, before reaching the city of Ayodhya in Uttar Pradesh. Both Somnath and Ayodhya had political significance to the Hindu nationalist movement, because of their association with the legacy of Muslim invaders and rulers. Ayodhya, in particular, was seen as the symbol of Hindu humiliation at the hands of Muslim rulers. Additionally, the BJP wished to draw a parallel between its effort to build a temple in Ayodhya, and the reconstruction of the Somnath temple, undertaken by the Indian National Congress (INC)-led government of India in the 1950s.

The imagery of the procession was designed to represent religious themes. The "chariot" was escorted by activists dressed as mythological deities, and the people marching with the chariot sang songs and raised slogans that had religious themes. A few people marched with the rath the entire way, but a much larger number attended rallies at each stop. The rath itself was an air-conditioned converted Toyota redesigned to be a chariot. Historian Ramachandra Guha stated that the imagery of the yatra was "religious, allusive, militant, masculine, and anti-Muslim". The yatra itself was preceded by an intense propaganda campaign carried out by volunteers of the Bajrang Dal and the VHP. Along the entire route of the yatra they distributed pamphlets and posters describing the proposed temple, and vilifying Muslims. VHP leaders made speeches in which they stated that Hindus of past years had shown "impotence" in allowing their holy sites to be taken over by Muslims, and asked them to be more aggressive in the present instance.

=== Initial stages ===
The yatra was flagged off in Somnath with scenes of "frenzied religious sentiments and militant national fervour". Supporters presented Advani with several gifts, including Saffrom flags, a sword, and a bow-and-arrow. Supporters chanted religious hymns as well as battle-cries.

The yatra began one of the most significant mass movements in Indian history. Advani covered an average of 300 kilometres (190 mi) per day, and he typically addressed six rallies in a day. The rath passed through about 600 villages in Gujarat, and 50 rallies were held. In the village of Jetpur, Hindu nationalist activists donated a jar full of their own blood to Advani as a symbol of their faith. After Gujarat, the caravan went to Maharashtra, where activist fervour was even stronger because of the support of the Shiv Sena, a radical Hindu nationalist party. The yatra then passed through Telangana (then within Andhra Pradesh), in an attempt to mobilise supporters in an area where the BJP had little electoral strength, followed by Madhya Pradesh and Rajasthan. The level of popular mobilisation in each state was higher than the press had previously expected, and the yatra began to receive more national news coverage. Slogans coined by the followers included "Garv se kaho, ham Hindu hein!" ("Say with pride that we are Hindus!") An editorial in a national newspaper stated:

At every village all along its route ... crowds ranging from hundreds to thousands turned out to see him. In the towns they clambered on to roofs to catch a glimpse of the bespectacled man on the 'Rath'.

Advani's speeches during the yatra addressed Hindu nationalist themes. He portrayed the Ayodhya dispute as a fight between Rama and the Mughal emperor Babur, and stated that no Hindu could live in peace until a temple had been built on the site of the Babri Masjid. Militant sentiments were visible throughout the rally, as Advani was presented with bows and arrows, tridents, maces, daggers, and swords. BJP leader Pramod Mahajan stated that "If we are to use all the weapons presented to us, we can liberate the Ram Janmabhoomi in a day", while Shiv Sena leader Bal Thackeray "threatened to wipe out the 'unholy green' (the color associated with Islam), if the temple construction was obstructed".

=== Advani's arrest ===
The yatra caused growing unrest in its wake, resulting in the government being forced to take action against it. Throughout the yatra, the organisers chose multiple times to defy administrative measures to minimise the impact of it. Sumanta Banerjee stated that the people arrested along the course of the rath yatra had all committed to violating the law. Advani paused the yatra in Delhi for several days, daring the central government to arrest him, which it did not. However, on 23 October the Indian Prime Minister V. P. Singh authorised Lalu Prasad Yadav, the Chief Minister of Bihar, to arrest Advani as the procession crossed the border with the state of Uttar Pradesh. Advani was placed in preventive custody. Following his imprisonment, Advani was held in the Masanjore Guest House, a luxury government accommodation. After his release, he stated that through the success of the rally, the power of the people had defeated the power of the state. VHP leader Ashok Singhal was also arrested, but escaped from police custody within a day. Other activists arrested were often improperly detained, or allowed to escape.

Despite Advani's arrest, the kar sevaks or activists accompanying the yatra continued on towards Ayodhya. Mulayam Singh Yadav, the Chief minister of Uttar Pradesh, ordered the arrest of all activists bound for Ayodhya, and 150,000 individuals were jailed. However, a large number of activists succeeded in reaching Ayodhya. Guha estimates this number at 75,000, while Christophe Jaffrelot states that it was 40,000. The town also held 20,000 security personnel, brought there by the state government. On 30 October a large number of activists pushed past the cordon of security officers, and moved towards the Babri Masjid. Although they were intercepted by more security forces, they succeeded in avoiding these, and reached the mosque. There, one volunteer placed a saffron flag on top of the mosque, while other activists attempted to tear the building down using tools such as axes and hammers. The security personnel responded by initially using tear gas to expel the kar sevaks, and later using live ammunition. The kar sevaks were pushed away from the mosque, but a pitched battle with security followed, which lasted three days. 15 kar sevaks were fatally shot by the police, although the VHP claimed that 59 had died, while some Hindi newspapers in Uttar Pradesh sensationally reported that as many as 100 had died. The VHP cremated those killed and carried their ashes across the country. Hindus were urged to avenge their deaths, and the deceased were celebrated as martyrs. Religious riots followed across the country, particularly in Uttar Pradesh, where mobs of Hindus attacked neighbourhoods dominated by Muslims, as well as individuals visibly identifiable as Muslim.

=== Communal riots ===
Through the course of the yatra, the participants were frequently aided by the governments of the states they passed through. The procession was often given a police escort, and Uttar Pradesh police force members are thought to have helped some activists gain access to the mosque, which the police were supposed to be protecting.

The yatra brought out militant sentiments in the cadre of the BJP, VHP, and Bajrang Dal, and there were several violent clashes along its route. These clashes intensified many-fold after Advani's arrest on 23 October. Riots targeting Muslims occurred in Jaipur, Jodhpur, Ahmedabad, Baroda, Hyderabad, and a few other places. Several hundred people died in these riots, including 130 people in Jaipur between 23 and 31 October. Historian K. N. Panikkar estimates that 116 communal riots occurred in total between 1 September and 20 November, in which 564 people were killed. Many of these riots occurred in areas that were not on the route of the yatra, but where religious hatred had nonetheless been triggered by it. The largest number of riots occurred in Uttar Pradesh, where 224 people were killed. According to a research study made by the Institute of Peace and Conflict Studies under Nagarik Mancha by B. Rajeshwari, which compiles all the communal riots that broke out in India between 1947 and 2003, in the wake of Advani's rath yatra, nearly 1,800 people died in communal riots in different parts of India in 1990, the majority of whom were Muslims.

== Aftermath ==
=== BJP electoral success ===
The BJP made the Ayodhya agitation a large part of its campaign in the 1991 parliamentary elections, often with the support of the VHP. Its intense campaign drew it a lot of support, particularly campaign funding. The Ram Janmabhoomi issue allowed the BJP to gain significant support in rural areas, whereas it had previously been restricted to support from the urban middle class.

Following the Rath Yatra and the associated protests, the BJP withdrew its support to the National Front central government led by V. P. Singh, leading to its collapse. It also prompted the Mulayam Singh Yadav-led Uttar Pradesh state government, in its eagerness to consolidate Muslim votes, to use excessive police force against BJP workers and kar-sevaks, resulting in the alienation of Hindu communities from Singh's Samajwadi party in India's most populous state.

This BJP strategy paid rich dividends in the May–June 1991 parliamentary elections, even withstanding the sympathy wave caused by the assassination of Rajiv Gandhi that took place after the first phase of polling. Relative to the 1989 general election, the BJP doubled its percentage of votes nationwide and made gains in states like Karnataka and Andhra Pradesh in the South and Assam in the Northeast. It emerged as the second largest party in the Lok Sabha, after the Indian National Congress. It captured a majority of the Lok Sabha seats in Uttar Pradesh, where it also won a majority in the state legislative assembly and formed the government. Muslim votes were divided between the Indian National Congress and the Janata Dal, further helping the BJP. It also was able to win a majority of seats in the state legislatures of Rajasthan, Madhya Pradesh, and Himachal Pradesh, and made gains in several other states.

=== Demolition of the Babri Masjid ===
Carrying forward their campaign to build a temple at the site, the VHP, the BJP, and their affiliates organised a rally outside the mosque on 6 December 1992, involving 150,000 VHP and BJP volunteers. Several BJP leaders, including Advani, Murli Manohar Joshi and Uma Bharti, spoke at the rally. The crowd gradually grew more restive during the speeches, and began to shout slogans of a militant nature. Although a police cordon had been placed around the mosque in preparation for an attack, a young man slipped past the cordon around noon and climbed the mosque itself, waving a saffron flag. The mob took this as a signal to attack and stormed the mosque, bearing hammers and axes. The policemen were outnumbered and unprepared, and fled the scene. The crowd set upon the mosque unopposed, and leveled it within a few hours. Hindu mobs also demolished a number of other mosques in Ayodhya. The demolition triggered massive Hindu-Muslim violence across the country, in which more than 2000 people, the majority of them Muslim, were killed.

The central government ordered an inquiry into the demolition. The report of the inquiry, written by retired judge Manmohan Singh Liberhan, indicted 68 people for the demolition, including a number of BJP leaders. The people named in the report included Advani, Vajpayee, Joshi, and Bharathi, as well as then-Uttar Pradesh-chief minister Kalyan Singh. The report stated that Singh had appointed officers to the area who were less likely to act to prevent the demolition. It stated that the leaders of the BJP could have prevented the demolition if they had chosen to do so, and quoted a security official as saying that provocative speeches had been made at the rally. The report also stated that the demolition was "neither spontaneous nor unplanned". In April 2017, a special Central Bureau of Investigation court framed criminal conspiracy charges against Advani, Murli Manohar Joshi, Uma Bharti, Vinay Katiyar, and several others. In 2020 the court acquitted Advani, Singh, and all 30 others accused.
