= Champat Rai =

Indian social activist and former VHP Vice President (born 1946)

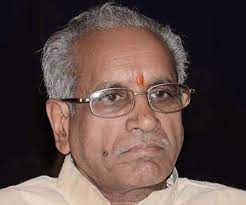
- Champat Rai
- Born: Champat Rai Bansal; 18 November 1946 (age 79); Nagina, Bijnor district, Uttar Pradesh, India
- Occupations: Lecturer (formerly), activist
- Organization(s): Vishva Hindu Parishad (International Vice President); Rashtriya Swayamsevak Sangh
- Known for: Ram Janmabhoomi movement
- Board member of: Shri Ram Janmabhoomi Teerth Kshetra (General Secretary, 2020–2026)
- Parent(s): Rameshwar Prasad Bansal (father); Savitri Devi (mother)

Champat Rai (born Champat Rai Bansal; 18 November 1946) is an Indian social leader, activist, and the International Vice President of the Vishva Hindu Parishad (VHP). For decades, he has been one of the primary organizational figures of the Ram Janmabhoomi movement. Following the 2019 Supreme Court of India verdict on the Ayodhya dispute, Rai was appointed as the foundational General Secretary of the Shri Ram Janmabhoomi Teerth Kshetra trust, which was established by the Government of India to supervise the construction of the Ram Mandir. He served in this capacity until his resignation in June 2026.

== Early life and academic career ==
Champat Rai was born on 18 November 1946 into the family of Rameshwar Prasad Bansal and Savitri Devi in the Mohalla Saraimir locality of Nagina tehsil, Bijnor district, Uttar Pradesh. From early childhood, Rai was associated with the Rashtriya Swayamsevak Sangh (RSS) and later became a full-time campaigner (pracharak) for the organization.

Rai pursued studies in the sciences and subsequently worked as a lecturer in Chemistry at the RSM Degree College in Dhampur, Bijnor. During the 1975–1977 Internal Emergency, Rai was arrested on his college premises due to his affiliation with the banned RSS. He spent approximately 18 months imprisoned across various district jails in Uttar Pradesh. Following his release, he resigned from his academic post to commit full-time to the movement.

== Activism and Ram Janmabhoomi movement ==
In 1980, Rai joined the Vishva Hindu Parishad (VHP). He was appointed as the VHP's prant co-organisation secretary in July 1986 and later became the organisation secretary for western Uttar Pradesh. He relocated to Ayodhya in 1991, serving as the co-organisation secretary for Uttar Pradesh until 1995.

Rai was present as a kar sevak during the demolition of the Babri Masjid on 6 December 1992. He was subsequently named in a chargesheet filed by the Central Bureau of Investigation (CBI) tracking criminal conspiracy. In September 2020, a special CBI court acquitted Rai alongside all other co-accused individuals, citing a lack of evidence regarding a premeditated conspiracy.

Rai documented and preserved historical revenue records, legal logs, and land maps related to the Ayodhya dispute. He assisted behind the scenes by supplying these archival resources to the legal counsel, including K. Parasaran, representing the Hindu litigation side before the Supreme Court.

== Trust leadership and donation controversy ==
After serving in multiple administrative capacities within the VHP—including central minister, joint general secretary, and general secretary—Rai was appointed International Vice President of the organization in 2018. On 19 February 2020, he was named the foundational General Secretary of the state-mandated Shri Ram Janmabhoomi Teerth Kshetra trust. Operating from Karsevak Puram in Ayodhya, Rai supervised day-to-day procurement, logistics, and the consecration ceremony of the temple on 22 January 2024.

In June 2026, Samajwadi Party chief Akhilesh Yadav alleged financial discrepancies regarding donation funds collected for the temple's construction. The issue escalated following the recovery of cash from the residence of a trust employee managing donations. In response, the Uttar Pradesh government established a three-member Special Investigation Team (SIT) comprising IAS officer Vijay Vishwas Pant, IPS officer Kiran S., and Finance Department Special Secretary Neel Ratan to investigate the matter.

Public scrutiny intensified when Rai's driver, Ramashankar Yadav (alias Tinnu Yadav), was identified as a suspect by investigators. Opposition parties and activists subsequently alleged administrative negligence and complicity in the siphoning of funds. Following these developments, Rai resigned from his post as General Secretary in late June 2026.
