= Nritya Gopal Das =

Hindu temple chief (born 1938)

Mahant Nritya Gopal Das
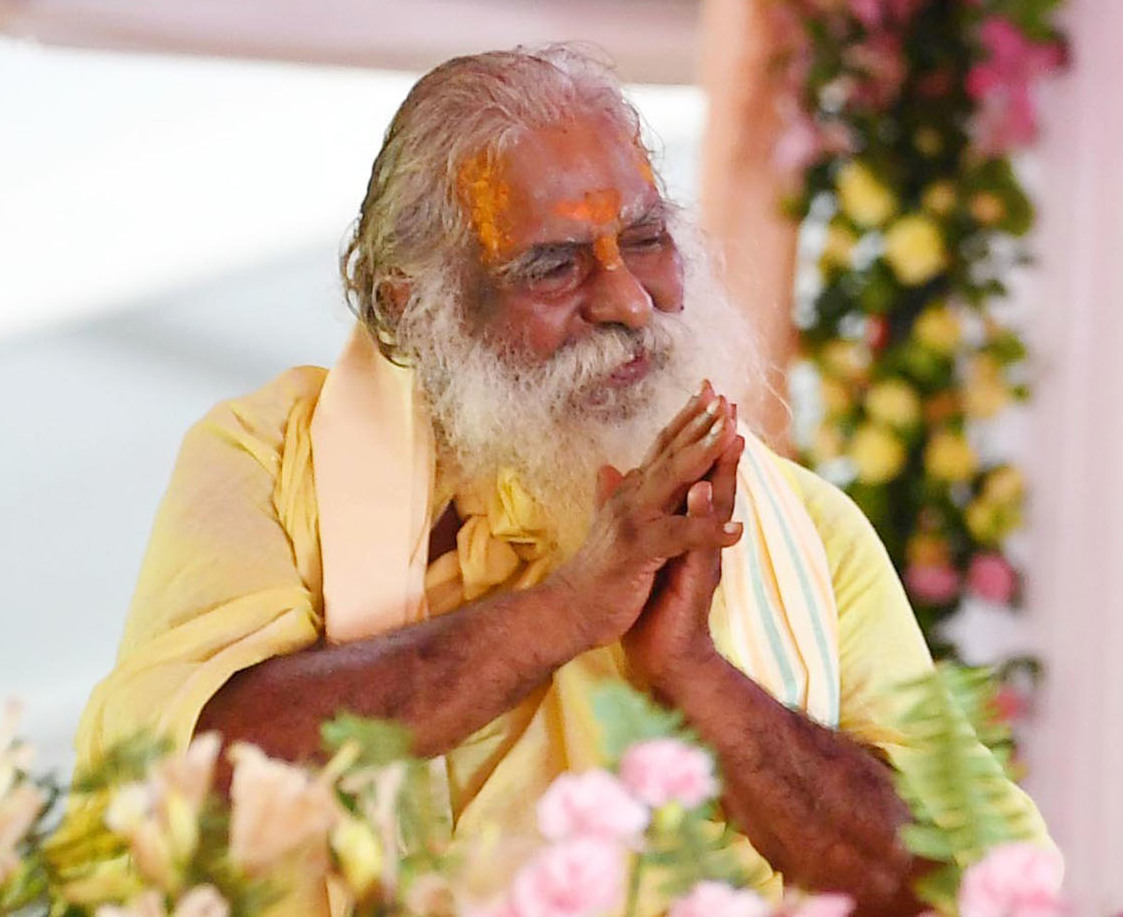
- Mahant Nritya Gopal Das during the Ram Mandir Bhoomi Pooja

Personal life
- Born: 11 June 1938 (age 88) Kerhala/Kahola village, Mathura district, India
- Honors: Spiritual successor of Shri Mani Ram Das Maharaj, 6th Mahant of Shri Mani Ram Das Chavni, Ramanandi (Bairagi) Saint; Chief, Ram Janmabhoomi Nyas; Chairperson, Shri Ram Janmabhoomi Teerth Kshetra

Religious life
- Religion: Hinduism

Religious career
- Teacher: Mahant Ram Manohar Das

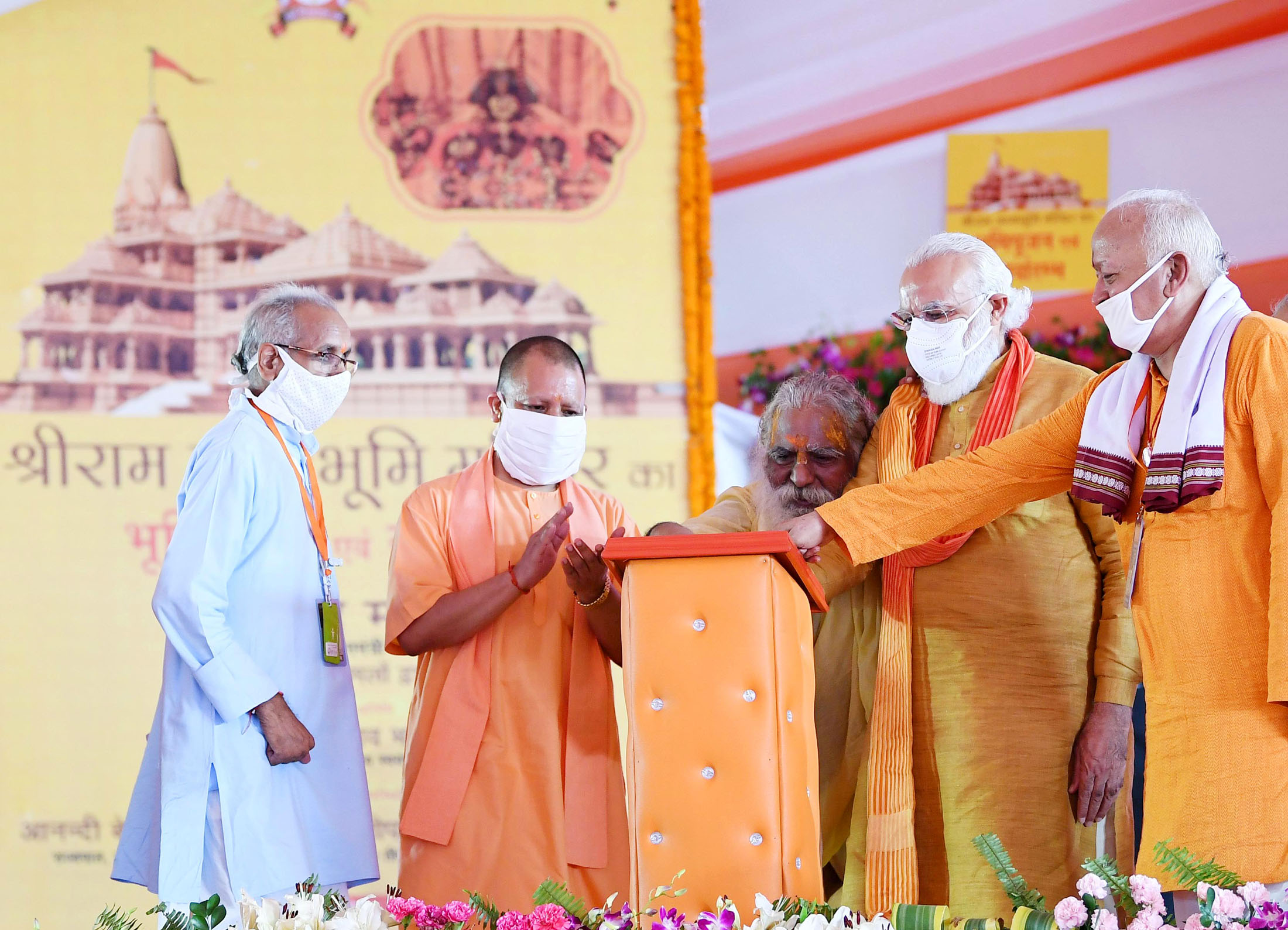
Nritya Gopal Das at the ceremony of unveiling the plaque to lay the foundation stone of Ram Janmabhoomi Mandir, in Ayodhya, Uttar Pradesh on 5 August 2020

Mahant Nritya Gopal Das (b 1938) is the head of Ayodhya's largest temple, the Mani Ram Das Ki Chavani, and the chief of the Ram Janmabhoomi Nyas and Shri Ram Janmabhoomi Teerth Kshetra, bodies formed to undertake the construction of the Ram Mandir in Ayodhya. He is also the head of the Shri Krishna Janmasthan Seva Sansthan.

== Background ==
He was born on 11 June 1938 in Kerhala village, Mathura district, Uttar Pradesh. After passing his class tenth exams in 1953 he took admission in a college in Mathura to study commerce, but soon left for Ayodhya when he was 12, before completing his studies. In Ayodhya, he became a disciple of Mahant Ram Manohar Das and graduated with a Shastri (degree) from Sanskrit University in Varanasi. In 1965, at the age of 27 he became a mahant, succeeding the sixth mahant of the Shri Mani Ram Das Chavni (Chhoti Chavani). The temple is one of the main religious and spiritual attractions of the city, and everyday Mahant Nritya Gopal Das meets hundreds of pilgrims. He is credited with the construction of temples including Ramayan Bhavan and Shri Char Dham temple. He runs the "Maniram Chhawni" where 500 sadhus stay. He has been actively associated with the Ram Janmabhoomi movement since 1984. He took over as the head of the Ram Janmabhoomi Nyas when Ramchandra Paramhans died in 2006 and he is currently the head of Shri Ram Janmabhoomi Teerth Kshetra. He was one of the accused in the Babri Masjid demolition case. He is also the head of the Shri Krishna Janambhoomi Trust.

Mark Tully narrates a meeting with Mahant Nritya Gopal Das in 1992 in his book India In Slow Motion:

The mahant insisted that although he was the vice-president of the trust established by the VHP to build their Rama temple, he had nothing to do with politics. […] Broad shoulders, with the arms of a wrestler, and the torso of a man who no longer exercised with the vigour of his youth, Nritya Gopal Das had the dishvelled appearance most sadhus cultivate. His broad forehead was smeared with orange paste, his oily greying hair, faintly coloured with henna, fell down to his shoulders, his beard was untrimmed, the white cotton robe wrapped round him creased. But he was a man used to commanding respect.

Mark Tully describes how the Mahant explained the pluralism of worshiping Rama, "that is the Hindu tradition, where there have always been different ways to worship Rama, and everyone is welcome to worship as they like." Dibyesh Anand recalls in an interview with Mahanat Das that initially the Mahant spoke about "how Hindus and Muslims are brothers and if only the Muslims gave away certain mosques, there would be harmony in India".
