= Mission Ayodhya =

2025 Indian film by Ramesh Surve

- Promotional poster
- Directed by: Sameer Ramesh Surve
- Written by: Story: Krishna Dadarav Shinde; Screenplay and Dialogue: Sameer Ramesh Surve
- Produced by: Krishna Dadarav Shinde; Yogita Krishna Shinde
- Starring: Nilesh Deshpande; Tejaswi Patil; Dr. Abhay Kamat; Satish Pulekar; Guruwesh Pandit; Shravani Shinde
- Cinematography: Nazir Khan
- Edited by: Prafull Mohite
- Music by: S.D. Sadguru
- Production company: R. K. Yogini Film Production Pvt. Ltd.
- Distributed by: Jayesh Mistry
- Release date: 24 January 2025
- Country: India
- Language: Marathi

Mission Ayodhya is a 2025 Indian Marathi-language drama film directed by Sameer Ramesh Surve. It is written and produced by Krishna Dadarav Shinde, with Yogita Krishna Shinde serving as co-producer. The film features a cast of newcomers, including Nilesh Deshpande, Tejaswi Patil, Dr. Abhay Kamat, Satish Pulekar, Guruwesh Pandit and Shravani Shinde. The story delves into the struggles and devotion involved in constructing the Ram Mandir in Ayodhya, as seen through the perspective of a teacher.

== Cast ==
- Nilesh Deshpande
- Tejaswi Patil
- Dr. Abhay Kamat
- Satish Pulekar
- Guruwesh Pandit
- Shravani Shinde
- Sneha Shinde
- Rudra Shinde
- Makarand Sawant
- Aslam Siddiqui
- Rahul Kulkarni
- Sharad Chaturvedi
- Sakar Desai
- Vineet Mapari
- Rupali Kamble
- Durgesh Kulkarni
- Vikrant Shinde
- Sagar Gunjal
- Moksh Guru
- Arjun Rathod
- Narendra Rasal
- Prajeet Tilak
- Mihir Satpute
- Samad Khan
- Shubham Prajapati

== Production ==
The film was officially announced in the first week of December 2024, accompanied by a poster featuring an image of the Prabhu Shri Ram Janmabhoomi Temple in Ayodhya. It is the first film to be shot in Ayodhya, with important scenes filmed at the Ram Mandir temple area. A casting workshop was organized, from which twenty actors were selected and given specialized acting training to prepare for their roles.

== Soundtrack ==
The soundtrack for the film is composed by S. D. Sadguru, with background music scored by Nilesh Dahanukar.

Track listing
No.	Title	Lyrics	Singer(s)	Length
1.	"Ramraya"	Abhijit Joshi	Javed Ali	3:30

== Marketing ==
The makers unveiled a 10-second static glimpse of the poster during the interval of the movie Pushpa 2. The poster depicted a figure standing amidst a whirlwind of ash and fire, firmly gripping the radiant flag of Lord Shri Ram, with chants of Lord Ram playing in the background. On 29 December 2024, the music launch ceremony was held at the Veer Savarkar Auditorium in Dadar, featuring the Sadho Band as special guests from Uttar Pradesh. The trailer was launched on 7 January 2025, at Chhatrapati Sambhaji Nagar in the presence of Mahant Ramgiri Maharaj. Dignitaries such as MLA Anuradha Chavan, Virupaksha Maharaj, Prahlad Maharaj Naval, and Madhukar Maharaj were also in attendance.

== Release ==
The film was released on 23 January 2025, coinciding with the first anniversary week of the inauguration ceremony of the Ram Mandir in Ayodhya.
