= Mohan Parasaran =

Solicitor General of India

Senior Advocate Mohan Parasaran

Solicitor General of India
- In office February 2013 – May 2014
- Preceded by: Rohinton Fali Nariman
- Succeeded by: Ranjit Kumar
- Prime Minister: Manmohan Singh

Additional Solicitor General of India
- In office 2004–2013
- Prime Minister: Manmohan Singh

Personal details
- Relations: K. Parasaran (father), Saroja Parasaran (mother)
- Education: University of Madras, Faculty of Law, University of Delhi, University of Cambridge
- Profession: Lawyer

Mohan Parasaran is a Senior Advocate at the Supreme Court of India. In February 2013 he was appointed the Solicitor General of India and continued in this post till May 2014. He served as part of the Congress led UPA 2 government. Previously he held the post of Additional Solicitor General of India for nine years. In 2012, he resigned from the post of Additional Solicitor General but the resignation was not accepted by the Government. He was designated senior advocate in 2002.

== Personal life ==
Parasaran is the son of the former Attorney General of India and Senior Advocate, K. Parasaran and Saroja Parasaran. He has two brothers and two sisters. He lives in New Delhi, but frequents Chennai, where he grew up. His mother Mrs Saroja Parasaran is first cousin of actor Kamalahasan.

== Education ==
Parasaran has received the B.A. (Economics) First Class from the University of Madras in 1981, a Bachelor of Law degree from Faculty of Law, University of Delhi in 1984 and a Master of Laws from the University of Cambridge.

== Appointment as Solicitor General ==
Parasaran was appointed as the Solicitor General of India after this post become vacant due to resignation of Rohinton Nariman before completion of his tenure. Rohinton Nariman had resigned from the post, allegedly, following a difference of opinion with the Law Minister, Ashwini Kumar. Mohan Parasaran's appointment as Solicitor General of India came to an end in May 2014 with the change in Government, and in his place, Ranjit Kumar has been appointed as the new Solicitor General of India with effect from 7 Jun 2014.

== Notable cases ==
Parasaran has represented the Government of India in landmark cases, including the dispute between the Ambani brothers on the KGD6 gasfields, international tax matters with revenue effect of over $3.2 billion in the Vodafone case, the levy of luxury tax, sports regulation, and public interest matters concerning food security and shelter. He has also appeared in the Commission of Inquiry, which probed into the Boeing 737 crash in Mangalore.
