= Central Building Research Institute =

Research institute in Uttarakhand, India

- CBRI Campus in Roorkee
- Established: 1947
- Director: Pradeep Kumar Ramancharla
- Location: Roorkee-247 667, Uttarakhand, India
- Coordinates: 29°51′55″N 77°54′08″E
- Interactive map of Central Building Research Institute
- Website: www.cbri.res.in

Central Building Research Institute (CBRI), located at Roorkee, Uttarakhand, India, is a constituent establishment of Council of Scientific and Industrial Research responsible for "generating, cultivating and promoting building science and technology" in India.

== Directors ==
- Pradeep Kumar Ramancharla November 2022 - Present
- N.Gopalakrishnan:
- Girish Sahni: Aug. 2015 – December 2015
- S. K. Bhattacharyya: 2009–2015
- Ganesh Babu Kodeboyina: 2005 - 2007
- V. K. Mathur: 2000–2005
- R. N. Iyengar: 1994–2000
- R. L. Pal: 1980-1993
