= 2019 Supreme Court verdict on Ayodhya dispute =

Indian land dispute ruling

- Court: Supreme Court of India
- Full case name: M Siddiq (D) Thr Lrs v. Mahant Suresh Das & Ors
- Decided: 9 November 2019

Case history
- Appealed from: High Court of Allahabad
- Appealed to: Supreme Court of India
- Subsequent action: See below

Court membership
- Judges sitting: Ranjan Gogoi (CJI), Sharad Bobde, D. Y. Chandrachud, Ashok Bhushan, Syed Abdul Nazeer

Case opinions
- Decision by: Joint opinion of 5 judges

The final judgement in the Ayodhya dispute was declared by the Supreme Court of India on 9 November 2019. The Supreme Court ordered the disputed land (2.77 acres) to be handed over to a trust (to be created by the government of India) to build the Ram Janmabhoomi (revered as the birthplace of Hindu deity, Rama) temple. The court also ordered the government to give an alternative 5 acres of land in another place to the Uttar Pradesh Sunni Central Waqf Board for the purpose of building a mosque as a replacement for the demolished Babri Masjid.

The verdict has also been the subject of scholarly debate, particularly regarding its implications for secularism and the rights of religious minorities in India.

== Background ==
=== Allahabad High Court verdict ===
A subsequent land title case was lodged in the Allahabad High Court, the verdict of which was pronounced on 30 September 2010. In the judgment, the three judges of the Allahabad High Court ruled that the 2.77 acres (1.12 ha) of Ayodhya land be divided into three parts, with 1/3 going to the Ram Lalla or Infant Rama represented by the Hindu Mahasabha, 1/3 going to the Uttar Pradesh Sunni Central Waqf Board, and the remaining 1/3 going to Nirmohi Akhara. The judgment affirmed that the disputed land was the birthplace of Rama as per evidence provided and that the Babri Masjid was built after the demolition of a Hindu temple, noting that it was not built in accordance with the tenets of Islam.

=== Title cases ===
In 1950, Gopal Singh Visharad filed a title suit with the Allahabad High Court seeking injunction to offer puja (worship) at the disputed site. A similar suit was filed shortly after but later withdrawn by Paramhans Das of Ayodhya. In 1959, the Nirmohi Akhara, a Hindu religious institution, filed a third title suit seeking direction to hand over the charge of the disputed site, claiming to be its custodian. A fourth suit was filed by the Uttar Pradesh Sunni Central Waqf Board for declaration and possession of the site. The Allahabad High Court bench began hearing the case in 2002, which was completed in 2010. After the Supreme Court of India dismissed a plea to defer the High Court verdict, on 30 September 2010, the High Court of Allahabad, the three-member bench comprising justices S. U. Khan, Sudhir Agarwal and D. V. Sharma, ruled that the disputed land be split into three parts. The site of the Ram Lalla idol would go to the party representing Ram Lalla Virajman (the installed Infant Rama deity), Nirmohi Akhara was to receive Sita Rasoi and Ram Chabutara, and the Uttar Pradesh Sunni Central Waqf Board to receive the rest. The court also ruled that the status quo should be maintained for three months. All the three parties appealed against the division of disputed land to the Supreme Court.

The Supreme Court held final hearing on the case from 6 August 2019 to 16 October 2019. On 9 November 2019, the Supreme Court ordered the land to be handed over to a trust (to be formed by the Government of India) to build the Hindu temple. It also ordered the government to give 5 acres of land to the Uttar Pradesh Sunni Central Waqf Board to build a mosque as a replacement for the demolished Babri Masjid.

== Restrictions imposed before judgement ==
For 15 days preceding the verdict, restrictions were imposed in Ayodhya to prevent violence. Security arrangements were increased across India. Thousands of paramilitary forces and police troops were deployed in Ayodhya and surveillance of the region was carried out using CCTV cameras and drones.

Internet services were closed in several places in Uttar Pradesh and Rajasthan, while it was announced that a total of 31 districts and 673 individuals were being closely monitored. Section 144 of the Code of Criminal Procedure of India was invoked in the entire state of Uttar Pradesh as well as in some major cities such as Bangalore, Bhopal, Jaipur, Lucknow, and Mumbai. A public holiday was declared for schools and colleges across the states of Jammu and Kashmir, Karnataka, Madhya Pradesh and Uttar Pradesh, as well as Delhi, on the day of the verdict. Security was stepped up across various towns in Telangana; 20,000 personnel deployed in Hyderabad, mainly around the communally sensitive areas of the Old City including the Charminar and Mecca Masjid. According to reports, around 40,000 police personnel were deployed in Mumbai and 15,000 in Chennai as a precautionary measure. The prime minister made a public request for maintaining peace and religious harmony.

== Summary of the verdict ==
The five-judge bench of the Supreme Court unanimously pronounced its verdict on 9 November 2019. The judgement can be summarised as follows.

- The Court ordered the government of India to create a trust to build the Ram Mandir temple and form a Board of Trustees within three months. The disputed land will be owned by the government of India and subsequently transferred to the Trust after its formation.
- The Court ordered the entire disputed land of area of 2.77 acres to be allocated for the construction of a temple while an alternative piece of land of area of 5 acres be allocated to the Uttar Pradesh Sunni Central Waqf Board for the construction of a mosque at a suitable place within Ayodhya.
- The Court ruled that the 2010 Allahabad High Court's decision, division of the disputed land was incorrect.
- The Court ruled that the Demolition of the Babri Masjid and the 1949 desecration of the Babri Masjid was in violation of law.
- The Court observed that archaeological evidence from the Archaeological Survey of India shows that the Babri Masjid was constructed on a religious"structure", whose architecture was distinctly indigenous and non-Islamic.
- On objections raised with regards to ASIs various scientific claims by the Muslim parties, the Supreme Court observed, the contesting parties could have raised it before the Allahabad High Court as there were legal remedies available for the same. The apex court of India also commented that the ASI report which was submitted on behalf of the Allahabad High Court was not an "ordinary opinion". At the same time, on The Historians report to the Nation authored by Aligarh historians and presented as an evidence, the court observed : "At the highest, this report can be taken as an opinion."
- The ruins of an ancient religious structure under an existing building do not always indicate that it was demolished by unfriendly powers, the Supreme Court held in its 1,045-page judgment in the Ayodhya case.
- The court observed that all four of the Janamsakhis (biographies of the first Sikh guru, Guru Nanak) state unambiguously and in detail that Guru Nanak made pilgrimage to Ayodhya and offered prayers in the Ram temple in 1510–11 CE. The court also mentioned that a group of Nihang Sikhs performed puja in the "mosque" in 1857.
- The Court said that Muslim parties, including the Uttar Pradesh Sunni Central Waqf Board, failed to establish exclusive possession of disputed land. It said that the Hindu parties furnished better evidence to prove that Hindus had worshipped continuously inside the mosque, believing it to be the birthplace of the Hindu deity Rama. The Court cited that iron railings set up in 1856–57 separated the inner courtyard of the mosque from the outer courtyard, and that Hindus were in exclusive possession of the outer courtyard. It said that even before this, Hindus had access to the inner courtyard of the mosque.
- The Court ruled that the suit filed by Nirmohi Akhara could not be upheld and it had no shebait rights. However, the court ruled that Nirmohi Akhara should be given appropriate representation in the board of trustees.
- The Court rejected the claim made by Shia Waqf Board against the Uttar Pradesh Sunni Central Waqf Board for the ownership of the Babri Masjid.

On 12 December 2019 the Supreme Court dismissed all the 18 petitions seeking review of the verdict.

== Domestic reactions ==
=== Parties to the dispute ===
The primary lawyer of the Muslim parties Zafaryab Jilani said that they were not satisfied with the verdict but added that the verdict also contained some "good examples". The Uttar Pradesh Sunni Central Waqf Board's lawyer, Zafaryab Jilani, "expressed dissatisfaction over the Supreme Court's Ayodhya verdict, saying it has a lot of contradictions and they will seek a review of it." Zufar Faruqi, chairman of the Uttar Pradesh Sunni Central Waqf Board, issued a statement saying that he accepted the verdict and declared that it will not submit a review petition for the same.

Jamiat Ulema-e-Hind, a litigant in the dispute, refused to accept the alternative site for a mosque ordered by the court.

All India Muslim Personal Law Board and Jamiat Ulema-e-Hind decided to file a review petition after rejecting the verdict on 17 November 2019.

=== Other religious figures ===
Prominent leaders from the Hindu and the Muslim communities extended their support to the Indian government in maintaining peace, after meeting with National Security Advisor Ajit Doval. The Shahi Imam of the Jama Masjid, Delhi supported the verdict, saying that the dispute should not continue further. Some major industrial bodies supported the decision.

=== Political parties and figures ===
Many political parties in India supported the judgement. The Bharatiya Janata Party (BJP) said the judgement will usher in peace and unity in India. The Indian National Congress supported the verdict and called for calm and peace. Political figures such as Delhi chief minister Arvind Kejriwal, Bihar chief minister Nitish Kumar, Madhya Pradesh chief minister Kamal Nath, and Dravida Munnetra Kazhagam leader M. K. Stalin supported the judgement. The Indian Prime Minister Narendra Modi tweeted about the decision saying that it should not be considered as win or loss for anybody. In a subsequent address to the nation, he said that there would be peace and unity and that all issues can be solved within the constitutional framework. All India Majlis-e-Ittehadul Muslimeen president Asaduddin Owaisi said that he was not satisfied with the judgement, calling it a victory of "faith over facts".

=== Other ===
Congress mouthpiece National Herald, published two articles criticizing the verdict. The editorial later withdrew the articles and issued an apology after facing criticism on social media and from the BJP. A few celebrities also expressed their opinion in support for the decision and called for harmony and peace. Some academic analyses have also examined the verdict in relation to tension between constitutional secularism and religious claims in India.

== Concerns of Sikh community ==
1045-page judgment referring to Sikhism as a 'cult' instead of a distinct sovereign religion and quoting accounts of Nihang Sikh worshiping idols which is totally prohibited in Sikhism, was condemned by Shiromani Gurdwara Parbandhak Committee, Delhi Sikh Gurdwara Management Committee, H. S. Phoolka and Sikhs. Dr. Manjit Singh Randhawa filed a petition in the Supreme Court seeking to expunge 'all distorted facts' in the verdict judgment and word 'cult' while referring to the Sikh religion.

== International reactions ==
The Indian Ministry of External Affairs briefed foreign envoys and diplomats about the verdict on 9 November 2019.

The Minister of Foreign Affairs of Pakistan, Shah Mehmood Qureshi, criticised the verdict and questioned its timing as it coincided with the inauguration of the Kartarpur Corridor. He called the court verdict an indication of the "bigoted ideology of Modi government".

== See also ==
- Ayodhya in Hinduism
- Shri Ram Janmabhoomi Teerth Kshetra
