= Ramchandra Paramhans =

Head of trust overseeing construction of Ram Mandir temple

Mahant Ramchandra Das Paramhans (1913–2003) was head of the Ram Janmabhoomi Nyas in Ayodhya. He was born as Chandreshwar Tiwari into a prosperous Brahmin family in what is now the Indian state of Bihar. After his death, Mahant Dharam Das succeeded him as his legal heir.
