= Ramnam Bank =

Spiritual banks dedicated to Rama

Ramnam Bank (or Ram Naam Bank)
- रामनाम बैंक
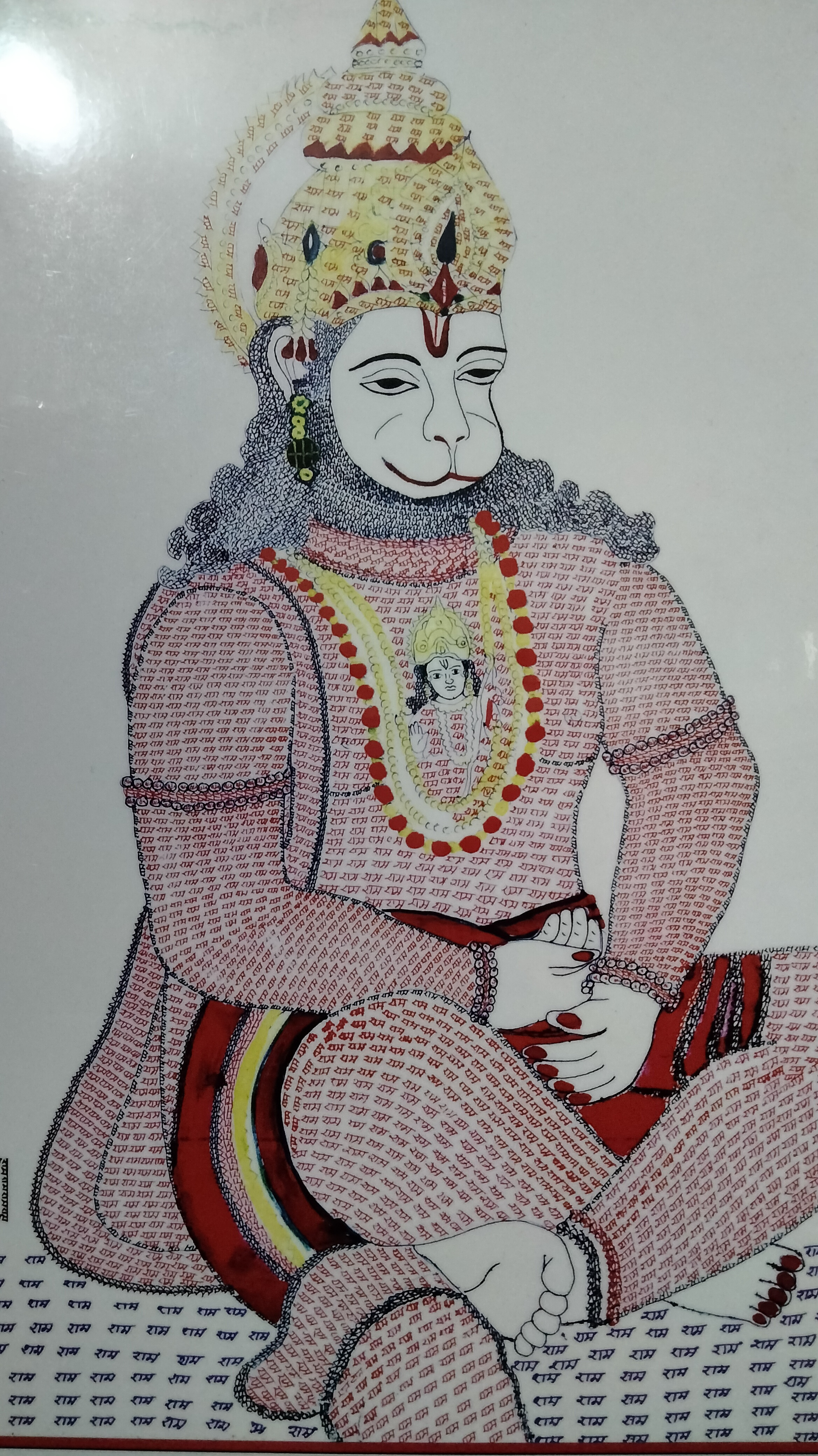
- Image of Hanuman made using Ramnam by a devotee of Rama

Religion
- Affiliation: Hinduism
- Deity: Rama

Location
- Location: Indian subcontinent
- Repository bank of Ramnam

Ramnam Bank (Hindi: रामनाम बैंक), also written as Ram Naam Bank, is a repository institution of Ramnam handwritten booklets. It is a spiritual bank that keeps deposits of Ramnams booklets written by devotees of Rama. It is a unique spiritual institution, primarily found in the Indian subcontinent, where devotees "deposit" booklets filled with the repeated writing of the name of Rama (or sometimes other deities). These Ram Naams are handwritten by devotees. It is not a traditional bank or financial institution and does not involve monetary transactions. Instead, the act of writing and depositing the sacred name of Rama is considered a spiritual practice for gaining merit and fostering devotion. It is a bank where faith is the currency and the divine name is the deposit.

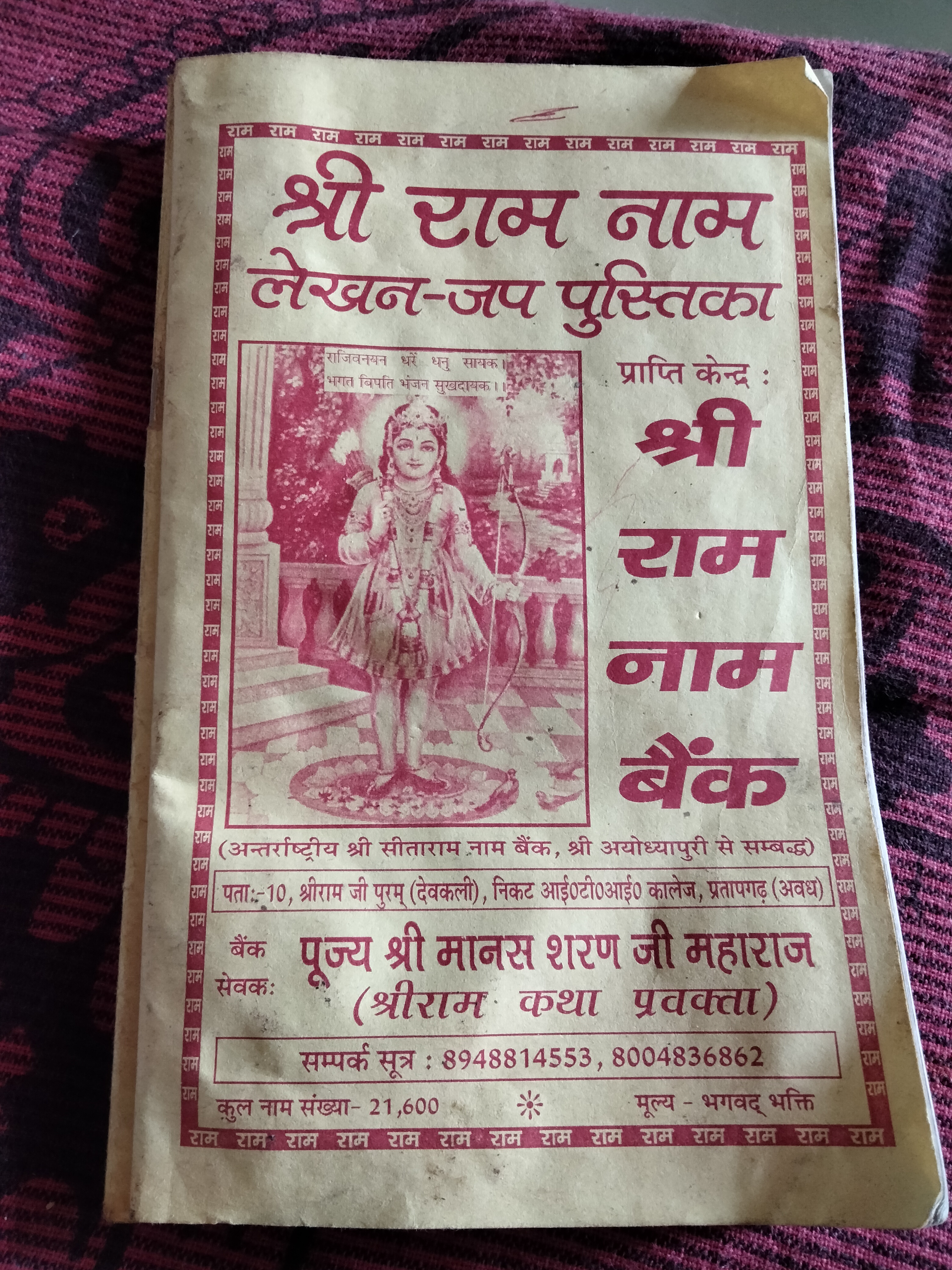
Sample of a Ramnam Bank's booklet

The Ramnam Bank is related to the tradition of Ramnam bhakti in Hinduism. In the tradition of Hinduism, Rama is a major deity, considered as the seventh avatar of Vishnu. Chanting or writing the name of Rama is considered as auspicious karma by Hindu adherents. It is an important part of Vaishnava sect in Hinduism. Some devotees choose the path of reciting Ramnam orally whereas some devotees choose the path of writing Ramnam on papers. The Ramnam Bank keeps a record of the number of Ramnams written by devotees.

== Etymology ==
Ramnam is combined Indic word having two terms Rama and Naam. The term Rama is the name of an avatar of Vishnu in Hinduism. Similarly, the term Naam means name. Thus the meaning of the combined term Ramnam is name of Rama. A general meaning of the term bank is a place or location where something is deposited. Thus the literal meaning of the Ramnam Bank is a bank of Rama's name.

== Concept and functioning ==
Unlike conventional banks that deal with monetary transactions, Ramnam Banks facilitate the deposit of booklets filled with the repeated writing of "Ram" or "Sita Ram." Anyone willing to write Rama's name can open an account without any monetary deposit. The bank provides booklets and sometimes red ink and a wooden pen. The booklet is also known as the passbook of the Ramnam Bank. The name of Rama is written only 108 times on each page of the passbook. The name Rama is considered as the currency of the bank. Some devotees come to Ramnam Bank with different wishes. The Ramnam Bank also provides the facility of loan of the Ramnams. After the fulfillment of the wishes, the borrower devotees have to return the loan of Ramnams with some interest. If a devotee takes a loan of one lakh Ramnams, then that devotee has to return minimum one and a half lakh Ramnams to the bank written on booklets or electronically.

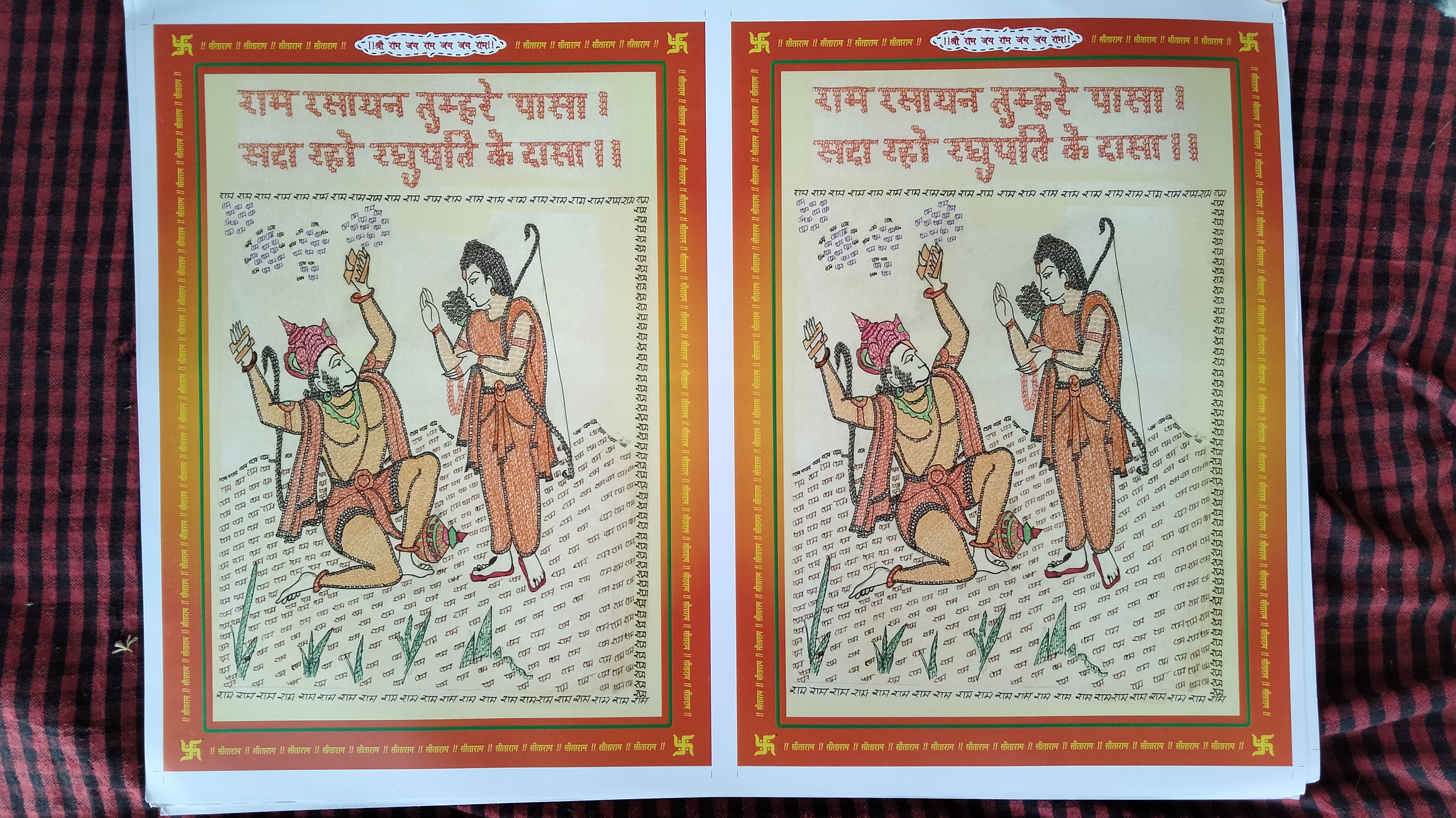
Ramnams artistic image

== Locations ==
In the Indian subcontinent, there are several locations where Ramnam Banks have been established. The Ramnam Bank located in the city of Prayagraj is a major location. Every year during the Maghi Mela, a camp office of this bank opens at the Sangam Nose in Prayagraj. It has inspired the Hindus of Indian origin living in Europe and America to open branches of the Ramnam Bank in their respective countries. Similarly, the Ramnam Bank at the Gautam Ashram in the Mithila region of Bihar is other major location. The Ramnam Bank of the Gautam Ashram is a pillar shaped approximately 27 feet high. It was established in the year 1967.

In the city of Varanasi, the Ramnam Bank is 98 years old. It is called here as Ram Ramapati Bank. It is run by Ashish Mehrotra. Similarly in the city of Ayodhya, the Ramnam Bank is located at the Valmiki Ramayan Bhawan in the campus of the Maniramdas Chhabani in Ayodhya. The Ramnam Bank of the Ayodhya city is named as Antarrashtriya Shree Sitaram Bank. It has a total of 150 branches in India and abroad.

In the city of Agra, a Ramnam Bank is being operated by Agra Pataka Seva Sansthan since the year 2000. It is connected to the Ramnam Bank located at Bichuna in Jaipur of Rajasthan. In 2021, a Ramnam Bank was opened at the Shree Raj Rajeshwari Shiva Mandir in the Patiala city of Punjab state. It is named as Shree Ram Nam Bank (SRNB).

== History ==
The concept of the Ramnam Bank is old, with some banks tracing their history back to the 1870s. The Ramnam Bank of Prayagraj was established in 1870. It was founded by the ancestors of Ashutosh Varshney. The bank is presently managed by Ashutosh Varshney. According to him, earlier our ancestors used to write the name of Lord Rama on Bhoj Patra. Later, the name of Rama was written on ledgers or papers.
