= Ayodhya dispute =

Historical controversy

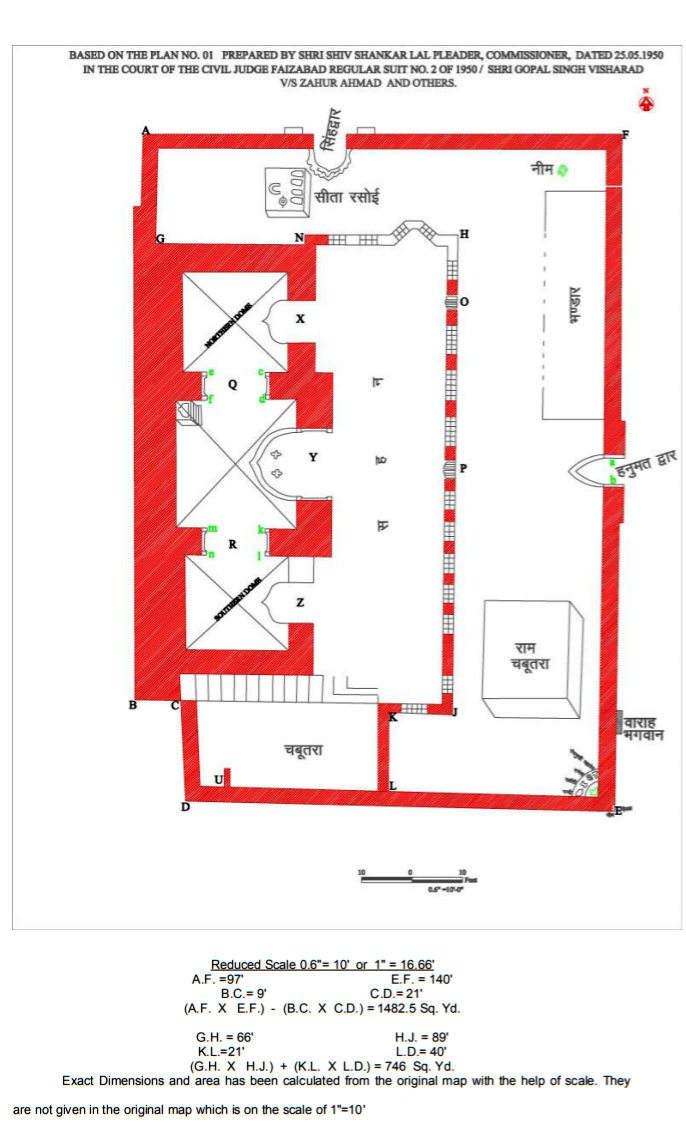
Ayodhya disputed site map

The Ayodhya dispute is a political, historical, and socio-religious debate in India, centred on a plot of land in the city of Ayodhya, Uttar Pradesh. The issues revolve around the control of a site regarded since at least the 18th century among many Hindus to be the birthplace of their deity Rama, the history and location of the Babri Masjid at the site, and whether a previous Hindu temple was demolished or modified to create the mosque, which was built around 1530.

The site of the Babri Masjid has been claimed to be the birthplace of Rama since at least 1822. Hafizullah, a superintendent at the Faizabad court submitted a report to the court in 1822 in which he claimed, "The mosque founded by emperor Babur is situated at the birth-place of Ram." In 1855 local Muslims became convinced that the nearby Hanuman Garhi Temple was built over the site of a former mosque, and became resolved to demolish the temple, resulting in violent clashes leading to the deaths of many Muslims. In 1857, a chabutra (platform) was erected in the courtyard of the Babri Masjid at the supposed site of Rama's birthplace. As a consequence of this dispute was a court case in 1885 requesting the construction of a temple to enclose the chabutra, considered to mark the birthplace of Rama, in the courtyard of the Babri Masjid, which was rejected by citing that Hindu side doesn't enjoy proprietary rights. This decision was appealed a year later and the Faizabad district court once again rejected it by "citing the passage of time" as the reason for rejection although the court agreed with the Hindu petitioner's claim by taking note that "It is most unfortunate that a masjid should have been built on land specially held sacred by the Hindus. But as that event occurred 356 years ago it is too late now to remedy the grievance." This was followed by Hindu riots in 1934 following a cow slaughter which damaged the Babri Masjid. In 1949 devotees of Rama placed idols dedicated to him in the mosque, and the structure was subsequently declared off-limits to Muslims.

The Babri Masjid was destroyed during a political rally on 6 December 1992 which has been acknowledged as a criminal offence by the Supreme Court; this triggered riots all over the Indian subcontinent. Many attempts were thwarted previously, one of which led to the 1990 Ayodhya firing incident. A subsequent land title case was lodged in the Allahabad High Court, the verdict of which was pronounced on 30 September 2010. In the judgment, the three judges of the Allahabad High Court ruled that the Ayodhya land be divided into three parts, with one third going to the Ram Lalla or Infant Rama represented by the Vishva Hindu Parishad, one third going to the Uttar Pradesh Sunni Central Waqf Board, and the remaining third going to Nirmohi Akhara, a Hindu religious denomination. While the three-judge bench found no evidence that the mosque was constructed after demolition of a temple, it did agree that a temple structure predated the mosque at the same site. The Archaeological Survey of India had conducted an excavation of the disputed site on the orders of the Allahabad High Court. The report of the excavation concluded that there were ruins of "a massive structure" beneath the ruins of the mosque which was "indicative of remains which are distinctive features found associated with the temples of north India", but found no evidence that the structure was specifically demolished for the construction of the Babri Masjid. The report received both praise and criticism, with some other archaeologists contesting the results of the report.

On 5 February 2020, the Government of India made an announcement for a trust named as Shri Ram Janmabhoomi Teerth Kshetra to reconstruct a Ram temple there. It also allocated an alternative site in Dhannipur, Ayodhya to build a mosque to replace the Babri Masjid that was demolished in 1992. On 22 January 2024, the Ram Mandir was officially opened. Prime Minister Narendra Modi led its consecration, claiming it to be the start of a new era. The temple is expected to be fully completed by July 2025.

== Religious background ==
The land on which the medieval mosque, Babri Masjid, stood has come to be regarded by Hindus to be the birthplace of the Hindu deity, Rama, and is at the core of the Ayodhya dispute.

=== Ram Janmabhoomi (Rama's birthplace) ===
Rama is one of the most widely worshipped Hindu deities and is considered the seventh incarnation of god Vishnu. According to the Ramayana, Rama was a prince born in the Ikshvaku dynasty's capital city Ayodhya (which may not be the same as modern Ayodhya) to parents Kaushalya and Dasharatha in the Treta Yuga.

The Ayodhya Mahatmya, described as a "pilgrimage manual" of Ayodhya, traced the growth of the sect in the second millennium CE. The original recension of the text, dated to the period between 11th and 14th centuries, mentions the janmasthana (birthplace) as a pilgrimage site. A later recension adds many more places in Ayodhya and the entire fortified town, labelled Ramadurga ("Rama's fort"), as pilgrimage sites. (Note: Scholar Hans T. Bakker has studied multilple surviving manuscripts of the Ayodhya Mahatmya and classified the recensions represented in them. He states that the text started as a "floating collection" of traditions from the 11th century onwards. The older recensions, which he calls "recension A" and "recension B", are believed to have been gathered between the 11th to 14th centuries, a version of which was included in the Skandapurana. A later recension, which he labels "recension OA", represents the continued growth of the Ramaite tradition in later periods, especially after the "outburst of extreme emotional devotion and enthusiasm" generated from the time of Chaitanya (1486–1533).)

=== Babri Masjid (Mosque of Babur) ===
Babur was the first Mughal emperor of India and the founder of the Mughal Empire. It is believed that one of his generals, Mir Baqi, built the Babri Masjid ("Babur's Mosque") in 1528 on his orders. The belief has been in currency since 1813–14, when the East India Company's surveyor Francis Buchanan reported finding an inscription on the mosque walls attesting to this fact. He also recorded the local tradition, which believed that emperor Aurangzeb (r. 1658–1707) built the mosque after demolishing a temple dedicated to Rama. However, between 1528 and 1668, no extant text mentions the presence of a mosque at this site. The earliest historical record of a mosque comes from Jai Singh II, a Rajput noble in the Mughal court, who purchased the land of the mosque and the surrounding area in 1717. His documents show a three-domed structure resembling the mosque, which is labelled the "birthplace" (chhathi). In the courtyard can be seen a platform (chabutra) to which Hindu devotees are shown circumambulating and worshipping. All these details were corroborated by the Jesuit priest Joseph Tieffenthaler half a century later. Tieffenthaler also said that "The reason for this is that once upon a time, here was a house where Beschan [Vishnu] was born in the form of Ram." Thus being the first to suggest that Babri Masjid had any proximity to a site associated with Rama's birth, according to historians' like R.S. Sharma.

The Baburnama, Babur's diary in which he meticulously documented his life, bears no mention of either the construction of a mosque in Ayodhya or the destruction of a temple for it (there is a known lacuna in his diary between 3 April and 17 September 1528, which period covers Babur's visit to Ayodhya); neither do his grandson Akbar's court documents, the Ain-i-Akbari, nor his contemporary Hindu poet-saint Tulsidas' epic poem Ramcharitmanas, dedicated to the Hindu god Rama.

Both Hindus and Muslims are said to have worshipped at the "mosque-temple": Muslims inside the mosque and Hindus outside the mosque but within the compound. In 1857, a British administrator erected a railing between the two areas in order to prevent disputes between the two communities. In 1949, following India's independence, an idol of Ram was placed inside the mosque, triggering the dispute.

== Historical background ==
=== Gupta period ===
In Buddha's time (600 BCE) the present-day Ayodhya was called Saketa and was one of the six largest cities of North India. During the Gupta times, either Kumaragupta or Skandagupta made it their capital, after which it came to be called Ayodhya. Kalidasa wrote Raghuvamsa here, and referred to Gopratara tirtha (Guptar Ghat), where Rama was believed to have entered the waters of Saryu in his ascent to heaven. According to a local tradition recorded by Francis Buchanan and Alexander Cunningham, Ayodhya became desolate after Rama's ascent to heaven and "Vikramaditya" revived it (whereas in Raghuvamsa, Rama's son Kusa revived it). Prabhavatigupta, the daughter of Chandragupta II, was a Rama devotee. Her son, Pravarasena II wrote Sethubandha, in which Rama is regarded as identical to Vishnu. He also built a temple to Rama at Pravarapura (Paunar near Ramtek) in about 450 CE.

=== Gahadavala period ===
After the Guptas, the capital of North India moved to Kannauj and Ayodhya fell into relative neglect. It was revived by the Gahadavalas, coming to power in the 11th century. The Gahadavalas were Vaishnavas. They built several Vishnu temples in Ayodhya, five of which survived until Aurangzeb's reign. Indologist Hans T. Bakker concludes that there might have been a temple at the supposed birth spot of Rama built by the Gahadavalas. (Note: Indologist Hans T. Bakker has named the five temples as follows: Vishnu Hari temple at the Chakratirtha ghat, Harismriti temple at the Gopratara ghat, Chandra Hari temple on the west side of the Svargadwara ghat, Dharma Hari temple on the east side of the Svargadwara ghat, and a Vishnu temple at the Ram Janmabhoomi site. One of these temples was swept away by the Sarayu river, the fate of another (Harismiriti temple) is unknown, but the other three were replaced by mosques, including the temple at the Janmabhoomi, according to Bakker.) In subsequent years, the cult of Rama developed within Vaishnavism, with Rama being regarded as the foremost avatar of Vishnu. Consequently, Ayodhya's importance as a pilgrimage centre grew. In particular, multiple versions of Ayodhya Mahatmya (magical powers of Ayodhya) prescribed the celebration of Ram Navami (the birthday of Rama).

=== Mughal period ===
In modern times, a mosque was located at the supposed birth spot of Rama, which sat on a large mound in the centre of Ayodhya, called the Ramadurg or Ramkot (the fort of Rama). The mosque bore an inscription stating that it was built in 1528 by Mir Baqi on the orders of Babur.

According to an early 20th-century text by Maulvi Abdul Ghaffar and the surrounding historical sources examined by historian Harsh Narain, (Note: Sources cited by Harsh Narain: Karim, Maulvi Abdul (1885). Tarikh-i Parnia Madinatul Awliya [History of Parnia city of Sufis] (in Persian). Lucknow.; Ghaffar, Maulvi Abdul (1981) [first published prior to 1932]. Gumgamashtah Halat-i Ajodhya [Forgotten Events of Ayodhya] (in Urdu). Lucknow: Nami Press.; Sita Ram, Avadh-vasi Lala (1932). Ayodhya ka Itihasa [History of Ayodhya] (in Hindi). Allahabad.) the young Babur came from Kabul to Awadh (Ayodhya) in disguise, dressed as a Qalandar (Sufi ascetic), probably as part of a fact-finding mission. Here he met the Sufi saints Shah Jalal and Sayyid Musa Ashiqan and took a pledge in return for their blessings for conquering Hindustan. The pledge is not spelled out in the 1981 edition of Abdul Ghaffar's book, but it is made clear that he ordered the construction of the Babri mosque after conquering Hindustan in order to fulfil this pledge. (Note: Ghaffar (1981), pp. 61–62 quoted in Narain, The Ayodhya Temple Mosque Dispute (1993), pp. 31–32) The original book was written in Persian by Maulvi Abdul Karim, a spiritual descendant of Musa Ashiqan, and it was translated into Urdu by Abdul Ghaffar, his grandson, with additional commentary. The older editions of Abdul Ghaffar's book contain more detail, which seems to have been excised in the 1981 edition. Lala Sita Ram of Ayodhya, who had access to the older edition in 1932, wrote, "The faqirs answered that they would bless him if he promised to build a mosque after demolishing the Janmasthan temple. Babur accepted the faqirs' offer and returned to his homeland." (Note: Sita Ram (1932), p. 151 quoted in Narain, The Ayodhya Temple Mosque Dispute (1993), p. 33 and Dharam Veer Sharma (2010), vol. 2, para. 17 (p. 281))

The fact that Babur came in the guise of a Qalandar is corroborated in Abdullah's Tarikh-i Dawudi, where it is detailed that he met the Sultan Sikandar Lodhi in Delhi in the same disguise. The inscription on the Babri mosque also names him as Babur Qalandar. Musa Ashiqan's grave is situated close to the Babri mosque site, whose shrine uses two of the same type of black basalt columns used in the Babri mosque, indicative of his role in the destruction of the prior temple.

Tulsidas, who began writing the Ramcharit Manas in Ayodhya on Rama's birthday in 1574 (coming there from his normal residence in Varanasi) mentioned the "great birthday festival" in Ayodhya but made no mention of a mosque at Rama's birthplace. Abu'l-Fazl ibn Mubarak (1551–1602), who wrote Akbarnama, completing the third volume Ain-i Akbari in 1598, described the birthday festival in Ayodhya, the "residence of Rama" and the "holiest place of antiquity", but made no mention of a mosque. William Finch, the English traveller who visited Ayodhya around 1611, and wrote about the "ruins of the Ranichand [Ramachand] castle and houses" where Hindus believed the great God "took flesh upon him to see the tamasha of the world." He found pandas (Brahmin priests) in the ruins of the fort, who were recording the names of the pilgrims, a practice that was said to go back to antiquity. Again there was no mention of a mosque in his account.

=== Late Mughal period ===
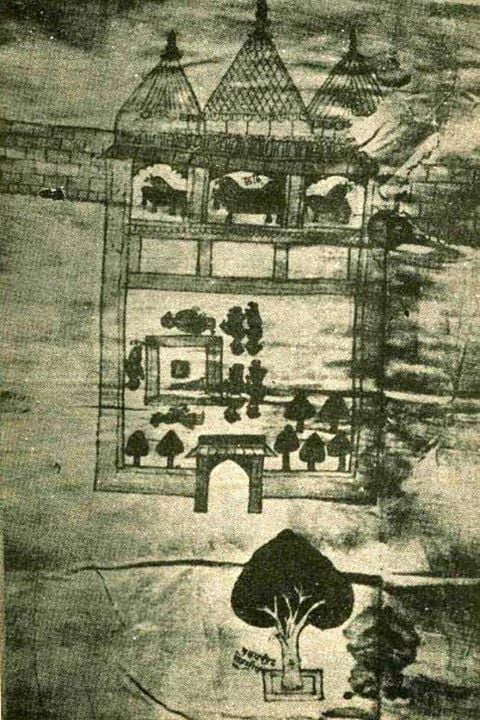
Map of Babri Masjid / Ram Janmasthan site from Jai Singh's collection (1717 CE)

The first known report of a mosque appears in a book Sahifa-I-Chihil Nasaih Bahadur Shahi, said to have been written by a daughter of the emperor Bahadur Shah I (1643–1712) and granddaughter of emperor Aurangzeb, in the early 18th century. It mentioned mosques having been constructed after demolishing the "temples of the idolatrous Hindus situated at Mathura, Banaras and Awadh etc." Hindus are said to have called these demolished temples in Awadh "Sita Rasoi" (Sita's kitchen) and "Hanuman's abode". While there was no mention of Babur in this account, the Ayodhya mosque had been juxtaposed with those built by Aurangzeb at Mathura and Banaras.

Jai Singh II (popularly called "Sawai Jai Singh", 1688–1743) purchased land and established Jaisinghpuras in all Hindu religious centres in North India, including Mathura, Vrindavan, Banaras, Allahabad, Ujjain and Ayodhya. The documents of these activities have been preserved in the Kapad-Dwar collection in the City Palace Museum in Jaipur. R. Nath, who has examined these records, concludes that Jai Singh had acquired the land of Rama Janmasthan in 1717. The ownership of the land was vested in the deity. The hereditary title of the ownership was recognized and enforced by the Mughal State from 1717. He also found a letter from a gumastha Trilokchand, dated 1723, stating that, while under the Muslim administration people had been prevented from taking a ritual bath in the Saryu river, the establishment of the Jaisinghpura has removed all impediments.

The Jesuit priest Joseph Tieffenthaler, who visited Awadh in 1766–1771, wrote, "Emperor Aurangzebe got the fortress called Ramcot demolished and got a Muslim temple, with triple domes, constructed at the same place. Others say that it was constructed by 'Babor'. Fourteen black stone pillars of 5 span high, which had existed at the site of the fortress, are seen there. Twelve of these pillars now support the interior arcades of the mosque." This ambiguity between Aurangzeb and Babur could be significant. (Note: Some scholars argue that whatever Babur constructed was abandoned and was in ruins by the time of Akbar, and Hindus continued to worship there. The mosque seen in present times must have been constructed by Aurangzeb.) Tieffenthaler also wrote that Hindus worshipped a square box raised 5 inches (13 cm) above the ground, which was said to be called the "Bedi, i.e., the cradle", and "The reason for this is that once upon a time, here was a house where Beschan [Vishnu] was born in the form of Ram." He recorded that Rama's birthday was celebrated every year, with a big gathering of people, which was "so famous in the entire India".

== Beginnings of dispute ==
The first recorded instances of religious violence in Ayodhya occurred in the 1855. Certain "Sunnis claimed that the Bairagis of Hanumangarhi had destroyed a mosque that existed atop it. The Muslims charged on the Hanumangarhi but were repelled and routed. They hid inside the mosque of Babur that lay at a distance of less than a kilometre from Hanumangarhi." The Babri mosque was attacked by Hindus in the process. Since then, local Hindu groups made occasional demands that they should have the possession of the site and that they should be allowed to build a temple on the site, all of which were denied by the colonial government.

In 1946, an offshoot of the Hindu Mahasabha called Akhil Bharatiya Ramayana Mahasabha (ABRM) started an agitation for the possession of the site. In 1949, Sant Digvijay Nath of Gorakhnath Math joined the ABRM and organised a 9-day continuous recitation of Ramcharit Manas, at the end of which the Hindu activists broke into the mosque and placed idols of Rama and Sita inside. On 22–23 December, idols were installed inside the mosque and the people were led to believe that the idols had 'miraculously' appeared in the monument.

Jawaharlal Nehru and Vallabhbhai Patel insisted that the idols should be removed, however, Govind Ballabh Pant was not willing to remove the idols and added that "there is a reasonable chance of success, but things are still in a fluid state and it will be hazardous to say more at this stage". By 1950, the state took control of the structure under section 145 CrPC and allowed Hindus, not Muslims, to perform their worship at the site. The mosque had been converted into a de facto temple. Both the Uttar Pradesh Sunni Central Waqf Board and the ABRM filed civil suits in a local court staking their respective claims to the site.

Christophe Jaffrelot has called the Gorakhnath wing of Hindu nationalism 'the other saffron', which has maintained its existence separately from the mainstream Hindu nationalism of the Sangh Parivar. After the Vishva Hindu Parishad (VHP) was formed in 1964 and started agitating for the Babri Masjid site, the two strands of 'saffron politics' came together. While the lawsuits continued in 1950s and 1960s, the Ayodhya dispute took a new shape in 1984 when the VHP carried out procession in Ayodhya, seeking "liberation" of the site from the mosque.

== Demolition of the Babri Mosque ==
In the 1980s, the Vishwa Hindu Parishad (VHP), belonging to the mainstream Hindu nationalist family Sangh Parivar, launched a new movement to "reclaim" the site for Hindus and to erect a temple dedicated to the infant Rama (Ramlala) at this spot. The Bharatiya Janata Party (BJP), formed in 1980 from the remnants of the Jana Sangh, became the political face of the campaign. In 1986, a district judge ruled that the gates would be reopened and Hindus permitted to worship inside, providing a major boost to the movement. In September 1990, BJP leader L. K. Advani began a "rath yatra" (pilgrimage procession) to Ayodhya to generate support for the movement. Advani later stated in his memoirs, "If Muslims are entitled to an Islamic atmosphere in Mecca, and if Christians are entitled to a Christian atmosphere in the Vatican, why is it wrong for the Hindus to expect a Hindu atmosphere in Ayodhya?" The yatra resulted in communal riots in many cities in its wake, prompting the government of Bihar to arrest Advani. In spite of this, a large number of 'Kar Sevaks' or Sangh Parivar activists reached Ayodhya and tried to attack the mosque. They were stopped by the Uttar Pradesh police and the paramilitary forces, resulting in a pitched battle in which several kar sevaks were killed. Accusing the central government led by V.P. Singh of being weak, the BJP withdrew its support, necessitating fresh elections. In these elections, the BJP won a majority in the Uttar Pradesh Legislative Assembly increased its share of seats in the Lok Sabha.

On 6 December 1992, the VHP and its associates, including the BJP, organised a rally involving 150,000 VHP and BJP kar sevaks at the site of the mosque. The ceremonies included speeches by the BJP leaders such as Advani, Murli Manohar Joshi and Uma Bharti. The mob grew restive through the duration of the speeches, and stormed the mosque shortly after noon. A police cordon placed there to protect the mosque was heavily outnumbered. The mosque was attacked with a number of improvised tools, and brought to the ground in a few hours. This occurred despite a commitment from the state government to the Indian Supreme Court that the mosque would not be harmed. More than 2000 people were killed in the riots following the demolition. Riots broke out in many major Indian cities including Mumbai, Bhopal, Delhi and Hyderabad.

On 16 December 1992, the Liberhan Commission was set up by the Government of India to probe the circumstances that led to the demolition of the Babri Mosque. It was the longest running commission in India's history with several extensions granted by various governments. The report found a number of people culpable in the demolition, including BJP leaders like Atal Bihari Vajpayee, Lal Krishna Advani, Murli Manohar Joshi, then Uttar Pradesh chief minister Kalyan Singh, Pramod Mahajan, Uma Bharti and Vijayaraje Scindia, as well as VHP leaders like Giriraj Kishore and Ashok Singhal. Other prominent political leaders indicted by the commission include late Shiv Sena chief Bal Thackeray and former RSS leader K. N. Govindacharya. Relying on the testimonies of several eyewitnesses, the report stated that many of these leaders had made provocative speeches at the rally that provoked the demolition. It also stated that they could have stopped the demolition if they had so wished.

Many Muslim organisations have continued to express outrage at the destruction of the disputed structure. In July 2005, terrorists attacked the makeshift temple at the site of the destroyed mosque. In 2007, M. N. Gopal Das, the then head of the Ram temple, received phone calls making threats against his life. Many terror attacks by banned jihadi outfits like Indian Mujahideen cited the demolition of Babri Mosque as an excuse for terrorist attacks.

== Post-independence ==
Several years later mosques were built in the Faizabad district, in which the pilgrim city of Ayodhya falls. Ayodhya itself has a small Muslim population, though there are substantial numbers of Muslims 7 km away at District Headquarters – Faizabad. Since 1949, by Indian Government order, Muslims were not permitted to be closer than 200 yards (180 m) away to the site; the main gate remained locked, though Hindu pilgrims were allowed to enter through a side door. The 1986 Allahabad High Court ordered the opening of the main gate and restored the site in full to the Hindus. Hindu groups later requested modifications to the Babri Mosque, and drew up plans for a new grand Temple with Government permissions; riots between Hindu and Muslim groups took place as a result, and the dispute became sub-judice. The political, historical and socio-religious debate over the history and location of the Babri Mosque, is known as the Ayodhya dispute.

=== Excavations ===
In 2003, by the order of an Indian High Court, the Archaeological Survey of India (ASI) was asked to conduct a more in-depth study and an excavation to ascertain whether the type of structure that was beneath the rubble indicated definite proof of a temple under the mosque. However, it could not be ascertained if it was a Rama temple, as the remnants had more resemblance to a Shiva temple. In the words of ASI researchers, they discovered "distinctive features associated with... temples of north India". Excavations further yielded:

stone and decorated bricks as well as mutilated sculpture of a divine couple and carved architectural features, including foliage patterns, amalaka, kapota-pali ["dove-house" crown-work], doorjamb with semi-circular shrine pilaster, broken octagonal shaft of black schist pillar, lotus motif, circular shrine having pranala (water chute) in the north and 50 pillar bases in association with a huge structure

One of the judges of the Allahabad High Court in 2010 criticised the independent experts who had appeared on behalf of the Uttar Pradesh Sunni Central Waqf Board including Suvira Jaiswal, Supriya Verma, Shireen F. Ratnagar and Jaya Menon. The witnesses withered under scrutiny and were discovered to have made "reckless and irresponsible kind of statements". He also pointed out that the independent witnesses were all connected, while adding that their opinions were offered without making a proper investigation, research or study into the subject.

Udit Raj's Buddha Education Foundation claimed that the structure excavated by ASI in 2003 was a Buddhist stupa destroyed during and after the Muslim invasion of India.

The excavations by the ASI were used as evidence by the court that there was a non-Islamic building before the mosque. However, the court concluded that no evidence was found that a non-Islamic structure was specifically demolished for the construction of the Babri Masjid.

Aligarh Historians Society has criticized both the ASI and the Allahabad High Court Judgement on several grounds. First, Justice Agarwal concluded that inscriptions on the Babri Masjid that attribute the Masjid to Babar are not genuine in favor of an omission in account by Fr. Joseph Tieffenthaler to conclude that Mir Baki does not exist and the mosque was constructed by Aurangzeb instead of Babur. However, omissions of this kind "are hardly every given credence" in history. Moreover, Justice Agarwal wrongly concludes that Mir Baqi is a fictional character because he could not find the person 'Mir Baqi Isfahani' or 'Mir Baqi' in Babur's Memoirs. Habib et al. (2010) argue that `Baqi Tashkandi` and `Baqi Shagawal` are the same person as `Mir Baqi` on the inscriptions. Similarly, ASI professionalism has been criticized for not tabulating the contrarian evidence like animal bones and glazed pottery in spite of explicit instructions from the courts. ASI has also been criticized for ignoring or selecting loose group of brickbats as pillar bases to support their theory of temple beneath the mosque.

=== Title cases ===
In 1950, Gopal Singh Visharad filed a title suit with the Allahabad High Court seeking injunction to offer 'puja' (worship) at the disputed site. A similar suit was filed shortly after but later withdrawn by Paramhans Das of Ayodhya. In 1959, the Nirmohi Akhara, a Hindu religious institution, filed a third title suit seeking direction to hand over the charge of the disputed site, claiming to be its custodian. A fourth suit was filed by the Uttar Pradesh Sunni Central Waqf Board for declaration and possession of the site. The Allahabad high court bench, comprising justices S. U. Khan, Sudhir Agarwal and D. V. Sharma, began hearing the case in April 2002, which it would complete by 2010. In 2003, the Archaeological Survey of India began a court-ordered survey to determine if a temple to Lord Rama existed on the site; the survey said there was evidence of a temple beneath the mosque, but this was disputed by Muslims. After the Supreme Court dismissed a plea to defer the High Court verdict, on 30 September 2010, the High Court of Allahabad, the three-member bench ruled that the disputed land be split into three parts. The site of the Ramlala idol would go to the party representing Ram Lalla Virajman (the installed Infant Ram deity), Nirmohi Akhara to get Sita Rasoi and Ram Chabutara, and the Uttar Pradesh Sunni Central Waqf Board to get the rest. The court also ruled that the status quo should be maintained for three months. All the three parties appealed against the division of disputed land in the Supreme Court.

== Supreme Court verdict ==
The Supreme Court (SC) held final hearing on the case from 6 August 2019 to 16 October 2019. The bench reserved the final judgment and granted three days to contesting parties to file written notes on 'moulding of relief' or narrowing down the issues on which the court is required to adjudicate.

The final judgement in the Supreme Court was declared on 9 November 2019. The Supreme Court ordered the land to be handed over to a trust to build the Hindu temple. It also ordered the government to give an alternate 2.0 hectares (5 acres) of land to the Uttar Pradesh Sunni Central Waqf Board for the purpose of building a mosque. The court has said in its verdict that the Nirmohi Akhara is not a shebait or devotee of the deity Ram Lalla and the Akhara's suit was barred by limitation.

The Supreme Court dismissed all 18 petitions seeking review of the verdict on 12 December 2019.

== Timeline ==
Year	Date	Event
1528		According to the inscription on its walls, the Babri Masjid constructed on orders of emperor Babur. Local tradition says it was built after demolishing (the ruins of) a temple at the birth spot of Rama.
1611		English merchant William Finch recorded Rama's castle and houses being visited by pilgrims.
1717		Rajput noble Jai Singh II purchased the land of the mosque and vested it in the deity. Hindus worship Rama idols outside the mosque.
1768		Jesuit priest Joseph Tieffenthaler witnessed the mosque and recorded the local tradition that it was built by Aurangzeb, while some said Babur built it.
1853		The first recorded communal clashes over the site date to this year.
1857 (or 1859)		The colonial British administration put a fence around the site, denominating separate areas of worship for Hindus and Muslims. That is how it stood for about 90 years.
1858	30 November	Syyed Muhammad who identified himself as Muezzin and Khatib of the Masjid Janmasthana filed a police complaint against a Nihang Sikh from Punjab. During British era, this event marked the first registered First information report related to Ayodhya dispute.
1885		The main priest of Hanuman Chabutra requested the Faizabad civil court's permission to build a temple in the Babri masjid's outer courtyard. The court rejected the petition citing lack of propreity by the petitioner.
1886		Appeal against the 1885 judgment was filed in the Faizabad district court. The British judge, Colonel F.E.A. Chamier rejected the plea citing passage of time as reason while observing, "It is most unfortunate that a masjid should have been built on land specially held sacred by the Hindus. But as that event occurred 356 years ago it is too late now to remedy the grievance....".
1949	December	Idols were placed inside the mosque. Both sides to the dispute filed civil suits. The government locked the gates, saying the matter was sub judice and declared the area disputed. The civil suits were filed for ownership of the Plot no 583 of the area.
1961		Case filed in Indian courts against forceful occupation of the Babri Mosque and placing of idols within it.
1984		The movement to build a temple at the site, which Hindus claimed was the birthplace of Lord Ram, gathered momentum when Hindu groups formed a committee to spearhead the construction of a temple at the Ramjanmabhoomi site.
1986		A district judge ordered the gates of the mosque to be opened after 37 years (see 1949 above) and allowed Hindus to worship inside the "disputed structure". A Babri Mosque Action Committee was formed as Muslims protested the move to allow Hindu prayers at the site. The gates were opened in less than an hour after the court decision.
1989		The clamour for building a Ram temple was growing. In February, VHP proclaimed that a Shila or a stone will be established for construction of temple near the area. In November, the Vishwa Hindu Parishad laid foundations of a temple on land adjacent to the "disputed structure" in presence of Home Minister Boota Singh and then Chief Minister ND Tiwari. There were sporadic clashes in the country such as Bhagalpur in Bihar.
1990		V P Singh became the Prime Minister of India with support of BJP which had won 58 seats in the election, a massive improvement from its last tally of 2 seats. The then BJP president Lal Krishna Advani took out a cross-country rathyatra to garner support for the move to build a Ram temple at the site. On 23 October, he was arrested in Bihar during the yatra, following which BJP took back its support to the government. Chandrashekhar became the Prime Minister of India with support of the Congress. On 30 October, many were gunned down by the police on orders of the then Uttar Pradesh Chief Minister Mulayam Singh Yadav, when they gathered in Ayodhya as participants of the Rath-Yatra; their bodies were thrown in the river Saryu.
1991		Congress came to power at center after elections in 1991, while BJP became major opposition party in center and came to power in many states such as Madhya Pradesh, Rajasthan, Himachal Pradesh and Uttar Pradesh. Kalyan Singh became the Chief Minister of Uttar Pradesh. State government acquired 1.12 hectares (2.77 acres) land in the area and gave it on lease to RamJanmBhoomi Nyas Trust. The Allahbad High Court stopped any permanent construction activity in the area. Kalyan Singh publicly supported the movement while Central Government took no action to curb the increasing tensions. In spite of the High Court judgement, disputed area was leveled.
1992		Kalyan Singh took steps to support the movement such as making entry into area easier, promising no firing on Karsevaks, opposing decision of central government to send Central Police force in the area, etc. In July, several thousand Karsevaks assembled in the area and the work for maintenance of temple started. This activity was stopped after intervention of the prime minister. Meetings started between Babri Masjid Action Committee and VHP leaders in presence of the home minister. On 30 October, Dharam Sansad of VHP proclaimed in Delhi that the talks have failed and Karseva will presume from 6 December. Central Government was considering the deployment of central police forces in the area and dissolution of state government but in the end decided against it. The case was being heard in the Supreme Court which told that State Government is responsible for ensuring law and order in the area. The government was discussing it in Cabinet Committee meeting and Rashtriya Ekta Parishad. BJP boycotted the Parishad. The Allahbad High Court was hearing the matter of legality of structure of foundation laid in 1989.
1992	6 December	The Babri Mosque was demolished by a gathering of near 200,000 Karsevaks. Communal riots across the Indian subcontinent followed.
1992	16 December	Ten days after the demolition, the Congress government at the centre, headed by PV Narasimha Rao, set up a commission of inquiry under Justice Liberhan.
1993		Three months after being constituted, the Liberhan Commission began investigations into who and what led to the demolition of the Babri Mosque.
2003		The court ordered a survey to find out whether a temple to Lord Ram existed on the site. In August, the survey presented evidence of a temple under the mosque. Muslim groups disputed the findings.
2003	September	A court ruled that seven Hindu leaders, including some prominent BJP leaders, should stand trial for inciting the destruction of the Babri Mosque.
2004	November	An Uttar Pradesh court ruled that an earlier order which exonerated LK Advani for his role in the destruction of the mosque should be reviewed.
2007		The Supreme Court refused to admit a review petition on the Ayodhya dispute.
2009		The Liberhan Commission, which was instituted ten days after the demolition of the Babri Mosque in 1992, submitted its report on 30 June – almost 17 years after it began its inquiry. Its contents were not made public.
2010	30 September	The Allahabad High Court pronounces its verdict on four title suits relating to the Ayodhya dispute on 30 September 2010. Ayodhya land to be divided into three parts. One third goes to Ram Lalla represented by Hindu Maha Sabha, one third to Uttar Pradesh Sunni Central Waqf Board, one third goes to Nirmohi Akhara.
2010	December	The Akhil Bharatiya Hindu Mahasabha and Uttar Pradesh Sunni Central Waqf Board moved to the Supreme Court of India, challenging part of the Allahabad High Court's verdict.
2011	9 May	Supreme Court of India stayed the High Court order splitting the disputed site in three parts and said that status quo will remain.
2019	6 August	The 5-judge Constitution bench, headed by Chief Justice Ranjan Gogoi, of Supreme Court started final hearing on the case.
2019	16 October	Final hearing in the Supreme Court ends. The bench reserved the final judgment. The bench granted three days to contesting parties to file written notes on 'moulding of relief' or narrowing down the issues on which the court is required to adjudicate.
2019	9 November	Final judgment delivered. The Supreme Court ordered the land to be handed over to a trust to build the Ram temple. It also ordered the government to give 2.0 hectares (5 acres) of land inside Ayodhya city limits to the Uttar Pradesh Sunni Central Waqf Board for the purpose of building a mosque.
2019	12 December	All petitions seeking review of the verdict dismissed by the Supreme Court.
2020	5 February	The Government of India made an announcement for a trust to build a Ram temple there. It also allocated an alternative site in Dhannipur, Ayodhya to build a mosque to replace the demolished Babri Masjid.
2024	22 January	Ram Mandir is inaugurated by Narendra Modi. Modi announces, "Ram is the faith of India, Ram is the foundation of India, Ram is the idea of India, Ram is the law of India. Ram is the prestige of India, Ram is the glory of India...Ram is the leader and Ram is the policy."

== See also ==
- Communalism (South Asia)
- Conversion of non-Islamic places of worship into mosques
- Ram ke Naam – a documentary on the Ayodhya dispute by Anand Patwardhan
- Temple Mount – similarly disputed location in Jerusalem

== Sources ==
- Sharma, Dharam Veer (30 August 2010). "Judgement in OOS No. 4 of 1989 (Decision of Hon'ble Special Full Bench hearing Ayodhya Matters)". Allahabad High Court. Archived from the original on 27 August 2014.
- Garg, Abhinav (12 November 2019). "How Guru Nanak played a 'role' in Ayodhya verdict". The Times of India. Archived from the original on 28 September 2020.
- Bacchetta, Paola (2000). "Sacred Space in Conflict in India: The Babri Masjid Affair". Growth and Change. 31 (2): 255–284. Bibcode:2000GroCh..31..255B. doi:10.1111/0017-4815.00128.
- Bakker, Hans (1982), "The rise of Ayodhya as a place of pilgrimage", Indo-Iranian Journal, 24 (2): 103–126, doi:10.1163/000000082790081267, S2CID 161957449
- Bakker, Hans T. (1984). Ayodhya, Part I: The History of Ayodhya from the 7th century BC to the middle of the 18th century. Institute of Indian Studies, University of Groningen. OCLC 769116023.
- Bakker, Hans (1991), "Ayodhya: A Hindu Jerusalem", Numen, vol. 38, no. 1, pp. 80–109, JSTOR 3270005
- Jain, Meenakshi (2013), Rama and Ayodhya, New Delhi: Aryan Books, ISBN 978-8173054518
- Jha, Krishna; Jha, Dhirendra K. (2012). Ayodhya: The Dark Night. HarperCollins India. ISBN 978-93-5029-600-4.
- Kunal, Kishore (2016), Ayodhya Revisited, Prabhat Prakashan, ISBN 978-81-8430-357-5
- Lal, B. B. (2008). Rāma, His Historicity, Mandir, and Setu: Evidence of Literature, Archaeology, and Other Sciences. Aryan Books. ISBN 978-81-7305-345-0.
- Layton, R.; Thomas, P. (2003). "Introduction". In Layton, R.; Stone, P.; Thomas, J. (eds.). Destruction and Conservation of Cultural Property. Routledge. pp. 1–21. ISBN 978-1-134-60497-5.
  - Lal, B. B. (2003). "A note on the excavations at Ayodhya with reference to the Mandir-Masjid issue". In Layton, R.; Stone, P.; Thomas, J. (eds.). Destruction and Conservation of Cultural Property. Routledge. pp. 117–126. ISBN 978-1-134-60497-5.
  - Sharma, Ram Sharan (2003). "The Ayodhya issue". In R. Layton; P. Stone; J. Thomas (eds.). Destruction and Conservation of Cultural Property. Routledge. pp. 127–138. ISBN 978-1-134-60497-5.
- Narain, Harsh (1993). The Ayodhya Temple Mosque Dispute: Focus on Muslim Sources. Delhi: Penman Publishers.
- Nath, R. (1990). Babari Masjid of Ayodhya. Jaipur: The Historical Research Documentation program.
- Ratnagar, Shereen (April 2004). "Archaeology at the Heart of a Political Confrontation: The Case of Ayodhya" (PDF). Current Anthropology. 45 (2): 239–259. doi:10.1086/381044. JSTOR 10.1086/381044. S2CID 149773944. Archived (PDF) from the original on 7 August 2020.
- van der Veer, Peter (1987). "'God must be Liberated!' A Hindu Liberation Movement in Ayodhya". Modern Asian Studies. 21 (2): 283–301. doi:10.1017/s0026749x00013810. JSTOR 312648. S2CID 69004346.
- van der Veer, Peter (1989). Gods on Earth: The Management of Religious Experience and Identity in a North Indian Pilgrimage Centre. Oxford University Press. ISBN 978-0-485-19510-1.
- van der Veer, Peter (1992). "Ayodhya and Somnath: Eternal Shrines, Contested Histories". Social Research. 59 (1): 85–109. JSTOR 40970685.
- van der Veer, Peter (1994), Religious Nationalism: Hindus and Muslims in India, University of California Press, ISBN 978-0-520-08256-4, archived from the original on 31 December 2023
