= Indo-Islamic Cultural Foundation =

Indian organization

Indo–Islamic Cultural Foundation
- Abbreviation: IICF
- Formation: 2019; 7 years ago
- Headquarters: 403, forth floor, Burlington Square, Vidhan Sabha Marg, Lucknow
- Website: iicfindia.com

The Indo-Islamic Cultural Foundation was founded in 2019 as an order of the Supreme Court in the Babri Masjid title dispute case. There will be 15 members on the trust. The trust was to build Ayodhya Mosque, Dhannipur, and community facilities including a hospital, a community kitchen, and an Indo-Islamic cultural research centre, which will include a museum at a 5-acre plot at Dhannipur village, District Ayodhya.

== Project ==
IICF proposed an architectural plan on 19 December 2020 in Lucknow. Apart from the mosque, there is a provision for a 200+ bed hospital, a museum, and a community kitchen to serve free meals to undernourished and malnourished children and women. Construction began on 26 January 2021. The mosque was officially named as Ahmadullah Shah Mosque, as an honour to the leader of Indian Independence war of 1857, Maulavi Ahmadullah Shah, but was later renamed as Mohammed Bin Abdullah Masjid.
