= Baqi Tashqandi =

Mughal commander believed to have built the Babri Masjid

Baqi Tashqandi, also known as Mir Baqi, was a Mughal Empire commander (baig) originally from Tashkent (in modern Uzbekistan) during the reign of the first Mughal emperor Babur. He is often associated with serving as the governor of the province of Awadh and is traditionally credited with overseeing the construction of the Babri Mosque in Ayodhya in 1528, which later became the focal point of the Ayodhya dispute.

== Identity ==
Baburnama (Chronicle of Babur) mentions a commander called Baqi Tashkindi (Baqi of Tashkent). His name also appears with other suffixes: Baqi Shaghawal, Baqi Beg (commander) or Baqi Mingbashi (commander of a thousand troops). However, the chronicle does not describe him as a Mir (prince or noble). Police officer-turned-scholar Kishore Kunal believes that the appellation "Mir Baqi" was constructed in 1813–1814 in a forged inscription on Babri Masjid for the benefit of the British surveyor Francis Buchanan, and there was in fact no prince called "Mir Baqi" in Babur's regime. (Note: Kunal, Ayodhya Revisited (2016, p. 142): "However, during Buchanan's survey of Gorakhpur during 1813-14 he was caught in a well-knit trap of forged inscriptions which indicated that the mosque was built by Mir Baqi at the behest of Babur.")

== Career ==
Baqi Tashqandi served as a commander in the Mughal force of Emperor Babur.

In 932 AH (January or February 1526 AD), Baqi, described as "Shaghawal", was given Dibalpur in Punjab as a fief (near Lahore), and sent to help quell a rebellion in Balkh. After his return, Baqi appears to have been assigned as a commander in a force of six or seven thousand troops headed by Chin-Timur Sultan. In 934 AH (1528 AD) the force was sent on an expedition to Chanderi. The enemy fled and Chin-Timur Sultan was ordered to pursue them. The subordinate commanders were given instructions "not to go beyond this [Sultan's] word".

In March 1528, the same force headed by Chin-Timur Sultan was sent in pursuit of Afghan nobles Bāyazīd and Biban (formerly in the employ of Ibrahim Lodi) near Awadh. The duo however took control of Lucknow by May 1529 (935 AH), signalling a loss for the Mughal force. The defeat was attributed to Baqi, who was possibly in charge of the Mughal fort in Lucknow. Babur sent reinforcements under the command of Kuki and others. Bāyazīd and Biban fled at the news of reinforcements. However, Baqi and his team could not catch hold of them. The temporary loss of Lucknow to the rebels as well as Baqi's inability to capture them annoyed Babur. The monsoon had set in and the horses needed rest. So Babur called a halt to the pursuit. On 13 June, Baqi called on Babur, who was apparently dissatisfied, and, on 20 June 1529, Babur dismissed Baqi (issued rukhsat) along with the army of Awadh that he was commanding. (Note: Kunal, Ayodhya Revisited (2016, Chapter 6): Beveridge's translation of the Baburnama states that Babur gave leave to Baqi. Thankston translated it as "that afternoon Baqi Shigavul and the Oudh aramy were dismissed". Erskine translated it as, "I gave Baqi Sheghawel and his party leave to go home".) No more is known of Baqi Tashqandi until his mysterious reappearance on a supposed inscription on the Babri Masjid as "Mir Baqi", as reported by the British East India Company's surveyor in 1813.

== Babri Masjid inscriptions ==
Francis Buchanan (also called Buchanan-Hamilton) did a survey of the Gorakhpur Division in 1813–14 on behalf of the British East India Company. Buchanan's report, never published but available in the British Library archives, states that the Hindus generally attributed destruction of temples "to the furious zeal of Aurangzabe [Aurangzeb]", but the large mosque at Ayodhya (now known as Babri Masjid) was ascertained to have been built by Babur by "an inscription on its walls". Buchanan had the said inscription in Persian copied by a scribe and translated by a Maulvi friend. The translation however showed two inscriptions. The first inscription said that the mosque was constructed by 'Mir Baqi' in the year 935 AH or 923 AH. (Note: Kunal, Ayodhya Revisited (2016, Chapter 5): "By order of King Babur whose justice is a building reaching to the mansions of heaven, this alighting place of the angels was erected by Meer Baquee a nobleman impressed with the seal of happiness. This is lasting Charity in the year of its construction what declares in manifest "that good works are lasting." [The anagram "good works are lasting" represented the year 935.] "From the Tughra: There is no God but God, and Mohammad is the Prophet of God. Say, O'Mohammad, that God is one, that God is holy, unbegetting and unbegotten, and that he hath no equal.") The second inscription narrated the genealogy of Aurangzeb. (Note: Kunal, Ayodhya Revisited (2016, Chapter 5): "The victorious lord, Mooheyoo Din, Aulumgir, Badshah, the destroyer of infidels, the son of Shah Juhan, the son of Juhangeer Shah; the son of Ukbar Shah; the son of Humayoon Shah, the son of Babur Shah; the son Oomer Sheikh Shah; the son of Soolatan Uboo Saeed; the son of Soolatan Moohammad Shah; the son of Meeran Shah, the son of Shaib-i-Qiran Meer Tymoor." "From the Tughra: In the name of God, most merciful I testify that there is no God but God. He is one, and without equal. I also testify that Mohammad is his Servant and Prophet." "Upon the propitious date of this noble erection, by this weak slave Moohummud Funa Ullah.") (Note: Kunal, Ayodhya Revisited (2016, Chapter 5): In addition to the two inscriptions and their monograms (turghas), a fable concerning a dervish called Musha Ashiqan was also included. The translator doubted that the fable was part of the inscription but recorded that the scribe "positively says that the inscription was executed at the erection of this building".) The translator had a difficulty with the anagram for the date, because one of the words was missing, which would have resulted in a date of 923 AH rather than 935 AH. These incongruities and mismatches made no impression on Buchanan, who maintained that the mosque was built under the orders of Babur.

The Babri Masjid stands at a location believed by Hindus to be the birthplace of Rama. There are no inscription records of a mosque at the site till 1672 and no known association with Babur or Mir Baqi prior to Buchanan's discovery of these inscriptions in the 19th century. The Baburnama does not mention either the mosque or the destruction of a temple. The Ramcharit Manas of Tulsidas (AD 1574) and Ain-i Akbari of Abu'l-Fazl ibn Mubarak (AD 1598) made no mention of a mosque either.It has been claimed to be mentioned in doha shatak attributed to Tulsidas but no such authentic work of him exists and this is considered a hoax.

In 1611, an English traveller William Finch visited Ayodhya and recorded the "ruins of the Ranichand [Ramachand] castle and houses". He made no mention of a mosque. In 1634, Thomas Herbert described a "pretty old castle of Ranichand [Ramachand]" which he described as an antique monument that was "especially memorable". However, by 1672, the appearance of a mosque at the site can be inferred because Lal Das's Awadh-Vilasa describes the location of birthplace without mentioning a temple. In 1717, the Moghul Rajput noble Jai Singh II purchased the land surrounding the site and his documents show a mosque.

Kishore Kunal states that all the claimed inscriptions on the Babri mosque were fake. They were affixed sometime around 1813 (almost 285 years after the supposed construction of the mosque in 1528 AD), and repeatedly replaced. In a petition filed by Syed Mohammad Asghar, the Mutawalli (guardian) of the Babri Masjid, with the Commissioner of Faizabad in 1877, it was stated that the word "Allah" above the door was the only inscription. The inscription mentioned by Buchanan was apparently not in evidence. In 1889, archaeologist Anton Führer recorded two inscriptions. One said that the mosque was erected by a noble 'Mir Khan' of Babur. (Note: Kunal, Ayodhya Revisited (2016, p. 168): 1. By the order of Babur, the king of the world; 2. This firmament-like, lofty; 3. Strong building was erected; 4. By the auspicious noble Mir Khan; 5. May ever remain such a foundation; 6. And such a king of the world.) Another said that the mosque was founded in the year 930 AH by a grandee of Babur, who was (comparable to) "another King of Turkey and China". (Note: Kunal, Ayodhya Revisited (2016, p. 169): 1. In the name of God, the merciful, the clement.; 2. In the name of him who...; may God perpetually keep him in the world.; 3. ....; 4. Such a sovereign who is famous in the world and in person of delight for the world.; 5. In his presence one of the grandees who is another King of Turkey and China.; 6. Laid this religious foundation in the auspicious Hijra 930.; 7. O God! May always remain the crown, throne and life with the king.; 8. May Babar always pour the flowers of happiness; may remain successful.; 9. His counsellor and minister who is the founder of this fort masjid.; 10. This poetry, giving the date and eulogy, was written by the lazy writer and poor servant Fath-allah-Ghori, composer.) The year 930 AH corresponds 1523 AD, three years before Babur's conquest of Hindustan. Moreover, the texts of these inscriptions were completely different from those documented by Buchanan.

== See also ==
- Babur
- Babri Mosque
- Ram Janmabhoomi

== Bibliography ==
- Jain, Meenakshi (2013). Rama and Ayodhya. New Delhi: Aryan Books. ISBN 978-8173054518.
- Kunal, Kishore (2016), Ayodhya Revisited, Prabhat Prakashan, ISBN 978-81-8430-357-5
- Narain, Harsh (1993). The Ayodhya Temple Mosque Dispute: Focus on Muslim Sources. Delhi: Penman Publishers.
