= Muhammad bin Abdullah Masjid =

Mosque to be built in Ayodhya, Uttar Pradesh, India

Muhammad bin Abdullah Masjid (Ayodhya Mosque)
- Location of the planned mosque in Uttar Pradesh

Religion
- Affiliation: Sunni Islam (not consecrated)
- Ecclesiastical or organisational status: Mosque (not consecrated)
- Governing body: Indo-Islamic Cultural Foundation
- Status: Planned; as of September 2024, construction not commenced
- Predecessor: Babri Masjid

Location
- Location: Dhannipur, Ayodhya district, Uttar Pradesh
- Country: India
- Coordinates: 26°45′43″N 82°00′07″E

Architecture
- Architect: Imran Shaikh
- Type: Mosque architecture
- Style: Indo-Islamic (when complete)
- Funded by: Uttar Pradesh Government (land); Uttar Pradesh Sunni Central Waqf Board; Donations: 40% by Hindus; 30% by Muslims; 30% Corporates
- Groundbreaking: 26 January 2021
- Construction cost: ₹300 crore (estimated)

Specifications
- Interior area: 4,500 square metres (48,000 sq ft) (complex)
- Dome: One (when complete)
- Minaret: Five (when complete)
- Site area: 2.0 ha (5 acres)

The Muhammad bin Abdullah Masjid, also known as the Ayodhya Mosque, is a planned Sunni mosque, not commenced, that is to be located in Dhannipur, in the Ayodhya district of the state of Uttar Pradesh, India. The site was designated by the Supreme Court of India following its verdict on the Ayodhya dispute case that allocated land previously used for a mosque to be used for a Hindu temple.

The construction of the mosque and associated complex is managed by the Indo-Islamic Cultural Foundation (IICF) trust. The proposed mosque is almost 22 kilometres (14 mi) away from the Ram Mandir, a Hindu temple, the former site of its predecessor, the Babri Masjid. Dhannipur is a hamlet located in Sohawal tehsil.

As of September 2026, construction of the mosque had not commenced.

== Construction ==
The project was formally launched by the Uttar Pradesh Sunni Central Waqf Board by hoisting the national flag and planting saplings on Republic Day of 2021. In addition to the mosque, the complex is planned to include a hospital, museum, library, a community kitchen which can feed a maximum of 2,000 people per day, and an Indo-Islamic cultural research centre and publication house.

A groundbreaking ceremony for the planned mosque was held on 26 January 2021. The planned mosque was officially named as Ahmadullah Shah Mosque, as an honour to the leader of Indian Independence war of 1857, Maulavi Ahmadullah Shah, but was later renamed in honour of the Islamic prophet Muhammad.

An initial futuristic design by S. M. Akhtar, without domes or minarets, was rejected in 2023, and Imran Shaikh became the project architect. His design blended traditional Indo-Islamic architecture, including a dome and five minarets, with modern building styles. In September 2024 it was reported that construction had not commenced due to lack of funds and community antipathy towards the proposed mosque. The IICF sought to have restrictions lifted so that it could receive donations from overseas, restricted by the Foreign Contribution Regulation Act.

Construction of the mosque, 300-bed hospital, museum, library, and associated facilities is estimated to cost ₹300 crore. Around 40% of the donations received by the Trust were given by Hindus, while Muslims contributed 30%. The remaining 30% are corporate donations. The Trust secretary, Athar Hussain, confirmed that as of November 2022 the Trust had received ₹40 lakhs in donations.

The Indo-Islamic Cultural Foundation (IICF), having provided all required documentation to the central government for Foreign Contribution Regulation Act (FCRA) approval, anticipates a favorable decision by the end of the year or early 2026.

== Controversies ==
=== Sharia permissibility disagreement ===
The All India Muslim Personal Law Board has stated that the construction of the mosque is against the Waqf Act and is not permissible under Sharia law. AIMIM chief Asaduddin Owaisi also claimed that donating money for construction and praying at the mosque is haram (forbidden) according to Islamic principles, to which the Mosque Trust replied that "serving humanity is not haram".

=== Ownership dispute ===
Two sisters from Delhi filed a petition in the Lucknow bench of Allahabad High Court, claiming ownership of the land allotted for the mosque along with 11 hectares (28 acres) of surrounding land, which they claim was given to their father at the time of partition.

== See also ==
- Islam in India
- List of mosques in India
- Indo-Islamic Cultural Foundation
