= Ayodhya firing incident =

On 30 October and 2 November 1990, security forces in Uttar Pradesh opened fire on kar sevaks (volunteer activists) who had converged on the Babri Masjid in Ayodhya, during an agitation led by the Vishwa Hindu Parishad and its Sangh Parivar affiliates to demolish the mosque and erect a temple to the Hindu deity Rama on the site. The official death toll across both days was 15, though the VHP claimed to have identified 59 victims.

== Background ==
In the 1980s, the Vishwa Hindu Parishad (VHP) and its Sangh Parivar affiliates began an agitation to demolish the Babri Masjid, and erect a temple to the Hindu deity Rama on the site, which many Hindus regard as his birthplace and, before the mosque's construction, the location of a temple devoted to his worship. To this end, BJP president L. K. Advani announced, on 12 September 1990, a rath yatra, a ceremonial chariot procession, that would travel approximately 10,000 kilometres from the holy city of Somnath to Ayodhya, beginning on 25 September. On 23 October, Advani was placed in preventive custody by the government of Bihar, and the government of Uttar Pradesh, under Chief Minister Mulayam Singh Yadav, ordered the arrest of all activists travelling towards Ayodhya, detaining some 150,000 individuals. Nonetheless, a large number of kar sevaks succeeded in reaching the city (estimates range from 40,000 to 75,000), where the state government had deployed 20,000 security personnel around the mosque.

== Events ==
On 30 October 1990, the day scheduled by the VHP for kar seva, Uttar Pradesh police had barricaded the 1.5 kilometre approach to the disputed structure and a curfew was in force. At around 11 AM, a sadhu seized control of an Armed Constabulary bus being used to detain kar sevaks and drove it through the barricades, enabling a crowd of approximately 5,000 kar sevaks to storm the heavily guarded site on foot. Security forces, caught off guard, initially deployed tear gas to disperse the crowd; however, when a group of kar sevaks succeeded in climbing the dome of the mosque and raising a saffron flag, the police, acting under orders from the Mulayam Singh Yadav government not to allow any damage to the structure, opened fire with live ammunition.

On 2 November, a crowd of approximately 15,000 kar sevaks, led by first time BJP MP Uma Bharti, VHP Joint Secretary Ashok Singhal, and RSS affiliated Swami Vamdeo, converged on the same junction. Journalists present on the rooftops reported that the police opened fire without warning; the firing ceased only after foreign journalists attempted to cross the police cordon into the affected area. The state government subsequently relented, opening road and rail routes into Ayodhya and permitting kar sevaks to enter the disputed structure in batches to offer prayers. The official death toll across both days of firing was 15, but the VHP stated that it had identified 59 victims. Some newspapers made "sensational claims" of 100 kar sevaks being shot.

== Aftermath and legacy ==
Urns containing the ashes of kar sevaks killed in the firing were carried across the country by the VHP in Asthi Kalash Yatras. Comparing the event to the Jallianwala Bagh massacre, the National Council of the Bhartiya Janata Party adopted a resolution stating that the "blood of Ram-Bhatkas shall not go in vain". J.K. Jain's studios produced cassettes dealing with the bloody police action against the kar sevaks, their sales ran into the thousands.

The order to fire upon the kar sevaks earned Mulayam Singh Yadav the title of "Mullah Mulayam". In 2016, he expressed regret over his orders, stating that the decision was "needed to keep the faith of Muslims in this country intact". However, in 2017, he defended the orders and added, "If more people were required to be killed for the country’s unity and integrity, security forces would have done it."

A petition filed by Vishnu Shankar Jain on behalf of his client Rana Sangram Singh to have an FIR registered against him was rejected by the Supreme Court of India in 2019.

The sister of the Kothari brothers, who were among those killed in the firing, was invited to the inauguration of the Ram Mandir in 2024.
