= Dhannipur =

Pilgrim Village of Uttar Pradesh, India

- Village
- Location within Uttar Pradesh Location within India
- Country: India
- State: Uttar Pradesh
- Division: Ayodhya
- District: Ayodhya

Government
  - Type: Municipal Corporation

Language
  - Official: Hindi
  - Additional official: Urdu
  - Regional: Awadhi
- Time zone: UTC+05:30 (IST)
- PIN(s): 224135
- Area code: +91-5278
- Vehicle registration: UP-42
- Website: ayodhya.nic.in

Dhannipur is a village in Ayodhya district of Uttar Pradesh, India. In February 2020, the government allotted 5 acres (2.0 ha) of agricultural land at Dhannipur in Ayodhya municipal corporation to the Uttar Pradesh Sunni Central Waqf Board as an alternative site for constructing a mosque, to replace the Babri Masjid that was demolished in 1992. The Babri Masjid, after being re-built is now known as the Mohammed Bin Abdullah Masjid.

== Places of interest ==
Ayodhya Mosque is being planned in Dhannipur village, Ayodhya district, Uttar Pradesh, at the Supreme Court of India designated site following the verdict related to the Ayodhya dispute case. The construction of the Mosque and associated complex is under the Indo-Islamic Cultural Foundation.

== See also ==
- Mohammed Bin Abdullah Masjid
- Indo-Islamic Cultural Foundation
