= Ram Nath =

Indian historian

Ram Nath (R. Nath, born 9 March 1933) is an Indian historian who specializes in Mughal architecture. He obtained a doctorate from the Agra University, and later taught at the University of Rajasthan. He is regarded as one of India's leading art historians.

== Life and career ==
R. Nath was born on 9 March 1933, grew up in a syncretic environment of Agra. He later recalled that, in his childhood period, Hindus and Muslims lived together in the same neighbourhoods, went to the same schools and participated in each other's festivals.

Nath studied in the St. John's College in Agra and obtained PhD and DLitt from the Agra University. His research covered the Mughal-era monuments such as the Agra Fort, the buildings at Fatehpur Sikri, and the Jama Masjid of Delhi.

Nath taught at the Agra College and later at the University of Rajasthan in Jaipur where he was a Reader and associate professor in the Department of History and Indian Culture. He also delivered lectures at other institutions including the Heras Institute (St. Xavier's College, Mumbai) and the Harvard University. Specializing in medieval Indian architecture, Nath came to be regarded one of India's leading art historians and an authority on the Mughal architecture.

== Views ==
In 1990, in the context of the Ayodhya dispute, the All India Babri Masjid Action Committee (AIBMAC) cited Nath's History of Mughal Architecture to argue that the Islamic Mughal rulers did not destroy a Hindu temple to build the Babri mosque in Ayodhya. When Nath learned about this from an Indian Express newspaper report, he clarified that he actually believed that the mosque had been built over a temple. He explained his position in a booklet titled Architecture & Site of the Baburi Masjid of Ayodhya, stating that a Jami Masjid is always sited in the main bazar of a city where the faithful can congregate conveniently and make purchases in the market afterwards. The Babri Masjid is on the other hand sited on a high mound in the midst of a series of Hindu temples in an exclusively Hindu locality. There would have been no reason to site a mosque at that location unless it was built on top of a demolished temple.

In 2015, when a group of 53 academics criticised the BJP-led Narendra Modi government for fostering an environment of intolerance in the country on behalf of Hindu nationalists, Nath was among the 46 academics who disagreed with them. Nath and his colleagues branded the first group of academics as "leftist", and stated that their letter was politico-ideological rather than intellectual in nature. They asserted that they rejected the nationalist attempts to portray India's past as glorious golden age, but also condemned the "leftist" historians for promoting contempt of Indian civilisation.

In 2017, when the Uttar Pradesh chief minister and BJP leader Yogi Adityanath reportedly stated that the Mughal-built Taj Mahal was not a part of Indian culture, Nath denounced him for "ignoring the contribution of [the] Mughal rulers to Indian arts, culture and literature". Nath also criticised the BJP leader Sangeet Som's claim that Taj Mahal was built by "traitors": he asserted that the monument's builder Shah Jahan was an Indian emperor, who defended India against foreign invasions, promoted the Indian languages Sanskrit and Hindavi over Arabic, and who liberally patronised Indian poets, musicians, and painters. He further pointed out that the monument was built by Indian artisans, using Indian material and Indian techniques. Nath rejected the claims that Shah Jahan had forcibly acquired the land from Hindu king Jai Singh to build the monument, and that hands of 20,000 artisans involved in its construction were amputated. He also criticised the Hindu chauvinist theory that Taj Mahal was originally a Shiva temple, calling it "absolutely wrong and absurd". He stated that the Hindu nationalist characterisation of the Mughal era as "exploitative, barbaric and a period of incomparable intolerance" was completely wrong.

== Works ==
According to the University of Washington Libraries, R. Nath has authored "65 books, 13 monographs, 190 research-papers and 300 popular articles." The books written by him include the following:

- R. Nath (2018). Islam in India: Predicaments of the Indian Musalman. Ajmer: The Heritage.
- R. Nath (2004). Mughal Inlay Art. Indian History and Culture Society. ISBN 978-81-246-0261-4.
- R. Nath (2004). काल-दर्पण (Kala-Darpana) (in Hindi). Delhi: Parimal.
- R. Nath (2004). Indigenous Characteristics of Mughal Architecture. Indian History and Culture Society. ISBN 978-81-246-0256-0.
- R. Nath (2000). Fatehpur Sikri and Its Monuments. Historical Research Documentation Programme. ISBN 978-81-85105-28-4.
- R. Nath (1999). Chittorgadh Kīrtti-stambha of Maharana Kumbha: The Idea & the Form, 1440-60 A.D. Abhinav. ISBN 978-81-7017-358-8.
- R. Nath (1997). Mughal Sculpture: Study of Stone Sculptures of Birds, Beasts, Mythical Animals, Human Beings, and Deities in Mughal Architecture. A.P.H. Publishing Corporation. ISBN 978-81-7024-870-5.
- R. Nath (1996). India as Seen by Babur, AD 1504-1530. M.D. ISBN 978-81-7533-000-9.
- R. Nath (1996). Art & Architecture of the Taj Mahal. Historical Research Documentation Programme. ISBN 978-81-85105-25-3.
- R. Nath (1995). Studies in Medieval Indian Architecture. M.D. ISBN 978-81-85880-56-3.
- R. Nath (1995). Medieval Indian History and Architecture. APH Publishing Corporation. ISBN 978-81-7024-697-8.
- R. Nath (1994). Jaina kirtti-stambha of Chittorgadh, c. 1300 A.D.: the form & the idea. Historical Research Documentation Programme. ISBN 9788185105222.
- R. Nath (1994). Private life of the Mughals of India, 1526–1803 A.D. Historical Research Documentation Programme. ISBN 978-81-85105-20-8.
- R. Nath (1994). Mosque Architecture: From Medina to Hindustan, 622-1654 A.D. Historical Research Documentation Programme. ISBN 978-81-85105-23-9.
- R. Nath (1991). Architecture & Site of the Baburi Masjid of Ayodhya: (a Historical Critique). Historical Research Documentation Programme. ISBN 978-81-85105-14-7.
- R. Nath, ed. (1990). India as Seen by William Finch (1608-11). Historical Research Documentation Programme. ISBN 978-81-85105-12-3.
- R. Nath (1989). Historiographical Study of Indo-Muslim Architecture: Medieval Architecture of India and Pakistan. Historical Research Documentation Programme. ISBN 978-81-85105-10-9.
- R. Nath (1986). Jharokha: An Illustrated Glossary of Indo-Muslim Architecture. Historical Research Documentation Programme.
- R. Nath (1986). Elements of Indian Art and Architecture. Historical Research Documentation Programme. ISBN 978-81-85105-07-9.
- R. Nath (1985). The Taj Mahal & Its Incarnation. Historical Research Documentation Programme. ISBN 9780318369754.
- R. Nath (1984). Antiquities of Chittorgadh. Historical Research Documentation Programme.
- R. Nath (1982). History of Mughal Architecture (5 volumes). Abhinav. ISBN 978-81-7017-414-1.
- R. Nath (1982). Islamic architecture and culture in India. B.R. ISBN 9780865901353.
- R Nath (1981). India As Seen by Amir Khusrau (1318 A.D). The Heritage. ISBN 978-81-85105-00-0.
- R. Nath (1980). Art of Khajuraho. South Asia Books. ISBN 978-0-8364-0608-5.
- R. Nath (1979). Calligraphic Art in Mughal Architecture. Iran Society.
- R. Nath (1979). The Art of Chanderi: A Study of the 15th Century Monuments of Chanderi. Ambika.
- R. Nath (1978). History of Sultanate architecture. Abhinav. ISBN 9788170170730.
- Sir Sayyid Ahmad Khan (1978). Athar'al-Sanadid [Monuments of Delhi: A historical study]. Translated by R. Nath. Ambika. ISBN 9780836405835.
- R. Nath (1977). Agra and Its Monumental Glory. Taraporevala.
- R. Nath (1976). History of Decorative Art in Mughal Architecture. Motilal Banarsidass. ISBN 9780836404135.. To be reprinted under the title Motifs and Designs of Mughal Architecture.
- R. Nath (1976). Some Aspects of Mughal Architecture. Abhinav. ISBN 9788170170365.
- R. Nath (1973). मध्यकालीन भारतीय कलाएँ एवं उनका विकास (Madhyakālīna Bhāratīya kalāe evaṃ unakā vikāsa) (in Hindi). Rajasthan Hindi Granth Akadmi.
- R. Nath (1972). The Immortal Taj Mahal: The Evolution of the Tomb in Mughal Architecture. D. B. Taraporevala Sons.
- R. Nath (1970). Colour Decoration in Mughal Architecture. D. B. Taraporevala Sons.
