= 2005 Ram Janmabhoomi attack =

Terrorist attack in Ayodhya, India

- Location: Ram Janmabhoomi, Ayodhya, Uttar Pradesh, India
- Date: 5 July 2005
- Target: Ram Janmabhoomi
- Attack type: Suicide car bombing, mass shooting, terrorist attack
- Weapons: VBIED, AK-47s, Type 56 assault rifles, carbines, M1911 pistols, M67 grenades
- Deaths: 8 (2 civilians and 6 militants)
- Perpetrator: Lashkar-e-Taiba
- No. of participants: 6
- Defenders: CRPF, UP Police, UP PAC
- Convictions: Life sentence
- Convicted: 4

On 5 July 2005, six militants from the Pakistan-based Islamist organisation Lashkar-e-Taiba attacked the makeshift temple to the Hindu deity Rama that stood at the site of the destroyed Babri Mosque in Ayodhya, Uttar Pradesh, India. Five of the militants were shot dead in the ensuing gunfight with the Central Reserve Police Force (CRPF); the other blew himself up in an explosive-laden jeep during a grenade attack that his accomplices had launched to breach the cordoned wall. The attack killed two residents of the area. Seven members of the CRPF were injured: two suffered serious injuries with multiple gunshot wounds.

== Attack ==
Following the demolition of the Babri Masjid in 1992, a makeshift temple had been constructed in the city of Ayodhya. According to local Hindu beliefs, the site is the birthplace of the Hindu deity Rama. The site is therefore claimed by both Hindus and Muslims. On 5 July 2005, the heavily guarded complex was attacked by six armed militants. The militants were from the Pakistani Islamist militant organisation Lashkar-e-Taiba (LeT). The attack was foiled by security officials and all of the attackers were killed. According to the Special Task Force of the Uttar Pradesh Police, LeT had previously targeted the disputed site five times since 2000, including Hanuman Garhi in 2001 with a car bomb which failed to explode and in 2002, 2003 and 2004 when the militants were preemptively captured.

The militants and were believed to have entered India through Nepal. They posed as pilgrims on their way to Ayodhya, and boarded a Tata Sumo at Akbarpur, near the Kichaucha village in Ayodhya District. Then, in nearby Faizabad, they abandoned the Sumo and hired a Mahindra Marshall jeep driven by a driver, Rehan Alam Ansari. According to a statement by the driver, the militants visited a Ram temple in Ayodhya, where they prayed, possibly to reinforce the impression that they were pilgrims. The militants then drove the jeep into the site, and forced the driver out of the vehicle, banging the jeep against the security cordon. One attacker killed himself in the jeep by detonating it, damaging the surrounding structures at the site and the security fence. At 9:05 am, they hurled M67 grenades to breach the cordon. Ramesh Chandra Pandey, a pilgrim guide who happened to be near the site at this moment, died on the spot as a result of the grenade blast. Firing indiscriminately, the five remaining militants entered the "Mata Sita Rasoi". Returning the gunfire, a platoon of 35 Central Reserve Police Force (CRPF) soldiers killed all five of the militants in a gunfight that lasted for over an hour. Three CRPF soldiers also received serious injuries and, as of July 2008, two remain comatose. All the militants died within 70 metres of the site. Two local residents were killed in the attack, including guide Pandey and bystander Shanti Devi. Strict precautions were taken all over India to protect minorities wherever retaliatory killings were anticipated.

== Investigation ==
The investigating team tracked the phone calls made from the cell phones carried by the militants using the IMEI numbers. The Uttar Pradesh Police recovered a single RPG-7 rocket-propelled grenade launcher, five Type 56 assault rifles, five M1911 pistols, several M67 grenades and some jihadi documents. Rehan Alam, the jeep driver, was detained by the police for further investigations. The killed militants were buried in the Takiya graveyard in the neighbouring city of Faizabad.

On 28 July 2005, four Muslim men from Jammu and Kashmir – Akbar Hussain, Lal Mohammad, Mohmmad Naseer and Mohmmad Rafeeq – were arrested in connection with the attack. On 3 August 2005, another four Muslim men – Irfan, Ashiq Iqbal alias Farooque, Shakeel Ahmed and Mohammad Naseem – were arrested and eventually sentenced to life term imprisonment and fined Rs. 40,000 each; a fifth man, Mohammad Aziz, was acquitted. One of the victims' sons, dissatisfied with the acquittal, appealed to the government to intervene.
