= William Finch (merchant) =

English merchant in India (died 1613)

William Finch (died 1613) was an English merchant in the service of the East India Company (EIC). He travelled to India along with Captain Hawkins during the reign of the Mughal emperor Jehangir. The two of them attended on the emperor at the Mughal court and established trade relations between England and India. Finch subsequently explored various cities in India and left a valuable account of them in his journal, which was subsequently published.

== Career ==
Finch was a native of London. He was the agent to an expedition sent by the East India Company, under Captains Hawkins and Keeling, in 1607 to treat with the "Great Mogul", i.e., the Mughal Emperor, which was emperor Jahangir at that time. Hawkins' party landed at Surat on 24 August 1608. It was violently opposed by the Portuguese. Finch, however, obtained permission from the governor of Cambay to dispose of the goods in their vessels. Incited by the Portuguese, who seized two of the English ships, the locals refused to have dealings with the Company's representatives. During these squabbles Finch fell ill, and Hawkins proceeded to Agra alone, and obtained favourable notice from the emperor Jehangir. Finch recovered, and joined Hawkins at Agra on 14 April 1610. The two remained at the Mughal court for about a year and a half. Finch refused tempting offers to attach himself permanently to the service of Jehangir.

Hawkins returned to England, but Finch delayed his departure in order to make further explorations, visiting Byana and Lahore among other places. Finch made careful observations on the commerce and natural products of the districts visited. In 1612 the Moghul emperor confirmed and extended the privileges he had promised to Finch and Hawkins. The East India Company set up their first little factory at Surat that year.

== Exploration ==
Finch explored various cities in India, including Delhi, Ambala, Sultanpur, Ayodhya and Lahore, and left valuable accounts of these places in his diary. He intended to return to Europe overland, but died en route in Baghdad in 1612 probably due to infected water. His belongings were saved and returned to the East India Company. Reverend Samuel Purchas found Finch's journal in the archives of the company and published an abridged version of it as a chapter in his "Pilgrimes".

In Ayodhya, Finch was an early witness to the location of Ramkot ("Rama's fort"), the site of the present day Ram Janmabhoomi dispute. Finch did not describe a birthplace or mention a mosque in the area. (Note: A mosque at the location is witnessed in modern times and called "Babri Masjid", based on the belief that it was constructed by a general of Babur. Finch's non-recognition of a mosque at the location throws doubt on this belief.) However he did mention ruins that were thought to be Rama's castle and houses. The castle was four hundred years old, according to Finch. Regarding the "houses", Finch wrote:

Heere are also the ruines of Ranichand[s] castle and houses, which the Indians acknowled[g]e for the great God, saying that he tooke flesh upon him to see the tamasha of the world. In these ruines remayne certaine Brahmenes, who record the names of all such Indians as wash themselves in the river running thereby.

Scholar Hans T. Bakker, who made a detailed study of Ayodhya, takes Finch's account to be an authentic record of the state of the Ramkot area at that time.

== Bibliography ==
- Hans T. Bakker (1984). Ayodhya. Institute of Indian Studies, University of Groningen. OCLC 769116023.
- Layton, Robert; Thomas, Julian, eds. (2003), Destruction and Conservation of Cultural Property, Routledge, ISBN 9781134604982
- Kunal, Kishore (2016), Ayodhya Revisited, Prabhat Prakashan, ISBN 978-81-8430-357-5
