= Babri Masjid =

Destroyed mosque in Ayodhya, Uttar Pradesh, India

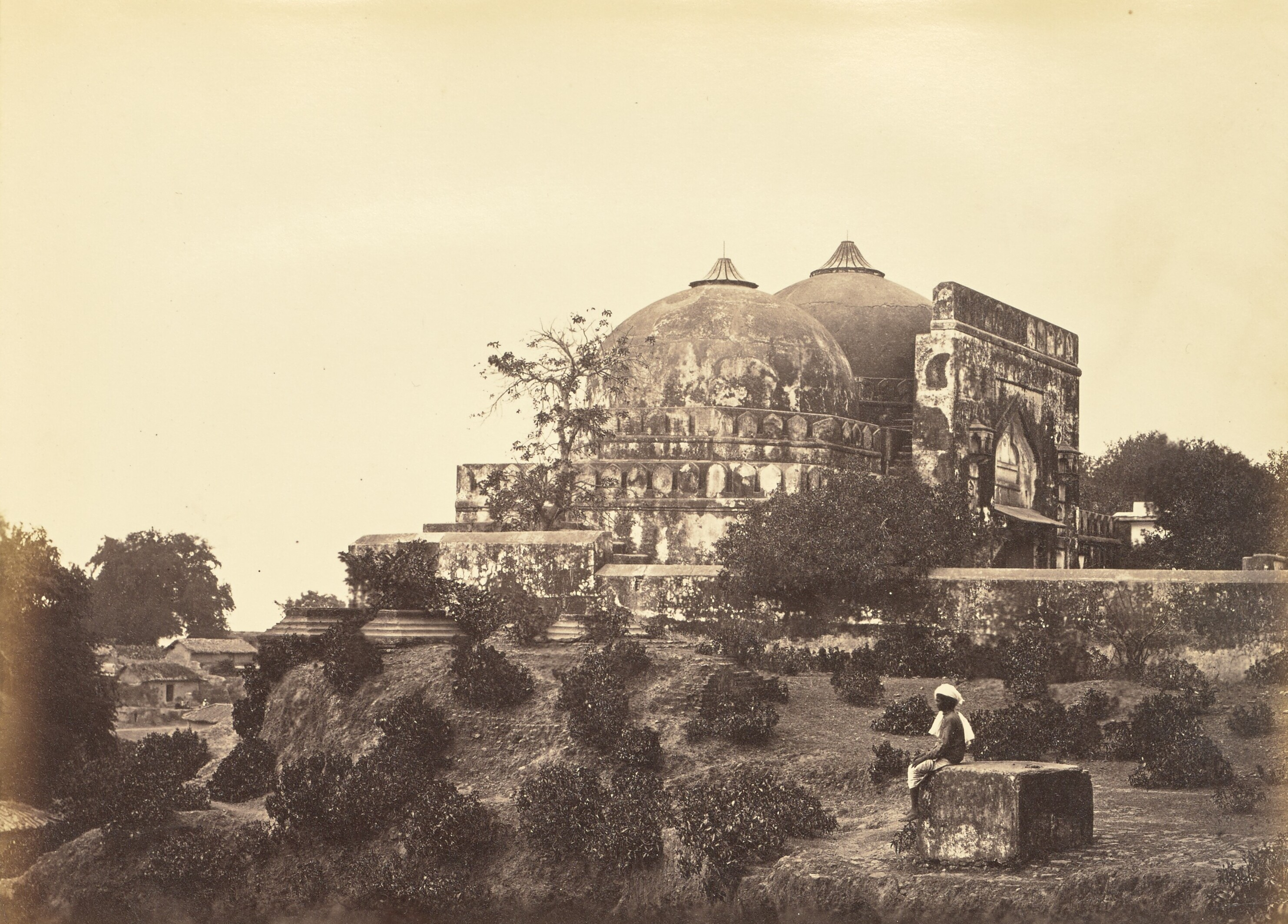
- 19th century photo by Samuel Bourne

- Location of the former mosque in Uttar Pradesh

Religion
- Affiliation: Islam
- Ecclesiastical or organisational status: Mosque (16th century–1992); Muhammad bin Abdullah Masjid (planned)
- Governing body: Uttar Pradesh Sunni Central Waqf Board
- Status: Demolished

Location
- Location: Ayodhya, Ayodhya district, Uttar Pradesh
- Country: India
- Coordinates: 26°47′44″N 82°11′40″E

Architecture
- Type: Mosque architecture
- Style: Tughlaq
- Creator: Mir Baqi
- Funded by: Babur
- Established: 935 AH (1528/1529 CE)
- Demolished: 6 December 1992 in the Demolition of the Babri Masjid

The Babri Masjid (ISO: Bābarī Masjida; meaning Mosque of Babur) was a mosque located in Ayodhya, in the state of Uttar Pradesh, India. According to the mosque's inscriptions, it was built in 935 AH (1528/1529 CE) by Mir Baqi, a commander of the Mughal emperor Babur. The mosque was attacked and demolished by a Hindu nationalist mob in 1992, which ignited communal violence across the Indian subcontinent.

The Babri Masjid site has been disputed between the Hindu and Muslim communities since the mid-19th century. In 1949, a group of Hindus placed idols of Rama and Sita inside the mosque, after which the government locked the building to avoid further disputes. Court cases were filed by both Hindus and Muslims asking for access. On 6 December 1992, a large group of Hindu activists belonging to the Vishva Hindu Parishad and allied organisations demolished the mosque, triggering riots all over the Indian subcontinent, resulting in the death of around 2,000–3,000 people.

In September 2010, the Allahabad High Court upheld the claim that the mosque was built on the spot believed to be Rama's birthplace and awarded the site of the central dome for the construction of a Rama temple. Muslims were also awarded one-third area of the site for the construction of a mosque. The decision was subsequently appealed by all parties to the Supreme Court, with a five judge bench delivering its judgment 9 November 2019, which quashed the lower court's judgement and ordered the entire site to be handed over to a trust to build the Hindu temple. It also ordered the government to give an alternative plot to the Uttar Pradesh Sunni Central Waqf Board to replace the Babri Masjid that had been demolished in 1992..

The government allotted a site in the village of Dhannipur, in Ayodhya District, 18 kilometres (11 mi) from Ayodhya City and 30 kilometres (19 mi) by road from the site of the original Babri Masjid. The great breaking ceremony for the mosque was held on 26 January 2021. In September 2024 it was reported that construction of the mosque had not commenced due to lack of funds and community antipathy towards the proposed mosque.

== Etymology ==
The name "Babri Masjid" comes from the name of the Mughal emperor Babur. Although many say that Babur ordered its construction., experts agree that Mir Baqi, Babur's general, did so. Before the 1940s, it was called Masjid-i Janmasthan ("mosque of the birthplace") including in official documents.

== Architecture ==
=== Background ===
The rulers of the Delhi Sultanate and their successors, the Mughals, were great patrons of art and architecture and constructed many tombs, mosques and madrasas. These have a distinctive style which bears influences of "later Tughlaq" architecture. Mosques all over India were built in different styles; the most elegant styles developed in areas where indigenous art traditions were strong and local artisans were highly skilled. Thus, regional or provincial styles of mosques grew out of local temple or domestic styles, which were conditioned in their turn by climate, terrain, materials, hence the enormous difference between the mosques of Bengal, Kashmir and Gujarat. The Babri Mosque followed the architectural school of Jaunpur Sultanate. When viewed from the west side, it resembled the Atala Masjid in Jaunpur.

=== Architectural style ===
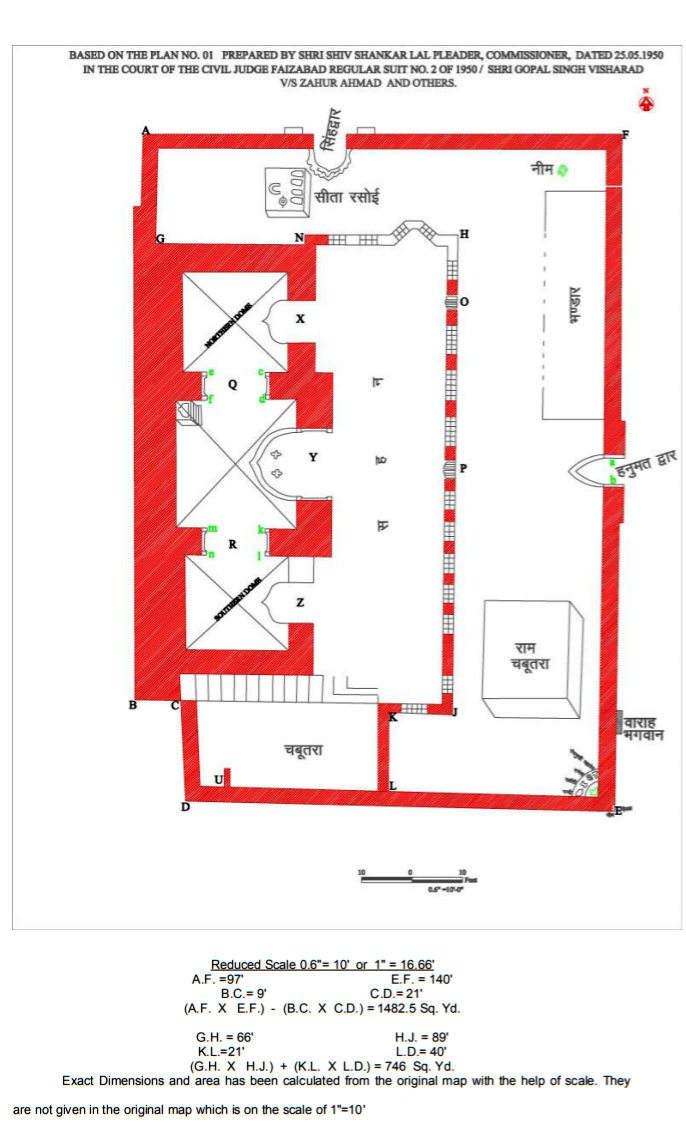
Site map of Babri Masjid

The architecture of the mosque is completely a replica of the mosques in the Delhi Sultanate. Babri was an important mosque of a distinct style, preserved mainly in architecture, developed after the Delhi Sultanate was established, seen also in the Babari Mosque in the southern suburb of the walled city of Gaur, and the Jamali Kamili Mosque built by Sher Shah Suri. This was the forerunner of the Mughal architecture style adopted by Akbar.

=== Acoustics ===
"A whisper from the Babri Masjid mihrab could be heard clearly at the other end, 200 feet [60 m] away and through the length and breadth of the central court" according to Graham Pickford, architect to Lord William Bentinck (1828–33). The mosque's acoustics were mentioned by him in his book Historic Structures of Oudhe where he says "for a 16th-century building the deployment and projection of voice from the pulpit is considerably advanced, the unique deployment of sound in this structure will astonish the visitor".

== History ==
=== Construction ===
The date of construction of the Babri Masjid is uncertain. The inscriptions on the Babri Masjid premises found in the 20th century state that the mosque was built in 935 AH (1528–29) by Mir Baqi in accordance with the wishes of Babur. However, these inscriptions appear to be of a more recent vintage.

There are no records of the mosque from this period. The Baburnama (Chronicles of Babur) does not mention either the mosque or the destruction of a temple. The Ramcharitamanas of Tulsidas (1574) and Ain-i Akbari of Abu'l-Fazl ibn Mubarak (1598) made no mention of a mosque either. William Finch, the English traveller who visited Ayodhya around 1611, wrote about the "ruins of the Ranichand [Ramachand] castle and houses" where Hindus believed the great God "took flesh upon him to see the tamasha of the world." He found pandas (Brahmin priests) in the ruins of the fort, recording the names of pilgrims, but there was no mention of a mosque. Thomas Herbert described in 1634 the "pretty old castle of Ranichand built by a Bannyan Pagod of that name" which he described as an antique monument that was "especially memorable". He also recorded the fact of Brahmins recording the names of pilgrims.

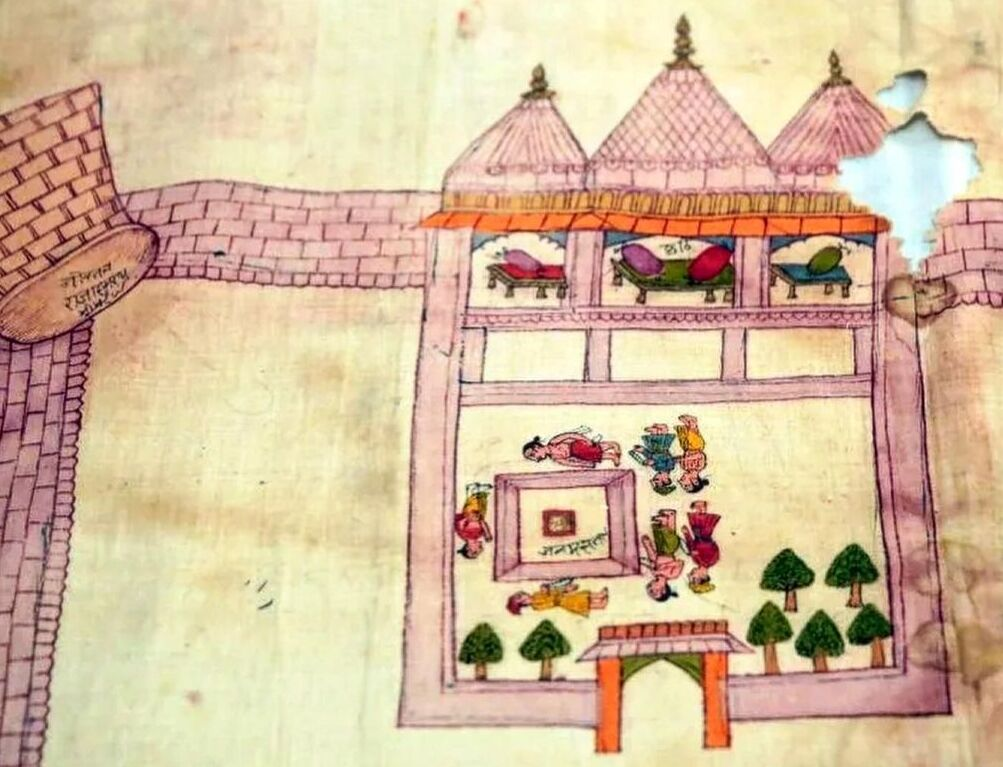
The earliest map of Ram Janmasthan at Ayodhya (1717 CE)

The earliest record of a mosque at the site traditionally believed by Hindus to be the birthplace of Rama comes from Jai Singh II (or "Sawai Jai Singh") – a Rajput noble in the Mughal court who purchased land and established a Jaisinghpura in the area surrounding the mosque in 1717 (as he had also done in several other Hindu religious places). The documents of Jai Singh preserved in the Kapad-Dwar collection in the City Palace Museum of Jaipur, (Note: Professor R. Nath, who has examined these records, concludes that Jai Singh had acquired the land of Rama Janmasthan in 1717. The ownership of the land was vested in the deity. The hereditary title of the ownership was recognised and enforced by the Mughal State from 1717. He also found a letter from a gumastha Trilokchand, dated 1723, stating that, while under the Muslim administration people had been prevented from taking a ritual bath in the Saryu river, the establishment of the Jaisinghpura has removed all impediments.) include a sketch map of the Babri Masjid site. The map shows an open court yard and a built structure with three temple spires (sikharas) resembling today's Babri Masjid with three domes. The courtyard is labelled janmasthan and shows a Ram chabutra. The central bay of the built structure is labelled chhathi, which also denotes birthplace.

Joseph Tiefenthaler, a European Jesuit missionary who lived and worked in India for 38 years (1743–1785), visited Ayodhya in 1767. He noted one Ramkot fortress — comprising the house that was considered as the birthplace of Rama by Hindus — to have been demolished by Aurangzeb (r. 1658–1707); however, "others" said it to have been demolished by Babar. A mosque with three domes was constructed in its place but Hindus continued to offer prayers at a mud platform that marked the birthplace of Rama. (Note: Kunal, Ayodhya Revisited 2016, pp. xvi quotes from Tiefenthaler's Descriptio Indiae (c. 1772): "Emperor Aurangzeb got the fortress called Ramcot demolished and got a Muslim temple, with triple domes, constructed at the same place. Others say that it was constructed by 'Babor'. Fourteen black stone pillars of 5 span high, which had existed at the site of the fortress, are seen there. Twelve of these pillars now support the interior arcades of the mosque. Two (of these 12) are placed at the entrance of the cloister. The two others are part of the tomb of some 'Moor'.... On the left is seen a square box, raised five inches from the ground, with borders made of lime, with a length of more than 5 ells and a maximum width of about 4. The Hindus call it Bedi, i.e., 'the cradle'. The reason for this is that once upon a time, here was a house where Beschan [Vishnu] was born in the form of Ram. It is said that his three brothers too were born here. Aurangzeb or Babor, according to others, got this place razed in order to deny them the noble people, opportunity of practising their superstitions...")

=== Inscriptions ===
The Disputed Mosque: A Historical Inquiry by Sushil Srivastava mentions that the Babri Masjid has three inscriptions in Persian, in different styles of calligraphy, two outside and one inside the mosque-just above the pulpit. A.S. Beveridge's translation of the inscription inside the mosque, mentions that by the order of Babar, Mir Baqi constructed the mosque in the year AH 935 (AD 1529). The summary of the findings of B. B. Lal's excavating team by S. P. Gupta is in agreement with this inscription. Only six lines of one of the two external inscriptions are legible. The legible inscription has apparently been written in praise of God, prophet Muhammad and Babar, who has been called a qalandar.

Francis Buchanan-Hamilton (Buchanan) did a survey of the Gorakhpur Division in 1813–14 on behalf of the British East India Company. His report was never published but partly reused by Montgomery Martin later. Kishore Kunal examined the original report in the British Library archives. It states that the Hindus generally attributed destruction "to the furious zeal of Aurangzabe". Yet, it was ascertained to have been built by Babur by relying upon "an inscription on its walls". The said inscription in Persian was said to have been copied by a scribe and translated by a Maulvi friend of Buchanan. The translation however contained five pieces of text, including two inscriptions. The first inscription said that the mosque was constructed by Mir Baqi in the year 935 AH or 923 AH. (Note: Kunal, Ayodhya Revisited 2016, Chapter 5: "By order of King Babur whose justice is a building reaching to the mansions of heaven, this alighting place of the angels was erected by Meer Baquee a nobleman impressed with the seal of happiness. This is lasting Charity in the year of its construction what declares in manifest "that good works are lasting." The anagram "good works are lasting" represented the year 935. "From the Tughra: There is no God but God, and Mohammad is the Prophet of God. Say, O'Mohammad, that God is one, that God is holy, unbegetting and unbegotten, and that he hath no equal.") The second inscription narrated the genealogy of Aurangzeb. (Note: Kunal, Ayodhya Revisited 2016, Chapter 5:"The victorious lord, Mooheyoo Din, Aulumgir, Badshah, the destroyer of infidels, the son of Shah Juhan, the son of Juhangeer Shah; the son of Ukbar Shah; the son of Humayoon Shah, the son of Babur Shah; the son Oomer Sheikh Shah; the son of Soolatan Uboo Saeed; the son of Soolatan Moohammad Shah; the son of Meeran Shah, the son of Shaib-i-Qiran Meer Tymoor." "From the Tughra: In the name of God, most merciful I testify that there is no God but God. He is one, and without equal. I also testify that Mohammad is his Servant and Prophet." "Upon the propitious date of this noble erection, by this weak slave Moohummud Funa Ullah.") In addition to the two inscriptions and their monograms (tughras), a fable concerning a dervish called Musha Ashiqan was also included. The translator doubted that the fable was part of the inscription but recorded that the scribe "positively says that the inscription was executed at the erection of this building". The translator also had a difficulty with the anagram for the date, because one of the words was missing, which would have resulted in a date of 923 AH rather than 935 AH. These incongruities and mismatches made no impression on Buchanan, who maintained that the mosque was built by Babur.

In 1877, Syed Mohammad Asghar the Mutawalli (guardian) of the "Masjid Baburi at Janmasthan" filed a petition with the Commissioner of Faizabad asking him to restrain the Hindus that raised a chabutara on the spot regarded as the birthplace of Rama. In the petition, he stated that Babur had inscribed one word "Allah" above the door. The district judge and the sub-judge visited the mosque in the presence of all parties and their lawyers and confirmed this fact. No other inscriptions were recorded. In 1889, archaeologist Anton Führer visited the mosque and found three inscriptions. One was a Quranic verse. The inscription XLI was Persian poetry in the metre Ramal, which stated that the mosque was erected by a noble 'Mir Khan' of Babur. (Note: Kunal, Ayodhya Revisited 2016, p. 168: 1. By the order of Babur, the king of the world; 2. This firmament-like, lofty; 3. Strong building was erected; 4. By the auspicious noble Mir Khan; 5. May ever remain such a foundation; 6. And such a king of the world.) The inscription XLII was also Persian poetry in metre Ramal, and said that the mosque was founded in year 930 AH by a grandee of Babur, who was (comparable to) "another King of Turkey and China". (Note: Kunal, Ayodhya Revisited 2016, p. 169: 1. In the name of God, the merciful, the clement.; 2. In the name of him who...; may God perpetually keep him in the world.; 3. ....; 4. Such a sovereign who is famous in the world and in person of delight for the world.; 5. In his presence one of the grandees who is another King of Turkey and China.; 6. Laid this religious foundation in the auspicious Hijra 930.; 7. O God! May always remain the crown, throne and life with the king.; 8. May Babar always pour the flowers of happiness; may remain successful.; 9. His counsellor and minister who is the founder of this fort masjid.; 10. This poetry, giving the date and eulogy, was written by the lazy writer and poor servant Fath-Allah-Ghori, composer.) The year 930 AH corresponds to 1523, three years before Babur's conquest of Hindustan. Despite the apparent contradiction, Führer published the date of "A. H. 930 during the reign of Babar", in his book of 1891.

Writer Kishore Kunal states that all the inscriptions claimed were fake. They were affixed almost 285 years after the supposed construction of the mosque in 1528, and repeatedly replaced. His own assessment is that the mosque was built around 1660 by governor Fedai Khan of Aurangzeb, who demolished many temples in Ayodhya. Lal Das, who wrote Awadh-Vilasa in 1672 describes the janmasthan (Rama's birthplace) accurately but does not mention a temple at the site.

These developments were apparently known to local Muslims. In mid-nineteenth century, the Muslim activist Mirza Jan quoted from a book Sahifa-I-Chihil Nasaih Bahadur Shahi, which was said to have been written by a daughter of the emperor Bahadur Shah I (and granddaughter of Aurangzeb) in the early 18th century. The text mentions mosques having been constructed after demolishing the "temples of the idolatrous Hindus situated at Mathura, Banaras and Awadh etc." Hindus are said to have called these demolished temples in Awadh "Sita Rasoi" (Sita's kitchen) and "Hanuman's abode." While there was no mention of Babur in this account, the Ayodhya mosque had been juxtaposed with those built by Aurangzeb at Mathura and Banaras. The manuscript, Sahifa-I-Chihil Nasaih Bahadur Shahi, has not yet been found, and scholar Stephan Conermann has stated that Mirza Jan book, Hadiqa-yi shuhada, is not reliable. Some historians like R.S. Sharma, M. Athar Ali, D.N. Jha and Archeologist Suraj Bhan have concluded in their work, A Historians' Report to the Nation, that It is very likely, that the work (Sahifa-I-Chihil Nasaih Bahadur Shahi) or the passage (quoted above in this paragraph) was a figment of Mirza Jan's imagination.

=== 1850s-1930s disputes and temple construction attempts ===
In 1853, a group of armed Hindu ascetics from Hanuman Garhi temple occupied the Babri Masjid. Periodic violence erupted in the next two years, and the civil administration had to step in, refusing permission to build a temple or to use it as a place of worship. Gulam Hussain led a group of Sunni Muslims who asserted that the mosque site was home to the Hanuman temple in 1855. After a Hindu-Muslim clash, a boundary wall was constructed to avoid further disputes. It divided the mosque premises into two courtyards; the Muslims offered prayers in the inner courtyard. In 1857, the mahant of the Hanuman Garhi temple erected a raised platform and marked the site of Rama's birth. The Hindus offered their prayers on a raised platform, known as "Ram Chabutara", in the outer courtyard.

In 1883, the Hindus launched an effort to construct a temple on the platform. After Muslim protests, the deputy commissioner prohibited any temple construction on 19 January 1885. On 27 January 1885, Raghubar Das, the Hindu mahant (priest) of the Ram Chabutara filed a civil suit before the Faizabad Sub-Judge. In response, the mutawalli (Muslim trustee) of the mosque argued that the entire land belonged to the mosque. On 24 December 1885, the Sub Judge Pandit Hari Kishan Singh dismissed the suit. On 18 March 1886, the District Judge F.E.A. Chamier also dismissed an appeal against the lower court judgment. He agreed that the mosque was built on the land considered sacred by the Hindus, but ordered maintenance of status quo, since it was "too late now to remedy the grievance". A subsequent appeal before the Judicial Commissioner W. Young was also dismissed on 1 November 1886.

On 27 March 1934, a Hindu–Muslim riot occurred in Ayodhya, triggered by cow slaughter in the nearby Shahjahanpur village. The walls around the Masjid and one of the domes of the Masjid were damaged during the riots. These were reconstructed by the British Indian government using Hindu funds.

=== Shia–Sunni dispute ===
In 1936, the United Provinces government enacted U.P. Muslim Waqf Act for the better administration of waqf properties in the state. In accordance with this act, the Babri Masjid and its adjacent graveyard (Ganj-e-Saheedan Qabristan) were registered as Waqf no. 26 Faizabad with the UP Sunni Central Board of Waqfs. The Shias disputed the Sunni ownership of the mosque, claiming that the site belonged to them because Mir Baqi was a Shia. The commissioner of Waqfs initiated an inquiry into the dispute. The inquiry concluded that the mosque belonged to the Sunnis, since it was commissioned by Babur, who was a Sunni. The concluding report was published in an official gazette dated 26 February 1944. In 1945, the Shia Central Board moved to court against this decision. On 23 March 1946, Judge S. A. Ahsan ruled in favour of the UP Sunni Central Board of Waqfs.

=== Placement of Hindu idols ===
In December 1949, the Hindu organisation Akhil Bharatiya Ramayana Mahasabha organised a non-stop nine-day recitation of the Ramacharitamanas just outside the mosque. At the end of this event, on the night of 22–23 December 1949, a group of 50–60 people entered the mosque and placed idols of Rama there. On the morning of 23 December, the event organisers asked Hindu devotees to come to the mosque for a darshan. As thousands of Hindus started visiting the place, the government declared the mosque a disputed area and locked its gates.

Home Minister Vallabhbhai Patel and Prime Minister Jawaharlal Nehru directed the state's chief minister Govind Ballabh Pant to remove the idols, however Pant was not willing to remove the idols. Pant wrote in response that "there is a reasonable chance of success, but things are still in a fluid state and it will be hazardous to say more at this stage". By 1950, the state took control of the structure under section 145 CrPC and allowed Hindus, not Muslims, to perform their worship at the site.

On 16 January 1950, Gopal Singh Visharad filed a civil suit in the Faizabad Court, asking that Hindus be allowed to worship Rama and Sita at the place. In 1959, the Nirmohi Akhara filed another lawsuit demanding possession of the mosque. On 18 December 1961, the Uttar Pradesh Sunni Central Waqf Board also filed a lawsuit, demanding possession of the site and removal of idols from the mosque premises.

== Demolition ==
In April 1984, the Vishwa Hindu Parishad (VHP) initiated a campaign to gather public support for Hindu access to the Babri Masjid and other structures that had been allegedly built over Hindu shrines. To raise public awareness, VHP planned nationwide rath yatras (chariot processions), the first of which took place in September–October 1984, from Sitamarhi to Ayodhya. The campaign was temporarily suspended after the assassination of Indira Gandhi, but was revived in 25 places on 23 October 1985. On 25 January 1986, a 28-year-old local lawyer named Umesh Chandra Pandey appealed to a court to remove the restrictions on Hindu worship in the Babri Masjid premises. Subsequently, the Rajiv Gandhi government ordered the locks on the Babri Masjid gates to be removed. Earlier, the only Hindu ceremony permitted at the site was a Hindu priest performing an annual puja. After the ruling, all Hindus were given access to the site, and the mosque gained some function as a Hindu temple.

Communal tension in the region worsened when the VHP received permission to perform a shilanyas (stone-laying ceremony) at the disputed site before the national election in November 1989. A senior Bharatiya Janata Party (BJP) leader, L K Advani, started a rath yatra, embarking on a 10,000 km journey starting from the south and heading towards Ayodhya. On 6 December 1992, BJP, VHP and Rashtriya Swayamsevak Sangh (RSS) leaders gathered at the site to offer prayers and perform a symbolic kar seva. At noon, a teenage Kar Sevak (volunteer) was "vaulted" on to the dome and that signalled the breaking of the outer cordon. Soon after, a large number of kar sevaks demolished the mosque.

=== Aftermath ===
Communal riots between Hindus and Muslims ensued across India immediately following demolition of the mosque. Rioting in the immediate aftermath resulted in the deaths of an estimated 2,000–3,000 people. Six weeks of riots further erupted in Bombay, resulting in the deaths of an estimated 900 people.

Jihadist outfits like Indian Mujahideen and Lashkar-e-Taiba have cited the demolition of Babri Masjid as justification for attacks directed against India. D-Company Crime Boss Dawood Ibrahim, wanted in India for his alleged ties to the 1993 Bombay bombings which killed 257 people, is believed to have been infuriated by Babri Masjid's demolition.

The site has since become a magnet for pilgrims. According to The Economist, "Among its souvenir stalls, those doing the briskest trade are the ones playing videos on a loop of Hindu fundamentalists demolishing the mosque."

=== Regional impact ===
Riots in the aftermath of Babri Masjid's demolition extended to Bangladesh, where hundreds of shops, homes and temples of Hindus were destroyed. Widespread retaliatory attacks against scores of Hindu and Jain temples also took place across neighbouring Pakistan, with police not intervening. Reprisal attacks against Hindus in both countries, in turn, entered the discourse of right-wing Hindu nationalists – for example, in 1995, the VHP appealed to the United Nations to protect Hindus in Bangladesh, Pakistan and Kashmir. Babri Masjid's demolition and its violent repercussions have negatively affected relations between India and Pakistan, and remain strained until the present day.

=== Liberhan Commission ===
The Liberhan Commission set up by the government to investigate the demolition later blamed 68 people including senior BJP, RSS and VHP leaders for the demolition. Among those criticised in the report were Atal Bihari Vajpayee, the party's chief LK Advani, and chief minister Kalyan Singh. A 2005 book by the former Intelligence Bureau (IB) Joint Director Maloy Krishna Dhar claimed the senior leaders of RSS, BJP, VHP and Bajrang Dal had planned the demolition 10 months in advance. He also suggested that the Indian National Congress leaders, including prime minister P V Narasimha Rao and home minister S B Chavan, had ignored warnings about the demolition for deriving political benefits.

== Archaeological excavations ==
In 2003, by the order of an Indian court, the Archaeological Survey of India (ASI) was asked to conduct a more in-depth study and an excavation to ascertain the type of structure that was beneath the rubble. The excavation was conducted from 12 March 2003 to 7 August 2003, resulting in 1360 discoveries. The ASI submitted its report to the Allahabad high court.

The summary of the ASI report indicated what appears to be the presence of a 10th-century shrine under the mosque. According to the ASI team, the human activity at the site dates back to the 13th century BC. The next few layers date back to the Shunga period (2nd-1st century BC) and the Kushan period. During the early medieval period (11–12th century), a short-lived structure of nearly 50 metres with north–south orientation was constructed. On the remains of this structure, another massive structure was constructed: this structure had at least three structural phases and three successive floors attached with it. The report concluded that it was over this construction that the disputed structure was constructed during the early 16th century.

Muslim groups immediately disputed the ASI findings. The Safdar Hashmi Memorial Trust (Sahmat) criticised the report saying that it said that "presence of animal bones throughout as well as of the use of 'surkhi' and lime mortar" that was found by ASI are all characteristic of Muslim presence "that rule out the possibility of a Hindu temple having been there beneath the mosque." The report claimed otherwise on the basis of 'pillar bases' was contested since no pillars were found, and the alleged existence of 'pillar bases' has been debated by archaeologists. Syed Rabe Hasan Nadvi, chairman of the All India Muslim Personal Law Board (AIMPLB) alleged that ASI failed to mention any evidence of a temple in its interim reports and only revealed it in the final report which was submitted during a time of national tension, making the report highly suspect.

The Allahabad High Court, however, upheld the ASI's findings.

== Title cases verdict ==
A land title case on the site was lodged in the Allahabad High Court, the verdict of which was pronounced on 30 September 2010. In their verdict, the three judges of The Allahabad High Court ruled that the 1.1 hectares (2 3/4 acres) of Ayodhya land be divided into three parts, with one-third going to the Ram Lalla or Infant Lord Rama represented by the Hindu Maha Sabha for the construction of the Ram temple, one-third going to the Islamic Uttar Pradesh Sunni Central Waqf Board and the remaining one-third going to Nirmohi Akhara, a Hindu religious denomination. While the three-judge bench was not unanimous that the disputed structure was constructed after demolition of a temple, it did agree that a temple or a temple structure predated the mosque at the same site. The excavations by the Archaeological Survey of India were heavily used as evidence by the court that the predating structure was a massive Hindu religious building.

The five judge Supreme Court bench heard the title dispute cases from August to October 2019. The Court observed that archaeological evidence from ASI shows that the Babri Masjid was constructed on a "structure", whose architecture was distinctly indigenous and non-Islamic. The court concluded that no evidence was found that the structure was specifically demolished for the construction of the Babri Masjid. On 9 November 2019, the Supreme Court ordered the land to be handed over to a trust to build the Hindu temple. It also ordered the government to allot an alternative 2-hectare (5-acre) plot to the Uttar Pradesh Sunni Central Waqf Board to build a mosque, which the government allotted in Dhannipur, Ayodhya. As of September 2024, construction of the new mosque had not commenced.

== See also ==
- Islam in India
- Hinduism in India
- List of mosques in India
- Conversion of mosques into non-Islamic places of worship
- Conversion of non-Islamic places of worship into mosques
