= Hans T. Bakker =

British cultural historian

Hans Bakker
- Born: 1948 (age 77–78)

Hans T. Bakker (born 1948) is a cultural historian and Indologist, who has served as the Professor of the History of Hinduism and Jan Gonda Chair at the University of Groningen. He worked in the British Museum as a researcher in the project "Beyond Boundaries: Religion, Region, Language and the State".

== Career ==
Before joining the British Museum in 2014, Bakker was at the University of Groningen in The Netherlands where he was director of the Institute of Indian Studies at Groningen and, from 1996, Professor of the History of Hinduism in the Sanskrit Tradition and Indian Philosophy and holder of the Jan Gonda Chair at the University of Groningen. He has been a visiting fellow of All Souls College at the University of Oxford and a visiting professor at the University of Vienna and the University of Kyoto.

Bakker's main research interest has been the political and religious culture of India in the fourth, fifth and sixth centuries. As part of this work he led the study of the earliest known version of the Skanda Purāṇa preserved in Kathmandu, Nepal. This version of the Skanda Purāṇa is substantially different from the Skanda Purāṇa known from manuscripts and the printed edition in India.

Bakker has continued and expanded the best traditions of Dutch Indology and has trained a number of able scholars, among them Peter Bisschop (Leiden University), Harunaga Isaacson (University of Hamburg) and Yuko Yokochi (University of Kyoto).

Bakker has been working as researcher in "Beyond Boundaries: Religion, Region, Language and the State", a project based in the British Museum that is funded by the European Research Council (2013–2019).

== Works ==
=== Books ===
- 1986 Ayodhyā. Part I: The History of Ayodhyā from the 7th century BC to the middle of the 18th century. Part II: Ayodhyāmāhātmya. Groningen: Groningen Oriental Studies, vol. I.
- 1989 De Leer van de Wind. Een natuurfilosofie uit de Upanisaden, ingeleid, vertaald en geannoteerd door Hans Bakker. Kok/Agora, Kampen. pp. 103.
- 1997 The Vākāṭakas. An Essay in Hindu Iconology. Groningen. Gonda Indological Studies vol. V. pp. xiv, 263.
- 1997 De Schaamteloosheid tot het Uiterste Gedreven. Rede uitgesproken bij de aanvaarding van het ambt van bijzonder hoogleraar in de Interpretatie van het Hindoeïsme in de Sanskrit-Traditie vanwege de Stichting J. Gonda-Fonds (KNAW) bij de Faculteit der Godgeleerdheid en Godsdienstwetenschap van de Rijksuniversiteit Groningen op 27 mei 1997. Koninklijke Nederlandse Akademie van Wetenschappen, Amsterdam, 1997. Gonda Lectures.
- 1998 The Skandapurāṇa, Volume I. Adhyāyas 1–25. Critically Edited with Prolegomena and English Synopsis by R. Adriaensen, H. T. Bakker & H. Isaacson. Groningen. Supplement to Groningen Oriental Studies. pp. xiv, 349.
- 2004 The Skandapurāṇa, Volume II A, Adhyāyas 26–31.14: The Vārāṇasī Cycle. Critical Edition with an Introduction, English Synopsis & Philological and Historical Commentary by Hans T. Bakker & Harunaga Isaacson. Egbert Forsten, Groningen. pp. xvi, 345. Supplement to Groningen Oriental Studies.
- 2014 The Skandapurāṇa Volume II B, Adhyāyas 31–52. The Vāhana and Naraka Cycles. Critical edition with an Introduction and Annotated English Synopsis by Hans T. Bakker, Peter C. Bisschop, and Yuko Yokochi. In cooperation with: Nina Mirnig and Judit Törzsök. Brill, Leiden 2014. pp. xii, 372. Supplement to Groningen Oriental Studies.
- 2014 The World of the Skandapurāṇa. Northern India in the Sixth and Seventh Centuries. Brill, Leiden. pp. xvi, 316. Supplement to Groningen Oriental Studies. doi:10.1163/9789004277144
- 2017 Monuments of Hope, Gloom, and Glory, in the age of the Hunnic Wars: 50 years that changed India (484-534). Royal Netherlands Academy of Arts and Sciences, Amsterdam. 24th J. Gonda Lecture. Japanese translation (Kibō, Shitsui, Eikō no Kinenhi—Indo wo kaeta 50(gojū) nen ni wataru Hun tono tataka’i (484–534nen) in: Ajia Bukkyō Bijutsu Ronshū, Minami Ajia I: Mauriya-chō 〜 Gupta-chō (Buddhist Art in Asia, South Asia I: from Maurya to Gupta dynasty), Ed. by Miyamoto Akira and Fukuyama Yasuko, Tokyo, Chūōkōron Bijutsu Shuppan, 2020. pp. 417–454.
- 2019 Holy Ground -- Where Art and Text Meet. Studies in the Cultural History of India. Brill, Leiden/Boston. Gonda Indological Studies 20. doi:10.1163/9789004412071
- 2020 The Alkhan -- A Hunnic People in South Asia. Barkhuis, Groningen. Companion to Hunnic Peoples in Central and South Asia, Fasc. 1.
- 2021 Aristotle’s Epistemology. Barkhuis, Groningen. pp. ix, 58. https://www.barkhuis.nl/product_info.php?products_id=267
- 2023 The Five Realities: Kauṇḍinya's Commentary on the Pāśupatasūtras. Chapter 1, Based on the critical edition by Peter Bisschop (2022). Translated and annotated by Hans T . Bakker. Draft 1: June 5, 2023. Academia. https://britishmuseum.academia.edu/HansTBakker

=== Edited collections ===
- 1981 (Editor together with A. W. Entwistle) Vaiṣṇavism. The History of the Kṛṣṇa and Rāma Cults and their Contribution to Indian Pilgrimage. Groningen. pp. 206.
- 1983 (Editor together with A. W. Entwistle) Devī. The worship of the Goddess and its contribution to Indian pilgrimage. Groningen. pp. 133.
- 1988 (Editor together with M. Gosman) De Orient—Droom of Dreiging? Het Oosten in Westers Perspektief. Kok/Agora, Kampen. pp. 175.
- 1990 (Editor) The History of Sacred Places in India as reflected in Traditional Literature. Papers on Pilgrimage in South Asia. Brill, Leiden. Panels of the VIIth World Sanskrit Conference vol. iii. pp. 221.
- 1991 (Editor together with M. Gosman) Heilige Oorlogen. Een onderzoek naar historische en hedendaagse vormen van collectief religieus geweld. Kok/Agora, Kampen. pp. 260.
- 1992 (Editor) The Sacred Centre as the Focus of Political Interest. Proceedings of the symposium held on the occasion of the 375th anniversary of the University of Groningen, 5–8 March 1989. Forsten, Groningen. Groningen Oriental Studies vol. vi, 268.
- 1999 (Editor together with Ellen Raven) Fifteenth International Conference on South Asian Archaeology, Leiden, 5–9 July 1999. Abstracts. IIAS Leiden. European Association of South Asian Archæologists. pp. 67.
- 2004 (Editor) Origin and Growth of the Purāṇic Text Corpus with Special Reference to the Skandapurāṇa. Delhi. Papers of the 12th World Sanskrit Conference Vol. 3.2. pp. xii, 208.
- 2004 (Editor) The Vākāṭaka Heritage. Indian Culture at the Crossroads. Edited by Hans T. Bakker. Egbert Forsten, Groningen 2004. Gonda Indological Studies XIII. pp. viii, 196.
- 2005 (Editor) Een Tuil Orchideëen. Anthologie uit de Tuin der Geesteswetenschappen te Groningen. Barkhuis Publishing, Groningen. pp. viii, 247.
- 2008 (Editor) Mansar. The Discovery of Pravareśvara and Pravarapura, Temple and Residence of the Vākāṭaka King Pravarasena II. Proceedings of a Symposium at the British Museum, London, 30 June 1 July 2008. Library of the University of Groningen, Groningen.

çç=== Articles ===

List of articles
- 1980 A Dutch Project on Pilgrimage in India. in: IAVRI Bulletin viii, 18–21.
- 1982 The rise of Ayodhyā as a place of pilgrimage. in: Indo-Iranian Journal 24, 103–126.
- 1982 On the origin of the Sāṃkhya psychology. in: Wiener Zeitschrift für die Kunde Südasiens Bd.xxvi, 117–148.
- 1985 The Agastyasaṃhitā and the History of the Rāma Cult. in: Proceedings of the Fifth World Sanskrit Conference. Delhi. pp. 446–455.
- 1986 Ayodhyā: le nom et le lieu. in: Revue de l'Histoire des Religions cciii/1, 53–66. [new illustrated edition in: Bakker (ed.), Een Tuil Orchideeën, Groningen 2004, 233–241]
- 1987 Reflections on the Evolution of Rāma Devotion in the Light of Textual and Archæological Evidence. in: Wiener Zeitschrift für die Kunde Südasiens Bd. xxxi, 9–42.
- 1987 An old text of the Rāma devotion: the Agastyasaṃhitā. in: Navonmeṣa, M.M. Gopinath Kaviraj Smriti Granth iv, Varanasi. pp. 300–306.
- 1988 De Culturele Ontdekking van India. Romantische Geestdrift en de Opkomst der Oriëntalistiek. in: Bakker & Gosman 1988, 94–112.
- 1989 Some Methodological Considerations with Respect to the Critical Edition of Purāṇic Literature. in: xxiii. Deutscher Orientalistentag vom 16. bis 20. September 1985 in Würzburg. Ausgewählte Vorträge hrsg.von Einar von Schuler. Stuttgart. pp. 329–341.
- 1989 The Ramtek Inscriptions. in: Bulletin of the School of Oriental and African Studies vol.lii.3, 467–496.
- 1989 The Antiquities of Ramtek Hill (Maharashtra). in: Journal of South Asian Studies 5, 79–102.
- 1990 An Indian Image of Man. An Inquiry into a Change of Perspective in the Hindu World-view. in: Concepts of Persons in Religion and Thought. Edit. by H.G. Kippenberg, Yme B. Kuiper and Andy F. Sanders. Berlin/New York. pp. 279–307.
- 1990 Ramtek: An Ancient Centre of Viṣṇu Devotion in Maharashtra. in: Bakker 1990, 62–85.
- 1990 The History of Hanumat Worship in Ayodhyā. in: Pilgrimage Studies: Text and Context. śrī Phalāhārī Bābā Commemoration Volume edit. by Lalanji Gopal and D.P. Dubey. Muirabad/Allahabad (Pilgrimage Studies No. II). pp. 127–135.
- 1990 (Together with R. Barkhuis en F.J. Velthuis) Printing Nāgarī Script with TEX. in: Newsletter of the International Association of Sanskrit Studies No.3, edit. by Siegfried Lienhard. Stockholm/Turin. pp. 27–34.
- 1991 Vormen van religieus geweld in India: de zaak Ayodhyā. in: Bakker & Gosman 1991, pp. 155–175.
- 1991 Ayodhyā: A Hindu Jerusalem. An investigation of ‘Holy War' as a religious idea in the light of communal unrest in India. in: Numen vol. xxxviii.1, 80–109.
- 1991 The Footprints of the Lord. in: Devotion Divine. Bhakti Traditions from the Regions of India. Studies in Honour of Charlotte Vaudeville. Groningen/Paris (Groningen Oriental Studies vol. viii). pp. 19–37.
- 1991 Opening. in: Waarom Sanskrit? Honderdvijfentwintig Jaar Sanskrit in Nederland. Leiden. pp. 7–11.
- 1992 Throne and Temple. Political Power and Religious Prestige in Vidarbha. in: Bakker 1992, 83–100.
- 1992 The Tradition of the Agastyasam. hitā. in: A. Wezler and E. Hammerschmidt (eds.), Proceedings of the xxxii International Congress for Asian and North African Studies Hamburg. Stuttgart. (Zeitschrift der deutschen morgenländischen Gesellschaft, Supplement ix). pp. 518–519.
- 1992 Memorials, Temples, Gods, and Kings. An attempt to unravel the symbolic texture of Vākāt.aka kingship. in: A.W. van den Hoek, D.H.A. Kolff, M.S. Oort (eds.), Ritual, State and History in South Asia. Essays in Honour of J.C. Heesterman. Leiden 1992. pp. 7–19.
- 1992 The Manbhaus' Seat on Ramtek Hill. in: Devotional Literature in South Asia: Current Research, 1985–88. Edit. by R.S. McGregor. Cambridge 1992. pp. 11–25.
- 1993 (Together with H. Isaacson) The Ramtek Inscriptions II. The Vākāt.aka Inscription in the Kevala- Narasim. ha Temple. in: Bulletin of the School of Oriental and African Studies vol.lvi.1, 46–74.
- 1993 A Newly Found Statue from Nagardhan. in: South Asian Archæology 1991. Edit. by Adalbert J. Gail and Gerd J.R. Mevissen, Stuttgart. pp. 303–311.
- 1993 Early Mythology Relating to Vārāṇasī. in: Rana P.B. Singh (ed.), Banāras (Vārāṇasī). Cosmic Order, Sacred City and Hindu Traditions. Festschrift to Prof R.L. Singh. Varanasi 1993. pp. 21–28.
- 1993 Laudatio. in: Studies in Honour of Gerrit Jan Meulenbeld presented by friends and colleagues on the occasion of his 65th birthday on 28 May 1993, edit. by R.E. Emmerick and R.P. Das. = Journal of the European āyurvedic Society vol. 3 (1993), pp. 1–11.
- 1994 Die Indische Herausforderung. Hegels Beitrag zu einer europäischen kulturhistorischen Diskussion. in: H. Bakker, J. Schickel und B. Nagel, Indische Philosophie und europäische Rezeption. J.Dinter Verlag, Köln [1994]. Dialectica Minora 5. pp. 33–56.
- 1994 New Technology and Ancient Manuscripts. The Institute for Indian Languages and Cultures at the University of Groningen. in: IIAS Newsletter 3 (1994), 25.
- 1994 (Together with R. Adriaensen and H. Isaacson) Towards a Critical Edition of the Skandapurāṇa. in: Indo-Iranian Journal 37 (1994), 325–331.
- 1995 Observations on the History and Culture of Dakṣiṇa Kosala (5th to 7th centuries AD). in: Nalini Balbir & Joachim K. Bautze (eds.), Festschrift Klaus Bruhn, zur Vollendung des 65. Lebensjahres dargebracht von Schülern, Freunden und Kollegen. Reinbek 1994 (1995), pp. 1–66.
- 1995 Funktion und Macht des Hindu-Tempels im regionalen Kontext. Drei historische Beispiele. in: Hans G. Kippenberg und Brigitte Luchesi (eds.), Lokale Religionsgeschichte, Marburg 1995, pp. 191–199.
- 1996 Construction and Reconstruction of Sacred Space in Vārāṇasī. in: Numen 43 (1996), 32–55.
- 1996 Pārvatī's Svayam.vara. Studies in the Skandapurāṇa I. in: WienerZeitschrift für die Kunde Südasiens 40 (1996), 5–43.
- 1996 [Review article of:] O.M. Starza, The Jagannatha Temple at Puri. in:Journal of the Economic and Social History of the Orient 39.2 (1996), 198–200.
- 1997 The Twelve-faced śiva Image from Mandhal. in: R. & B. Allchin (eds.), South Asian Archæology 1995. Proceedings of the 13th Conference of the European Association of South Asian Archaeologists, Cambridge,5–9 July 1995. Volume 2, pp. 637–649.
- 1998 The Sacred Centre as the Focus of Indological Research: The history of India's most holy tīrtha, Vārāṇasī, reconsidered. in: Jaroslav Vacek& Jan Dvoˇr´ak (eds.), Trends in Indian Studies. Proceedings of the European Symposium of Indian Studies. Studia Orientalia PragensiaXVIII, Charles University Prague. Prague, pp. 9–20.
- 1999 [Review article of:] Doris Meth Srinivasan, Many Heads, Arms and Eyes. in: Artibus Asiae 58 3/4 (1999), 339–343.
- 1999 (Together with Peter Bisschop) Mokṣadharma 187 and 239–241 Reconsidered. in: Asiatische Studien/Études Asiatiques LII.3 (1999), 459–472. [= Proceedings of the ‘Conference Sām. khya and Yoga,' Université de Lausanne, November 6–8, 1998.]
- 2000 Little Kṛṣṇa's Play with the Moon. in: Mariola Offredi (ed.), The Banyan Tree. Essays on Early Literature in New Indo-Aryan Languages(Proceedings of the Seventh International Conference on Early Literature in New-Indo-Aryan Languages, Venice 1997). New Delhi. 2vols., II pp. 353–362.
- 2000 An Enigmatic Giant from Tala. in: L.S. Nigam (ed.), Riddle of Indian Iconography (Zetetic on Rare Icon from Tālā). Delhi. pp. 101–105.
- 2000 A Hindu Response to Muslim Intrusion. Evidence of Early Forms of Devotion to Rāma. in: Gautam, M.K & G.H. Schokker (eds.), Bhaktiin Current Research 1982–85. Proceedings of the Third International Conference on Devotional Literature in New Indo-Aryan Languages, Noordwijkerhout 1985. Lucknow/Ghaziabad/Delhi. pp. 69–87, Figs.1–6.
- 2000 Somaśarman, Somavam.śa and Somasiddhānta. A Pāśupata tradition in seventh-century Dakṣiṇa Kosala. Studies in the Skandapurāṇa III.in: Wezler, Albrecht & Ryutaro Tsuchida, Felicitation Volume MinoruHara at the occasion of his 70th birthday. Hamburg 2000 [= 2001]. pp. 1–19.
- 2000 Tala Revisited. in: Maurizio Taddei and Giuseppe De Marco (eds.), South Asian Archaeology 1997. Proceedings of the Fourteenth International Conference of the European Association of South Asian Archaeologist, held in the Istituto Italiano per l'Africa el'Oriente, Palazzo Brancaccio, Rome, 7–14 July 1997. Rome 2000 [= 2001]. Vol. III, pp. 1155–1170.
- 2001 Dakṣiṇāmūrti. in: Karttunen, Klaus & Petteri Koskikallio (eds.), Vidyārnavavandanam. Essays in Honour of Asko Parpola. Helsinki 2001. pp. 41–53.
- 2001 Sources for Reconstructing Ancient Forms of Śiva Worship. in:François Grimal (ed.), Les sources et le temps/Sources and Time. A colloquium, Pondicherry, 11–13 January 1997, Pondichéry 2001.pp. 397–412.
- 2001 The Archaeological Site of Mansar. An Iconological Approach to Indian History: an Example. in: Torella, Raffaele (ed.), Le Parole e i Marmi.Studi in onore di Raniero Gnoli nel suo 70o compleanno. Roma 2001[= 2002]. Serie Orientale Roma XCII. Vol. I, pp. 1–11.
- 2002 Religion and Politics in the Eastern Vākāt.aka Kingdom. in: SouthAsian Studies 18 (2002), 1–24.
- 2002 Religion and Politics in the Eastern Vākāt.aka Kingdom. in: South Asian Studies18 (2002), 1–24.
- 2004 The Structure of the Vārāṇasīmāhātmya in Skandapurāṇa 26–31. in:Bakker, Hans T. (ed.), Origin and Growth of the Purāṇic Text Corpuswith Special Reference to the Skandapurāṇa. Delhi. pp. 1–16.
- 2004 At the Right Side of the Teacher: Imagination, Imagery, and Imagein Vedic and śaiva Initiation. in: Granoff, Phyllis & Koichi Shinohara(eds.), Images in Asian Religions. Toronto 2004. pp. 117–148.
- 2004 Mansar. in: Bakker, Hans T. (ed.), The Vakataka Heritage. Groningen.pp. 71–85.
- 2005 Commemorating the Dead. A note on Skandagupta's Bhitarī Inscription, vss. 8–12. in: Sharma, R.K. & Devendra Handa (eds.), Revealing the Past: recent trends in art and archaeology. Prof. Ajay Mitra Shastri Commemoration Volume. Aryan Books, New Delhi. Vol. II, pp. 248–251.
- 2005 Commemorating Professor Ajay Mitra Shastri. in: Sharma, R.K. &Devendra Handa (eds.), Revealing the Past: recent trends in art and archaeology. Prof. Ajay Mitra Shastri Commemoration Volume. AryanBooks, New Delhi. Vol. I, lxii.
- 2006 The Avimuktakṣetra in Vārāṇasī. Its Origin and Early Development.Studies in the Skandapurān.a VI. in: Gaenszle, Martin & Jörg Gengnagel(eds.), Visualizing Space in Banaras : Images, Maps, and the Practice of Representation. Wiesbaden. pp. 23–39.
- 2006 A Theatre of Broken Dreams. Vidiśā in the Days of Gupta Hegemony.in: Brandtner, Martin & Shishir Kumar Panda (eds.), InterrogatingHistory. Essays for Hermann Kulke, Chapter 9. New Delhi. pp. 165–187.
- 2007 The Hindu Religion and War. in: King, Anna S (ed.), Indian Religions. Renaissance and Renewal. The Spalding Papers in Indic Studies. London.pp. 28–40.
- 2007 Human Sacrifice (Puruṣamedha), Construction Sacrifice and the Origin of the Idea of the ‘Man of the Homestead' (Vāstupuruṣa). in: Bremmer, Jan N. (ed.), The Strange World of Human Sacrifice. Leuven. pp. 179–194.
- 2007 Thanesar, the Pāśupata Order and the Skandapurāņa. Studies in the Skandapurāņa IX. in: Journal of Indological Studies 19 (2007), 1–16.
- 2007 Monuments to the Dead in Ancient North India. in: Indo-IranianJournal 50.1 (2007), 11–47.
- 2008 A Funerary Monument to Prabhāvatīguptā? in: Bautze-Picron, Claudine(ed.), Religion and Art: New Issues in Indian Iconography and Iconology. London 2008. pp. 81–91.
- 2008 Mansar. Pravarasena and his Capital: An Introduction. in: Bakker(ed.), Mansar. The Discovery of Pravareśvara and Pravarapura, Temple and Residence of the Vākāţaka King Pravarasena II. Groningen 2008, 1–120. Academia
- 2008 Mansar and its Eastern Neighbours. Mansar Architecture and the Temples in Nagarā and Dakṣiņa Kosala. in: Bakker (ed.), Mansar The Discovery of Pravareśvara and Pravarapura, Temple and Residence of the Vākāţaka King Pravarasena II.. Groningen 2008, 1–52. Academia
- 2008 Vārāņasī, Skandapurāņa, Tulsīdās—Mahāmantra no Rekishiteki Kenkyuu (in Japanese) (= Vārāņasī, the Skandapurāņa, and Tulsīdās. An investigation into the history of the Mahāmantra). in: Toyo University, Oriental Studies XLV, March, 2008, pp. 142–143.
- 2009 Rāma Devotion in a Śaiva Holy Place: The Case of Vārāņasī. Chapter 5 in:Pauwels, H.R.M. (ed.), Patronage and Popularisation, Pilgrimage and Procession. Channels of Transcultural Translation and Transmission in Early Modern South Asia. Papers in Honour of Monika Horstmann. Harrassowitz Verlag, Wiesbaden. pp. 67–80.
- 2009 Puruṣamedha, Manasarapuruṣa, Vāstupuruṣa. The image of Man in the Sacrificial Context. in: Journal of Indological Studies 20 & 21 (2008–09), 1–23.
- 2009 The So-called ‘Jaunpur Stone Inscription of Īśvaravarman.' in: Indo-IranianJournal 52.2–3 (2009), 207–216.
- 2010 The Gospel of Kauņḍinya: The Descent of God in Gujarat and the Practice of Imitating God. in: Dijkstra, Jitse, Justin Kroesen & Yme Kuiper (eds.), Myths, Martyrs, and Modernity. Studies in the History of Religions in Honour of Jan N.Bremmer. Brill, Leiden 2010, pp. 517–29. Numen Book Series 127.
- 2010 La collina di Rāma. Transgressione ed espiazione su una collina nel sud el'inadeguatezza delle sostituzioni [Rāma's Hill. Transgression and Atonementon a Hill in the South and the Inadequacy of Substitutes]. in: Pellizzari, Paolo(ed.), La bisaccia del pellegrino: fra evocazione e memoria, a cura di AmilcareBarbero e Stefano Piano. Atlas, Centro di Documentazione dei Sacri Monti, Monferrato.
- 2010 Trivikrama: Word and Statue. A new interpretation of Rāmagiri evidence (1).in: Acta Orientalia Academiae Scientiarum Hungaricae. Volume 63.3 (2010), 241–247.
- 2010 Rohitāgiri. in: Caracchi, Pinuccia et al. (eds.), Tīrthayātrā. Essays in Honour of Stefano Piano. Edizioni dell'Orso, Alessandria. pp. 15–26.
- 2010 Royal Patronage and Religious Tolerance. The Formative Period of Gupta–Vākāţaka Culture. in: Journal of the Royal Asiatic Society 20.4 (2010), 461–475.
- 2010 The Hindu Religion and War. in: Dijk, Jacobus van (ed.), Onder Orchideeën.Nieuwe Oogst uit de Tuin der Geesteswetenschappen te Groningen. Barkhuis Publishing, Groningen. pp. 7–17. [2nd edition of the 2007 publication].
- 2011 Origin and Spread of the Pāśupata Movement. About Heracles, Lakulīśaand Symbols of Masculinity. in: Tikkanen, Bertil & Albion M. Butters (eds.), Pūrvāparaprajñābhinandanam, East and West, Past and Present:Indological and Other Essays in Honour of Klaus Karttunen. Helsinki. Studia Orientalia 110. pp. 21–37.
- 2012 The Gupta-Vākāțaka Relationship. A new interpretation of Rāmagiri evidence (2). in: Religions of South Asia 5.1{2 (2011), 293–302.
- 2013 The Trivikrama Temple: A New Interpretation of Rāmagiri evidence (3).in: South Asian Studies 29.2 (2013), 169–76.
- 2013 The Temple of Maņḍaleśvarasvāmin. The Muņḍeśvarī Inscription of the Time of Udayasena Reconsidered. in Indo-Iranian Journal 56.3--4 (2013), 263–277.
- 2013 Composition and Spread of the Skandapurāņa. An Artist's Impression. Concluding Lecture of VVIK Indologendag 2013: The Study of the History of Hinduism in the Sanskrit Tradition. Leiden.
- 2014 An Enigmatic Figure from Kālanjara. The carrier of the vihangikā or ‘bangy.'Lecture presented at the 22nd conference of the European Association for SouthAsian Archaeology and Art (EASAA). Stockholm, Sweden 2014. Academia.
- 2015 Gateway to Kashmir. Lecture presented at Saivism and the Tantric Traditions.A symposium in Honour of Alexis G.J.S. Sanderson. Toronto, 28 March 2015. Academia.
- 2015 Trade of All Sorts. The Spread of Early Saivism along an Ancient CaravanRoute in Western India. Revised version of the presentation given at the ERC Synergy ‘Beyond Boundaries' seminar in the SOAS on 9 June 2015. In collaboration with Elizabeth Cecil (Brown, US). Academia.
- 2016 (together with Peter C. Bisschop) "The quest for the Pāśupata Weapon: the gateway of the Mahādeva Temple at Madhyamikā (Nagarī)." In: IIJ 59: 217–258.
- 2018 A Buddhist Foundation in Śārdīysa. A New Interpretation of the Schøyen Copper Scroll. in: IIJ 61: 1--19. DOI: 10.1163/15728536-06101001
- 2018 Obituary of Gerrit Jan Meulenbeld: Borne, 28 May 1928 – Bedum, 26 March 2017 †. in: IIJ 61: 97–110 DOI: 10.1163/15728536-06101002
- 2018 (together with Peter C. Bisschop) Pāśupatasūtras 1.7–9 with the Commentary of Kauṇḍinya. Academia.
- 2019 Foreword. in: Henk Bodewitz, Vedic Cosmology and Ethics, Selected Studies, edited by Dory Heilijgers, Jan Houben, Karel van Kooij. Brill, Leiden. pp. xi–xiii.
- 2020 Huns in Central and South Asia: a timeline (pp. xv–xviii); Introduction to X Indic Sources (pp. 276–81); X.2 Epigraphic Sources (pp. 316–62). in: Balogh, Dániel (ed.), Hunnic Peoples in Central and South Asia. Sources for their Origin and History. Barkhuis, Groningen.
- 2021 The Skandapurāṇa and Bāṇa's Harṣacarita. Studies in the Skandapurāṇa 13. in: Bisschop, Peter C. & Elizabeth A. Cecil (eds.), Primary Sources and Asian Pasts. De Gruyter, Berlin/Boston. Asia Beyond Boundaries Vol. 8. pp. 106–26. https://doi.org/10.1515/9783110674088-005

- 2021 Diversity and organization in Early Śaivism. in: De Simini, Florinda & Csaba Kiss (eds.), Śivadharmāmṛta. Essays on the Śivadharma and its Network. Università di Napoli L’Orientale Dipartimento Asia, Africa e Mediterraneo. The Śivadharma Project. Studies on the History of Śaivism II. Unior Press, Napoli. pp. 1–17. https://doi.org/10.6093/978-88-6719-228-1
- 2022 A Theatre of Broken Dreams 2.0. Vidiśā in the Days of Gupta Hegemony. in: Kulke, Hermann & B.P. Sahu (eds.), The Routledge Handbook of the State in Premodern India, Chapter 9. London & New York. pp. 191–207. https://doi.org/10.4324/9781003242062-12.
- 2022 Prabhākara. Sigillary and Epigraphic Evidence: Shall the Twain Meet? in: Bulletin de l'École Française d'Extrême-Orient, 107 (2021), pp. 71–86.
- 2024 An Intaglio Seal of Prabhākara. in: Tripathy, Byomkesh et al. (eds.), Banyan Tree. Dimensions of Indological Studies. (A Festschrift to Prof. L.S. Nigam). Bharati Prakashan, Varanasi. pp. 117–22.
- 2025 Tribute to a Famous Singer. A Statue Found at Nandivardhana (Nagardhan). in: Bulletin de l'École Française d’Extrême-Orient, 111 (2025), pp. 37–54.
- 2026 No Texts without Archæology — no Archæology without Texts. in: Filigenzi, Anna and Cristiano Moscatelli (eds), South Asian Archaeology and Art 2018. Papers presented at the 24th International Conference of the European Association for South Asian Archaeology and Art, held at the Monumental Complex of S. Domenico Maggiore, Naples, Italy 2–6 July. pp. 1–34.

== See also ==
- Dutch Indologists
- Indologists
