= Uttar Pradesh Sunni Central Waqf Board =

Autonomous governmental body in Uttar Pradesh, India

The Uttar Pradesh Sunni Central Waqf Board (or U.P. Sunni Waqf Board) is a body constituted under The Wakf Act, 1995 of the Government of India, for general superintendence of the affairs of Sunni Muslim waqf (charity) properties, waqf institutions of the Sunni Muslim community of the state of Uttar Pradesh in India. Its chairman is Zufar Ahmad Faruqi. The Sunni Waqf Board has been the main Muslim litigant in the Babri Masjid–Ram Janmabhoomi title dispute.

== Establishment ==
The state waqf boards were established by the state governments in view of the provisions of Section 13 of the Wakf Act, 1954.

India also has a Central Waqf Council to advise the government "on matters concerning the working of boards and the due administration of wakfs."

== Babri Masjid dispute ==
In February 2020, the government allotted 5 acres (2.0 ha) of agricultural land at Dhannipur in Ayodhya municipal corporation to the Uttar Pradesh Sunni Central Waqf Board as an alternative site for constructing a mosque, to replace the Babri Masjid that was demolished in 1992.
