= Joseph Tiefenthaler =

Austrian Jesuit missionary to India (1710–1785)

Joseph Tiefenthaler (or Tieffenthaler or Tieffentaller) (27 August 1710 – 5 July 1785) was a Jesuit missionary and one of the earliest European geographers to write about India.

== Life and travels ==
Tiefenthaler was born in Bozen, in the county of Tyrol, then in the Austrian empire. Not much is known of his early life and studies except that he spent two years in Spain. He entered the Society of Jesus on 9 October 1729, and went in 1740 to the East Indian mission.

Arriving in Goa, he was soon sent to be the Rector of the Jesuit High School of Agra. Agra was then the center of the so-called 'Mission of the Grand Moghul'. In 1747 he went to Narwar where he stayed for about 18 years.

To escape Prime Minister Pombal's order for all Jesuits to be expelled from Portuguese controlled areas (in 1759), he left and travelled around North India. He followed the entire course of the Ganges down to Calcutta, which had been newly established as a city by Job Charnock as a commercial settlement of the English. On returning to Agra in 1778, he received the news that the Society of Jesus, the religious order to which he belonged, had been suppressed by Pope Clement XIV. He stayed in India, and on his death in 1785 in Lucknow was buried in the mission cemetery in Agra.

== Works ==
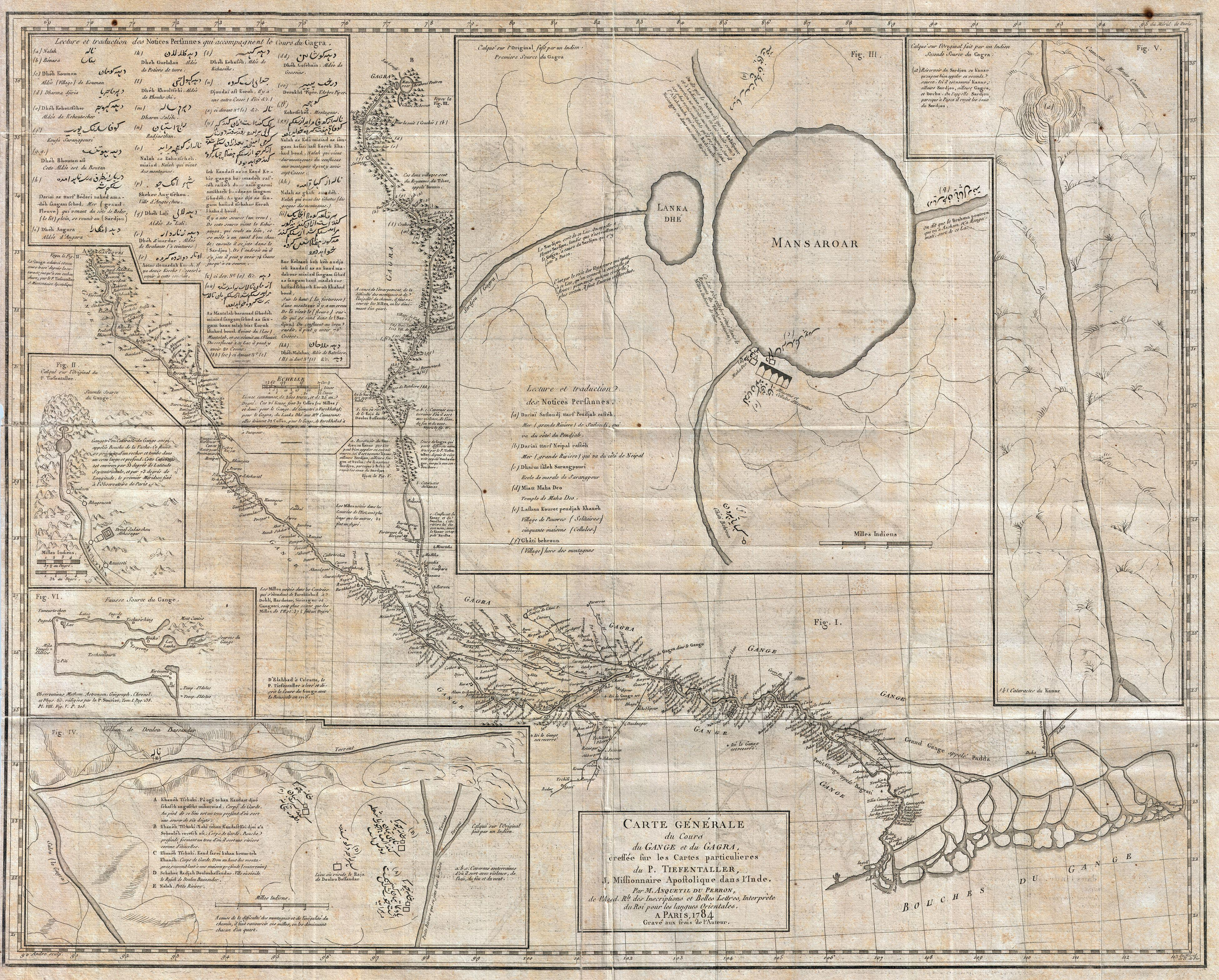
Tiefenthaler's map of the Ganges and Ghaghara rivers, 1784

Besides his native tongue he understood Latin, Italian, Spanish, French, Hindustani, Arabic, Persian, and Sanskrit.

In geography, he wrote a Descriptio Indiæ, a circumstantial description of the twenty-two provinces of India, of its cities, fortresses, and the most important smaller towns, together with an exact statement of geographical positions, calculated by means of a simple quadrant. The work also contains a large numbers of maps, plans, and sketches drawn by himself, and the list of geographical positions fills twenty-one quarto pages. He also prepared a large book of maps on the Ganges Basin, entitled: Cursus Gangæ fluvi Indiæ maximi, inde Priaga seu Elahbado Calcuttam usque ope acus magneticæ exploratus atque litteris mandatus aJ. T. S. J. (1765). The original map of the lower course of the river measures 15', that of the middle course, from Benares to Patna, measures 4' 3" square. In addition there is a map of similar dimensions of the Gagra, the whole accompanied by numerous notes, sketches of particular parts, and maps giving details. he also wrote a work on the regions containing the sources of the chief rivers of India.

In the field of religions he wrote Brahmanism, a work directed against the writings of the Irishman John Zephaniah Holwell and the Scotsman Alexander Dow. Others of his writings were on Indian polytheism, Indian asceticism, the religion of the Parsees, Islam, the relation of these religions to one another, etc. His writings in the department of the natural sciences are: astronomical observations on the sunspots and Zodiacal light, studies on Hindu astronomy, astrology, and cosmology, and descriptions and observations of the flora and fauna of India. He also wrote in Latin on the origin of Hindus and of their religion, an account in German of the expeditions of Nadir Shah to India, the deeds of the Mughal Shah Alam in Persian, and in French in incursions of the Afghans and the conquest of Delhi, and the contemporary history of India, 1757–64. In linguistics he wrote a Sanskrit-Parsee lexicon, treatises in Latin on the language of the Parsees, on the proper pronunciation of Latin, etc.

Tiefenthaler sent these works in manuscript partly to the Danish scholar Dr. Kratzenstein in Copenhagen, partly to the French orientalist and geographer A. H. Anquetil-Duperron (1731–1805). The latter praised the value and importance of the works, especially those on geography, in his address before the French Academy of Sciences (Journal des Scavans, Dec., 1776), and made the writing of Tiefenthaler partly accessible to the academic world in his Recherches hist. et géogr. sur l'Inde (1786), and also in his Carte général du cours du Gange et du Gagra dressée par les cartes particuliéres du P. Tieffenthaler (Paris, 1784). A part of the manuscripts in Copenhagen were obtained by the German scholar Johann Bernoulli of Berlin who used them in connection with the Recherches of Anquetil for the work Des Pater Joseph Tieffenthalers d. Ges. Jesu. und apost. Missionarius in Indien historisch-geographische Beschreibung von Hindustan . . . (3 vols., quarto, Berlin-Gotha, 1785–87). The greater part of the first two volumes is devoted to Tiefenthaler's writings, his maps, and sketches. the French edition, entitled Description hist. et géogr. de l'Inde . . . appeared in Berlin in three vols. (1786–91). A large part of his manuscripts are probably still extant in Paris and Copenhagen.

== See also ==
- List of Catholic clergy scientists
