= Killing of Babu Lal Vaishnav =

Killing of a priest in Rajasthan

- Date: 8 October 2020
- Location: Rajasthan, India
- Suspects: Kailash Meena

In October 2020, Babu Lal Vaishnav, a 50-year-old Hindu temple priest was killed in Bukna village, Rajasthan. Kailash Meena allegedly burnt Vaishnav alive after Vaishnav tried to stop Meena from trespassing on land belonging to the village temple.

== Incident ==
Vaishnav had around 5.2 acres of land which were given to him by the Radha Krishna temple trust as "Mandir Mafi" (for priestly duties in the temple). Vaishnav had planned to build a house on the land. He had the land leveled by an earth-mover to commence the construction of his house. The dominant Meena community disputed this and declared the land as their own. The conflict was taken to the village elders who ruled in favor of Vaishnav. But the accused, Kailash Meena started building his own hut on the land that the priest had leveled. This led to a fight. The priest before dying said six people including Kailash Meena poured petrol on him and set him on fire.

== Arrests and compensation ==
The main accused Kailash Meena was arrested within 24 hours of the incident by the Rajasthan police. The family members of the priest demanded compensation of Rs 50 lakh and a government job and refused to cremate the body until their demands are met.

== Reactions ==
The Chief minister of Rajasthan Ashok Gehlot declared that the guilty won't be spared. Union Minister Prakash Javadekar claimed that "law and order have gone for a toss in Rajasthan". BJP MP Rajyavardhan Singh Rathore attacked the Congress government in Rajasthan and claimed that neither the women nor the priests are safe in this state.

== See also ==
- Caste-related violence in India
- Death by burning
- Hindu priest
