= Rama Navami =

Hindu festival celebrating the birth of Shri Rama

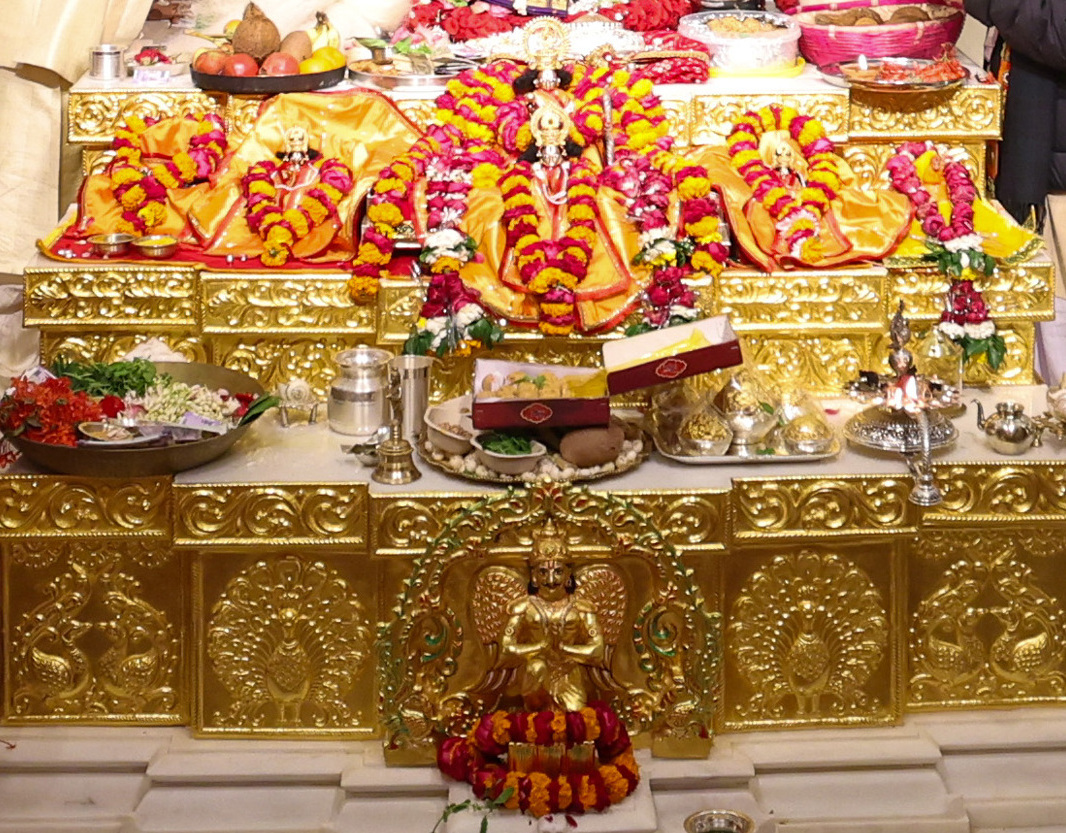
- Infant Rama Lalla Virajman at Ram Mandir, Ayodhya
- Type: Hindu
- Significance: Birthday of Rama
- Observances: Puja, vrata (fast), recitation of the Ramayana and its various versions, charity, and bhajan (devotional singing)
- Date: Chaitra Shukla Navami
- 2027 date: 15 April
- Duration: 1 Day
- Frequency: Annual
- Related to: Chaitra Navaratri, Hanuman Jayanti

Explanatory note on Hindu festival dates
- The Hindu calendar is lunisolar but most festival dates are specified using the lunar portion of the calendar. A lunar day is uniquely identified by three calendar elements: māsa (lunar month), pakṣa (lunar fortnight) and tithi (lunar day). Furthermore, when specifying the masa, one of two traditions are applicable, viz. amānta / pūrṇimānta. If a festival falls in the waning phase of the moon, these two traditions identify the same lunar day as falling in two different (but successive) masa. A lunar year is shorter than a solar year by about eleven days. As a result, most Hindu festivals occur on different days in successive years on the Gregorian calendar.

Rama Navami (Sanskrit: राम नवमी, romanized: Rāmanavamī) is a Hindu festival that celebrates the birth of Rama, a revered deity in Hinduism, also known as the seventh avatar of Vishnu. He is often held as an emblem within Hinduism for being an ideal king and human, through his righteousness, good conduct and virtue. The festival falls on the ninth day of the bright half (Shukla Paksha) of the lunar cycle of Chaitra (March–April), the first month in the Hindu calendar. It is also part of the Chaitra Navaratri festival in spring.

Rama Navami is celebrated across India with varying rituals and customs. These include devotional practices such as fasting, prayer, singing, recitations from the Ramayana, temple visits, processions, and music or dramatic performances. Charitable events and community meals are also organized. The festival is an occasion for reflecting on Rama's virtues.

Important celebrations on this day take place at Ayodhya's Ram Mandir and numerous Rama temples all over India. Ratha yatras (chariot processions) of Rama, Sita, Lakshmana, and Hanuman occur at several places. In Ayodhya, many take a dip in the sacred river Sarayu, and then visit the Rama temple.

== Birth ==
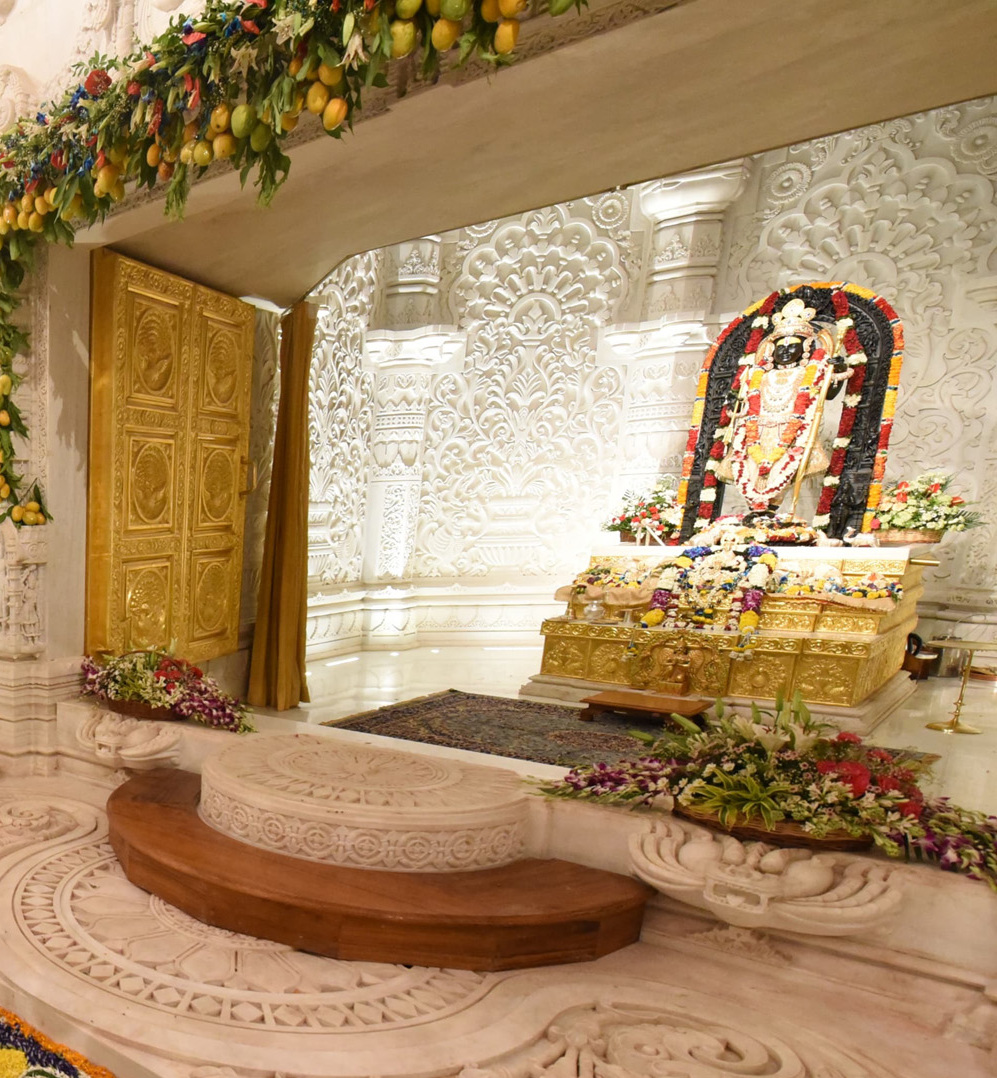
Balak Ram (idol) at Ram Janmabhoomi, Ayodhya

Details regarding the birth of Rama are mentioned in Valmiki's Ramayana and the Mahabharata. Rama was born to King Dasharatha and Queen Kausalya in the city of Ayodhya. King Dasharatha had three wives—Kausalya, Kaikeyi, and Sumitra– but remained sonless for many years. Desperate for an heir, Dasharatha organized a sacrifice to be conducted under the authority of the sage Rishyasringa, which concluded with a celestial figure that emerged from a fire with a pot of rice and milk. As instructed, the king divided the contents of the pot among his wives. As a result, Kausalya gave birth to Rama on the ninth day of the bright half (Shukla Paksha) of the lunar cycle of Chaitra (March–April), also known as Rama Navami. Furthermore, Kaikeyi gave birth to Bharata and Sumitra bore twins—Lakshmana and Shatrughna. Thus, with the birth of four sons, Dasharatha's desire was fulfilled.

Noting the significance of the birth of Ram, his infant form, Balak Ram (lit. 'Child Rama', IAST: Bālakarāma), also known as Ram Lalla, is the presiding deity of the Ram Mandir, the Hindu temple located at Ram Janmabhoomi, mythological birthplace of the Rama in Ayodhya, India.

Balak Rama deity (name was used by Tulsidas in the Rāmacaritamānasa) is housed in the sacred sanctum sanctorum (garbha gṛha) of the Ram Mandir, a traditional Nagara style temple. The murti (idol) was consecrated in an elaborate Prana pratishtha ceremony at Ram Mandir in Ayodhya in January 2024. Previously, the deity was referred to as Rām Lallā Virājamān until the construction of the Ram Mandir. In the Kavitāvali, Tulsidas uses the word Rām Lallā. Lāla or Lallā is an affectionate term for children in Braj Bhasha, the language of Tulsidas.

== Celebrations and rituals ==
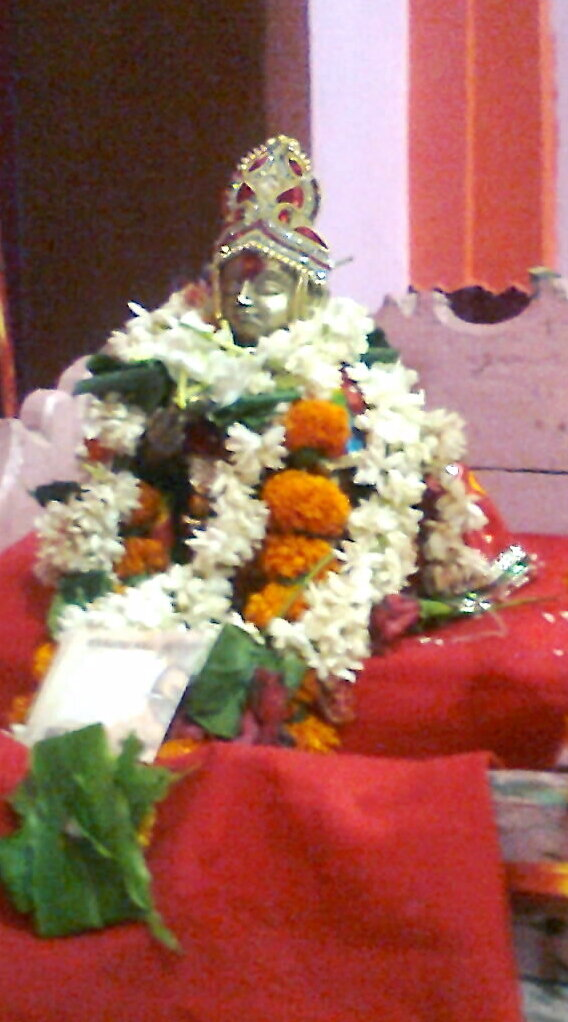
Infant Rama birth celebration at a temple in Chinawal, Maharashtra

A number of cities mentioned in the Ramayana legends about Rama's life observe major celebrations. These include Ayodhya (Uttar Pradesh), Rameswaram (Tamil Nadu), Bhadrachalam (Telangana) and Sitamarhi (Bihar).

The rituals and customs associated with Rama Navami vary from region to region throughout India. Many of these traditions include reading and listening to discourses from the Ramayana, organizing ratha yatras (chariot processions), charitable events, hosting a wedding procession (kalyanotsavam) of Rama and Sita, and offering reverence to Sita, Lakshmana, and Hanuman who have played important roles in Rama's life story. Surya, the Hindu solar deity, is also worshipped among some communities.

In Karnataka, Rama Navami is celebrated by local mandalis (organizations) and streets, distributing free panaka (a jaggery drink) and food. In Bengaluru, Karnataka, the Sree Ramaseva Mandali, R.C.T (R.) Chamrajpet, organizes a month-long classical music festival. According to the organization, the festival, now 80 years old, features Indian classical musicians of various religions from both the Carnatic (South Indian) and Hindustani (North Indian) traditions, who perform in tribute to Rama for the assembled audience.

In eastern Indian states such as Odisha, Jharkhand, and West Bengal, the Jagannath temples and regional Vaishnava community observe Rama Navami, and begin preparations for their annual Jagannath Ratha Yatra in summer.

Devotees associated with ISKCON fast throughout the day. A number of ISKCON temples introduced a more prominent celebration of the occasion of the holiday with the view of addressing needs of growing native Hindu congregation. It was however a notable calendar event on the traditional Gaurabda calendar with a specific additional requirement of fasting by devotees.

On April 17, 2024, the first Rama Navami after the consecration of Ayodhya's Ram Temple was celebrated by thousands of devotees across India. On this occasion, the Ram Temple witnessed a unique event at noon as the forehead of the Ram Lalla murti was anointed with a ray of sunlight, known as Surya Tilak. Scores of devotees watched the live-streaming of the event across the globe.

== Spiritual Significance ==
Rama Navami is not only a celebration of the birth of Lord Rama but also holds deep spiritual significance in Hindu tradition. The festival underscores the ideals of dharma (righteousness), devotion, and the pursuit of truth, as exemplified by Rama's life. According to Dr. Yatendra Sharma, "Rama Navami inspires devotees to reflect on the virtues of Lord Rama and encourages the practice of humility, compassion, and adherence to one's duties, serving as a reminder to lead a life guided by moral principles." The observance of Rama Navami, through fasting, recitation of scriptures, and community celebrations, is seen as an opportunity for spiritual renewal and the strengthening of ethical values within society.

=== Literature ===
During Rama Navami, reading or listening from literature about Rama is a common practice. Reading the entire Ramayana (Hindu epic entailing the adventures of Rama) for a week leading up to Rama Navami is organized. The earliest version of the text was composed by the sage Valmiki.

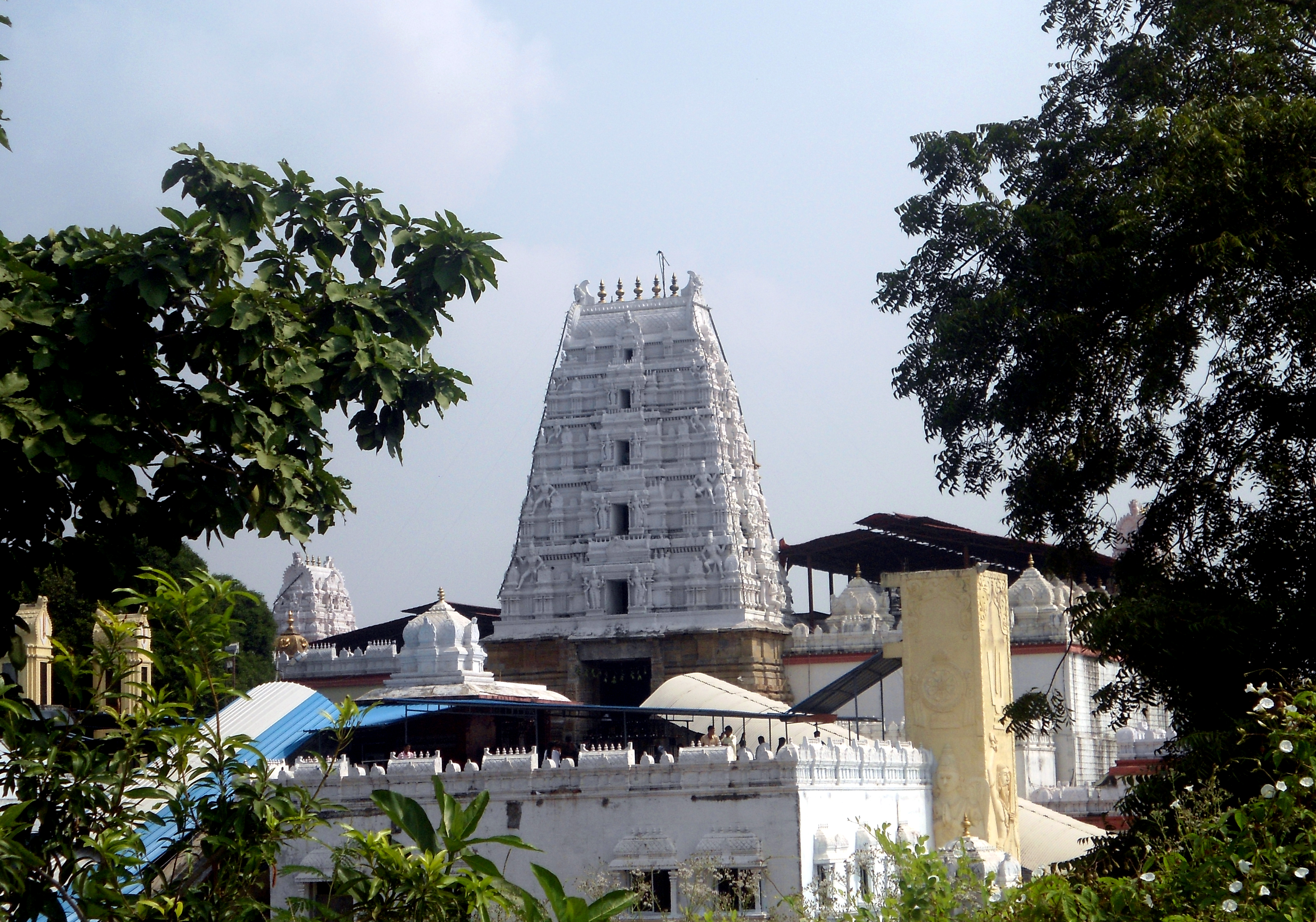
Bhadrachalam temple in Telangana is one of the major Rama Navami celebration sites.

Tulsidas's Ramcharitmanas, a later version of the Ramayana written in the vernacular of that time, is also popularly recited. The start of the composition of the Ramcharitmanas began on Rama Navami.

=== Drama ===
A public dramatic performance, known as Ramlila, is annually hosted on the festivals of Rama Navami and Vijayadashami. Ramlila encapsulates the story of Rama through music, drama, dance and various other mediums. The enactments of Ramlila are inspired by the Tulsidas's Ramcharitmanas.

== Outside of India ==
Rama Navami is one of the Hindu festivals that is celebrated by the Indian diaspora with roots in Uttar Pradesh and other states. The descendants of Indian indentured servants who were forced to leave India due to famines and then promised jobs in colonial South Africa before 1910 in British-owned plantations and mines, and thereafter lived under the South African apartheid regime, continued to celebrate Rama Navami by reciting the Ramayana and by singing bhajans of Tyagaraja and Bhadrachala Ramdas. The tradition continues in contemporary times in the Hindu temples of Durban every year.

Similarly, in Trinidad and Tobago, Guyana, Suriname, Jamaica, other Caribbean countries, Mauritius, Malaysia, Singapore, Denmark and many other countries with Hindu descendants of colonial-era indentured workers forced to leave British India have continued to observe Rama Navami along with their other traditional festivals.

It is also celebrated by Hindus in Fiji and Fijian Hindus who have re-migrated elsewhere.

ISKCON, a Hindu sect founded in the United States, celebrates Ram Navami within its temples.

== See also ==
- List of Hindu festivals
- Rama Navami riots
- Sita Navami
