= Ram Mandir Dhwajarohan =

Ceremony of hoisting Lord Rama's sacred flag on Ram Mandir

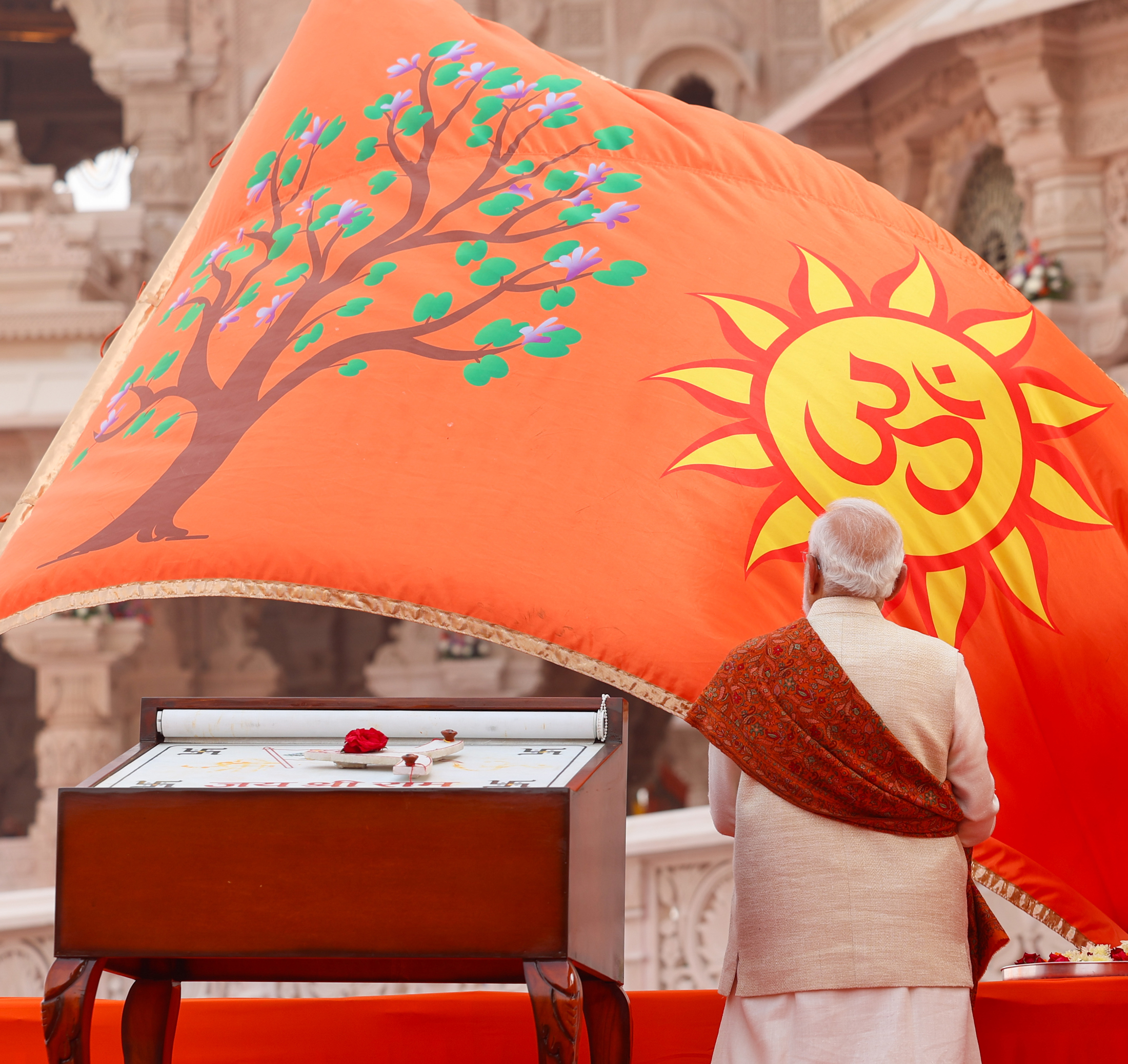
- Prime Minister Narendra Modi standing before the saffron flag featuring the 'Om' symbol within a glowing Sun and the Kovidāra tree during the Ram Mandir consecration ceremony in Ayodhya
- Native name: राम मंदिर ध्वजारोहण
- English name: Ram Mandir Flag Hoisting
- Date: November 25, 2025
- Time: 11:45 am – 12:29 pm (Abhijit Muhurat) (IST)
- Venue: Ram Mandir
- Location: Ayodhya, Uttar Pradesh, India; 26.7956°N 82.1943°E
- Also known as: Ram Dharma Dhwajarohan
- Type: Religious, Ceremonial
- Theme: Dharma Dhwaja; Purnahuti (Final culmination)
- Cause: Completion of the temple's main spire (Shikhar)
- Patrons: Narendra Modi; Yogi Adityanath; Mohan Bhagwat
- Organised by: Shri Ram Janmabhoomi Teerth Kshetra Trust
- Participants: Narendra Modi (Prime Minister); Mohan Bhagwat (RSS Chief); Yogi Adityanath (Chief Minister); Anandiben Patel (Governor); Vedic Acharyas and Priests
- Outcome: Installation of the 42-foot flagstaff and hoisting of the Dharma Dhwaja
- Flag Dimensions: 22 ft × 11 ft (Triangle)
- Flag Material: Specialized parachute fabric
- Key Symbols: Sun, Om, Kovidara Tree
- Hoisting of the sacred Dharma Dhwaja flag on the top Shikhar of Ram Janmabhoomi Mandir

Ram Mandir Dhwajarohan (Devanagari: राम मंदिर ध्वजारोहण) or Ram Mandir Flag Hoisting was the ceremonial raising of the sacred flag (Dharma Dhwaj) on November 25, 2025, atop the 161-foot (49 m) gold-plated spire of the Shri Ram Janmabhoomi Mandir. The temple is situated on the banks of the Sarayu River in Ayodhya, Uttar Pradesh, India. The ceremony was led by Prime Minister Narendra Modi.

== Historical context ==
Following the Supreme Court verdict that awarded the disputed land for the construction of the temple, Prime Minister Narendra Modi performed the bhoomi pujan (groundbreaking ceremony) on August 5, 2020. The temple was inaugurated on January 22, 2024, marked by the pran pratishtha (consecration ceremony) of Ram Lalla.

Although the temple was opened to devotees following the consecration in January 2024, construction of the temple's main spire remained unfinished. By November 25, 2025, the construction of the main spire, designed in the North Indian Nagara architectural style, was completed. The installation of a 42-foot (13 m) flagstaff atop this 161-foot (49 m) spire marked the official conclusion of the temple’s structural construction. Prime Minister Modi characterized the flag-hoisting ceremony as the purnahuti (final culmination) of a 500-year yajna (sacred endeavor).

November 25 coincided with Vivaha Panchami, celebrated as the wedding anniversary of Lord Ram and Goddess Sita. According to the Hindu calendar, in 2025, the Panchami Tithi commenced at 9:22 pm on November 24 and continued until 10:56 pm on November 25. Within this duration, the Abhijit Muhurat (11:45 am – 12:29 pm) is regarded as an auspicious window for sacred activities. Notably, both the bhoomi pujan and the pran pratishtha of the Ram Mandir were also performed during this timeframe.

== Dharma Dhwaja ==
Dharma Dhwaj (lit. flag of dharma) is the religious flag called dhvaja installed atop the Ram Mandir at Ayodhya, Uttar Pradesh, India. The flag-hoisting marked the ritual completion of the temple’s construction during the formal Dhwajarohan ceremony held on 25 November 2025. The Dharma Dhwaj bears sacred symbols — the radiant Sun, the sacred syllable “Om”, and the Kovidara tree — signifying spiritual heritage, Lord Rama’s lineage, and traditional Hindu symbolism. The saffron flag — measuring 22 feet × 11 feet — was hoisted on a 42-foot flagpole rising from the temple spire, as part of the renovation and finalization process of the temple complex.

The focal point of the ceremony was the saffron standard known as the Dharma Dhwaja, hoisted atop the temple's spire. According to guidelines from the Indian Ministry of Defence and most authoritative sources, the flag is a right-angled triangle measuring 22 feet (6.7 m) in length and 11 feet (3.4 m) in width, though some media reports cited dimensions of 20 feet by 10 feet.

Because the temple spire stands at 161 feet (49 m), where wind velocities are significantly higher, the flag was fashioned from a specialized parachute fabric. A manufacturer based in Ahmedabad stated that the flag can withstand gale-force winds of up to 200 kilometers per hour (120 mph), although other sources indicate it was tested for wind speeds of 60 km/h (37 mph). To accommodate these conditions, the flag is mounted on a 42-foot (13 m) flagpole equipped with a specialized 360-degree ball-bearing mechanism.

The saffron expanse of the flag features three prominent symbols embroidered in golden thread: the Sun, the ॐ (Om) symbol, and the kovidara tree. The Sun represents Lord Ram's lineage, the Suryavansha (Solar Dynasty); Om signifies the primordial cosmic sound representing creation, preservation, and dissolution; and the kovidara tree marks the revival of a lost emblem from the ancient royal standard of Ayodhya.

=== History ===
The idea of a dharma dhwaj is rooted in long‑standing Hindu temple practice, where flags or banners are raised on temple spires to denote the active presence and protection of the presiding deity. In this context, the Dharma Dhwaj of Ayodhya's Ram Mandir is intended to signify that Lord Rama is enthroned at his traditional birthplace and that the construction of the temple has reached ritual completion.

The flag was hoisted on 25 November 2025, coinciding with the observance of Vivaha Panchami, a festival associated with the divine marriage of Rama and Sita. The ceremony, held within the Ram Mandir complex, was led by Indian prime minister Narendra Modi in the presence of religious leaders, political dignitaries and invited devotees.

=== Design and symbolism ===
The Dharma Dhwaj is a saffron‑coloured, right‑angled triangular flag mounted on a mast fixed to the main shikhara of the Ram Mandir. Saffron (bhagwa) is traditionally associated with renunciation, sacrifice and commitment to dharma, and is widely used in Hindu religious and monastic contexts.

The flag carries several prominent symbols:

- a stylised Sun (Surya), representing the Solar dynasty to which Lord Rama belongs, and symbolising illumination, vitality and the sustaining power of righteousness;
- the sacred syllable Om (ॐ), denoting the primordial sound and the essence of Vedic and Upanishadic spiritual tradition;
- a sacred tree motif, often identified with the Kovidara or a similar auspicious tree, symbolising shelter, continuity and the flourishing of dharma across generations.

=== Flagstaff and engineering ===
The Dharma Dhwaj is mounted on a tall metallic mast anchored to the superstructure of the Ram Mandir. At the height of 161 feet, the flag is 22 feet long and 11 feet wide. It is made of parachute-grade fabric and is designed to withstand harsh weather and strong wind up to 60 kmph. It is designed by Gujarati artisans using high‑strength materials such as premium silk threads along with modern engineering methods to retain the traditional appearance of a temple dhwaja‑stambha. The mast in Ayodhya as a custom‑fabricated, heavy structure equipped with a mechanised system for raising and lowering the flag, blending ritual requirements with contemporary safety standards..

The main shikhara of the temple measures 161 feet in height, above which a 42-foot custom-fabricated flagpole was installed to mount the Dharma Dhwaj. The mast incorporates a motorised raising mechanism and a 360-degree rotating assembly to allow the flag to align with shifting winds and prevent tangling. The final flag installation as a fusion of traditional temple dhwaja-stambha design with contemporary structural engineering.

=== Religious significance ===
The Dhwajarohan (flag-hoisting) ceremony at Shri Ram Janmabhoomi Mandir took place on 25 November 2025, when a saffron banner called Dharma Dhwaj was hoisted atop the temple’s spire. The sacred symbols of the Sun, Om, and the “Kovidara” tree (or Kovidar tree) draw on religious/ancestral symbolism as per the Temple Trust.

The flag-hoisting followed several days of religious rituals (yajna, Navagraha worship, chanting of Vedic mantras and recitation of scriptures) conducted by priests from Ayodhya and Kashi under the direction of the temple trust, ahead of the formal ceremony. The Dhwajarohan is marked as the “formal completion” of the temple complex. It signifies as the opening of all entrances and readiness of the temple for full ritual functioning.

== Kovidara tree ==
Scientifically designated as Bauhinia variegata, the kovidara tree belongs to the Leguminosae family. In various Indian vernaculars, it is commonly referred to as Raktakanchan or Kanchan. Ancient Ayurvedic treatises, the Charaka Samhita and the Sushruta Samhita, explicitly refer to it as 'Kovidara,' noting that its bark, flowers, and roots are used to treat diverse ailments.

The tree's historical association with the royal standard was rediscovered by Indologist Lalit Mishra during his research into an ancient illustrated manuscript of the Ramayana from the Mewar School. Upon observing a distinct tree depicted on the flag of Ayodhya, he consulted experts from Banaras Hindu University (BHU), who identified it as the kovidara. Mishra subsequently traced a specific textual reference to this emblem in the Ayodhya Kanda of the Valmiki Ramayana. In the 84th sarga (canto), 3rd shloka (verse), as Bharata journeys to Chitrakoot to persuade Rama to return, Lakshmana identifies him from a distance solely by the insignia on his chariot:

Original Sanskrit

यथा तु खलु दुर्बुद्धिर्भरत स्स्वयमागतः।
स एष हि महाकायः कोविदारध्वजो रथे॥

IAST transcription

yathā tu khalu durbuddhirbharata ssvayamāgataḥ |
sa eṣa hi mahākāyaḥ kovidāradhvajo rathe

English translation

It appears that the evilminded Bharata himself has come here.
The emblem of a huge kovidara tree is seen on his chariot.

According to Hindu tradition, the sage Kashyapa created the kovidara by hybridizing the celestial mandara tree with the terrestrial parijata.

Following the death of King Brihadbala of Ayodhya in the Kurukshetra War, the city was stripped of its former glory, and over time, the memory of this royal standard faded. While the poet Kalidasa referenced the kovidara flower in his literary works, he made no allusion to its significance as a heraldic symbol.

== Events and rituals ==
To mark the occasion, the city of Ayodhya and the temple complex were adorned with nearly 100 tons of flowers. Security was tightened across the city, featuring the deployment of approximately 6,970 security personnel, including ATS commandos, NSG snipers, and the Rapid Action Force. While the temple remained closed to the general public for the day, special access passes were arranged for invited dignitaries.

Ceremonial rituals commenced on November 21. Dr. Anil Mishra, a member of the Shri Ram Janmabhoomi Teerth Kshetra Trust, accompanied by his wife, officiated as the Pradhan Yajman (chief host) for the Navagraha Puja and the sacrificial yajna. The festivities included a Kalash Yatra, a procession wherein thousands of women carried sacred water collected from the Sarayu River. On the day of the flag hoisting, the sanctity of the occasion was upheld by 21 Vedic Acharyas and 100 priests, who engaged in continuous Vedic chanting and ritual sacrifices.

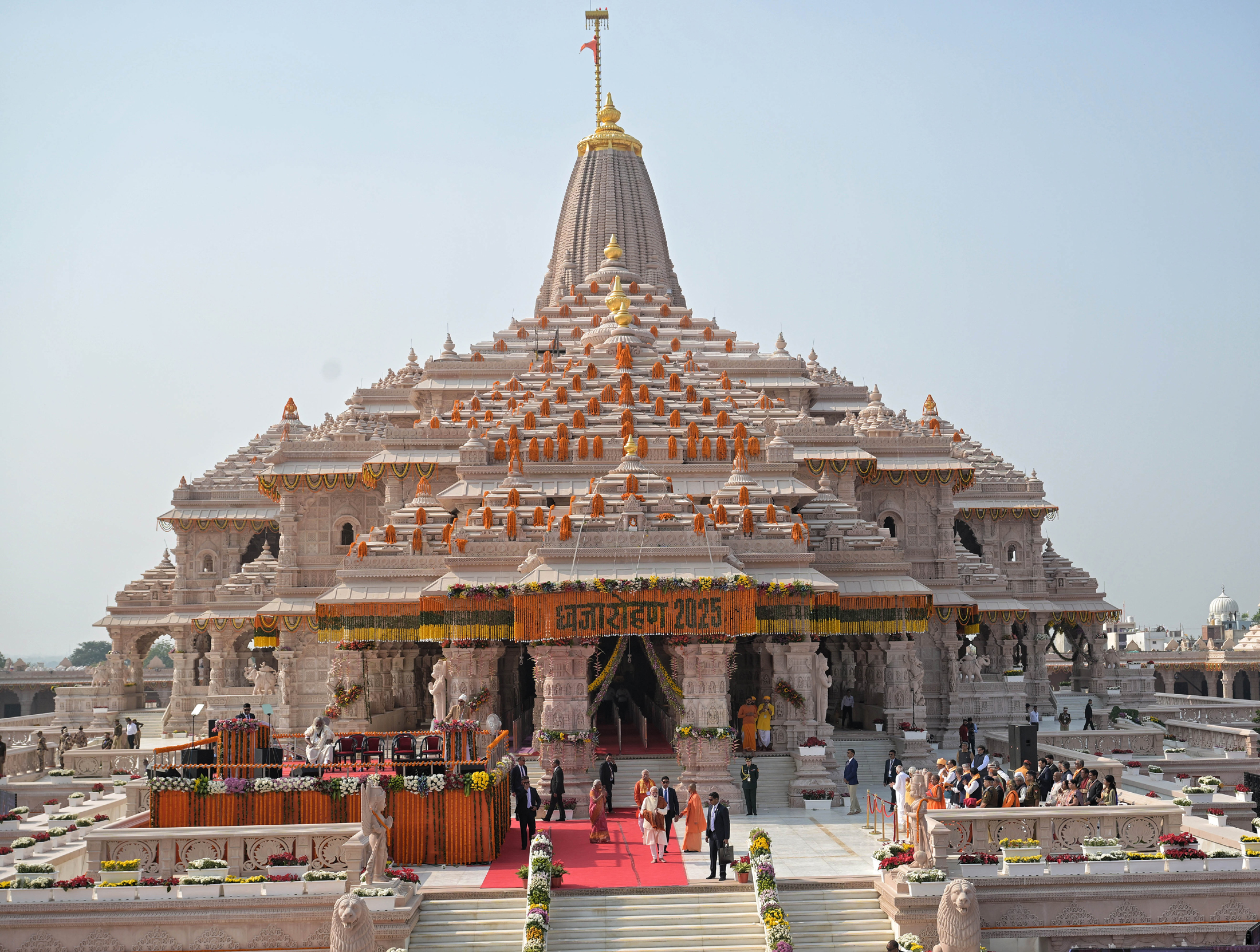
View of the decorated Shri Ram Janambhoomi Mandir during the ceremony of the Dhwajarohan

On the morning of November 25, Prime Minister Narendra Modi landed at Ayodhya Airport, where he was received by Chief Minister Yogi Adityanath and Governor Anandiben Patel. From there, he proceeded to the temple premises via a roadshow. Crowds of devotees lining the route welcomed him with chants of Jai Shri Ram and showers of flower petals.

The Prime Minister first offered prayers at Hanumangarhi before visiting the newly constructed Sapta Mandir complex (shrines dedicated to Maharishi Valmiki, Vashishtha, Vishwamitra, Agastya, Shabari, Nishadraj, and Ahalya). Subsequently, he performed a special puja and aarti within the Garbhagriha (sanctum sanctorum) of Ram Lalla.

As the auspicious Abhijit Muhurat approached, just prior to 12:00 pm, the Prime Minister ascended to the temple's third floor. Using a remote-control mechanism, he formally hoisted the Dharma Dhwaja atop the 161-foot (49 m) spire. This moment was marked by flower petals showered from helicopters, while the air resonated with the blowing of conch shells and the ringing of bells. At this culmination, the Prime Minister was flanked by RSS Chief Mohan Bhagwat and Chief Minister Yogi Adityanath.

=== Prime Minister's address ===
Following the flag-hoisting ceremony, Prime Minister Modi addressed the assembly. He spoke about history, colonialism, and the future of India. He declared, "Today, the city of Ayodhya is witnessing another turning point in India’s cultural consciousness. Today, all of India, the entire world, is filled with the divine presence of Ram. There are unparalleled contentment, boundless gratitude, and immense supernatural joy in the heart of every devotee of Ram. The wounds of centuries are healing, the pain of centuries is finding an end today, the resolution of centuries is achieving success today. Today marks the final offering of a yajna whose fire burned for 500 years."

In his address, the Prime Minister invoked British historian Thomas Babington Macaulay. He asserted that the education system introduced by Macaulay 190 years ago constituted a conspiracy designed to sever Indians from their cultural roots. Identifying the year 2035, marking the bicentenary of 'Macaulay’s Minute' as a critical milestone, he urged that within the next decade, India must liberate itself from the shackles of inferiority and the colonial mindset.

Drawing upon the symbolism of the kovidara tree, he remarked, "The Kovidar tree reminds us that when we forget our identity, we lose ourselves. And when identity returns, the nation’s self-confidence also returns."

=== Message of inclusivity ===
Representatives from indigenous tribal communities hailing from Sonbhadra and other forested regions were invited to attend the ceremony. This initiative was conceived to commemorate the relationship Lord Ram shared with forest dwellers and tribal populations during his exile, as chronicled in the Ramayana.

Iqbal Ansari, one of the principal litigants in the Babri Masjid title suit, attended the event at the invitation of the Trust. Expressing his sentiments, he remarked, "I am delighted to attend the programme. Ayodhya is a city of harmony."

== Reactions ==
=== National ===
- Congress leader and former MP Rashid Alvi alleged that by hoisting the saffron flag at the Ram Janmabhoomi temple in Ayodhya, Modi was attempting to stoke religious sentiments to secure political gains in the 2027 Uttar Pradesh elections. He further questioned whether Modi would ever hoist a similar flag at a mosque, a gurdwara, or a church.

=== International ===
- Israel’s Ambassador to India, Reuven Azar, extended his greetings to India on "restoring such an important civilizational symbol."

==== India-Pakistan exchange ====
On November 25, the Foreign Office of Pakistan issued a statement formally condemning the event. The statement alleged that, driven by "Hindutva ideology," concerted efforts were underway in India to erase the religious sites and cultural heritage of Muslims.

The Government of India issued a rebuttal to these remarks. Randhir Jaiswal, the Official Spokesperson for the Ministry of External Affairs, stated, "We have seen the reported remarks and reject them with the contempt they deserve." He further asserted, "As a country with a deeply stained record of bigotry, repression, and systemic mistreatment of its minorities, Pakistan has no moral standing to lecture others. Rather than delivering hypocritical homilies, Pakistan would do better to turn its gaze inwards and focus on its own abysmal human rights record."

== See also ==
- Ram Mandir
- Ram Janmabhoomi
- Ayodhya
- Vivaha Panchami
- Dhvaja
