= Surya Tilak =

Ritual of Lord Rama

Surya Tilak (Devanagari: सूर्य तिलक, Romanised: Sūrya Tilaka) also known as Surya Abhishek is the modern technological ritual of directing a beam of sunlight onto the forehead of the Ram Lalla idol within the Ram Janmabhoomi Mandir in Ayodhya on the occasion of Ram Navami. The first Surya Tilak was held on 17 April 2024. It is the collaborative event guided by the traditional Vedic rituals and supported by the modern scientific engineering. It is a display of modern science being used to enhance a religious and spiritual event.

== History ==
The ritual of Surya Tilak was first demonstrated on 17 April 2024 at the Ram Mandir in Ayodhya. It is a scientific engineering demonstration. It was conducted by the team of CSIR-CBRI, Roorkee along with Indian Institute of Astrophysics, Bangalore.

The second Surya Tilak was demonstrated on 6 April 2025 at the Ram Mandir. The phenomenon of the Surya Tilak was observed for approximately 4 minutes. The maximum luminescence was observed for approximately 2-3 minutes.
