= Hindu priest =

Priesthood class in Hinduism

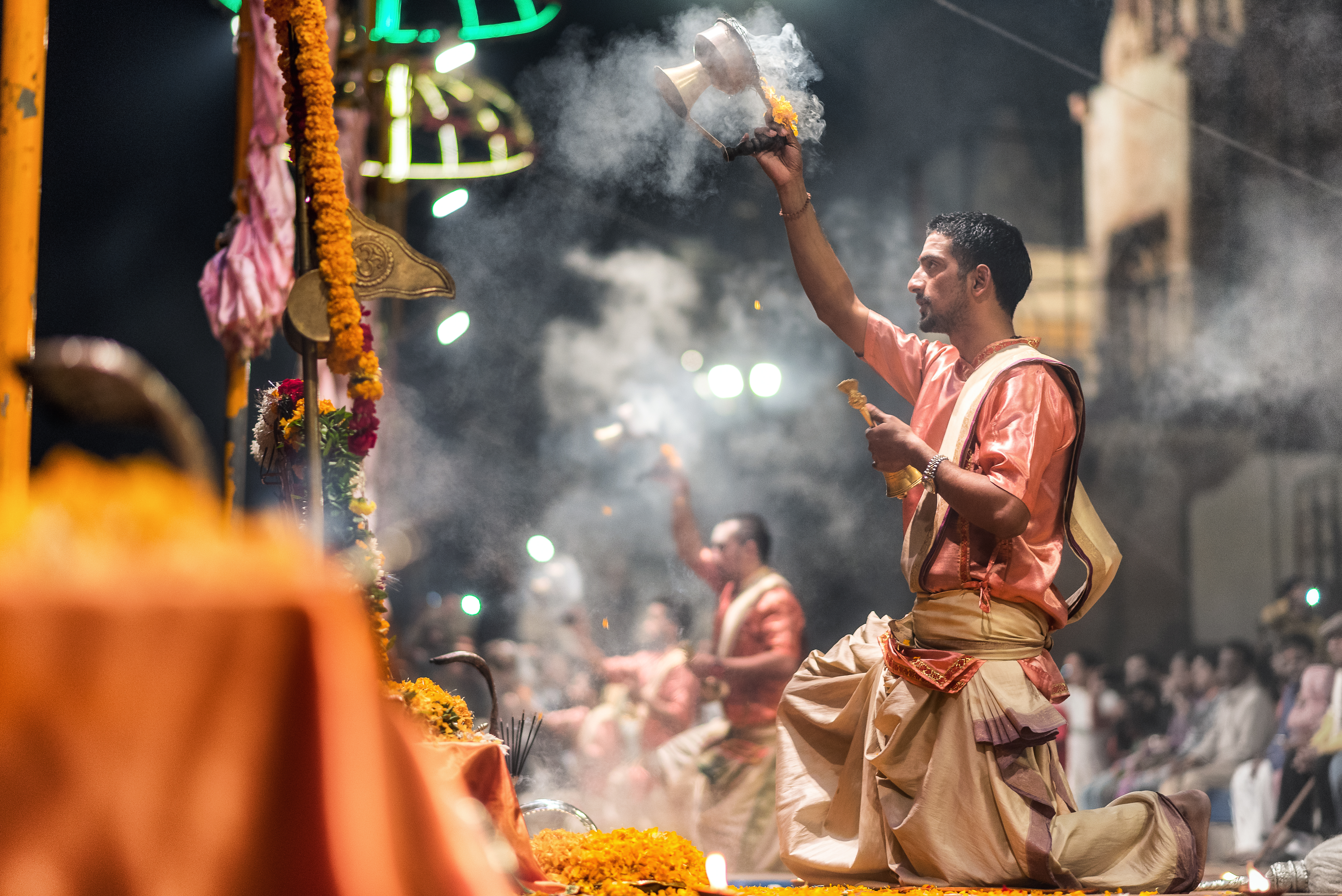
Pujaris performing the arti ritual at Varanasi

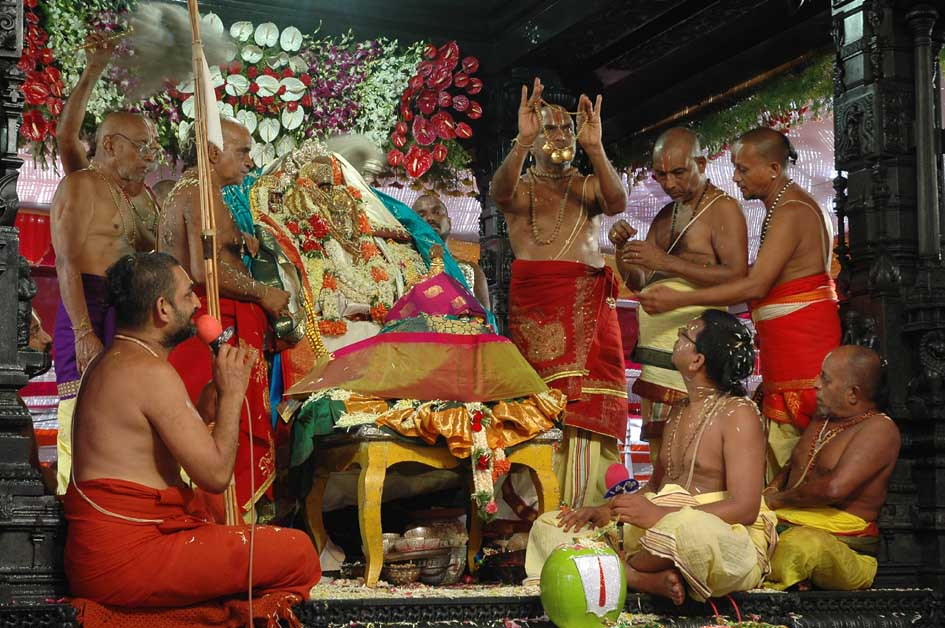
Purohitas during a procession of Perumal (Vishnu)

A Hindu priest may refer to either of the following

- A Pujari or an Archaka is a Hindu temple priest.
- A Purohita or Pandit officiates and performs rituals and ceremonies, and is usually linked to a specific family or, historically, a dynasty.

Traditionally, priests have predominantly come from the Brahmin varna, whose male members are designated for the function in the Hindu texts.

Hindu priests are known to perform prayer services, often referred to as puja that often involves prasad.

== History ==
The origins of Hindu priesthood may be traced back to the Vedic religion, where the Brahmin varna was designated as the teachers of the Vedas as well as members of the priesthood class among the Indo-Aryans. While the Brahmin community also engaged in other trades, they were highly discouraged in pursuits that were not religious, and texts such as the Manusamhita instructed such individuals to be treated as though they were Shudras. In the cosmology myth that was conceived in several Hindu scriptures such as the Puranas, the Brahmin class emerged first from the mouth of Purusha, the concept of divinity that permeated the entire universe in the form of a human being. They were hence religiously designated as members of the foremost varna, with their duties and means of livelihood instructed to them by God.

The purohitas of kings were responsible for overseeing communal sacrifices and rituals, and the two elites of the society had a mutually beneficial relationship: The kings owed their legitimacy as rulers to the Brahmin class, who served as the purohitas, and the Brahmins owed the kings for their acquired status and political influence. Cruelty against members of the priesthood class was a high offence, and rules against such acts were strictly instituted. The word of the Brahmin also generally prevailed in situations of conflict. The sociologist Max Weber was of the opinion that the central feature of Indian society was the importance of the Brahmins, and held that the status acquired by the class due to their association with the priesthood was unrivalled anywhere else in the world.

With the rise of Buddhism, the power of the Brahmin priesthood class started to wane. This is likely due to the Buddhist monastic notion that one's right conduct made one a Brahmin, rather than the Hindu notion that is based on birth. However, due to the fact the new heterodox movement made no attempt to oppose the varna system, the role of Brahmins as performers of religious rites survived. With their authority fading, forever, the class intensified the process of the Hindu synthesis, where the assimilation of popular cults led to the emergence of Vaishnavism and Shaivism as the dominant traditions.

== Functions ==
The primary responsibility of members of the priesthood class is to conduct daily prayers (puja) at the local temple and officiate Hindu rituals and ceremonies. A pujari assumes that all visitors to their temple wish to bear witness to a darshana, an auspicious vision of the murti, the temple idol, that serves as a representation of a given deity within the sanctum sanctorum. They perform daily pujas for the veneration of the deity, as well as for bestowing the deity's blessings upon the gathered devotees, where they prominently present an arti (lighted camphor upon a plate) that is ritually circled, facing the murti. After performing the puja by chanting the sacred mantrams, ringing the prayer bell, and sometimes by reciting the sthala purana (a regional Hindu legend that explains the significance of the temple), the pujari blesses the devotees by offering them prasadam (consecrated offerings of food), charanamritam or tirtham (water that was previously used to wash the feet of the murti), satari (a golden or silver crown that is placed upon the devotees' head, bearing an imprint of the murti's feet), and tilakam (sandalwood paste, kumkumam, vibhuti that is worn on the devotees' forehead). Tulasi leaves and the beverage panakam may also be offered. The pujaris ritually consecrate offerings of fruits and flowers brought by adherents and return them, if requested.

Individuals who wish to profess priesthood undertake a long course of study under a guru, and primarily study the Vedas, Dharmashastras, law, grammar, and the puja mantras that are usually learned from the Puranas. Priests, through their extended knowledge of religious literature, such as the Bhagavad Gita and the Ramayana, attempt to encourage the Hindu community's devotion to Hindu deities.

During Hindu festivals, as well as traditional events such as weddings, the sacred thread ceremony, kumbhabhishekams, antyesti, and special deity-specific ceremonies, priests may be called upon to conduct pujas. In order to perform a puja, the priests are required to have prior skills and knowledge. To be a qualified priest, they must know the required chants (mantrams and stotrams) fluently in Sanskrit, and be familiar with the materials required to perform the puja for various ceremonies and rituals. Pandits, from an early age, are trained to memorise hymns in order to chant them during rituals and ceremonies without aid. Receiving assistance to remember hymns and chants was historically frowned upon, as priests were expected to recite the hymns through memory.

== Varna ==
The broad functions of the Hindu priesthood, such as expertise of the scriptures, as well as performing religious ceremonies, are allocated to those born in the Brahmin class in the Manusmriti:

Brāhmaṇas of pure Brāhmaṇa-birth, intent upon their duties, should duly perform the six acts in due order.
Teaching, studying, sacrificing for oneself, sacrificing for others, giving and receiving gifts are the six functions for the ‘first born’.

— Attributed to Manu, Manusmriti, Verse 10.74-10.75

While the functions of the Hindu priesthood have historically, as well as presently, been deeply associated with the Brahmin varna in India and Nepal, there do exist several Hindu communities who have sought to appoint their own members as priests for officiating ceremonies and religious practices. The reformist Lingayat sect of Karnataka reject the varna system mentioned in the scriptures, and do not employ Brahmins as priests. In the Dravidian folk religion, whose deities have been assimilated to some degree by mainstream Hinduism, the village deities are officiated by non-Brahmin priests, and the traditions are often non-Brahmanical in nature, including the practice of blood sacrifices and ritual slaughter.

== Lifestyle ==
The daily lifestyle of Hindu priests traditionally consists of performing prayers as much as four to six times per day, which vary according to the religious tradition they subscribe to. Every morning, pujaris are in charge of performing the abhishekam (bathing the murti with water and milk, and clothing the idol with traditional wear and jewellery). Priests who are not tied to temples commute to the homes of Hindu adherents, where they perform homams, yajnams, pujas, and a number of religious ceremonies. Priests generally abstain from the consumption of meat and alcohol, as these are perceived as ritually polluting. They are traditionally expected to not charge for their services, and are expected to subsist through the alms and danam (charitable offerings) offered by the Hindu community. Priests are also not generally required to practise celibacy.

In South India, pujaris do not usually wear garments above their waists within, or sometimes even outside the temple, and are hence easily identified by their wearing of the sacred thread. In several regions of India, such as Kashmir and northern India, priests maintain a shikha, only a tuft of hair upon their heads, citing the practice in preceptors such as Kashyapa.

== Gallery ==
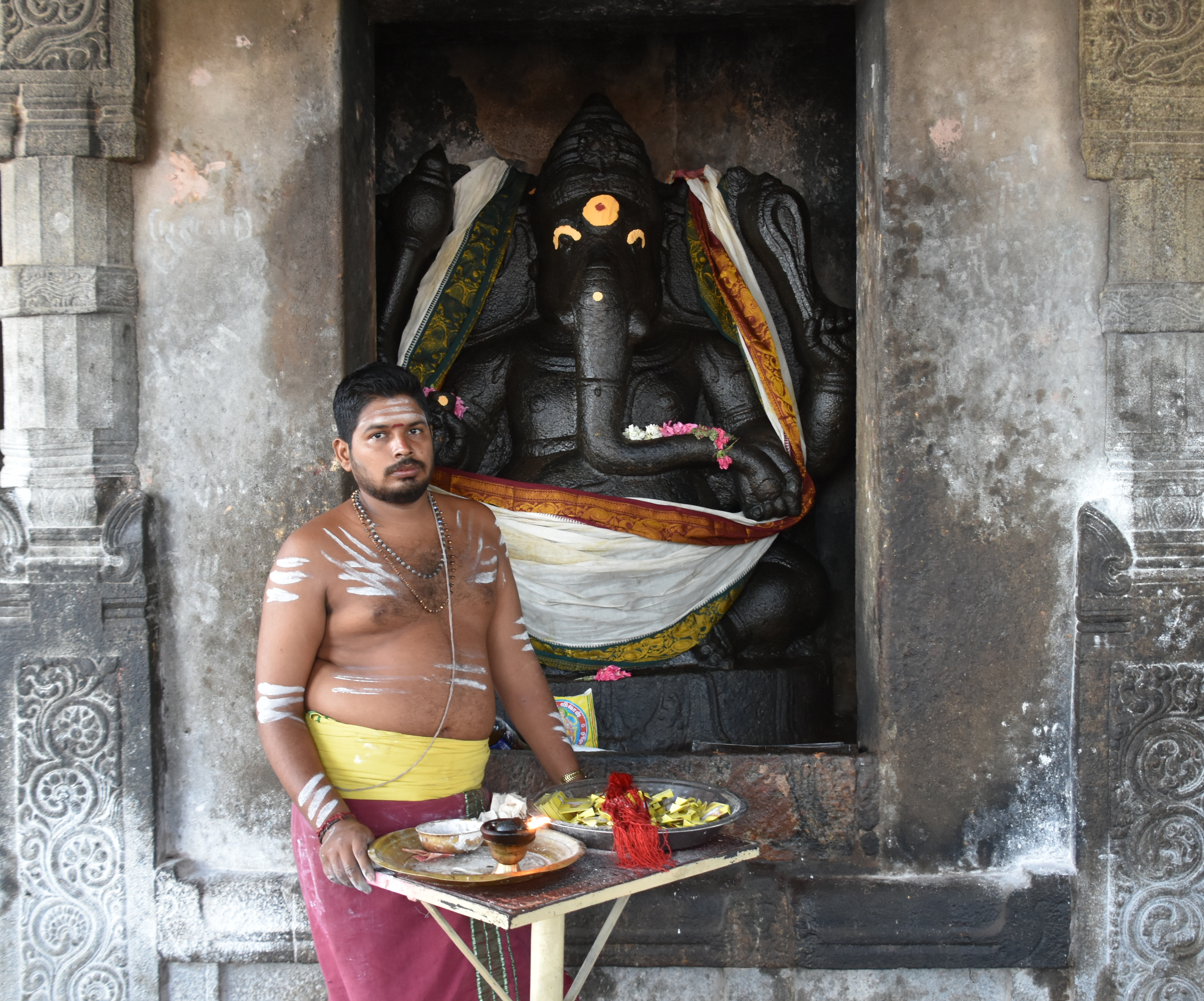
A pujari outside a Ganesha shrine

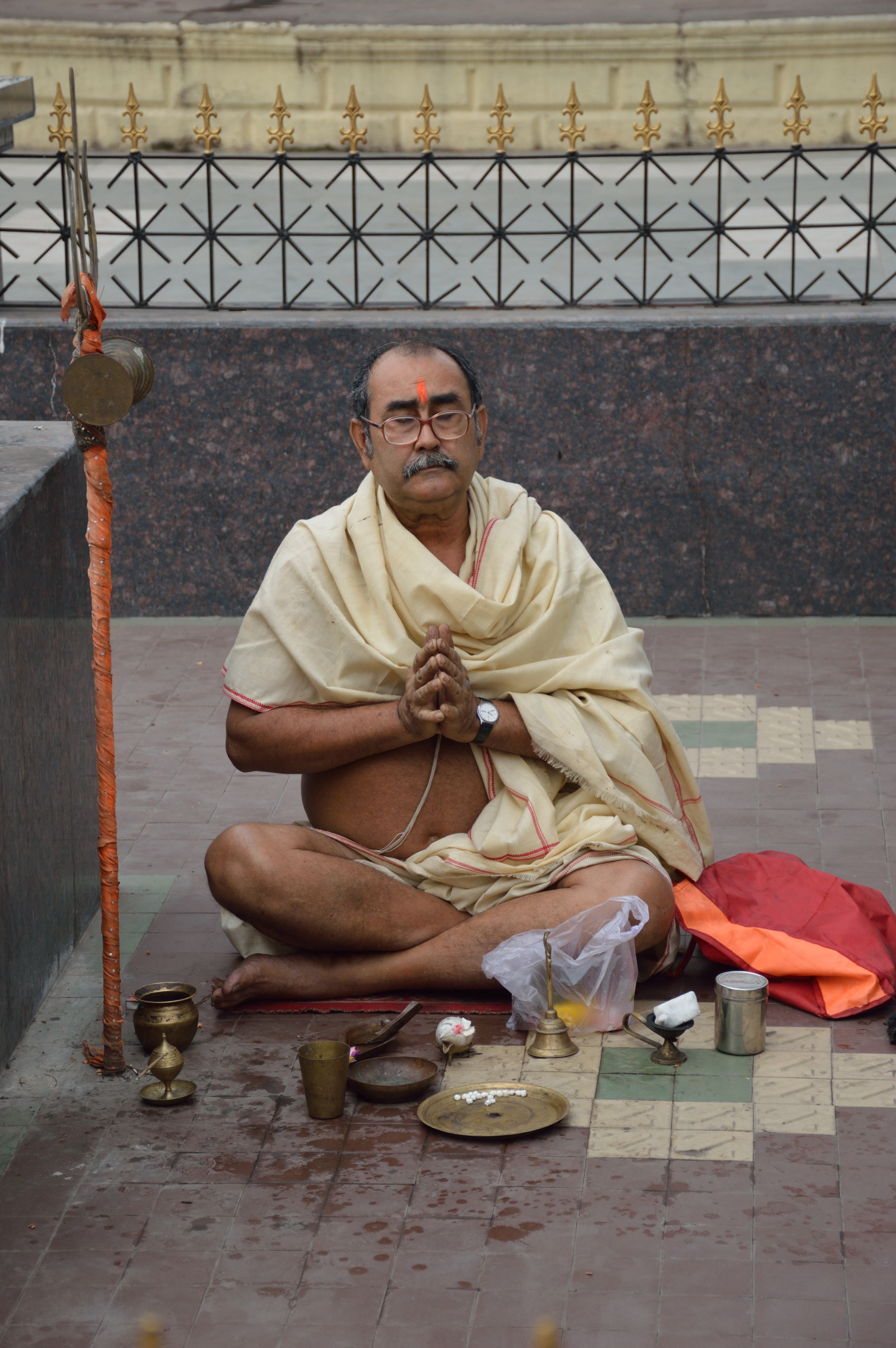
A pujari meditates in Kolkata

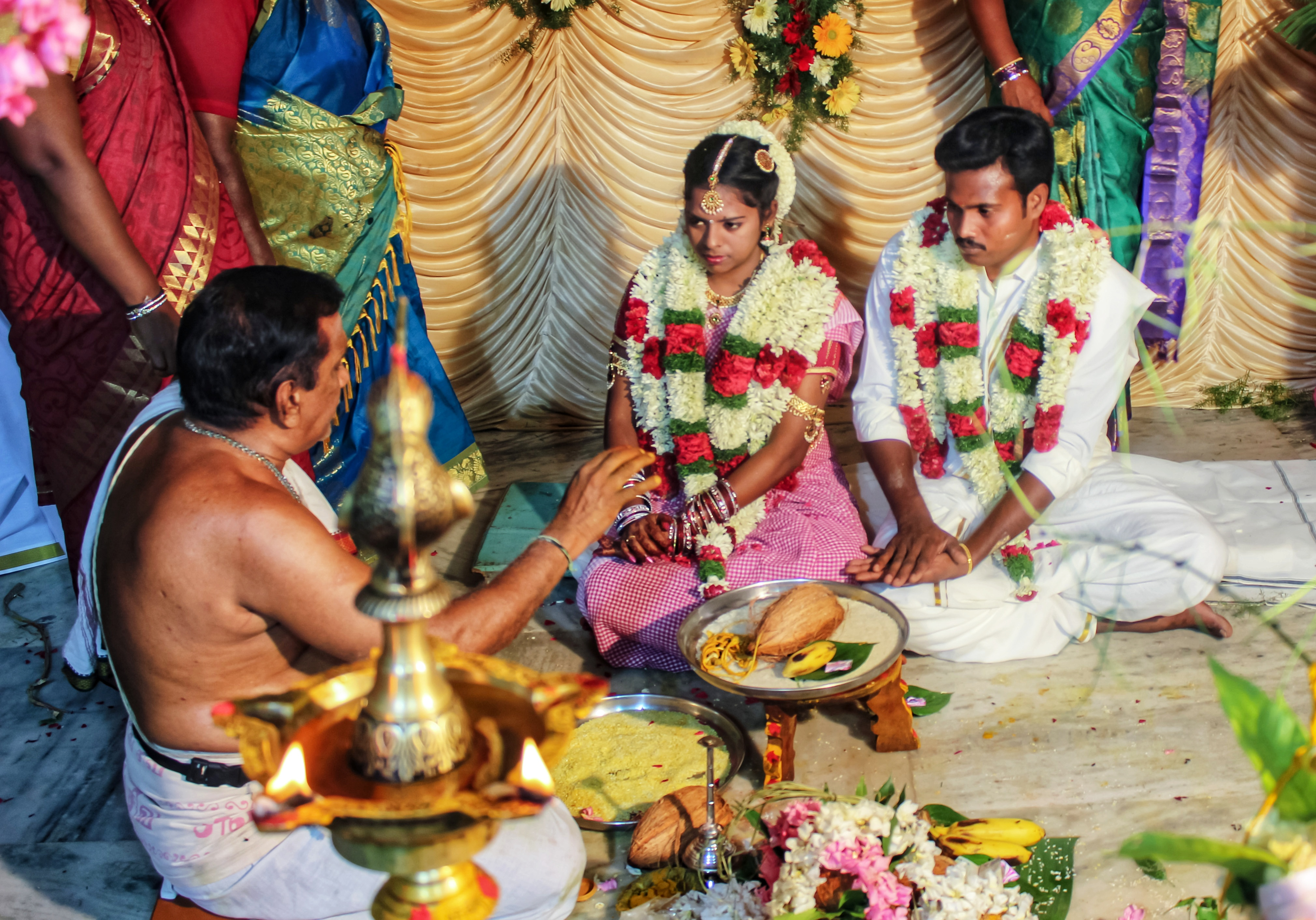
A purohita officiates at a South Indian wedding

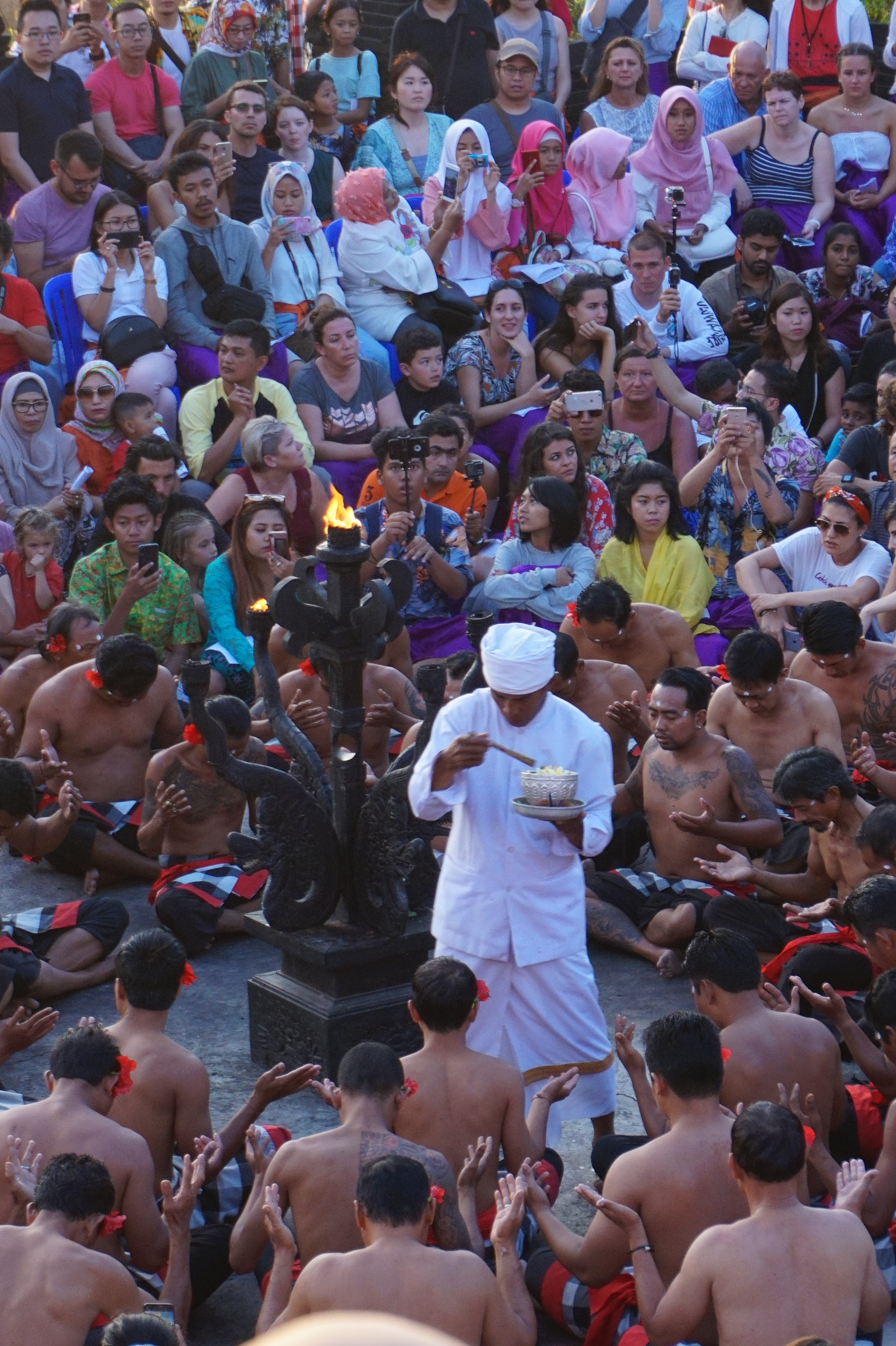
An Indonesian purohita performs a purification ceremony

== See also ==
- Pandit
- Acharya
- Pujari
