= Balak Ram (idol) =

Child form of Hindu deity Rama

Bālaka Rāma
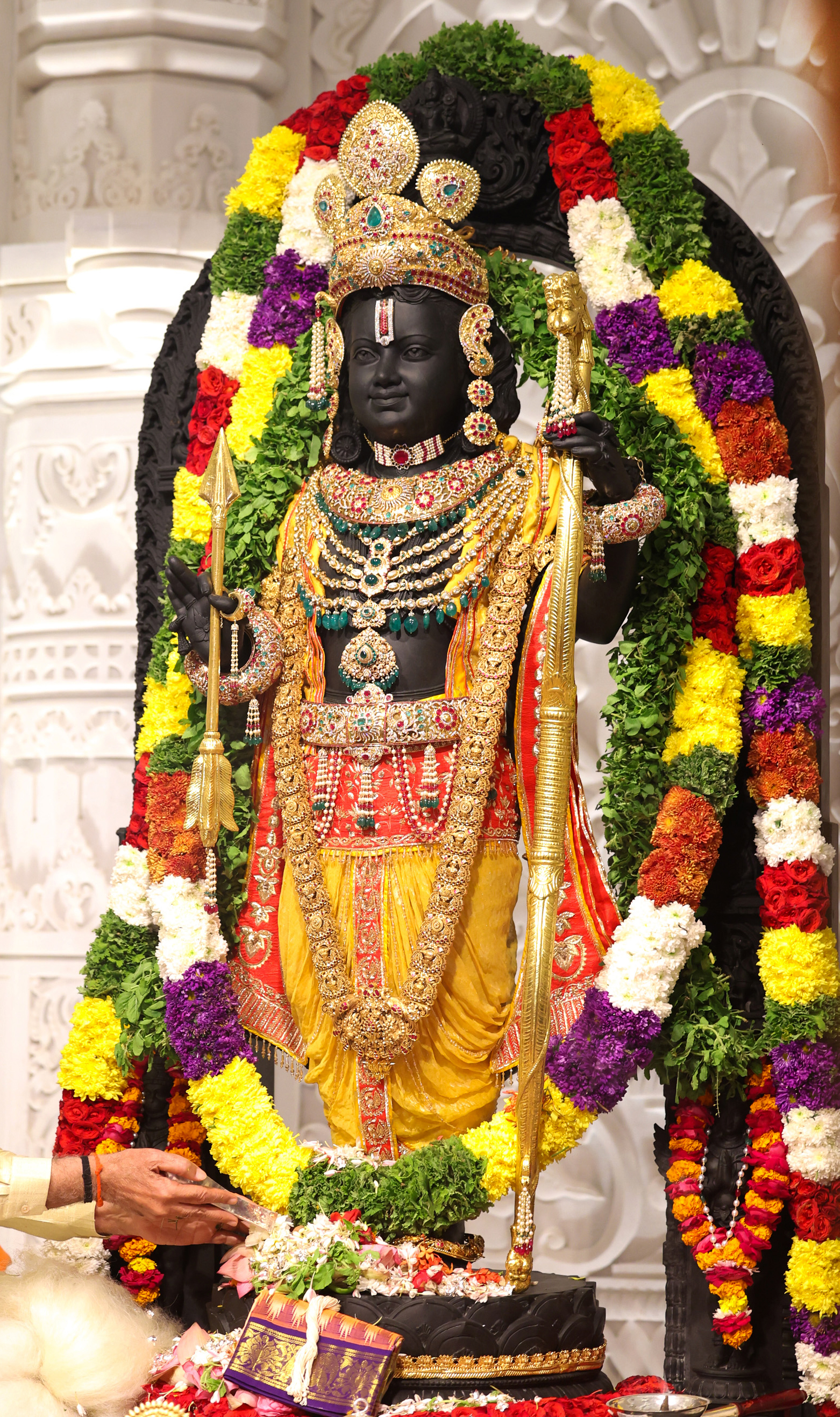
- The central image of the deity at the Ram Mandir located at Ram Janmabhoomi in Ayodhya
- Other names: Rāma Lallā Virājamāna
- Sanskrit transliteration: Bālakarāma
- Affiliation: Form of Vishnu/Rama
- Abode: Ayodhya
- Weapon: Bow and arrow (Note: The name of Rama's bow is Kodanḍa and his arrow is the Rāmabāṇa that is supposed to be infallible upon release.)

Balak Ram (lit. 'Child Rama', IAST: Bālakarāma), also known as Ram Lalla, is the presiding deity of the Ram Mandir, a prominent Hindu temple located at Ram Janmabhoomi, in Hindu mythology the birthplace of the Hindu deity Rama in Ayodhya, India. Balak Rama is housed in the sacred sanctum sanctorum (garbha gṛha) of the Ram Mandir, a traditional Nagara style temple. The murti (idol) was consecrated in an elaborate Prana pratishtha ceremony on January 22, 2024.

In December 1949, idols of Ram Lalla were placed inside the structure, leading to claims by Hindu groups that the idols had miraculously appeared there.

Balak Ram deity represents a five-year-old form of Lord Ram and was prepared by sculptor Arun Yogiraj adhering to the Shilpa Shashtra, a sacred scripture of the sculpting world. On April 17, 2024, the first Ram Navami (Ram's birth festival) after the consecration of Ayodhya's Ram Temple with Balak Ram murti was celebrated by thousands of devotees across India. On this occasion, the forehead of the Ram Lalla idol was anointed with a ray of sunlight, known as Sūrya Tilaka.

== Historical background ==
According to the Ramayana, Rama was born in Ayodhya. The Masjid-i-Janmasthan (mosque of birthplace) was built by Babur at the site, allegedly destroying a Hindu temple commemorating Ram's birthplace. Historical accounts by some European travellers who visited Ayodhya during the early modern period report that the Hindus believed the mosque and its immediate surroundings to be the exact birthplace of Rama.

In 1949, the idols of "Ram Lalla" were placed in the disputed mosque, with some locals claiming that they had miraculously appeared there. Subsequently, in 1950, the state administration took control of the structure and allowed Hindus to perform worship at the site. Further, in the 1980s, Hindu nationalist groups and political parties launched a campaign to construct the Ram Janmabhoomi Mandir ("Rama birthplace temple") at the site. In December 1992, a Hindu nationalist mob destroyed the mosque.

As the dispute continued in courts, a survey was conducted by ASI in 2003 on the 2.77-acre disputed land as ordered by the Allahabad High Court. According to BR Mani, who led this survey, there was evidence that a temple of Nagara Style of North India existed at the place before the construction of the mosque. In 2019, the contentious Ayodhya dispute was settled by the Supreme Court of India, which gave the disputed site to Hindus for a temple, and allotted a separate land to the Muslims for a mosque. After the Ayodhya verdict, the construction of the Ram Mandir temple and the choice of the deity of Rama was supervised by Shri Ram Janmbhoomi Teerth Kshetra, a trust that was set up by the Indian government in 2020.

== Naming ==
The deity was originally referred to as Rām Lallā Virājamān until the construction of the Ram Mandir. In the Kavitāvali, Tulsidas uses the word Rām Lallā. Lāla or Lallā is an affectionate term for children in Braj Bhasha, the language of Tulsidas. The trust says the deity of the newly constructed Ram Mandir shall be called Bālak Rām as the name was used by Tulsidas in the Rāmacaritamānasa.

== Attributes of the murti (idol) ==
The Balak Ram murti (lit. 'idol') represents Rama in the form of a small child. Three Indian sculptors—Ganesh Bhatt, Satyanarayan Pandey, and Arun Yogiraj, were assigned the task of making the idol of the deity by the trust. As per the trust, the characteristics of the deity should depict a five-year-old Bālaka (lit. 'child') with Mandasmita Vadana (lit. 'cheerful-faced') possessing both Divya (lit. 'divine') and Rājakumāra (lit. 'princely') looks. The murti sculpted by Yogiraj was chosen as the presiding deity. The other two are to be placed within the temple as minor deities.

Initially, the sacred Devashila stone of Kali Gandaki river in Nepal was chosen for carving the idol of Ram Lalla but it was ultimately not used due to religious considerations. Subsequently, Yogiraj selected a three-billion-year-old sacred stone known as Krishna Shila (a type of black schist) sourced from Gujjegowdanapura village in Mysore, Karnataka, meticulously sculpting the Murti in profound adherence to the sacred tenets of the Shilpa Shastras. The trust noted that the black stone is water-resistant and non-reactive to the acidic nature of milk when Abhiṣeka (i.e. ritualistic holy bath) is performed.

In accordance with traditional iconography, the deity is manifested in the Sthānaka Bhangima (standing posture) atop a Viśvapadmāsana, a magnificent double-row lotus pedestal. (Note: The deity of Vishnu in Hindu iconography can be of three different postures, namely, Sthānaka (i.e. standing), Āsana (i.e. seated) and Śayana (i.e. reclining/sleeping).) On both sides of the main idol, Hindu deities and symbols are carved on the Śilātoraṇa (i.e. stone arch). They are 10 avatars of Vishnu, Hanuman, Garuda, Swastik, Om, Śankha, Sudarśana cakra, Kaumodaki Gada, Padma, Brahma, Shiva and Surya.

Sage Vedavyasa extolls Rama with the epithet of Mahādhanuḥ (lit. 'the one who wields a great bow') and his bow was said to be dhanuḥ śreṣṭha (lit. 'the best bow') in the Ramopakhyana of Mahabharata. (Note: kṛtacihnaṁ tu sugrīvaṁ rāmo dṛṣṭva mahādhanuḥ vicakarṣa dhanuḥ śreṣṭhaṁ vālimuddiśya lakṣyavat (Mahabharata 3.264.35)) The Balak Ram idol was fitted with a golden bow and arrow. The bow has been crafted carefully by artisans in Chennai.

After consecration, the Hindus refer to the idol in the sanctum sanctorum as mūlavirāṭ mūrti or acala mūrti, while any replica of it used in festivals is called an utsava mūrti (lit. idol for festivals). The trust has clarified that the 9-inch high Ramlalla Virajman idol which was placed in the mosque in 1949 will be henceforth used as the utsava mūrti.

== Consecration ==
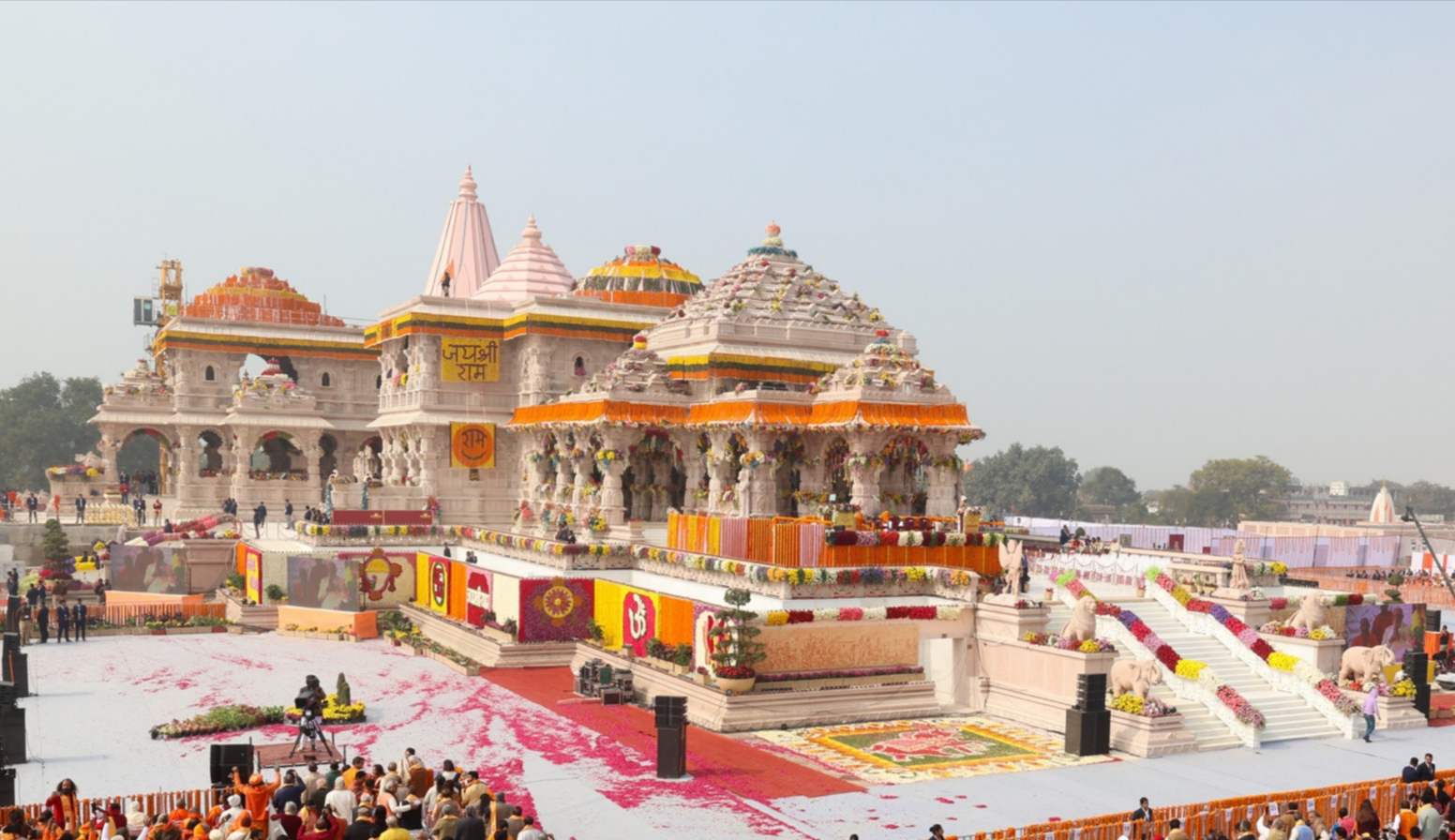
View of the Ram Mandir on Consecration day, Jan 2024

The prana pratishtha (i.e. consecration ceremony) of the deity in the garbhagriha (sanctum sanctorum) of the Ram Mandir occurred on 22 January 2024. The consecration ceremony included recitation of sacred hymns and mantras to invite the deity into the idol, which was henceforth considered as the resident deity Balak Ram. The Trust has announced that every year on the consecration day as Pratiṣṭha dvādaśi shall be celebrated as per the Hindu calendar. According to that calendar, it falls on the twelfth day of the first fortnight of Pushya month; i.e. Pauṣa Śukla Pakṣa Dvādaśi, which is also celebrated by the Hindus as Kūrma Dvādaśi that is the appearance day of Lord Vishnu in the form of a tortoise.

== Adornments ==
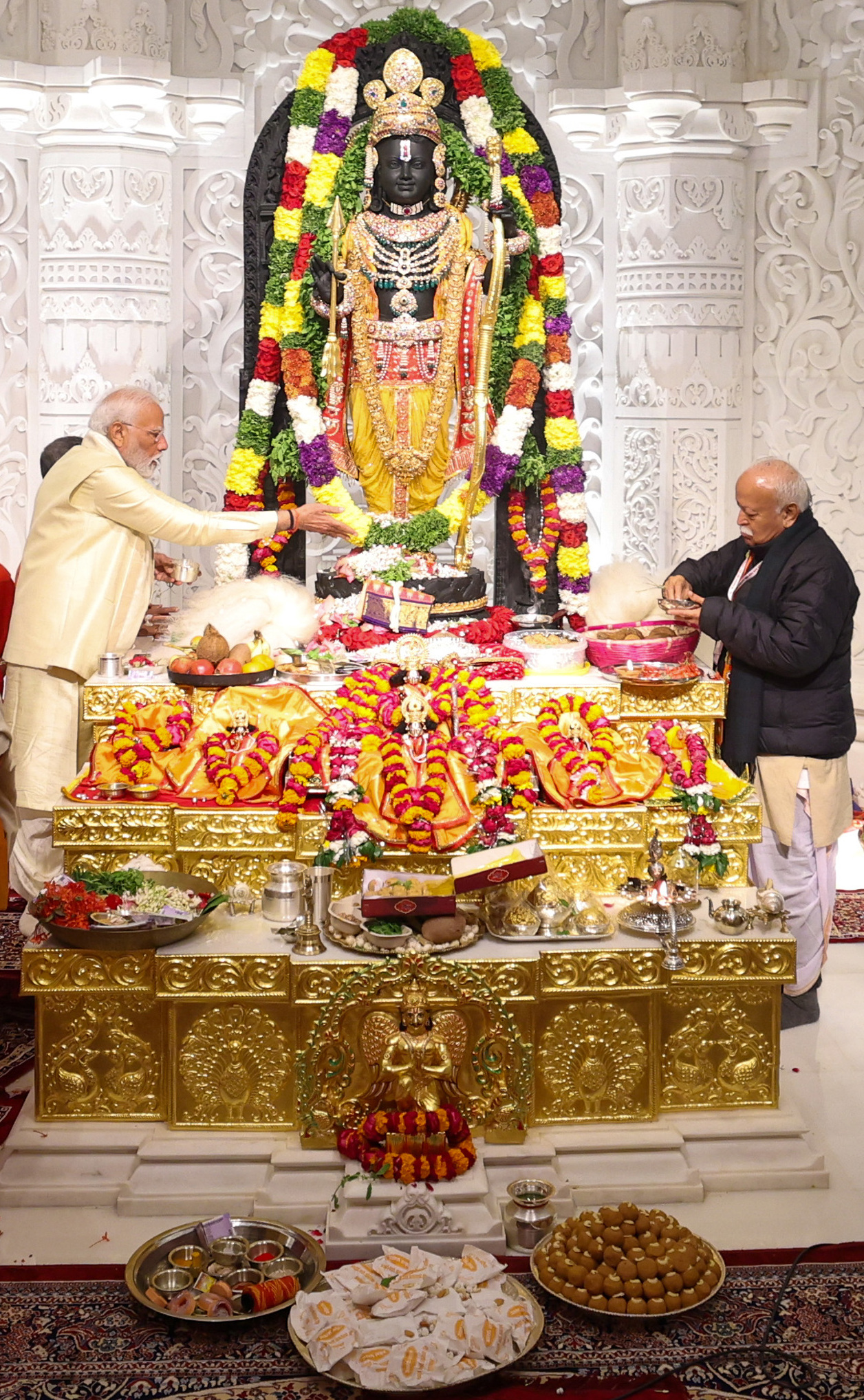
Balak Ram adornments after pran pratishta- Jan 2024

Since antiquity, it has been a custom to offer and adorn Hindu deities with precious metals and valuable stones. The Balak Ram murti was adorned with 15 kilograms (33 lb) of gold and no less than 18,000 precious stones such as diamonds, Zambian emeralds, and rubies. (Note: The trust detailed the ornaments that adorned the deity on the day of consecration, consisting of the Ūrdhva Puṇḍra Tilaka (i.e. a Vaishnava forehead mark), a Makuṭa (i.e. a Hindu royal crown), two Kunḍalas (i.e. earrings), a Kardhani (i.e. a gem-studded girdle), a Kaṇṭhamālā to adorn the neck, a Kaustubha necklace, a Padikā (i.e. a five stranded necklace), a Vijayamālā (i.e. a garland necklace worn by Vishnu), two Bhujabandhas (i.e. two royal armlets), two jewel-studded Kaṅkaṇas (i.e. bangles) for hands, a pair of Painjaniya (i.e. anklets), and Mudrikā (rings). The deity was equipped with Dhanurbāṇa (i.e. a bow and arrow); both made of gold.) Various artisans who crafted the ornaments for the deity have referred to Hindu scriptures about Rama such as Valmiki Ramayana, Adhyatma Ramayana, Alavandar Stotra and Ramacharitamanasa.

== Service to deity ==
Hindu deities are offered services to deity such as Ārati and Prasad. From epigraphic records about Hindu temples we get to know that the services offered to deity are also referred as Aṅga Raṅgabhoga (lit. 'corporeal and theatrical offering'). Per Hindu tradition, Aṅgabhoga consists of services to the body of the deity such as abhiṣeka (lit. 'ritualistic holy bath'), gandha (lit. 'perfume'), vastra (lit. 'dressing'), ābharaṇa (lit. 'adornaments'), puṣpa (lit. 'flowers'). Likewise, Raṅgabhoga include music (either vocal or instrumental) and dance performed in front of the deity. The trust has informed that there will be six Āratis offered to the Balak Ram. They are

- Maṅgala Ārati (Sanskrit: मंगला आरती) is offered to awaken the deity in the morning
- Śṛṅgāra Ārati (Sanskrit: श्रृंगार आरती) is offered after fully decorating the deity
- Rājabhoga Ārati (Sanskrit: राजभोग आरती) is offered as mid-day royal meals and prepared for a siesta
- Utthāpan Ārati (Sanskrit: उत्थापन आरती) is offered to awaken deity from siesta
- Sandhyā Ārati (Sanskrit: संध्या आरती) is offered performed during twilight
- Śayana Ārati (Sanskrit: शयन आरती) is offered to put the deity to sleep

Every day, the deity is venerated with an aṣtayāma seva (A service for every yāmaḥ; three hours). (Note: Yām is a unit of time used in India until the modern era. It is equal to 3 hours.) To offer Raṅgabhoga services, the temple has five halls, namely Raṅgamaṇḍapa, Sabhāmaṇḍapa (transl. Court hall), Nṛtyamaṇḍapa (transl. Hall of dance), Prārthanāmaṇḍapa (transl. Hall of prayer), and Kīrtanāmaṇḍapa (transl. Kirtan hall).

- Surya Tilak (Sanskrit : सूर्य: तिलक) is an annual service to the deity on the occasion of Ram Navami ( Rama's Birthday) in which a beam of sunlight is directed onto the forehead of the idol of Lord Ramlalla at the new Ram Mandir temple. This is achieved using an apparatus with mirrors and lenses specially designed by IIA, Bengaluru.

== Dressing ==
In Hindu temples, dressing the holy deity is considered as a form of devotional service known as Vastrālaṅkaraṇa Seva (lit. 'Dress decoration service'). The deity is dressed on Sunday with pink coloured clothes, on Monday with white, on Tuesday with red, on Wednesday with green, on Thursday with yellow, on Friday with cream, and on Saturday with blue. On the day of consecration, the deity was dressed in a yellow dhoti and a red angavastra. The deity will be dressed in yellow on special occasions.

== Shri Rama Yantra ==
President Droupadi Murmu performing darshan and aarti during the Shri Ram Yantra Sthapana ceremony at Ram Mandir, Ayodhya.

The Śrīrāma Yantra (Sanskrit: श्रीराम यन्त्र), a 3 × 3 ft, 150 kg gold-plated copper yantra, began its journey to Ayodhya on a Rath Yatra from Tirupati on 27 October, inaugurated by Jagadguru Shankaracharya Sri Vijayendra Saraswati of the Kanchi Kamakoti Peetham. (Note: A yantra is a sacred geometric diagram used in Hinduism and related spiritual traditions as a tool for meditation, worship, and focusing the mind on a particular deity, energy, or spiritual principle.) The yantra was subsequently gifted to the temple by the seer. The yantra was installed on the second floor of the Ram Temple in Ayodhya on 19 March 2026 in the presence of the President of India, Droupadi Murmu.

== Temple architecture ==
Ram Mandir was built in the Maru-Gurjara school (also known as Solanki), which is a sub-style of Nagara architecture of Indian temples that exist in Northern, Eastern, and Western India. It was consecrated with the hoisting of the Dharma Dhwaja when the Shikhara of the temple was completed on 25 November, 2025 in the Dhwajarohan. The Ranganathaswamy Temple, Srirangam, Angkor Wat in Cambodia and BAPS Swaminarayan Akshardham in New Jersey are the largest Hindu temples in the world. As per the modified design, it shall have three floors with five domes, and the whole complex spans around 120 acres (49 ha). The Śikhara (trans. main dome) shall be 161 feet (49 m) high. The architect of the Ram Mandir is Chandrakant Sompura, whose father was Prabhakar Sompura, the Somnath temple's architect.

Following the traditional Nagara style temple architecture, the Balak Rama murti (idol) is housed in centrally located sacred sanctum sanctorum (garbha griha) of the Ram Mandir temple in Ayodhya.

== Pratishtha dvadashi ==
Pratiṣṭha Dvādaśi refers to the anniversary of the consecration of the Ram Lalla idol at the Shri Ram Janmabhoomi Temple in Ayodhya. It is observed annually on the Dvādaśī (twelfth day) of the Śukla Pakṣa (waxing moon) in the Hindu month of Puṣya. It marks the historic date of January 22, 2024, when the primary consecration took place. As per the Hindu calendar, the prana pratishtha happened in the year Krodhi. The first prana pratishtha dwadashi was celebrated on January 11 2025.

== See also ==
- Venkateswara
- Vitthala
