= Gaurabda =

Moon calendar used by Gaudiya Vaishnavism

Gaurabda is the name of the moon calendar used by Gaudiya Vaishnavism as part of the liturgy.

It is used as the main calendar of the International Society for Krishna Consciousness.

Following Gaudiya Vaisnava tradition, the years are counted from the birth (traditionally known as the "appearance" day) of Śrī Caitanya Mahaprabhu. Lord Caitanya, widely recognized as the incarnation of Krishna, is also known as Gaura, so the year is called "Gaurabda," or "the year of Lord Caitanya."

== Reasons to follow a lunar calendar ==
Most scholars who have analyzed the two traditional Indian calendar systems, both lunar and solar, have concluded that the lunar system is the more ancient. The lunar phases are known to influence agriculture, and according to scriptures like Manu-samhita (The laws of Manu), they also influence more subtle aspects of human life. In the Vaisnava calendar the times for various celebrations are determined by the lunar tithi, sometimes with naksatra and other elements of the calendar taken into account.

== Traditional and modern methods of calculation ==
Traditionally the astronomical calculations needed to make a Pancanga were done according to an astronomical text such as Surya Siddhanta. The methods described in Surya Siddhanta are similar to modern astronomical methods for ascertaining the positions of the planets.

The main difference is that Surya Siddhanta has a simpler model. Such a model enables practical manual calculation. Observatory instruments could be built without high technology and were used regularly to check that manual calculations tallied with observable reality. When a difference appeared after some time, corrections were made to the astronomical constants in the formulas. With this system, fairly good results were obtainable even though the astronomical model was simple. Its accuracy cannot be compared to that obtained by modern methods, but for the creation of calendars and for the scientific purpose of astrology it sufficed.

Currently a computer program is used to provide formulas that give an accuracy of 1 minute of arc for the longitude of the sun and 2 minutes of arc for the longitude of the moon. When determining ending times of tithis, these errors can result in a maximum error of 5 minutes of time. The average error is about 3 minutes. Such an error will report an Ekadasi (the eleventh tithi) on the wrong date roughly once every 20 years.

=== Names of months ===
Each month, or "masa," is known by a name of Visnu.

The months, the Sanskrit names by which they are commonly known in India, and their rough equivalents according to the Gregorian calendar are listed as follows:

| Presiding Deity | Month name | Period |
|---|---|---|
| 1. Vishnu | Caitra | March–April |
| 2. Madhusudana | Vaisakha | April–May |
| 3. Trivikrama | Jyestha | May–June |
| 4. Vamana | Asadha | June–July |
| 5. Sridhara | Sravana | July–August |
| 6. Hrsikesa | Bhadrapada | August–September |
| 7. Padmanabha | Asvina | September–October |
| 8. Damodara | Kartika | October–November |
| 9. Kesava | Margasirsa | November–December |
| 10. Narayana | Pausa | December–January |
| 11. Madhava | Magha | January–February |
| 12. Govinda | Phalguna | February–March |
| Purusottama | Adhika | Intercalary Month |

== Ekadasi ==
When to observe Ekadasi

Ekadasi, the eleventh tithi, has special importance. In the scripture Caitanya-caritamrta, Lord Caitanya Mahaprabhu instructs Sanatana Goswami regarding the Vaisnava regulative principles (Caitanya-caritamrta, Madhya-lila 24.342):

"You should recommend the avoidance of mixed [viddha] Ekadasi and the performance of pure Ekadasi. You should also describe the fault in not observing this. One should be very careful as far as these items are concerned. If one is not careful, one will be negligent in executing devotional service."

As described in Hari Bhakti Vilasa, viddha (mixed) Ekadasi takes place when the eleventh tithi starts before sunrise but the tenth tithi still presides at the beginning of brahma muhurta (the auspicious period that starts an hour and a half before sunrise).

On Ekadasi it is traditional to fast. But under certain conditions, called mahadvadasi, one fasts not on the Ekadasi but on the next day, the dvadasi, even though the Ekadasi is suddha, or pure, and not viddha, or mixed. There are eight mahadvadasis.

The calendars produced by this program make it easy to see when to observe Ekadasi. The Ekadasi fast should be observed on the day called suddha (pure) Ekadasi, or alternatively on Mahadvadasi, even if the previous day is called Ekadasi. All this is clarified by the asterisk (*), which indicates a fast, at the right margin of the printed computer generated calendar.

"Break fast 05:18 - 09:34" and "Daylight-savings not considered"

To complete the proper observance of Ekadasi, the next morning one should end the fast after the first time given in the calendar and before the second time. The calendar gives these times according to the standard time of the place for which the calendar is made.

During the summer, many locations do not follow standard time, but instead move their clocks an hour ahead (or sometimes more) to make more use of the hours of daylight.

== Links and terminology ==
- Kali yuga
- Yugas
- Panchangam (Almanac)
- "Vaishnava Calendar-glossary and terminology". www.salagram.net.

== Calculations ==
| Calendar Year | Gaurabda |
| 1999 - 2000 AD | 513 |
| 2000 - 2001 AD | 514 |
| 2001 - 2002 AD | 515 |
| 2002 - 2003 AD | 516 |
| 2003 - 2004 AD | 517 |
| 2004 - 2005 AD | 518 |
| 2005 - 2006 AD | 519 |
| 2006 - 2007 AD | 520 |
| 2007 - 2008 AD | 521 |
| 2008 - 2009 AD | 522 |
| 2009 - 2010 AD | 523 |
| 2010 - 2011 AD | 524 |
| 2011 - 2012 AD | 525 |
| 2012 - 2013 AD | 526 |
| 2013 - 2014 AD | 527 |
| 2014 - 2015 AD | 528 |
| 2015 - 2016 AD | 529 |
| 2016 - 2017 AD | 530 |
| 2017 - 2018 AD | 531 |
| 2018 - 2019 AD | 532 |
| 2019 - 2020 AD | 533 |
