= Panakam =

South Indian beverage

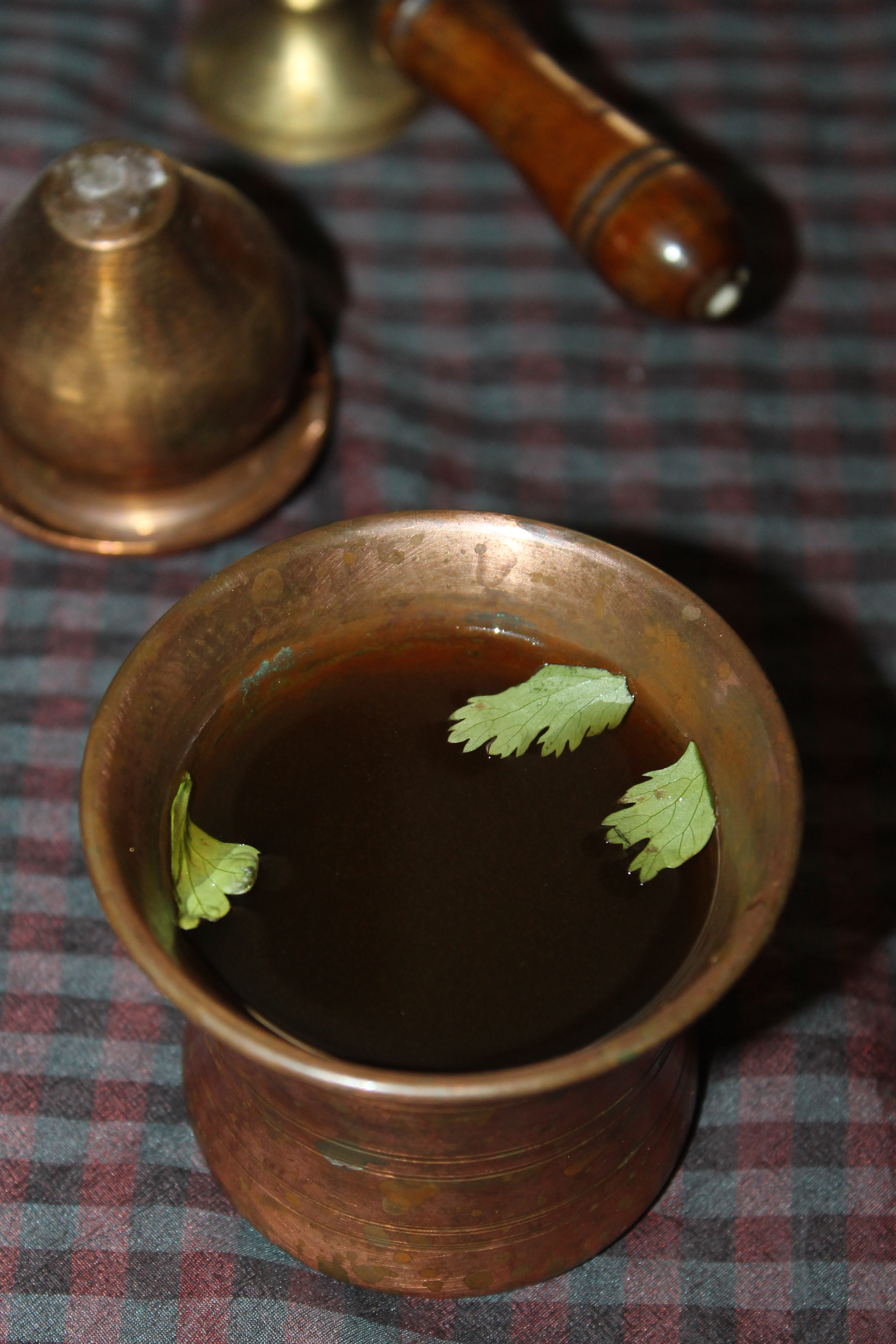
Panakam served in a traditional vessel

Panakam, also spelled Panaka and Panagam, (Pānakaṃ; lit. 'sweet drink') is a traditional beverage originating in South India. According to Madhur Jaffrey it was known circa 1000 BCE; in 2014 she wrote that she had not seen it served but only mentioned in ancient texts.

The drink is traditionally made on Rama Navami, though it is commonly offered as a beverage during Hindu festivals, and as a prasadam after religious ceremonies, especially during the summer months. The Times of India called it "synonymous with Sri Ramnavami". In some parts of India, it is a traditional part of wedding preparations. In fact, Panakam was considered lord Rama's favorite drink.

According to Jaffrey the base of the drink is jaggery. It also typically includes some combination of lemon juice, cardamom, ginger, all of which are usually mixed with cold water. In her 2014 World Vegetarian, Jaffrey calls for it to be served hot. Jaffrey's version to be served cold includes lemon juice, while her hot version does not.
